= Hirohata Station =

Railway station in Himeji, Hyōgo Prefecture, Japan

Hirohata Station 広畑駅
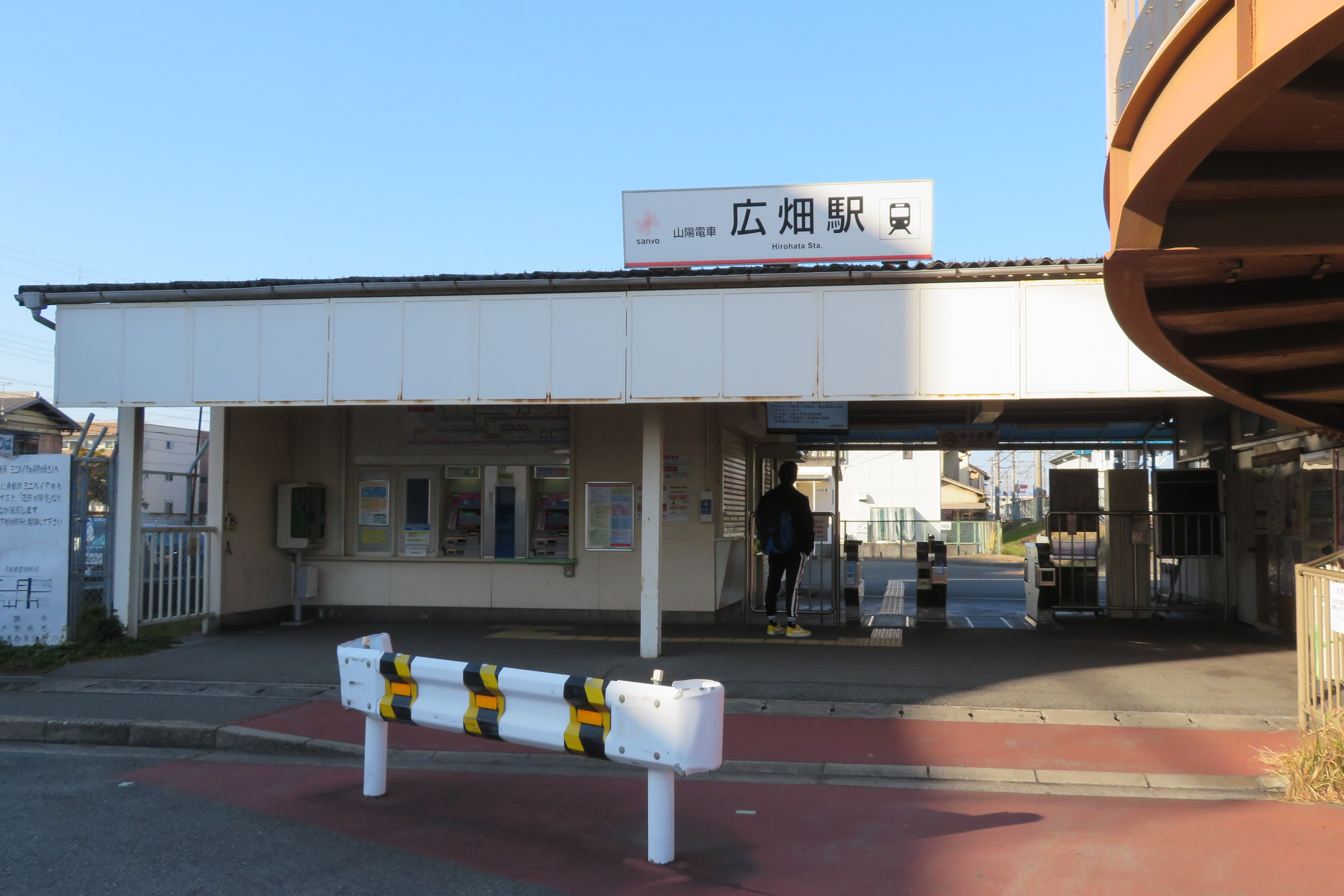
- Station entrance (January 2020)

General information
- Location: 1 Chome Hirohataku Takahamacho, Himeji-shi, Hyōgo-ken 671-1153; Japan
- Coordinates: 34.7975°N 134.6279°E
- Operator: Sanyo Electric Railway
- Line: Aboshi Line
- Distance: 4.7 km from Shikama
- Platforms: 2 side platforms
- Connections

Other information
- Station code: SY53
- Website: Official website

History
- Opened: 23 December 1940
- Former names: Nittetsumae Station (to 1941)

Passengers
- FY2019: 1047 (boarding only)

Services
Preceding station	Sanyo Electric Railway	Following station
Yumesakigawa towards Shikama	Aboshi Line	Sanyo-Temma towards Sanyo-Aboshi
Location
- Location within Hyōgo Prefecture Location within Japan

Hirohata Station (広畑駅, Hirohata-eki) is a passenger railway station in the city of Himeji, Hyōgo Prefecture, Japan, operated by the private Sanyo Electric Railway.

== Lines ==
Hirohata Station is served by the Sanyo Railway Aboshi Line and is 4.7 kilometers from the terminus of the line at Shikama.

== Station layout ==
The station consists of two unnumbered ground-level side platforms connected by a level crossing. The station building and sole entrance is at the south east end of the Sanyo-Aboshi bound platform. The station is unattended.

=== Platforms ===
station side	■ Aboshi Line	for Sanyo-Aboshi
opposite side	■ Aboshi Line	for Shikama

== History ==
Hirohata Station opened on December 23, 1940 as Nittetsumae Station (日鉄前駅). It was renamed March 27,1941.

== Passenger statistics ==
In fiscal 2018, the station was used by an average of 1047 passengers daily (boarding passengers only).

== Surrounding area ==
- Nippon Steel Setouchi Steel Works
- Hirohata Civic Center
- Himeji Nishi Health Center

== See also ==
- List of railway stations in Japan
