= Sanyo-Temma Station =

Railway station in Himeji, Hyōgo Prefecture, Japan

Sanyo-Temma Station 山陽天満駅
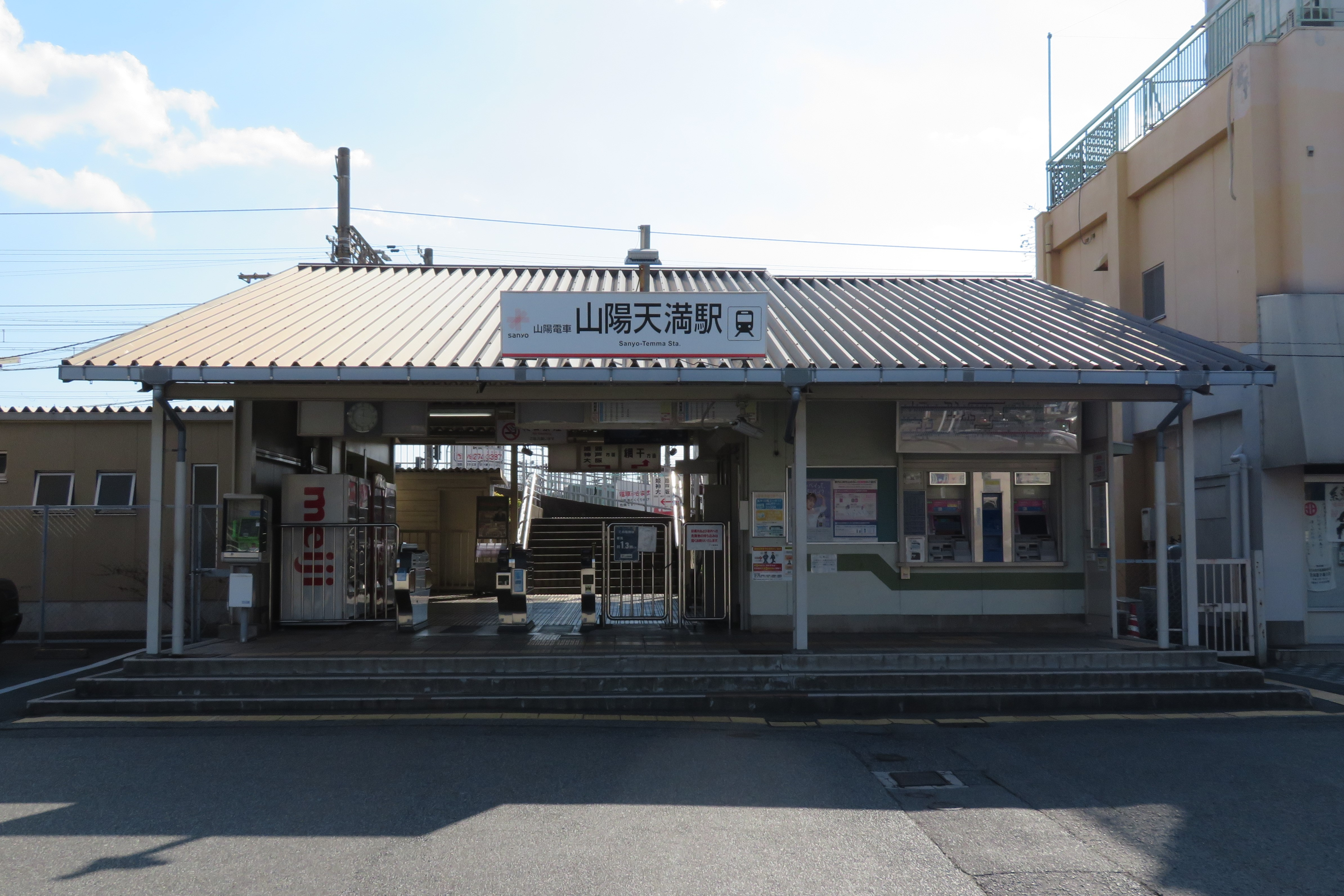
- Station entrance (January 2020)

General information
- Location: 1 Chome Otsuku Tenjinmachi, Himeji-shi, Hyōgo-ken 671-1131; Japan
- Coordinates: 34.7963°N 134.6173°E
- Operator: Sanyo Electric Railway
- Line: Aboshi Line
- Distance: 5.6 km from Shikama
- Platforms: 2 side platforms
- Connections

Other information
- Station code: SY54
- Website: Official website

History
- Opened: 27 April 1941

Passengers
- FY2019: 1190 (boarding only)

Services
Preceding station	Sanyo Electric Railway	Following station
Hirohata towards Shikama	Aboshi Line	Hiramatsu towards Sanyo-Aboshi
Location
- Location within Hyōgo Prefecture Location within Japan

Sanyo-Temma Station (山陽天満駅, Sanyo-Temma-eki) is a passenger railway station located in the city of Himeji, Hyōgo Prefecture, Japan, operated by the private Sanyo Electric Railway.

== Lines ==
Sanyo-Temma Station is served by the Sanyo Railway Aboshi Line and is 5.6 kilometers from the terminus of the line at Shikama.

== Station layout ==
The station consists of two unnumbered ground-level side platforms connected by a level crossing. The station building and sole entrance is located at the north west end of the Shikama bound platform. The station is unattended.

=== Platforms ===
station side	■ Aboshi Line	for Sanyo-Aboshi
opposite side	■ Aboshi Line	for Shikama

== History ==
Sanyo-Temma Station opened on April 27, 1941.

== Passenger statistics ==
In fiscal 2018, the station was used by an average of 1190 passengers daily (boarding passengers only).

== Surrounding area ==
- Shioiri River,
- Japan National Route 250

== See also ==
- List of railway stations in Japan
