= 山陽 =

山陽 or 山阳 may refer to:

- Sanyang (disambiguation)
  - Sanyang, Mungyeong, North Gyeongsang Province, South Korea
- Sanyo (disambiguation)
  - San'yō region, Japan
- Shanyang (disambiguation)
  - Shanyang County, Shaanxi province, China
- Sơn Dương district, Tuyên Quang province, Vietnam

== See also ==
- The dictionary definition of 山 at Wiktionary
- The dictionary definition of 陽 at Wiktionary
- The dictionary definition of 阳 at Wiktionary
