= Yumesakigawa Station =

Railway station in Himeji, Hyōgo Prefecture, Japan

Yumesakigawa Station 夢前川駅
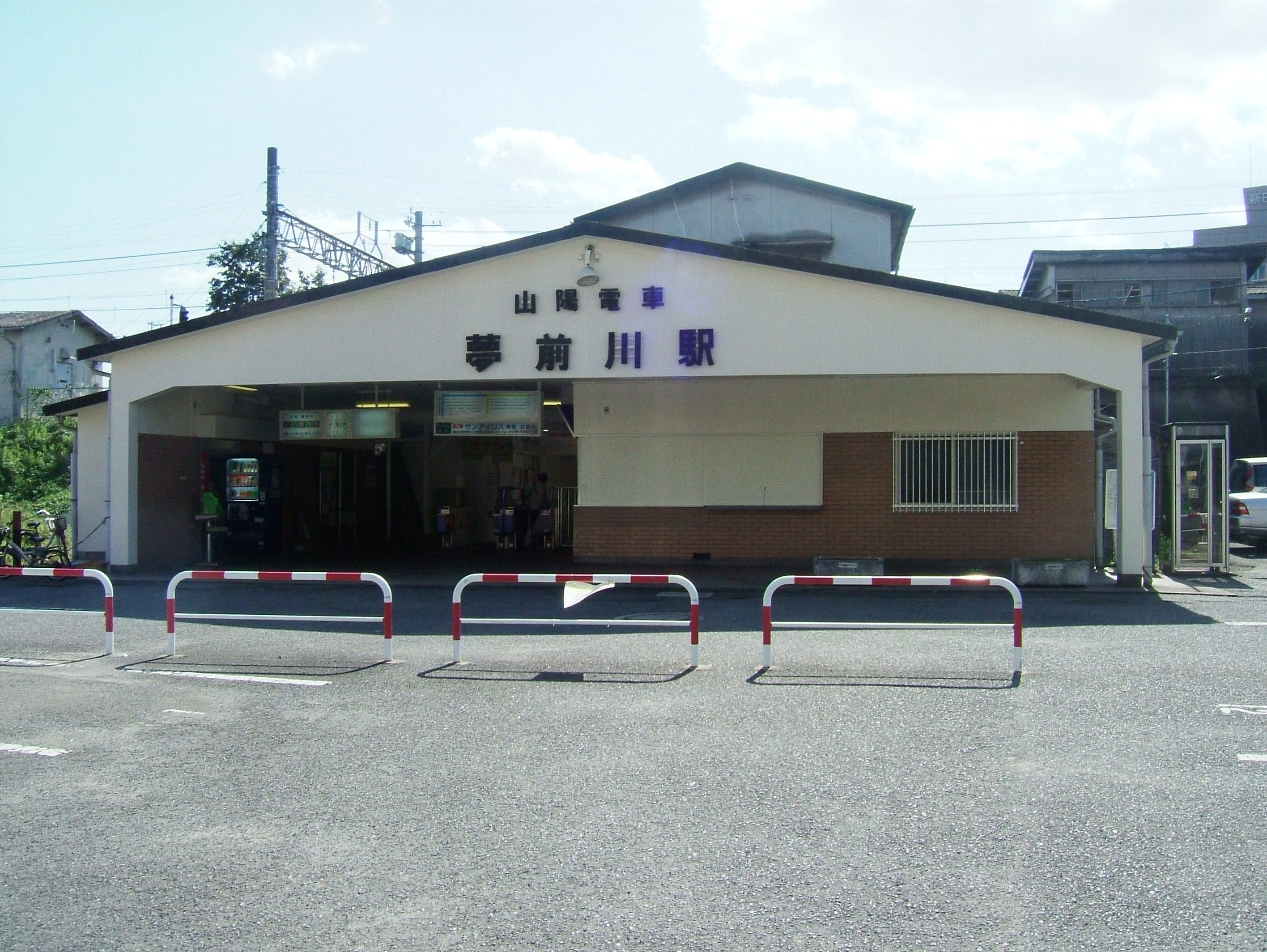
- Station entrance (October 2007))

General information
- Location: 3 Chome Hirohataku Higashishinmachi, Himeji-shi, Hyōgo-ken 671-1121; Japan
- Coordinates: 34.7985°N 134.6392°E
- Operator: Sanyo Electric Railway
- Line: Aboshi Line
- Distance: 3.6 km from Shikama
- Platforms: 2 side platforms
- Connections

Other information
- Station code: SY52
- Website: Official website

History
- Opened: 15 October 1940

Passengers
- FY2019: 1190 (boarding only)

Services
Preceding station	Sanyo Electric Railway	Following station
Nishi-Shikama towards Shikama	Aboshi Line	Hirohata towards Sanyo-Aboshi
Location
- Location within Hyōgo Prefecture Location within Japan

Yumesakigawa Station (夢前川駅, Yumesakigawa-eki) is a passenger railway station located in the city of Himeji, Hyōgo Prefecture, Japan, operated by the private Sanyo Electric Railway.

== Lines ==
Yumesakigawa Station is served by the Sanyo Railway Aboshi Line and is 3.6 kilometers from the terminus of the line at Shikama.

== Station layout ==
The station consists of two unnumbered ground-level side platforms connected by an underground passage. The station building is located at the north east end of the Shikama bound platform. Part of the underpass is divided outside of the fare controlled area to allow access to the station from the south side. The station is unattended.

=== Platforms ===
station side	■ Aboshi Line	for Sanyo-Aboshi
opposite side	■ Aboshi Line	for Shikama

== History ==
Yumesakigawa Station opened on October 15, 1940.

== Passenger statistics ==
In fiscal 2018, the station was used by an average of 1190 passengers daily (boarding passengers only).

== Surrounding area ==
- Yumesaki River
- Nippon Steel Setouchi Steel Works

== See also ==
- List of railway stations in Japan
