= Nishi-Shikama Station =

Railway station in Himeji, Hyōgo Prefecture, Japan

Nishi-Shikama Station 西飾磨駅
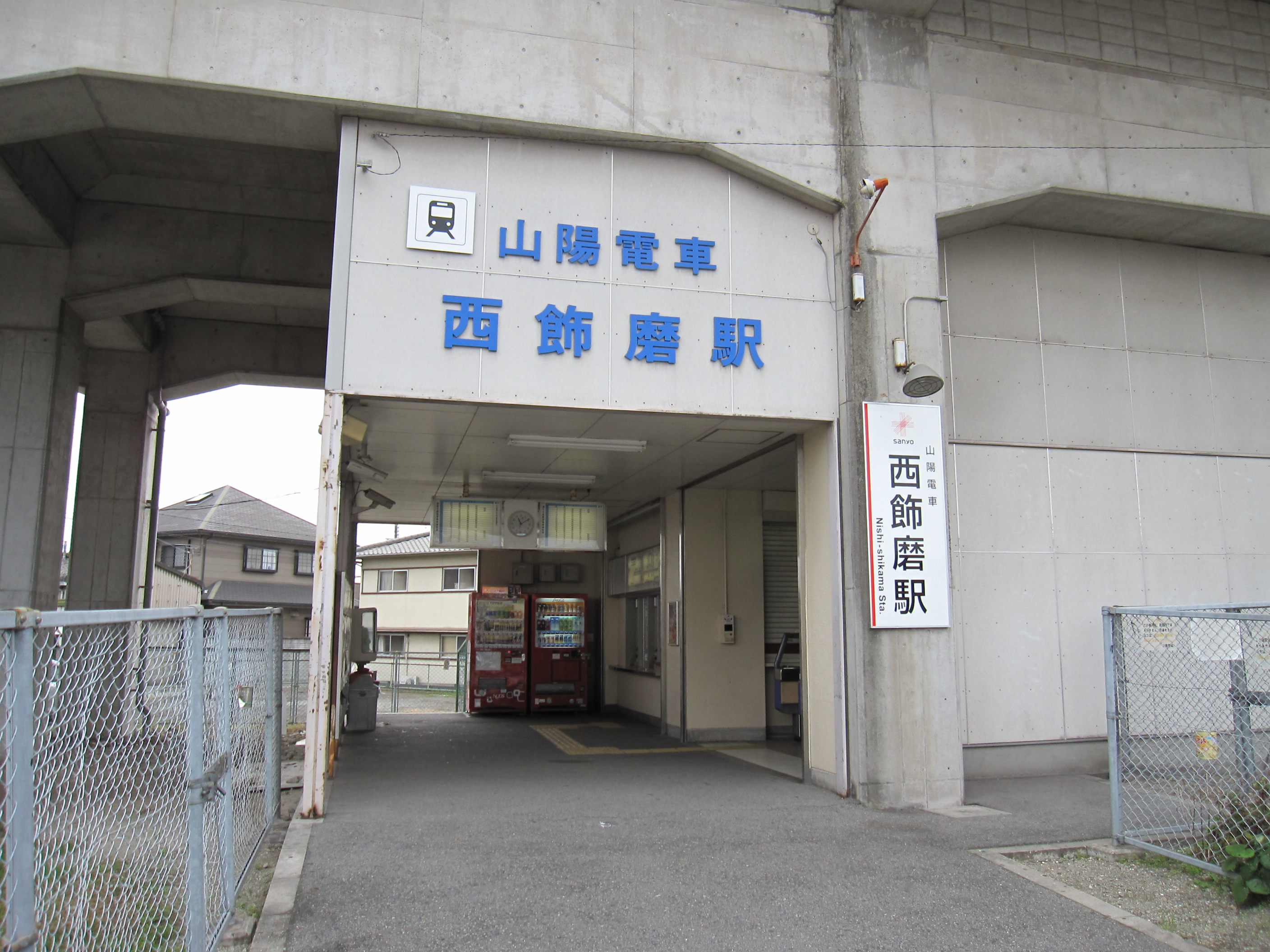
- Station entrance (November 2011)

General information
- Location: 2 Chome Shikamaku Imazaike, Himeji-shi, Hyōgo-ken 672-8079; Japan
- Coordinates: 34.8033°N 134.6514°E
- Operator: Sanyo Electric Railway
- Line: Aboshi Line
- Distance: 2.4 km from Shikama
- Platforms: 2 side platforms
- Connections

Other information
- Station code: SY51
- Website: Official website

History
- Opened: 15 October 1940

Passengers
- FY2019: 1285 (boarding only)

Services
Preceding station	Sanyo Electric Railway	Following station
Shikama Terminus	Aboshi Line	Yumesakigawa towards Sanyo-Aboshi
Location
- Location within Hyōgo Prefecture Location within Japan

Nishi-Shikama Station (西飾磨駅, Nishi-Shikama-eki) is a passenger railway station located in the city of Himeji, Hyōgo Prefecture, Japan, operated by the private Sanyo Electric Railway.

== Lines ==
Nishi-Shikama Station is served by the Sanyo Railway Aboshi Line and is 2.4 kilometers from the terminus of the line at Shikama.

== Station layout ==
The station consists of two unnumbered elevated side platforms with the station building underneath. The station is unattended.

=== Platforms ===
south	■ Aboshi Line	for Sanyo-Aboshi
north	■ Aboshi Line	for Shikama

== History ==
Nishi-Shikama Station opened on 15 October 1940.

== Passenger statistics ==
In fiscal 2018, the station was used by an average of 1285 passengers daily (boarding passengers only).

== Surrounding area ==
- Tsudatenma Shrine
- Eiga Castle Honmaru Monument

== See also ==
- List of railway stations in Japan
