= Hiramatsu Station =

Railway station in Himeji, Hyōgo Prefecture, Japan

Hiramatsu Station 平松駅
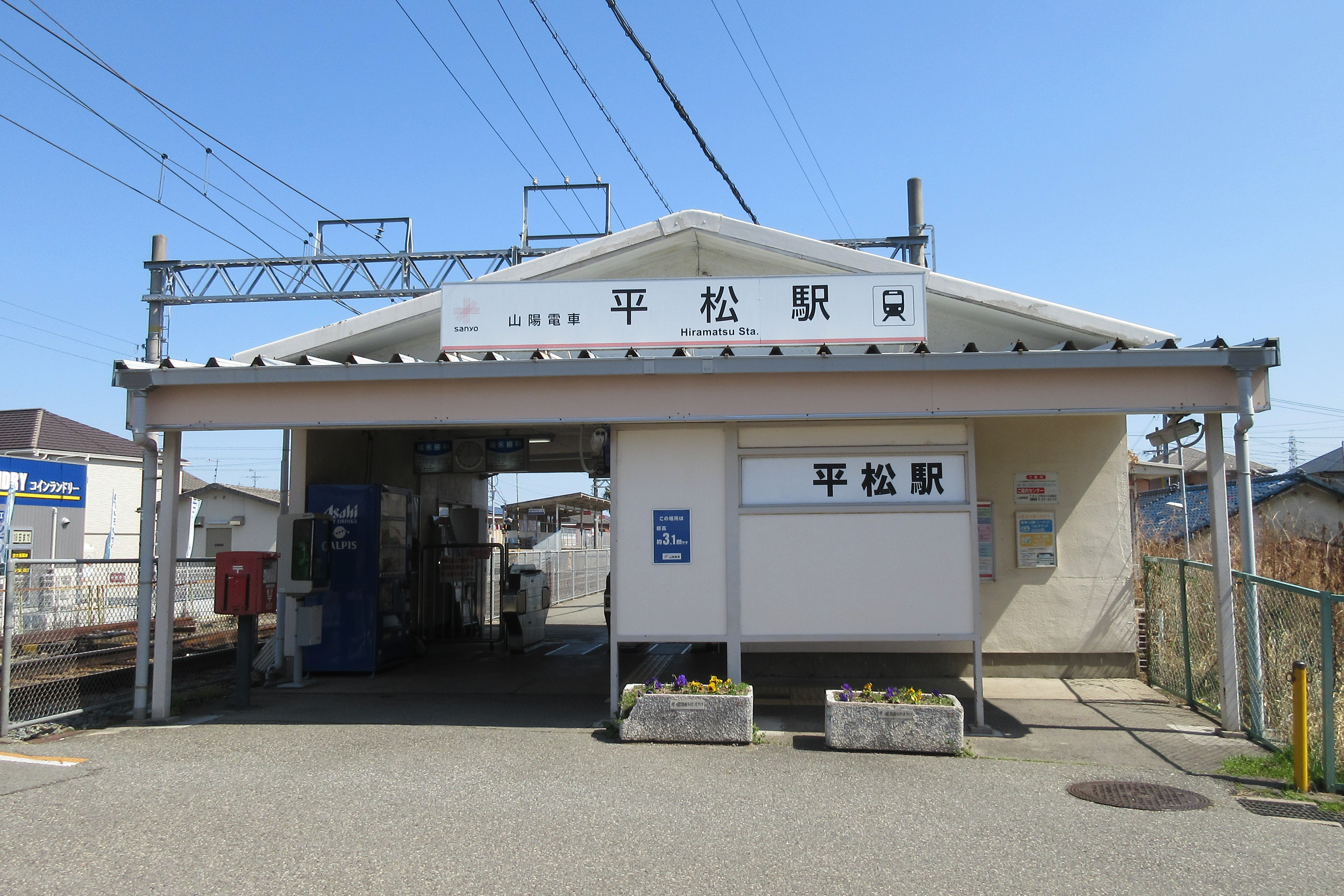
- Station entrance (March 2018)

General information
- Location: Hiramatsu Otsuku, Himeji-shi, Hyōgo-ken 671-1145; Japan
- Coordinates: 34.7907°N 134.6010°E
- Operator: Sanyo Electric Railway
- Line: Aboshi Line
- Distance: 7.3 km from Shikama
- Platforms: 2 side platforms
- Connections

Other information
- Station code: SY55
- Website: Official website

History
- Opened: 10 March 1942

Passengers
- FY2019: 714 (boarding only)

Services
Preceding station	Sanyo Electric Railway	Following station
Sanyo-Temma towards Shikama	Aboshi Line	Sanyo-Aboshi Terminus
Location
- Location within Hyōgo Prefecture Location within Japan

Hiramatsu Station (平松駅, Hiramatsu-eki) is a passenger railway station located in the city of Himeji, Hyōgo Prefecture, Japan, operated by the private Sanyo Electric Railway.

== Lines ==
Hiramatsu Station is served by the Sanyo Railway Aboshi Line and is 7.3 kilometers from the terminus of the line at Shikama.

== Station layout ==
The station consists of two unnumbered ground-level side platforms connected by a level crossing. The station building and sole entrance is located west of the Sanyo-Aboshi bound platform. The station is unattended.

=== Platforms ===
station side	■ Aboshi Line	for Sanyo-Aboshi
opposite side	■ Aboshi Line	for Shikama

== History ==
Hiramatsu Station opened on March 10, 1942. The naming rights of the station were acquired by Yamato Kogyo Group on 1 December 2018, and the station is now subtitled Nearest station for the Yamato Kogyo Group (大和工業グループ最寄駅).

== Passenger statistics ==
In fiscal 2018, the station was used by an average of 714 passengers daily (boarding passengers only).

== Surrounding area ==
- Kibi Post Office
- Otsumo River

== See also ==
- List of railway stations in Japan
