= Tegara Station =

Railway station in Himeji, Hyogo prefecture, Japan

Tegara Station 手柄駅
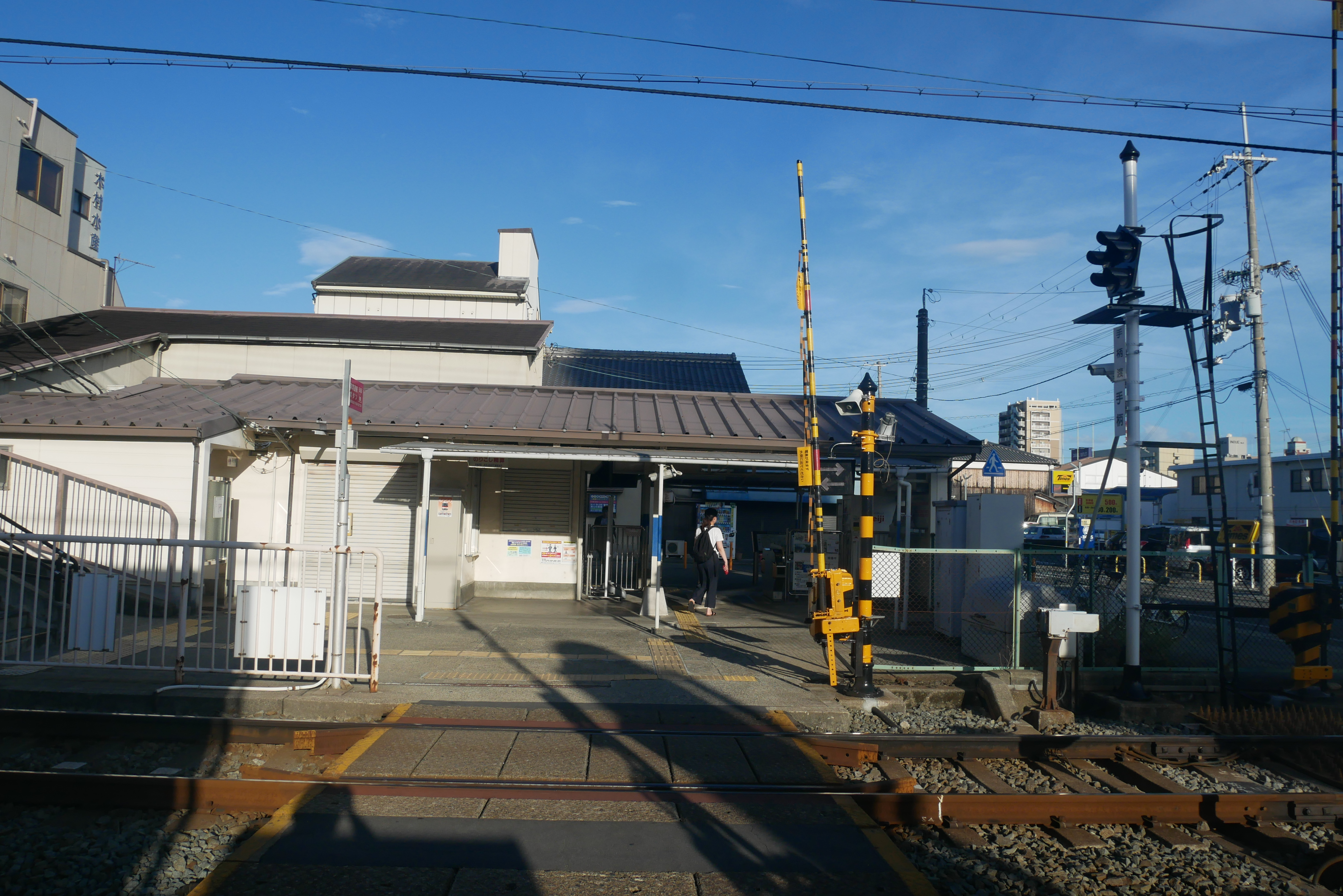
- Station building as seen from the platform side, 2019

General information
- Location: Higashinobusue, Himeji-shi, Hyōgo-ken 670-0965; Japan
- Coordinates: 34.8197°N 134.6812°E
- Operator: Sanyo Electric Railway
- Line: ■ Main Line
- Distance: 53.4 km from Nishidai
- Platforms: 2 side platforms
- Connections

Other information
- Station code: SY42
- Website: Official website

History
- Opened: 19 August 1923

Passengers
- FY2019: 1047 (boarding only)
Location
- Location within Hyōgo Prefecture Location within Japan

Tegara Station (手柄駅, Tegara-eki) is a passenger railway station located in the city of Himeji, Hyōgo Prefecture, Japan, operated by the private Sanyo Electric Railway.

== Lines ==
Tegara Station is served by the Sanyo Electric Railway Main Line and is 53.4 kilometers from the terminus of the line at Nishidai.

== Station layout ==
The station consists of two unnumbered ground-level side platforms connected by a level crossing. The station is unattended.

=== Platforms ===
station side	■ Main Line	for Akashi, Kobe and Osaka
opposite side	■ Main Line	for Sanyo-Himeji

== Adjacent stations ==
«	Service	»
Sanyo Electric Railway
Sanyo Electric Railway Main Line
Kameyama	Local	Sanyo-Himeji
Kameyama	S Limited Express (running only from Hanshin Sannomiya for Himeji)	Sanyo-Himeji
Sanyo & Through Limited Express: Does not stop at this station

== History ==
Tegara Station opened on August 19, 1923. The station was closed July 20, 1945 and reopened on August 1, 1958.

== Passenger statistics ==
In fiscal 2018, the station was used by an average of 1047 passengers daily (boarding passengers only).

== Surrounding area ==
- Senba River
- Tegarayama Central Park
- Himeji City Himeji Stadium
- Himeji City Athletics Stadium
- Himeji City Central Gymnasium
- Hyogo Prefectural Budokan

== See also ==
- List of railway stations in Japan
