= Sanyo 6000 series =

Japanese train type

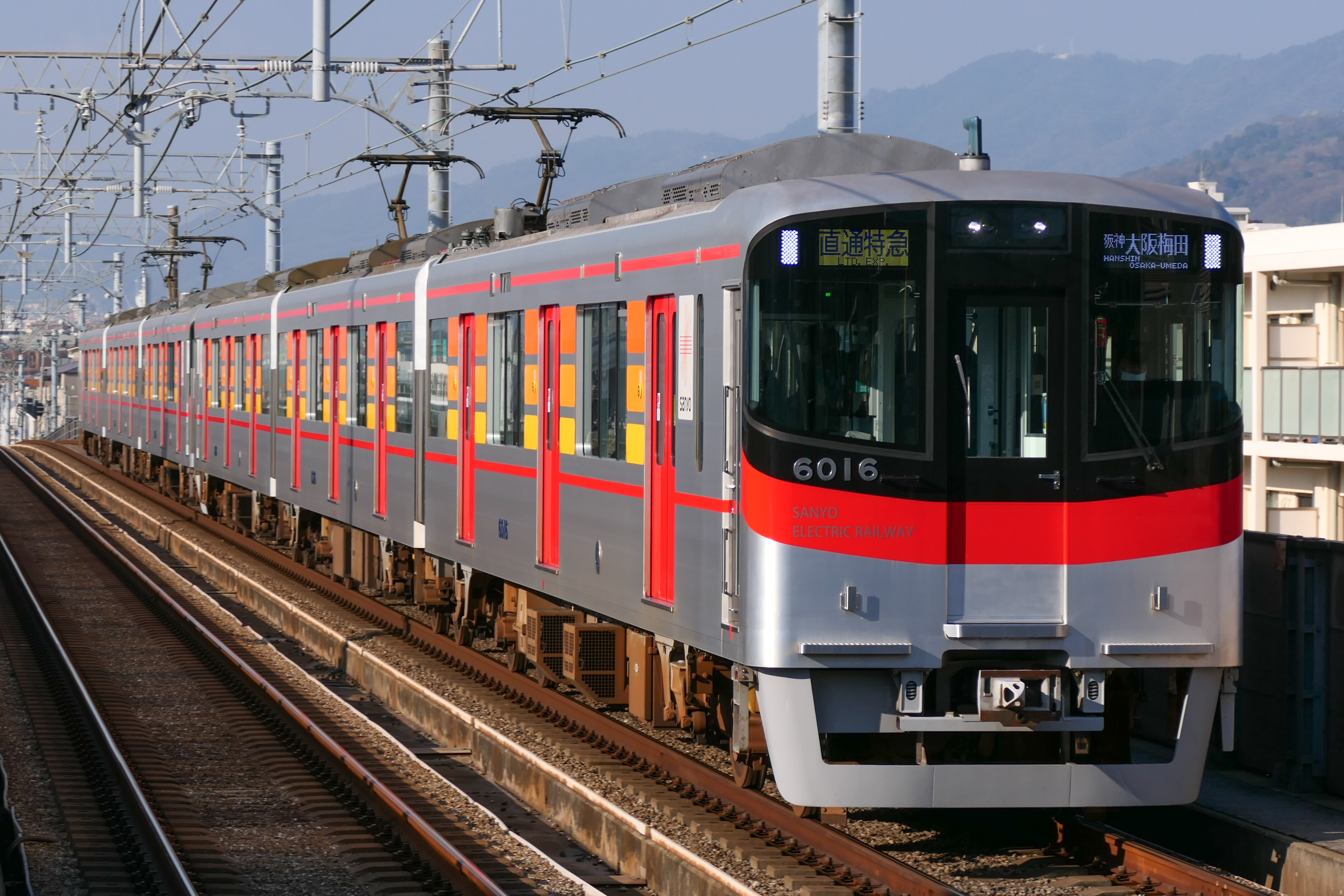
- Set 6016 in service in December 2021
- Manufacturer: Kawasaki Heavy Industries
- Built at: Kobe
- Family name: efACE
- Replaced: 3000 series
- Constructed: 2015–
- Entered service: 27 April 2016
- Number built: 15 vehicles (5 sets)
- Number in service: 15 vehicles (5 sets)
- Formation: 3 cars per trainset
- Fleet numbers: 6000-
- Operator: Sanyo Electric Railway
- Depot: Higashi-Futami
- Lines served: Sanyo Electric Railway Main Line; Sanyo Electric Railway Aboshi Line; Hanshin Kobe Kosoku Line; Hanshin Main Line

Specifications
- Car body construction: Aluminium alloy, double-skin
- Car length: 18,800 mm (61 ft 8 in)
- Width: 2,790 mm (9 ft 2 in)
- Height: 4 m (13 ft 1 in)
- Doors: 3 pairs per side
- Maximum speed: 110 km/h (68 mph) (service); 130 km/h (81 mph) (design)
- Traction system: Variable frequency (IGBT)
- Acceleration: 3.0 km/(h⋅s) (1.9 mph/s)
- Deceleration: 4.2 km/(h⋅s) (2.6 mph/s) (service); 4.5 km/(h⋅s) (2.8 mph/s) (emergency)
- Electric system: 1,500 V DC
- Current collection: Overhead wire
- Bogies: KW204 (motored), KW205 (trailer)
- Track gauge: 1,435 mm (4 ft 8 1/2 in)

The Sanyo Electric Railway 6000 series (山陽電気鉄道6000系, San'yō Denki tetsudō 6000-kei) is an electric multiple unit (EMU) train type operated by the private railway operator Sanyo Electric Railway in Japan since April 2016.

== Design ==
The trains have aluminium alloy bodies.

== Formations ==
As of 1 May 2017, five three-car sets (6000 to 6004) are in service. The trains are formed as shown below, with two driving motor ("Mc") cars and one non-powered intermediate trailer ("T") car. Odd and even-numbered sets differ in that even-numbered sets have a gangway connection at the Sanyo Himeji (western) end, while odd-numbered sets have a gangway connection at the Nishidai (eastern) end.

=== Even-numbered sets ===
Designation	Mc1	T	Mc2
Numbering	600x	630x	610x
Weight (t)	34.0	27.9	34.2
Capacity (total/seated)	122/41	135/49	122/41

The intermediate trailer cars are fitted with two single-arm pantographs.

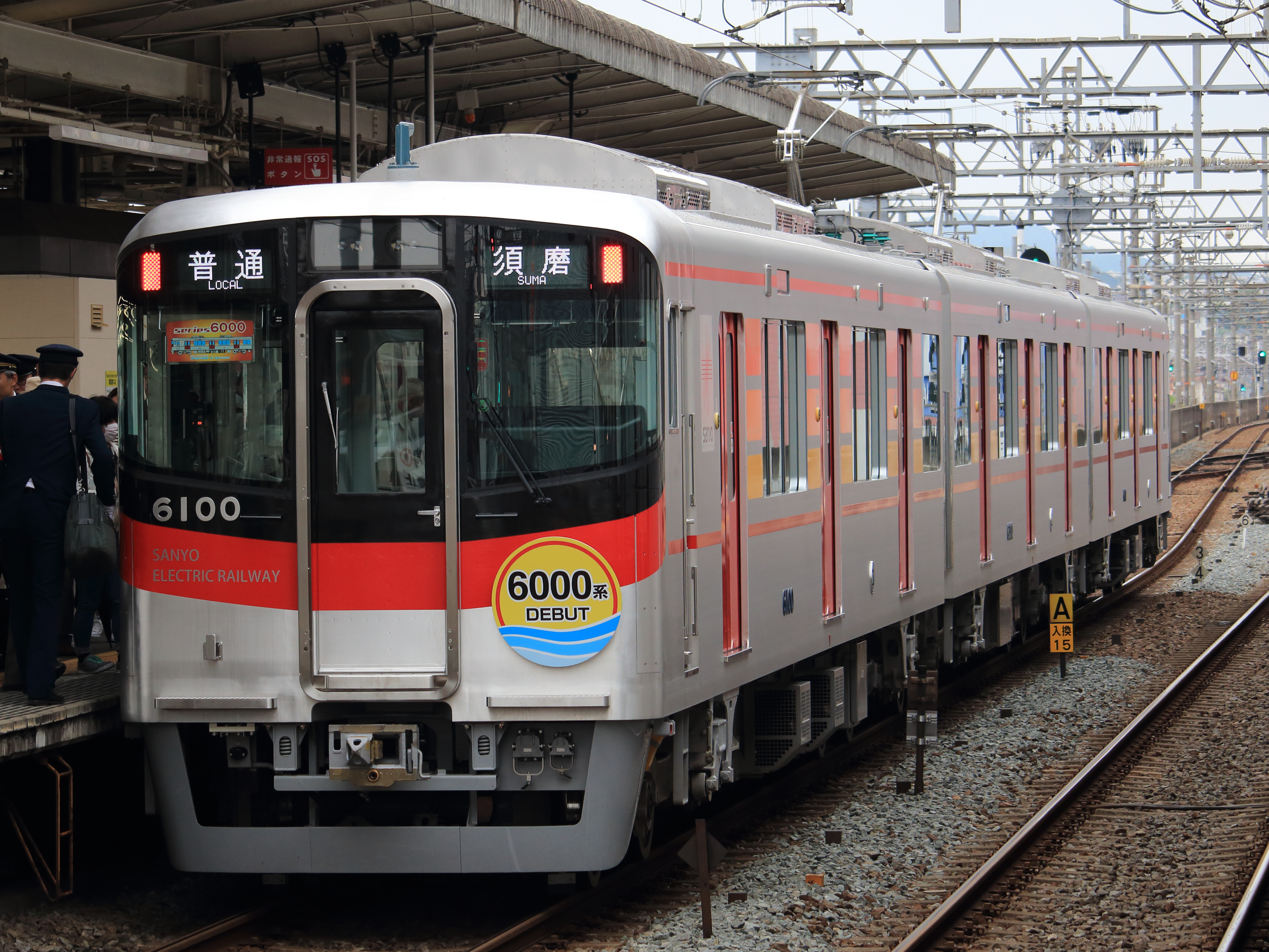
Car 6100 of set 6000, with a gangwayed cab end

=== Odd-numbered sets ===
Designation	Mc3	T	Mc4
Numbering	600x	630x	610x
Weight (t)	34.2	27.9	34.0
Capacity (total/seated)	122/41	135/49	122/41

The intermediate trailer cars are fitted with two single-arm pantographs.

== Interior ==
Passenger accommodation consists of longitudinal bench seating throughout. Seat width is 480 mm (19 in) per person. LED lighting is used.

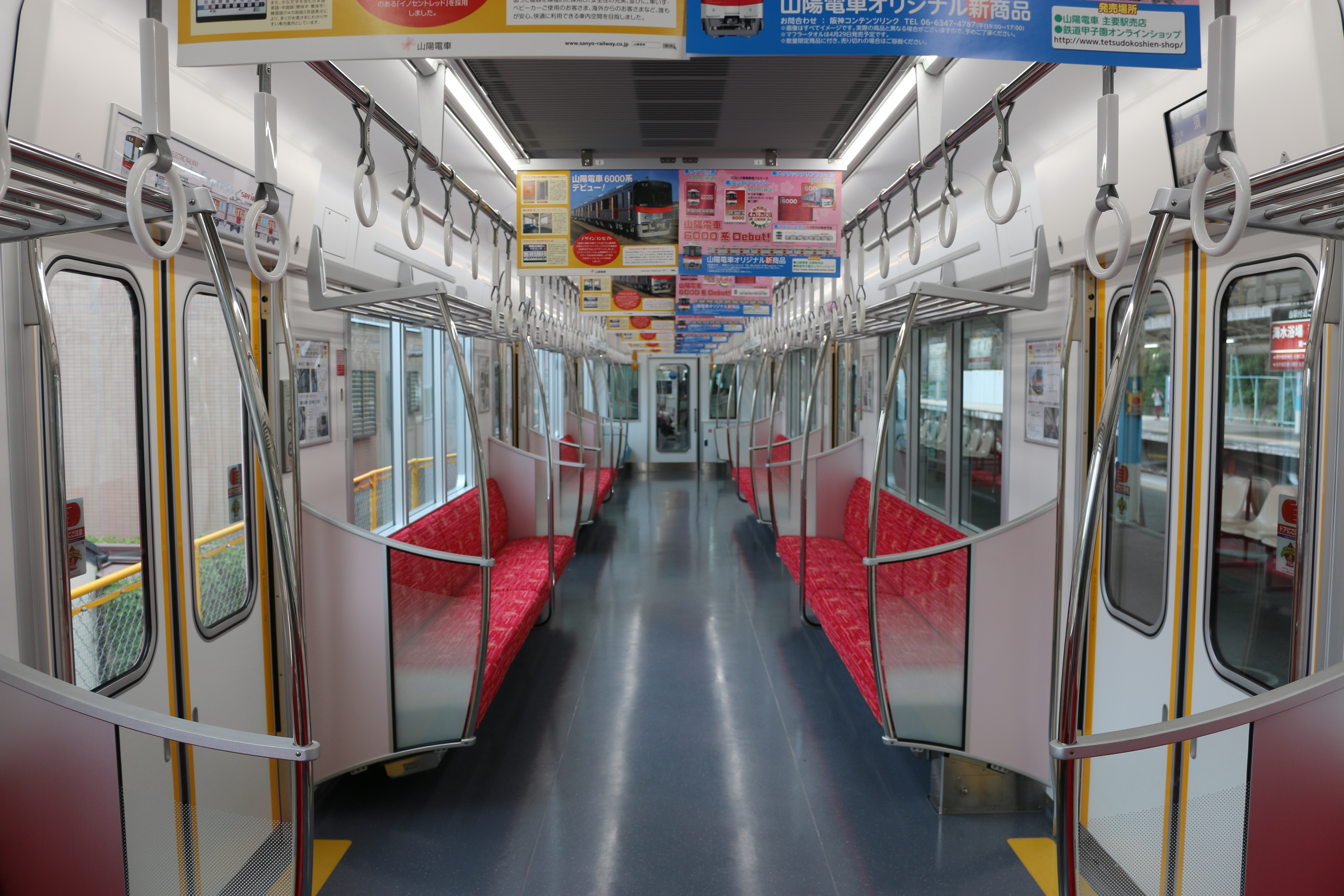
Interior view

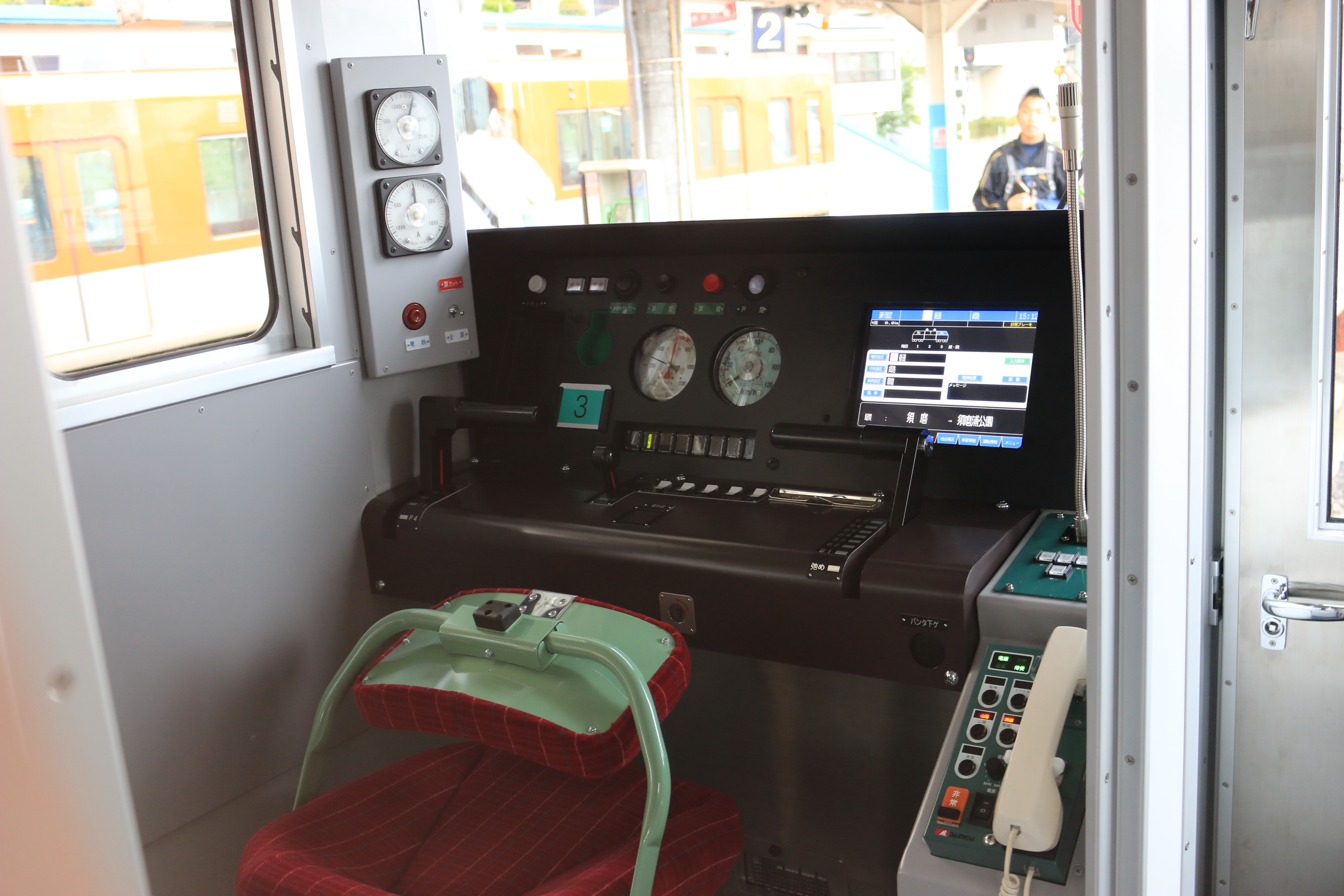
Driving cab interior

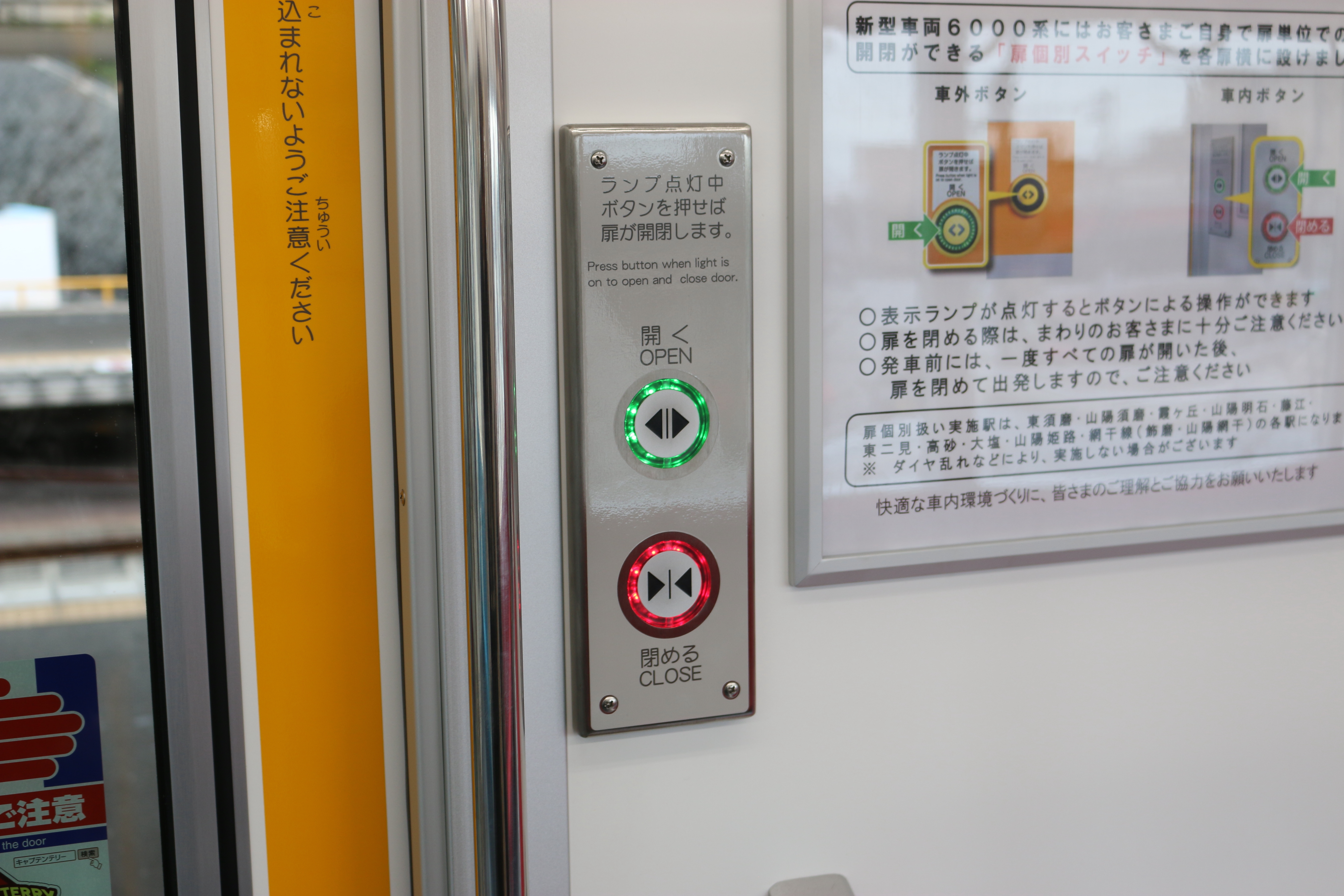
Interior passenger door controls

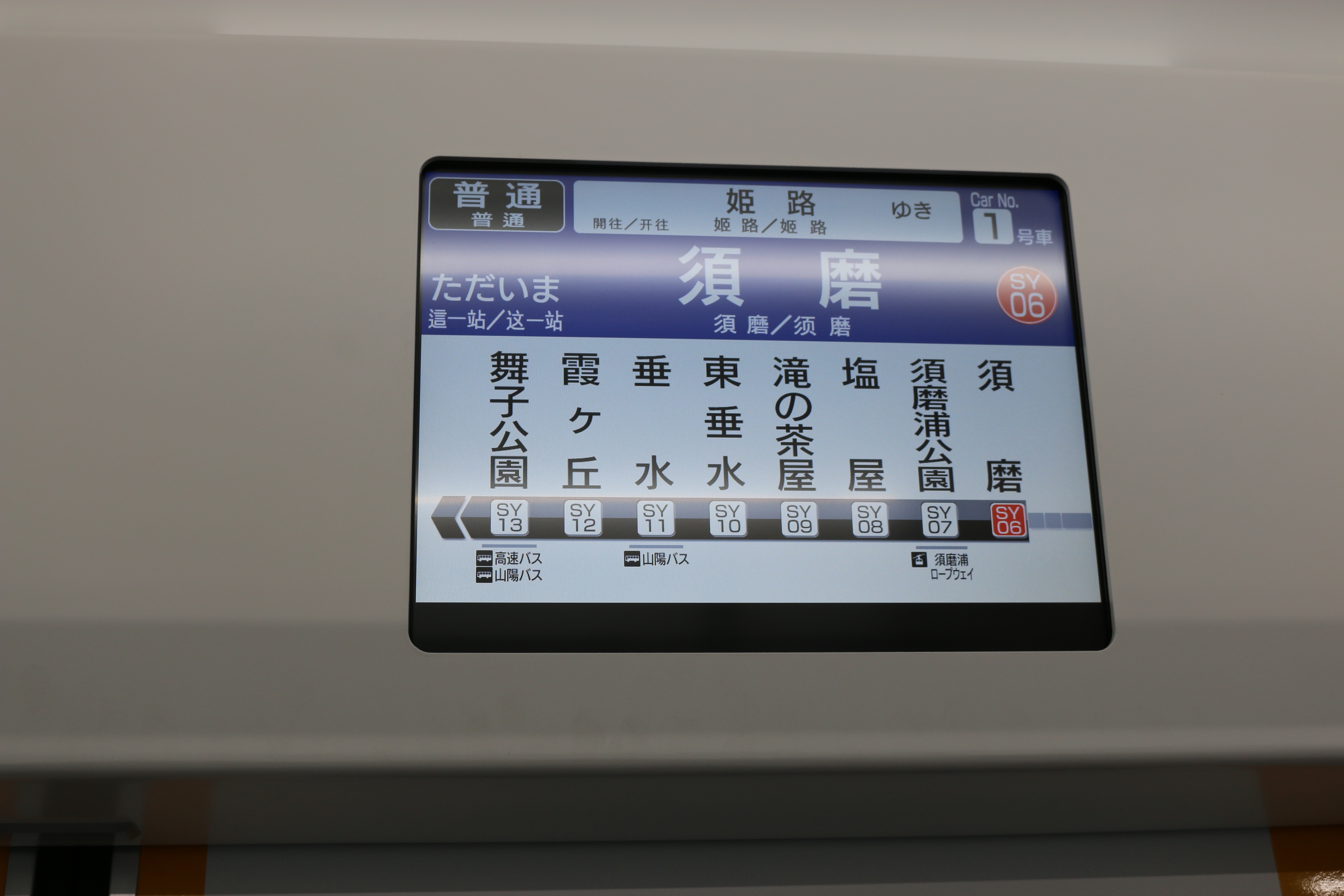
LCD passenger information display

== History ==
Details of the new trains on order were first announced by Sanyo Electric Railway in May 2015.

Set 6001, was delivered from the Kawasaki Heavy Industries factory in Kobe to the Sanyo Electric Railway depot at Higashi-Futami by road in November 2015.

The trains entered revenue service on 27 April 2016, with a departure ceremony held at Sanyo Himeji Station. Initially used only on the Sanyo Electric Railway Main Line, the trains also began operating on the Sanyo Electric Railway Aboshi Line from 17 May 2016.
