= Mega Station (Hyōgo) =

Railway station in Himeji, Hyōgo Prefecture, Japan

Mega Station 妻鹿駅
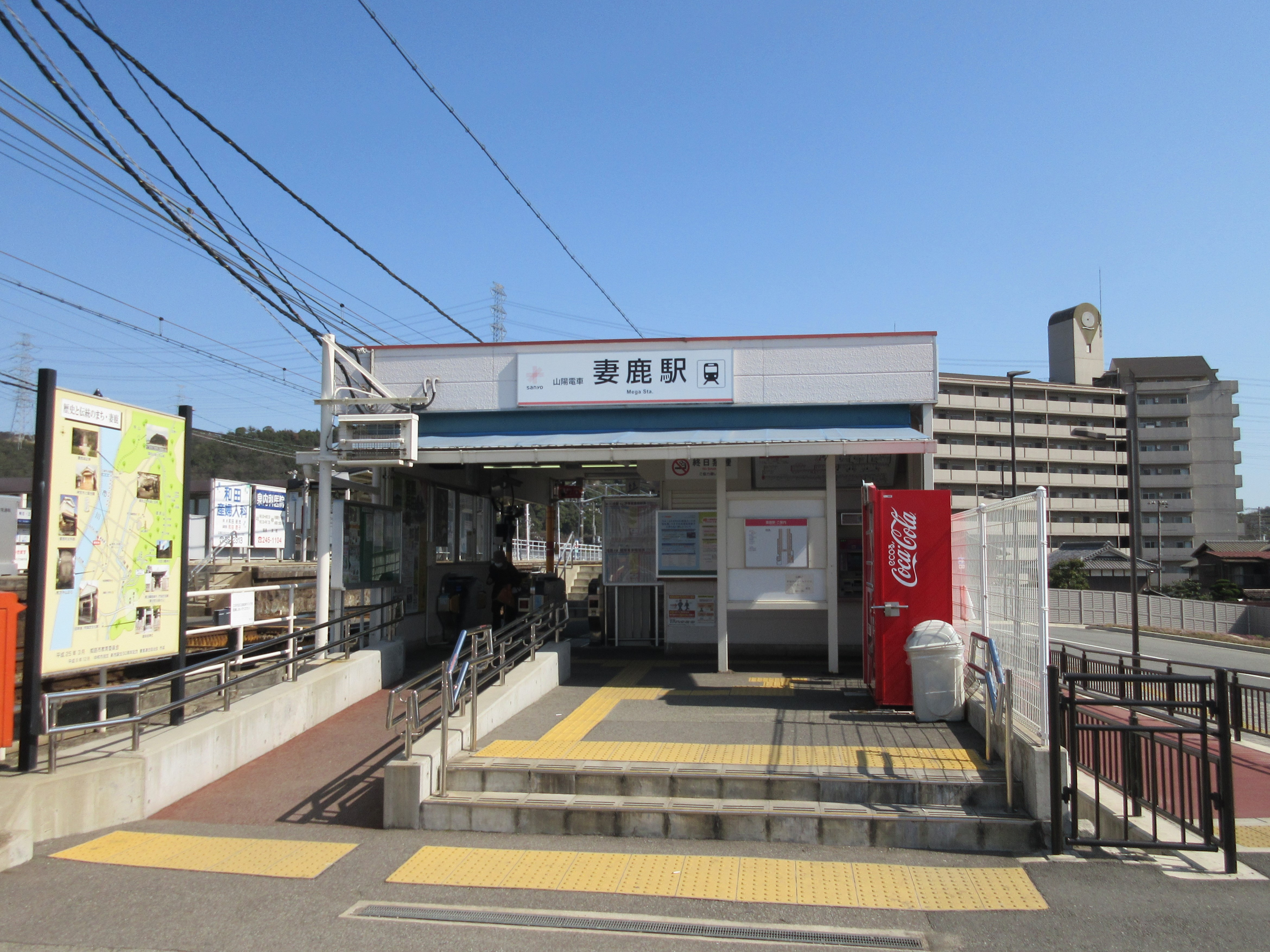
- Mega Station, March 2018

General information
- Location: Mega Shikamaku, Himeji-shi, Hyōgo-ken 672-8031; Japan
- Coordinates: 34°47′32″N 134°41′35″E
- Operator: Sanyo Electric Railway
- Line: ■ Main Line
- Distance: 49.0 km from Nishidai
- Platforms: 2 side platforms
- Connections

Other information
- Station code: SY39
- Website: Official website

History
- Opened: 19 August 1923

Passengers
- FY2019: 1367 (boarding only)
Location
- Location within Hyōgo Prefecture Location within Japan

Mega Station (妻鹿駅, Mega-eki) is a passenger railway station located in the city of Himeji, Hyōgo Prefecture, Japan, operated by the private Sanyo Electric Railway.

== Lines ==
Mega Station is served by the Sanyo Electric Railway Main Line and is 49.0 kilometers from the terminus of the line at Nishidai.

== Station layout ==
The station consists of two unnumbered ground-level side platforms connected by a level crossing. The station is unattended.

=== Platforms ===
station side	■ Main Line	for Shikama, Himeji and Sanyo-Aboshi
opposite side	■ Main Line	for Akashi, Kobe and Osaka

== Adjacent stations ==
«	Service	»
Sanyo Electric Railway
Sanyo Electric Railway Main Line
Shirahamanomiya	Sanyo Local	Shikama
Shirahamanomiya	S Limited Express	Shikama
Limited Express: Does not stop at this station

== History ==
Mega Station opened on August 19, 1923.

== Passenger statistics ==
In fiscal 2018, the station was used by an average of 1367 passengers daily (boarding passengers only).

== Surrounding area ==
- Himeji City Hall Citizen's Bureau Mega Service Center
- Mega Castle Ruins

== See also ==
- List of railway stations in Japan
