= Mega Station =

Mega Station is the name of multiple train stations in Japan.

- Mega Station (Hyōgo) - (妻鹿駅) in Hyōgo Prefecture
- Mega Station (Yamagata) - (女鹿駅) in Yamagata Prefecture
