= Himeji University =

Coordinates: 34°46′19″N 134°45′29″E

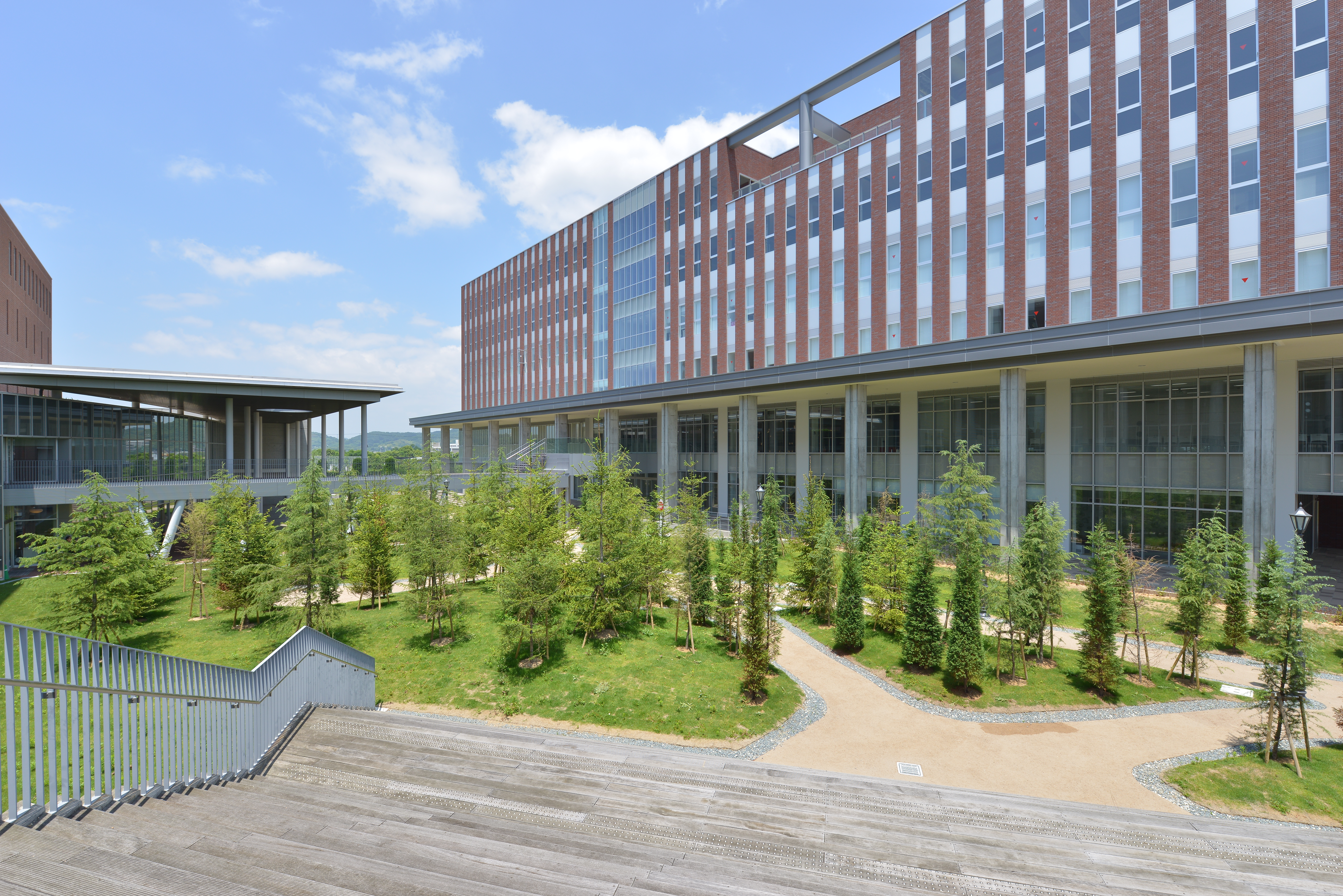
Himeji University

Himeji University (姫路大学, Himeji daigaku) is a private university in Himeji, Hyōgo, Japan. The predecessor of the school was founded in 1951, and it was chartered as a university in 2006.
