= Kenmei Women's Junior College =

Women's junior college in Japan

Kenmei Women’s Junior College
- 賢明女子学院短期大学
- Type: Private
- Faculty: English; Home Economics; Dietetics social Welfare
- Location: Himeji, Hyōgo, Japan
- Nickname: Kenmei Tandai

Kenmei Women’s Junior College (賢明女子学院短期大学, Kenmei Joshi Gakuin Tanki Daigaku) was a junior college in Himeji, Hyōgo, Japan.

The institute was founded in 1957. The predecessor of the school was founded in 1951. It closed in 2008. The Rivier Hall was built to celebrate Kenmei's 50th anniversary in 2007.

In a study, the researchers of the Department of Home Economics of this college found that alkaloids found in the curry leaves have many ideal antioxidant properties.
