= Sanyang =

Sanyang may refer to

- Sanyang Industry Co Ltd., a scooter company
- Sanyang (surname)
- Sanyang Station on the Gyeongbuk Line in South Korea
- Sanyang Plaza Station of the Wuxi Metro in China
- Sanyang Road Station of the Wuhan Metro in China
- Sanyang, a village in the Kombo South district in The Gambia
- Sanyang, a town in Jingshan County, Jingmen, Hubei
- The Hunt (Sanyang), a 2016 film
- Sanyang, a Chinese term meaning "infected with COVID-19 for a third time."
- Sanyang, a myeon in Mungyeong, North Gyeongsang Province, South Korea
