= Aboshi Line =

Railway line in Japan

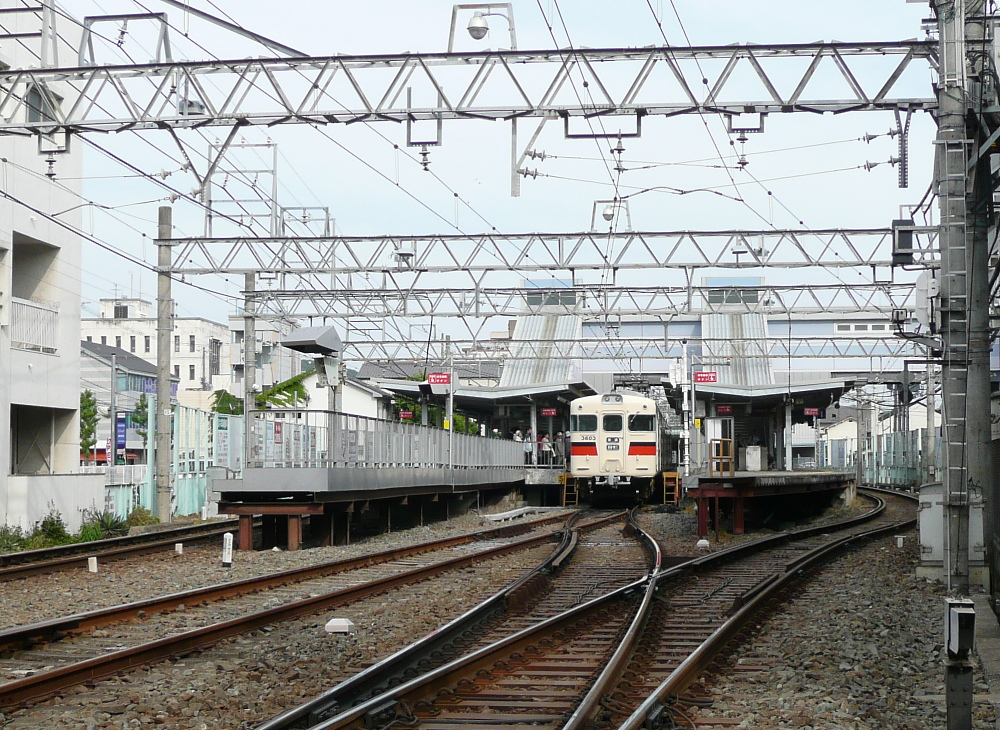
- A 3000 series EMU on an Aboshi Line service at Shikama Station, May 2008

Overview
- Native name: 網干線
- Status: In service
- Owner: Sanyo Electric Railway Co., Ltd.
- Line number: SY
- Locale: Hyogo Prefecture
- Termini: Shikama; Sanyo-Aboshi
- Stations: 7

Service
- Type: Commuter rail
- System: Sanyo Electric Railway
- Operator(s): Sanyo Electric Railway Co., Ltd.

History
- Opened: 15 October 1940; 86 years ago

Technical
- Line length: 8.5 km (5.3 mi)
- Number of tracks: Single
- Track gauge: 1,435 mm (4 ft 8 1/2 in)
- Minimum radius: 400 m
- Electrification: 1,500 V DC, overhead catenary
- Operating speed: 90 km/h (55 mph)

The Aboshi Line (網干線, Aboshi-sen) is an 8.5 km single-track railway line in Himeji, Hyōgo, Japan, operated by the private railway operator Sanyo Electric Railway. The line connects with the Sanyo Electric Railway Main Line at Shikama Station.

== Services ==
All trains on the line are local trains that stop at all stations. Services operate at 12 minute intervals during the rush hour and 15 minute intervals at all other times.

== Stations ==
No.	Name	Japanese	Distance (km)	Transfers	Location
SY 40	Shikama	飾磨	0.0	Sanyo Electric Railway Main Line	Himeji, Hyogo
SY 51	Nishi-Shikama	西飾磨	2.4		Himeji, Hyogo
SY 52	Yumesakigawa	夢前川	3.6		Himeji, Hyogo
SY 53	Hirohata	広畑	4.7		Himeji, Hyogo
SY 54	Sanyo-Temma	山陽天満	5.6		Himeji, Hyogo
SY 55	Hiramatsu	平松	7.3		Himeji, Hyogo
SY 56	Sanyo-Aboshi	山陽網干	8.5		Himeji, Hyogo

== Rolling stock ==
The line currently uses 6000 series three-car EMUs.

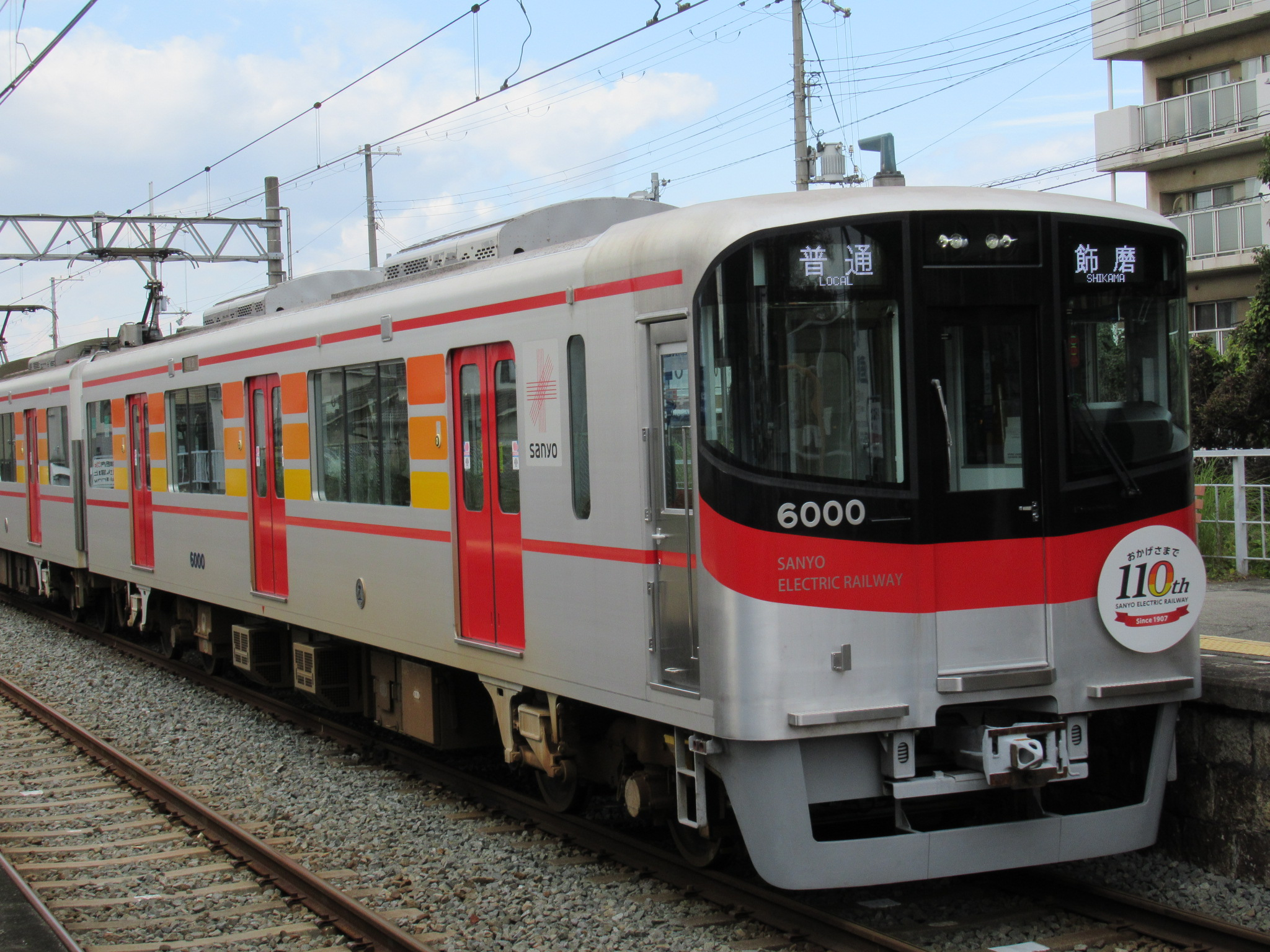
A 6000 series EMU

In the past, 3000 series and 5000 series EMUs were used.

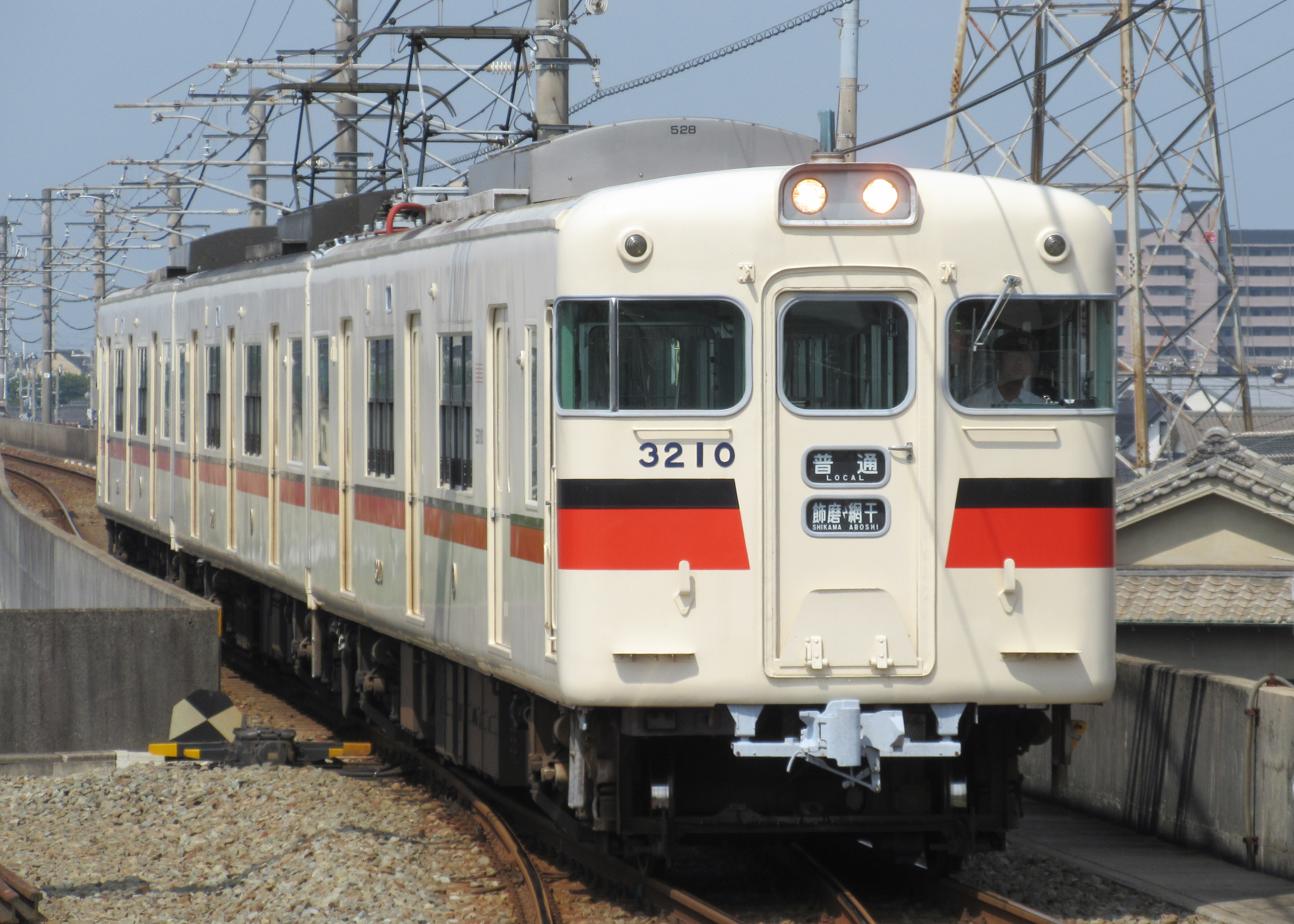
A 3000 series EMU

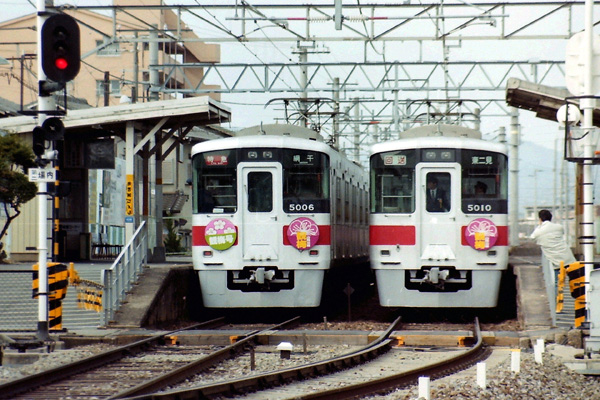
A 5000 series EMU

== History ==
The first section of the line opened on 15 October 1940, from Shikama to Yumesakigawa. This was extended to Hirohata on 23 December 1940, to Dentetsu-Temma (present-day Sanyo-Temma) on 27 April 1941, and the line to Dentetsu-Aboshi (present-day Sanyo-Aboshi) was completed on 6 July 1941.

Station numbering was introduced on Sanyo Electric Railway lines from 1 April 2014, with Aboshi Line stations numbered SY51 to SY56.

New 6000 series three-car EMUs entered service on the line on 17 May 2016.
