= Himeji =

Himeji 姫路市
- Core city
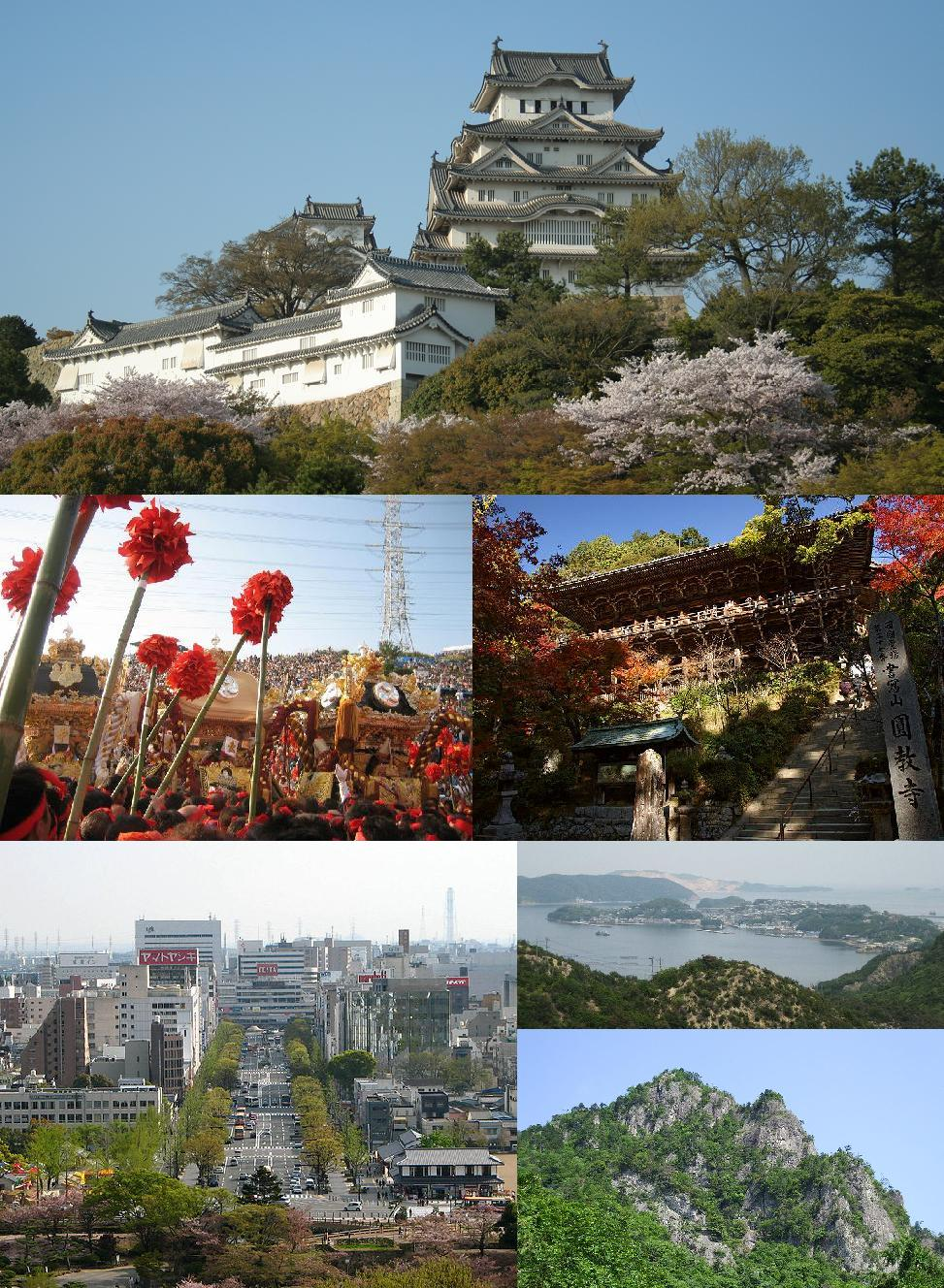
- Himeji Castle; Nada Fighting Festival, Engyō-ji; View from the castle, Ieshima, Mt. Seppiko

- Flag Emblem

- Location of Himeji in Hyōgo Prefecture

- Location in Japan
- Coordinates: 34°49′N 134°41′E
- Country: Japan
- Region: Kansai
- Prefecture: Hyōgo

Government
  - Mayor: Hideyasu Kiyomoto (from April 2019)

Area
  - Core city: 534.35 km^{2} (206.31 sq mi)

Population (2025)
  - Core city: 518,311
  - Rank: 26th in Japan
  - Density: 969.98/km^{2} (2,512.2/sq mi)
  - Urban: 773,389
  - Metro: 20,352,734 (Keihanshin Mega-Region)
- Time zone: UTC+09:00 (JST)
- City hall address: 4-1 Yasuda, Himeji-shi, Hyōgo-ken 670-8501
- Climate: Cfa
- Website: Official website
- Symbols
- Bird: White Heron
- Flower: Pecteilis radiata
- Tree: Evergreen Oak

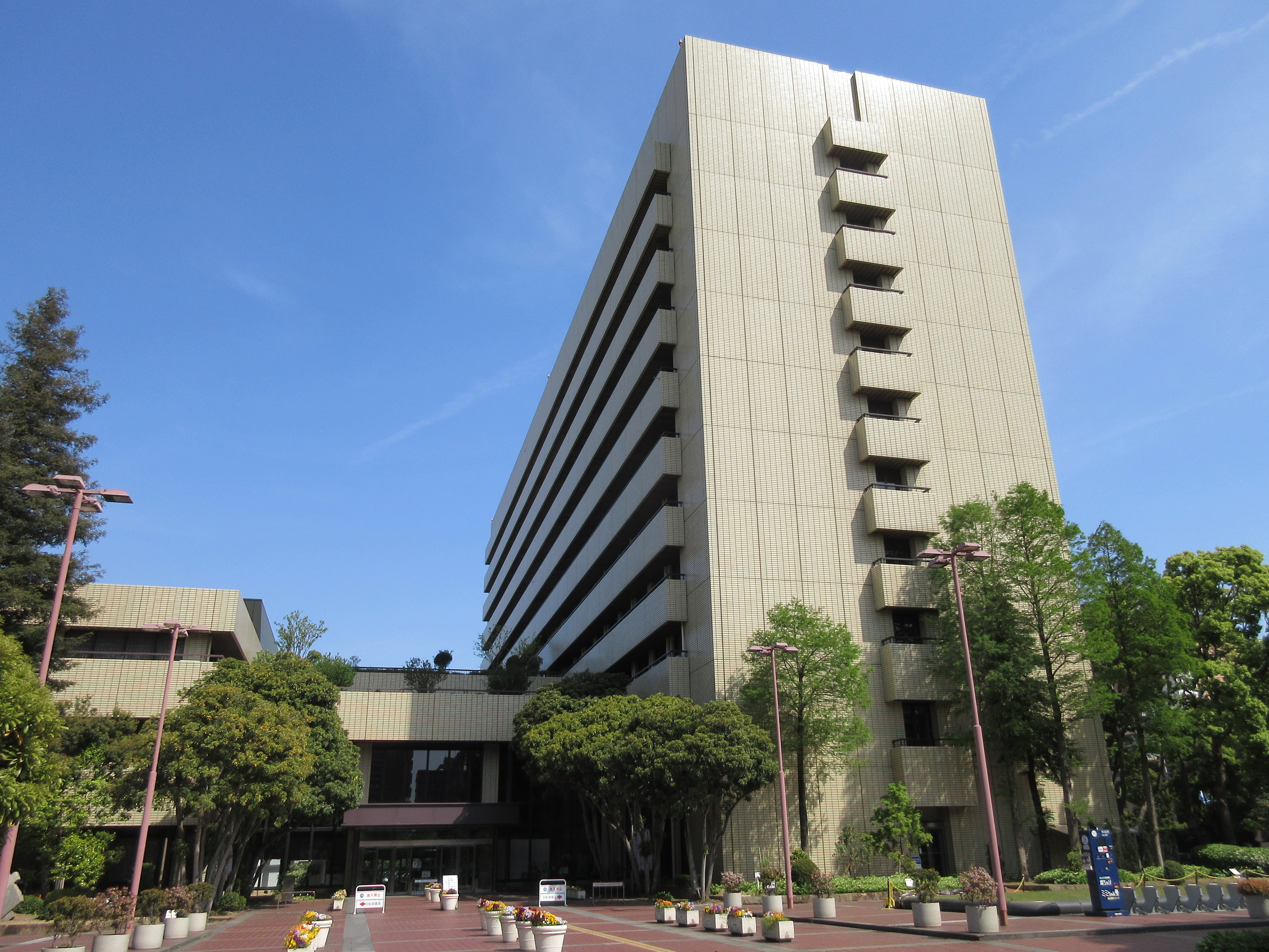
Himeji City Hall

Himeji (姫路市, Himeji-shi; Japanese pronunciation: [çì.mé̞.(ɟ̟͡)ʑí(.ɕì), çí.mè̞.(ɟ̟͡)ʑì]) is a city located in Hyōgo Prefecture in the Kansai region of Japan. As of 1 June 2022, the city had an estimated population of 525,682 in 227,099 households and a population density of 980 persons per km^{2}. The total area of the city is 534.35 square kilometres (206.31 sq mi).

== Geography ==
Himeji is located in the central western part of the Harima Plain in the western part of Hyogo Prefecture, and is the central city of the Harima region of the prefecture. The Ichikawa River is located in the central eastern part of the city, and the Senba River and Noda River are located in the center. The Ieshima Islands in the Seto Inland Sea are within the city limits and are located off the coast of Harima Bay. The city is surrounded by the mountains and the sea.

=== Neighbouring municipalities ===
Hyōgo Prefecture

- Ichikawa
- Kakogawa
- Kamikawa
- Kasai
- Shisō
- Taishi
- Takasago
- Tatsuno

=== Climate ===
Himeji has a humid subtropical climate (Köppen climate classification Cfa) with hot summers and cool winters. Summers are significantly wetter than winters. The average annual temperature in Himeji is 15.6 °C (60.1 °F). The average annual rainfall is 1,254.7 mm (49.40 in) with July as the wettest month. The temperatures are highest on average in August, at around 27.8 °C (82.0 °F), and lowest in January, at around 4.4 °C (39.9 °F). The highest temperature ever recorded in Himeji was 38.0 °C (100.4 °F) on 31 August 2020; the coldest temperature ever recorded was −10.0 °C (14.0 °F) on 24 January 1963.

Climate data for Himeji (1991−2020 normals, extremes 1948−present)
Month	Jan	Feb	Mar	Apr	May	Jun	Jul	Aug	Sep	Oct	Nov	Dec	Year
Record high °C (°F)	17.5 (63.5)	21.6 (70.9)	25.0 (77.0)	28.0 (82.4)	31.8 (89.2)	34.9 (94.8)	37.3 (99.1)	38.0 (100.4)	36.6 (97.9)	32.4 (90.3)	26.6 (79.9)	21.5 (70.7)	38.0 (100.4)
Mean maximum °C (°F)	14.4 (57.9)	16.7 (62.1)	20.3 (68.5)	24.9 (76.8)	28.6 (83.5)	31.1 (88.0)	34.5 (94.1)	35.6 (96.1)	33.3 (91.9)	28.2 (82.8)	22.7 (72.9)	17.3 (63.1)	35.8 (96.4)
Mean daily maximum °C (°F)	9.6 (49.3)	10.4 (50.7)	13.8 (56.8)	19.1 (66.4)	23.7 (74.7)	26.8 (80.2)	30.5 (86.9)	32.5 (90.5)	28.6 (83.5)	23.1 (73.6)	17.3 (63.1)	11.9 (53.4)	20.6 (69.1)
Daily mean °C (°F)	4.4 (39.9)	5.0 (41.0)	8.3 (46.9)	13.6 (56.5)	18.5 (65.3)	22.4 (72.3)	26.4 (79.5)	27.8 (82.0)	23.8 (74.8)	17.9 (64.2)	11.9 (53.4)	6.6 (43.9)	15.6 (60.0)
Mean daily minimum °C (°F)	0.2 (32.4)	0.5 (32.9)	3.2 (37.8)	8.2 (46.8)	13.5 (56.3)	18.5 (65.3)	23.0 (73.4)	24.0 (75.2)	19.8 (67.6)	13.4 (56.1)	7.3 (45.1)	2.4 (36.3)	11.2 (52.1)
Mean minimum °C (°F)	−3.6 (25.5)	−3.4 (25.9)	−1.8 (28.8)	1.1 (34.0)	7.4 (45.3)	13.3 (55.9)	19.4 (66.9)	19.8 (67.6)	13.9 (57.0)	7.2 (45.0)	1.6 (34.9)	−1.7 (28.9)	−4.3 (24.3)
Record low °C (°F)	−10.0 (14.0)	−7.8 (18.0)	−7.6 (18.3)	−2.0 (28.4)	1.5 (34.7)	7.9 (46.2)	13.0 (55.4)	14.3 (57.7)	8.9 (48.0)	1.7 (35.1)	−2.0 (28.4)	−7.4 (18.7)	−10.0 (14.0)
Average precipitation mm (inches)	36.9 (1.45)	48.6 (1.91)	92.0 (3.62)	104.7 (4.12)	127.3 (5.01)	160.4 (6.31)	184.3 (7.26)	105.4 (4.15)	177.8 (7.00)	108.7 (4.28)	61.2 (2.41)	47.5 (1.87)	1,254.7 (49.40)
Average snowfall cm (inches)	1 (0.4)	4 (1.6)	0 (0)	0 (0)	0 (0)	0 (0)	0 (0)	0 (0)	0 (0)	0 (0)	0 (0)	1 (0.4)	6 (2.4)
Average precipitation days (≥ 1.0 mm)	4.7	6.0	8.7	8.8	9.0	10.8	10.3	7.0	9.3	7.5	5.5	5.3	92.9
Average snowy days (≥ 1 cm)	0.3	0.8	0	0	0	0	0	0	0	0	0	0.4	1.5
Average relative humidity (%)	70	69	67	66	70	75	78	73	74	73	73	72	72
Mean monthly sunshine hours	149.1	142.5	173.7	191.8	203.1	156.0	172.1	209.9	158.8	167.4	154.8	155.1	2,034.4
Source: Japan Meteorological Agency

=== Demographics ===
Per Japanese census data, the population of Himeji in 2020 is 530,495 people. Himeji has been conducting censuses since 1920.

Historical population
Year	Pop.	±%
1920	209,208	—
1925	221,240	+5.8%
1930	232,805	+5.2%
1935	244,556	+5.0%
1940	270,719	+10.7%
1945	308,321	+13.9%
1950	325,329	+5.5%
1955	348,365	+7.1%
1960	372,824	+7.0%
1965	412,507	+10.6%
1970	447,666	+8.5%
1975	479,360	+7.1%
1980	494,825	+3.2%
1985	506,101	+2.3%
1990	509,129	+0.6%
1995	527,854	+3.7%
2000	534,969	+1.3%
2005	536,232	+0.2%
2010	536,338	+0.0%
2015	535,664	−0.1%
2020	530,495	−1.0%
Himeji population statistics

== History ==
Himeji has been the center of Harima Province since the Nara period, and was the location of the provincial capital and Harima Kokubun-ji. After the Battle of Sekigahara, Ikeda Terumasa received a fief at Harima Province and established the Himeji Domain. He expanded Himeji Castle and its castle town. Due to its location dominating the San'yōdō highway connecting the Kinai region with western Japan, Himeji was a major stronghold of the Tokugawa shogunate through the Bakumatsu period. Following the Meiji restoration, Himeji was the capital of "Himeji Prefecture" (later Shikama Prefecture) from 1871, which was merged into Hyōgo Prefecture in 1876. The city of Himeji was established on April 1, 1889, with the creation of the modern municipalities system. After the 1923 Great Kantō earthquake, the Japanese government reportedly considered moving the nation's capital from Tokyo to Himeji. On April 1, 1996, Himeji attained Core city status, with increased local autonomy.

On March 27, 2006, the town of Yasutomi (from Shisō District), the town of Kōdera (from Kanzaki District), and the towns of Ieshima and Yumesaki (both from Shikama District) were merged into Himeji.

=== Air raids ===
During World War II, Himeji was a target for the United States' XXI Bomber Command as it was an important rail terminal and contained two large military zones. The first air raid occurred on June 22, 1945 at 09:50, in which 60 B-29 Superfortress bombers centered on an area containing a Kawanishi Aircraft Company factory. The bombing killed 341 people and rendered 10,220 homeless. The second attack occurred on July 3, 1945, at 16:23, 107 aircraft dropped 767 tons of incendiary bombs on Himeji, destroying 63.3% of the built up areas of the city. However, the famous Himeji Castle, although blackened by smoke from the burning city, remained unscathed, even with one firebomb being dropped on it. This attack killed 173 people, severely wounded 160, and resulted in the destruction of 10,300 buildings, rendering 45,182 people homeless.

== Government ==
Himeji has a mayor-council form of government with a directly elected mayor and a unicameral city council of 46 members. Himeji contributes eight members to the Hyogo Prefectural Assembly. In terms of national politics, the city is divided between the Hyōgo 11th and Hyōgo 12th districts of the lower house of the Diet of Japan.

=== Mayors of Himeji City (1889–present) ===
#	Name '	Time of office		Terms
1	Kiyoshi Aridome (有留清)	July 1889	August 1898	9 years and 1 month
2	Shigeho Obata (小畑茂穂)	November 1898	July 1900	1 year and 8 months '
3	Chikaharu Ohno (大野親温)	November 1900	February 1901	3 months
4	Taketomi Otsuka (大塚武臣)	June 1901	April 1909	7 years and 10 months
5	Otokichi Hori (堀音吉)	June 1909	June 1915	6 years
6	Masayuki Inoue (井上正進)	November 1915	November 1919	4 years
7	Yoshihara Sugiyama (杉山義治)	April 1920	April 1924	4 years
8	Nagahiko Shigeoka (滋岡長彦)	September 1924	February 1930	6 years
9	Fukuzo Sato (佐藤復三)	August 1930	August 1934	4 years
10	Toshinobu Tadera (田寺俊信)	September 1934	September 1938	4 years

#	Name	Time of office		Terms
11	Hisashi Kurashige (蔵重久)	May 1939	June 1939	1 month
12	Kankichi Tsuboi (坪井勧吉)	September 1939	September 1943	4 years
13	Soubei Hara (原惣兵衛)	October 1943	April 1946	2 years and 6 months
14	Kokichi Miyagaki (宮垣幸吉)	April 1946	June 1946	2 months
15	Motohide Iwami (石見元秀)	July 1946	April 1967	20 years and 9 months
16	Toyonobu Yoshida (吉田豊信)	April 1967	April 1983	16 years
17	Matsuji Totani (戸谷松司)	April 1983	April 1995	12 years
18	Kazuhiro Horikawa (堀川和洋)	April 1995	April 2003	8 years
19	Toshikatsu Iwami (石見利勝)	April 2003	April 2019	16 years
20	Hideyasu Kiyomoto (清元秀泰)	April 2019	present	Current

== Economy and Tourism ==
Himeji is located within the Hanshin Industrial Area and Harima Seaside Industrial Areas. The coastal region is heavily industrialized, with steel mills, chemical plants, semiconductor and automobile electronics predominating. In addition, Kansai Electric Power's Himeji No. 1 Power Station and Himeji No. 2 Power Station are located in the area. The northern two-thirds of the city is mainly agricultural and commercial fishing off the southern seacoast also plays a role in the economy. Traditional crafts include the production of butsudan (Buddhist altars), leather crafts, glue, matchmaking and candles.

Himeji lies near the famous “Golden Route” tourist itinerary, which stretches from Tokyo west to Osaka. Himeji is about 1.5 hours west of Osaka by train. Himeji faces the scenic Seto Inland Sea and boasts one of Japan’s best-preserved feudal-era castles. In the Himeji area, tourists can experience a medium-sized Japanese city away from the crowds of Osaka and other large cities.

== Education ==
=== Colleges and universities ===
- Himeji Dokkyo University
- Himeji Hinomoto College
- Himeji University
- Kenmei Women's Junior College (1951–2008)
- University of Hyogo - Himeji Institute of Technology

=== Primary and secondary schools ===
Himeji has 66 public elementary schools, 32 public middle schools and three public high schools operated by the city government and 13 public high schools operated by the Hyōgo Prefectural Department of Education. There are also four private combined middle/high schools. There are also four special education school for the handicapped, one operated by the city and three by the prefecture.

A North Korean school, Seiban North Korean Elementary and Middle School (西播朝鮮初中級学校), can also be found in the city.

== Transportation ==
=== Railway ===
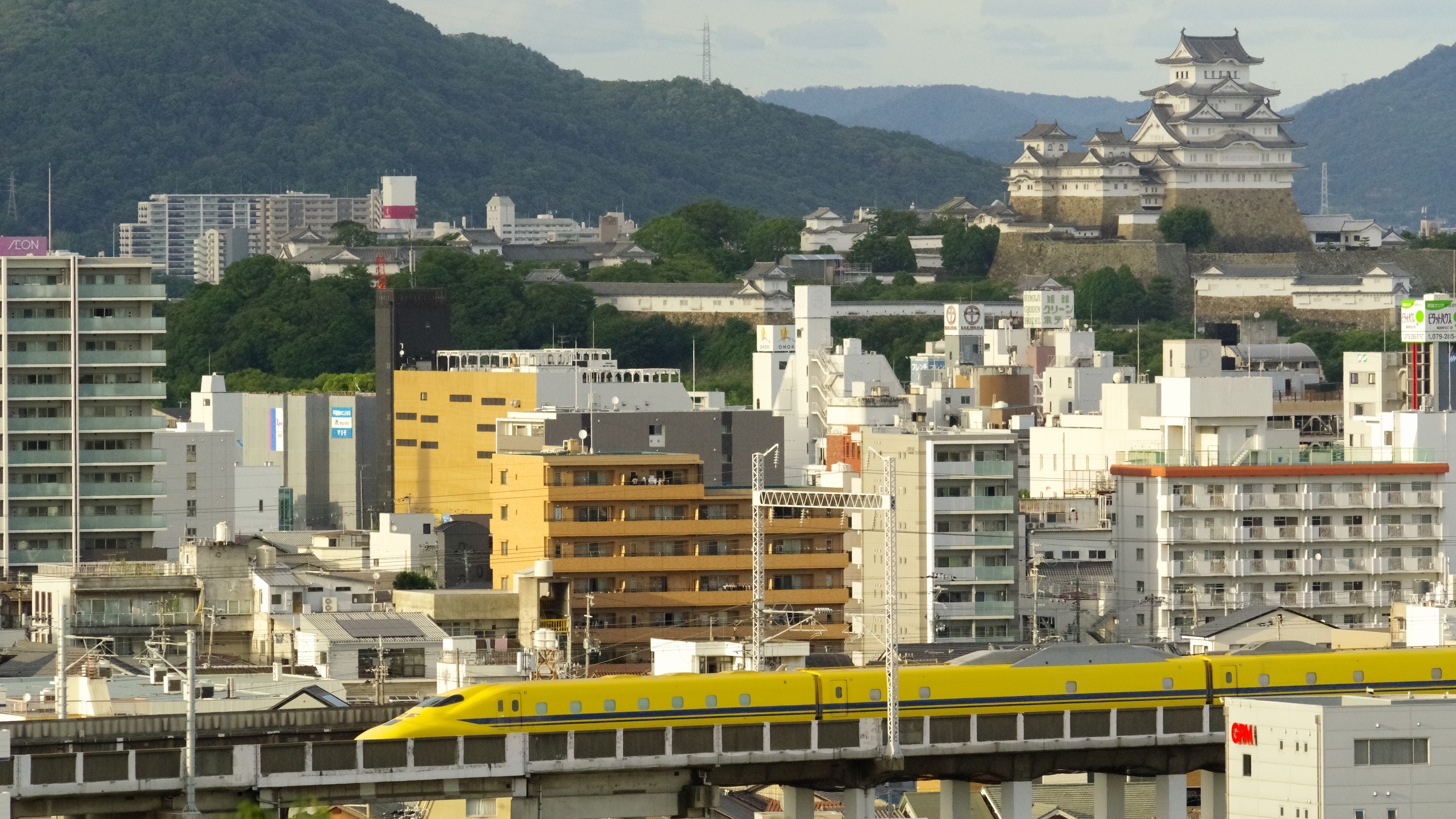
San'yō Shinkansen running through the city of Himeji

JR West – San'yō Shinkansen

- Himeji

JR West – San'yō Main Line (JR Kobe Line)

- Himeji-Bessho - Gochaku - Higashi-Himeji - Himeji - Tegarayamaheiwakōen - Agaho - Harima-Katsuhara - Aboshi

JR West – Bantan Line

- Himeji - Kyōguchi - Nozato - Tohori - Nibuno - Kōro - Mizoguchi

JR West – Kishin Line

- Himeji - Harima-Takaoka - Yobe - Ōichi

Sanyo Electric Railway - Main Line

- Ōshio - Matogata - Yaka - Shirahamanomiya - Mega - Shikama - Kameyama - Tegara - Sanyo Himeji

Sanyo Electric Railway - Aboshi Line

- Shikama - Nishi-Shikama - Yumesakigawa - Hirohata - Sanyo-Temma - Hiramatsu - Sanyo-Aboshi

=== Highways ===
- San'yō Expressway
- Chūgoku Expressway
- Bantan Renraku Road
- National Route 2
- National Route 29
- National Route 179
- National Route 250
- National Route 312
- National Route 372
- National Route 436

=== Ferries ===
- Bozeki Kisen: Himeji Kazuma Port - Tanga Island - Boze Island
- Kosoku Ieshima: Himeji Kazuma Port - Iejima
- Shodoshima Ferry: Himeji Kazuma Port-Fukuda Port (Shōdoshima)
- Takafuku Liner: Himeji Kazuma Port - Iejima

=== Air ===
The city does not have it own airport. The nearest airports are:

- Kobe Airport providing domestic and some international travel. It is located 66 km (41 mi) to the east.
- Kansai International Airport provides a large number of international and domestic destinations. It is located 127 km (79 mi) to the south east.

== International relations ==
Himeji is twinned or has sister city relationships with six international cities and two Japanese cities, as well as a sister castle located in France. Himeji has a particularly strong relationship with Phoenix, Arizona, as teachers from America are able to teach English abroad for 1–2 years. Additionally, the Youth Ambassador Exchange Program allows for both Japanese and American high school students to experience the cultures and languages of their respective countries for 3 weeks.

=== Sister cities ===
==== International ====
- Adelaide, South Australia, Australia
- Changwon, South Gyeongsang, South Korea
- Charleroi, Belgium
- Curitiba, Paraná, Brazil
- Phoenix, Arizona, United States
- Taiyuan, Shanxi, China

==== Japan ====
- Matsumoto, in Nagano Prefecture
- Tottori, capital city in Tottori Prefecture

==== Sister castles ====
- Château de Chantilly in Chantilly, France
- Conwy Castle (Castell Conwy) in North Wales, since October 2019

== Local attractions ==
- Engyō-ji temple
- Harima Kokubun-ji ruins, National Historic Site
- Himeji Castle, a UNESCO World Heritage Site. For over 400 years, Himeji Castle has remained intact, even throughout the extensive bombing of Himeji in World War II and natural disasters such as the 1995 Great Hanshin earthquake and various typhoons.
- Himeji Central Park (a safari park)
- Himeji City Tegarayama Botanical Garden
- Koko-en Garden
- Mount Seppiko
- Okishio Castle - A castle ruin, Home castle of the Akamatsu clan.
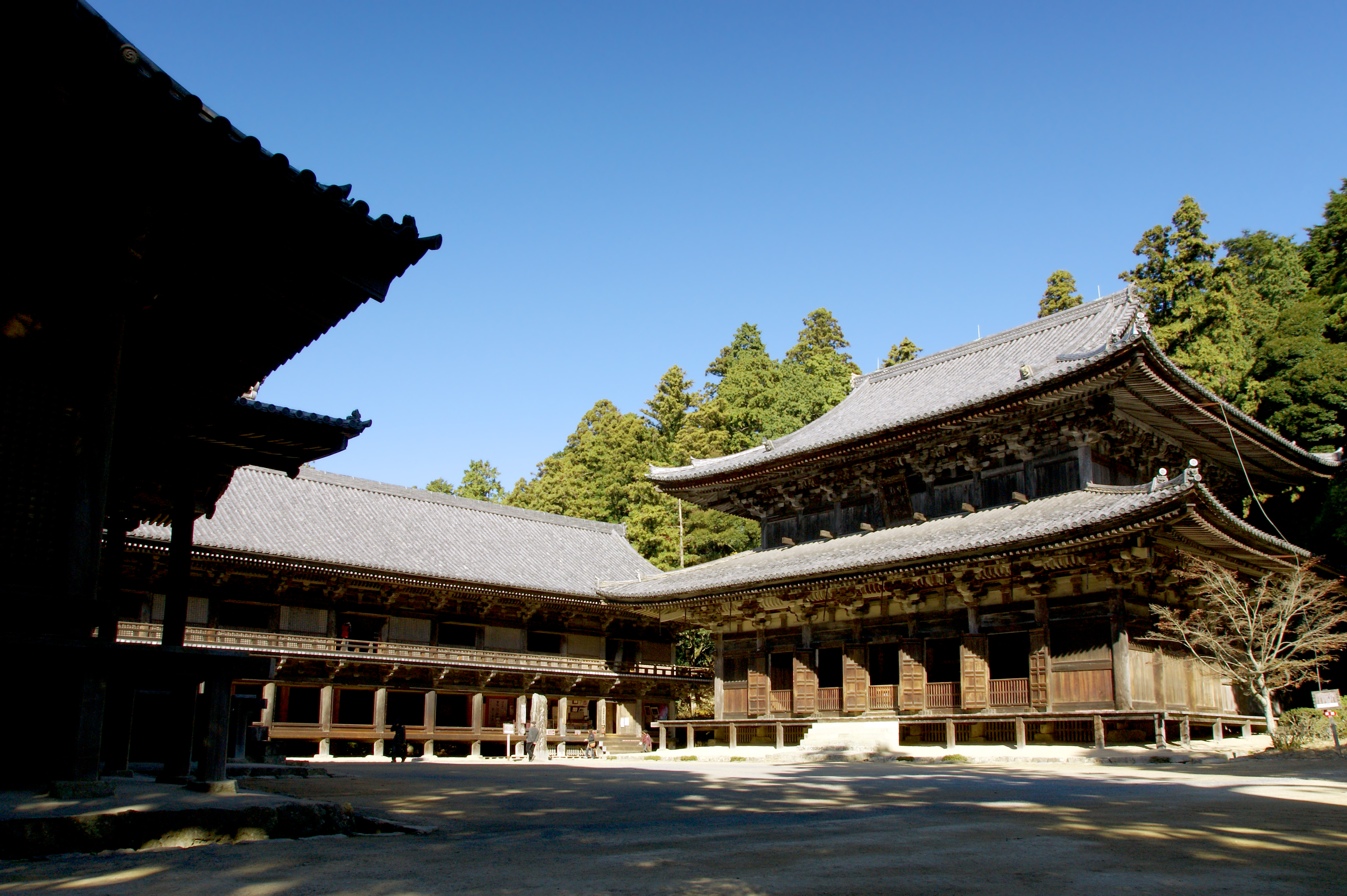
Engyō-ji

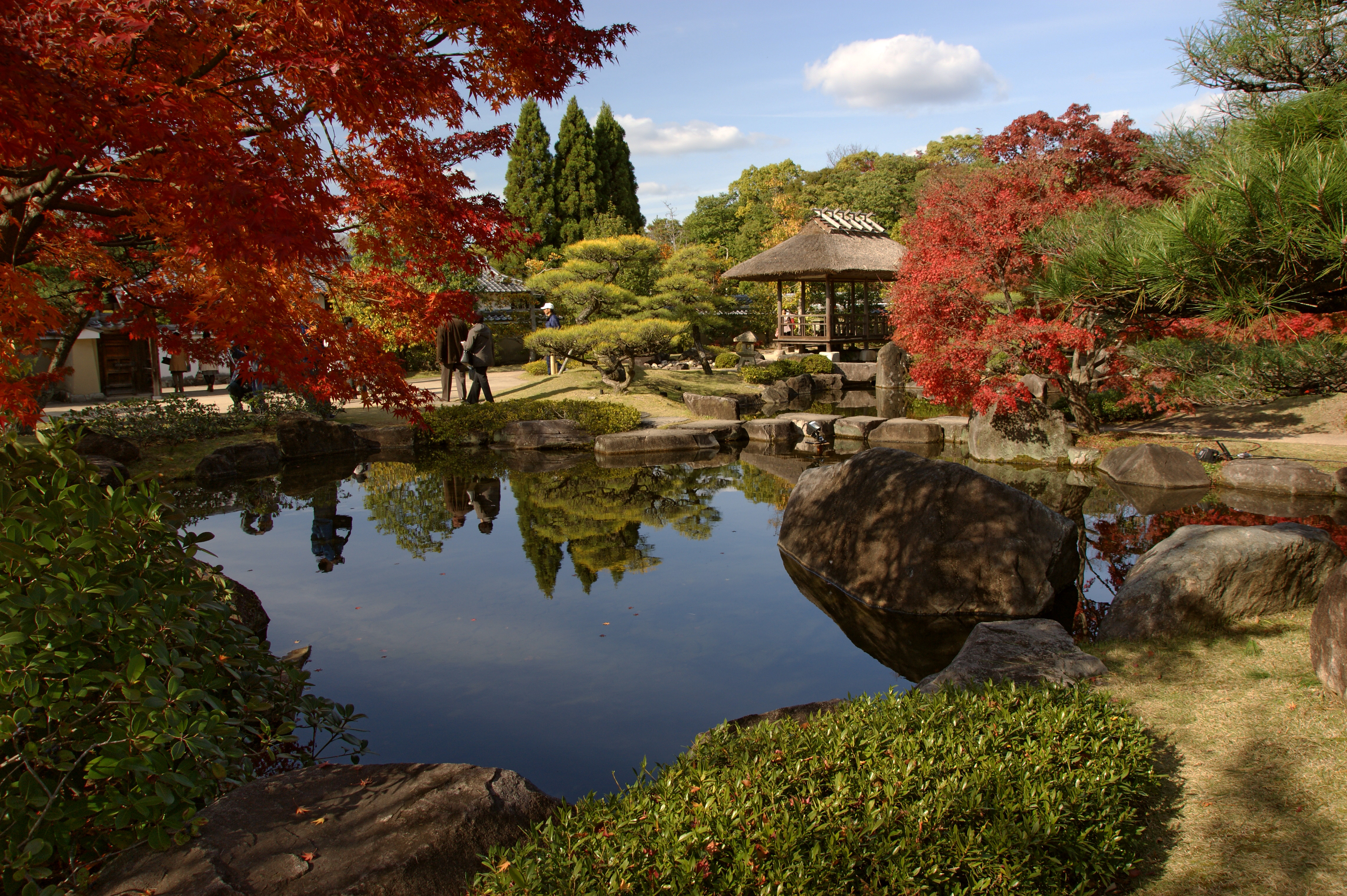
Koko-en Garden

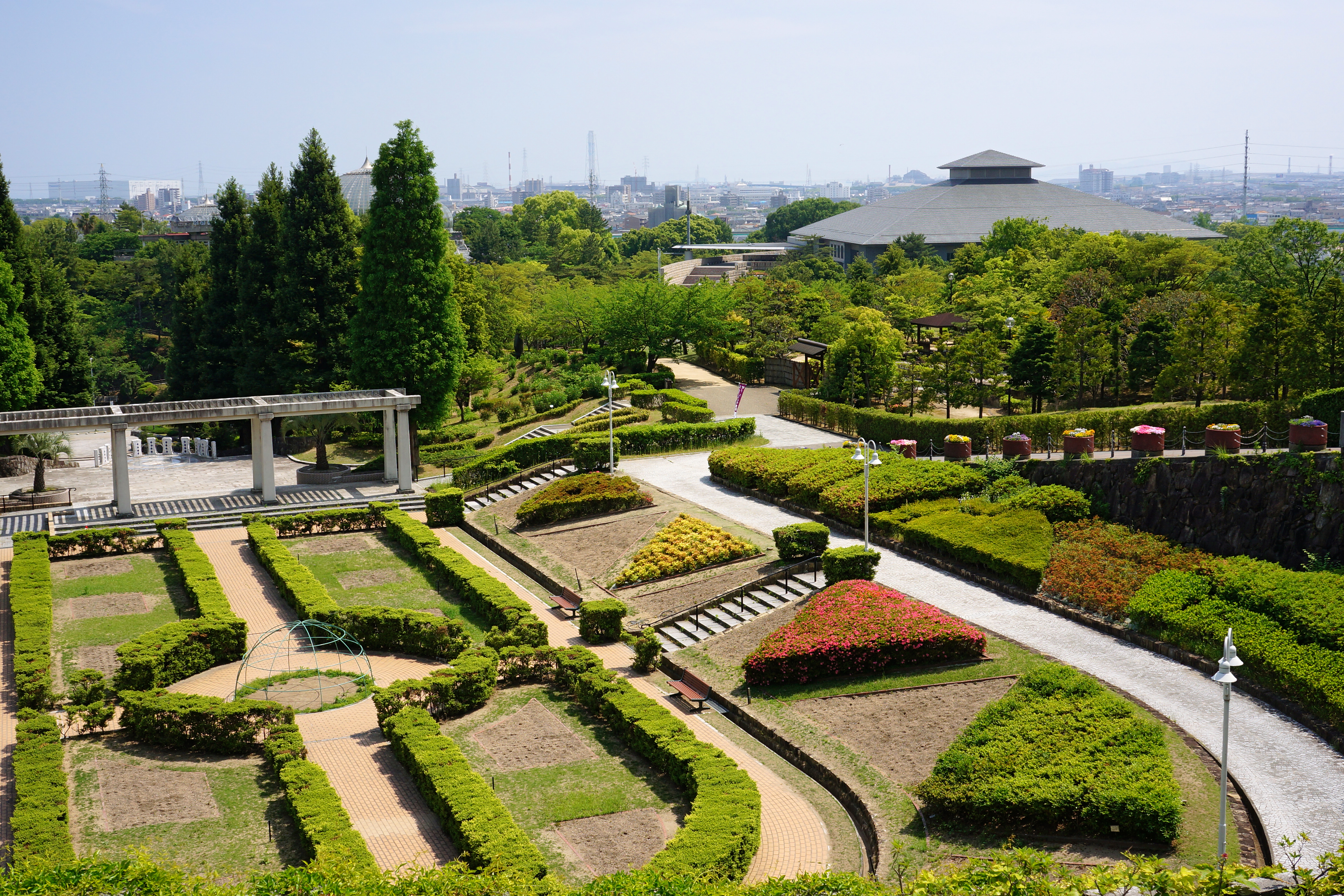
Tegarayama Central Park

== Notable people from Himeji ==
- Kuroda Kanbei (黒田 官兵衛) (1546–1604), famed strategist under Toyotomi Hideyoshi
- Mikinosuke Kawaishi (川石 酒造之助) (1899–1969), judoka
- Aya Matsuura (松浦 亜弥) (1986-), entertainer
- Psycho le Cému (サイコ・ル・シェイム), visual kei rock band
- Kenzō Takada (高田 賢三) (1939–2020), fashion designer
- Masahisa Takenaka (竹中 正久) (1933–1985), the 4th kumicho of Yamaguchi-gumi, Japan's largest yakuza syndicate
- Tetsuro Watsuji (和辻 哲郎) (1889–1960), philosopher and historian
