= Sanyo (disambiguation) =

In Japan, Sanyo (Hepburn spelling: San'yō) can refer to:

- Sanyo Electric Co., Ltd. (三洋)
- Sanyo Shokai, apparel retailer
- Sanyo Denki Co., Ltd. (山洋)
- Sanyo Foods. Co., Ltd (サンヨー), an instant noodles manufacturer in Japan
- San'yō region (山陽) near Seto Inland Sea, Japan
  - San'yō Main Line, main railway line in western Japan
  - San'yō Shinkansen, high-speed rail line in western Japan
  - Sanyō Railway, the former operator of the Sanyō Main Line and its branches
  - Sanyo Electric Railway, a private railway company in Hyōgo Prefecture, Japan
- Sannyo Komakusa, a fictional character in Unconnected Marketeers from the video game franchise, Touhou Project

== See also ==
- Sany
