= Sanyang (surname) =

Sanyang is a Gambian surname. Notable people with the surname include:

- Abdoulie Sanyang (born 1999), Gambian footballer
- Amadou Sanyang (born 1991), Gambian footballer
- Ismaila Sanyang, Gambian Agricultural Minister
- Kukoi Sanyang (1952–2013), Gambian rebel
- Youssoupha Sanyang (born 2005), Gambian footballer
