= Sanyo-Himeji Station =

Railway station in Himeji, Hyōgo Prefecture, Japan

Sanyo-Himeji Station 山陽姫路駅
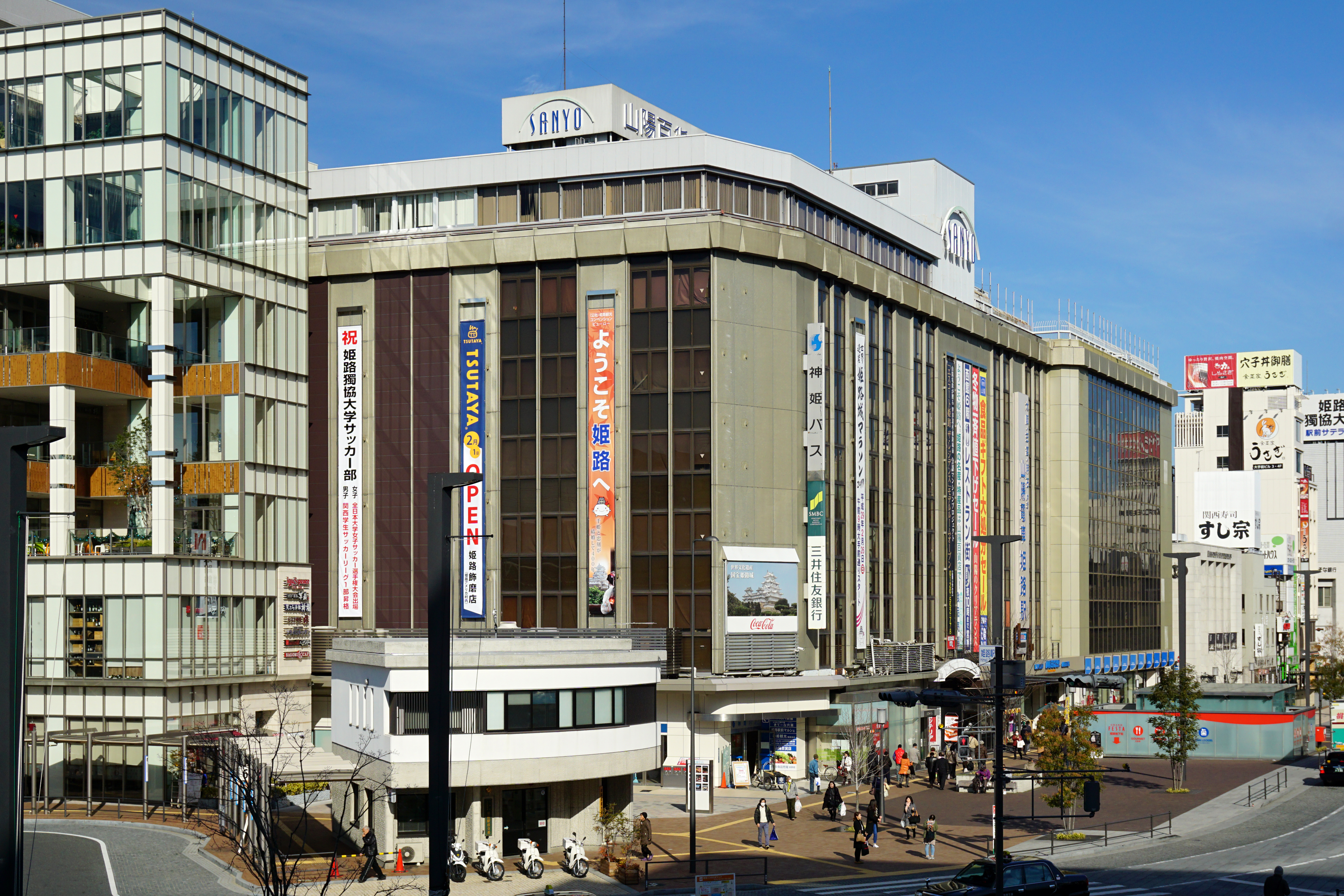
- Sanyo Department Store containing the train station.

General information
- Location: 1 Minamimachi, Himeji-shi, Hyōgo-ken 670-0912; Japan
- Coordinates: 34°49′43.75″N 134°41′23.27″E
- Operator: Sanyo Electric Railway
- Line: Main Line
- Distance: 54.7 km from Nishidai
- Platforms: 4 bay platforms
- Connections

Other information
- Station code: SY43
- Website: Official website

History
- Opened: 19 August 1923
- Former names: Himeji-ekimae; Dentetsu Himeji (until 1991)

Passengers
- FY2019: 14,948 (boarding only)

Services
Preceding station	Sanyo Electric Railway	Following station
Shikama towards Higashi-Futami	Main Line Limited Express	Terminus
Shikama towards Nishidai	Main Line Direct Limited Express S Limited Express	Terminus
Tegara towards Nishidai	Main Line Local	Terminus
Location
- Location within Hyōgo Prefecture Location within Japan

Sanyo-Himeji Station (山陽姫路駅, San'yō Himeji-eki) is a passenger railway station located in the city of Himeji, Hyōgo Prefecture, Japan, operated by the private Sanyo Electric Railway.

== Lines ==
Sanyo-Himeji Station is the western terminus of the Sanyo Electric Railway Main Line and is 54.7 kilometers from the opposing terminus of the line at Nishidai.

== Station layout ==
The station consists of four bay platforms on the second floor of the station building. The station is staffed.

=== Platforms ===
1, 2	■ Main Line	for Shikama, Akashi, Kobe and Osaka normal services
3, 4	■ Main Line	for Shikama, Sanyo-Akashi, Sannomiya, Osaka (express services)

== History ==
Sanyo-Himeji Station opened on 19 August 1923 as Himeji-ekimae Station (路駅前駅). It was renamed Dentetsu Himeji Station (電鉄姫路駅) on 20 November 1943.

The station was burned down in 1946, and by 1954 the station was rebuilt into an elevated structure.

It was renamed to its present name on 7 April 1991.

== Passenger statistics ==
In fiscal 2018, the station was used by an average of 4,948 passengers daily (boarding passengers only).

== Surrounding area ==
The station building is located close to the JR West Himeji Station on the Sanyō Main Line and Sanyō Shinkansen.

- Himeji City Hall Citizen's Bureau Mega Service Center
- Mega Castle Ruins

== See also ==
- List of railway stations in Japan
