= Shanyang =

Shanyang may refer to the following locations in China:

- Shanyang County (山阳县), county in Shaanxi
  - Shanyang Formation (山阳组), geological formation
- Shanyang District (山阳区), Jiaozuo, Henan
- Huai'an District, Jiangsu, formerly Shanyang County
- Shanyang Commandery (山陽郡), historical commandery in China
- Shanyang, Gutian County (杉洋镇), town in Fujian
