= Shikama Station =

Railway station in Himeji, Hyōgo Prefecture, Japan

Shikama Station 飾磨駅
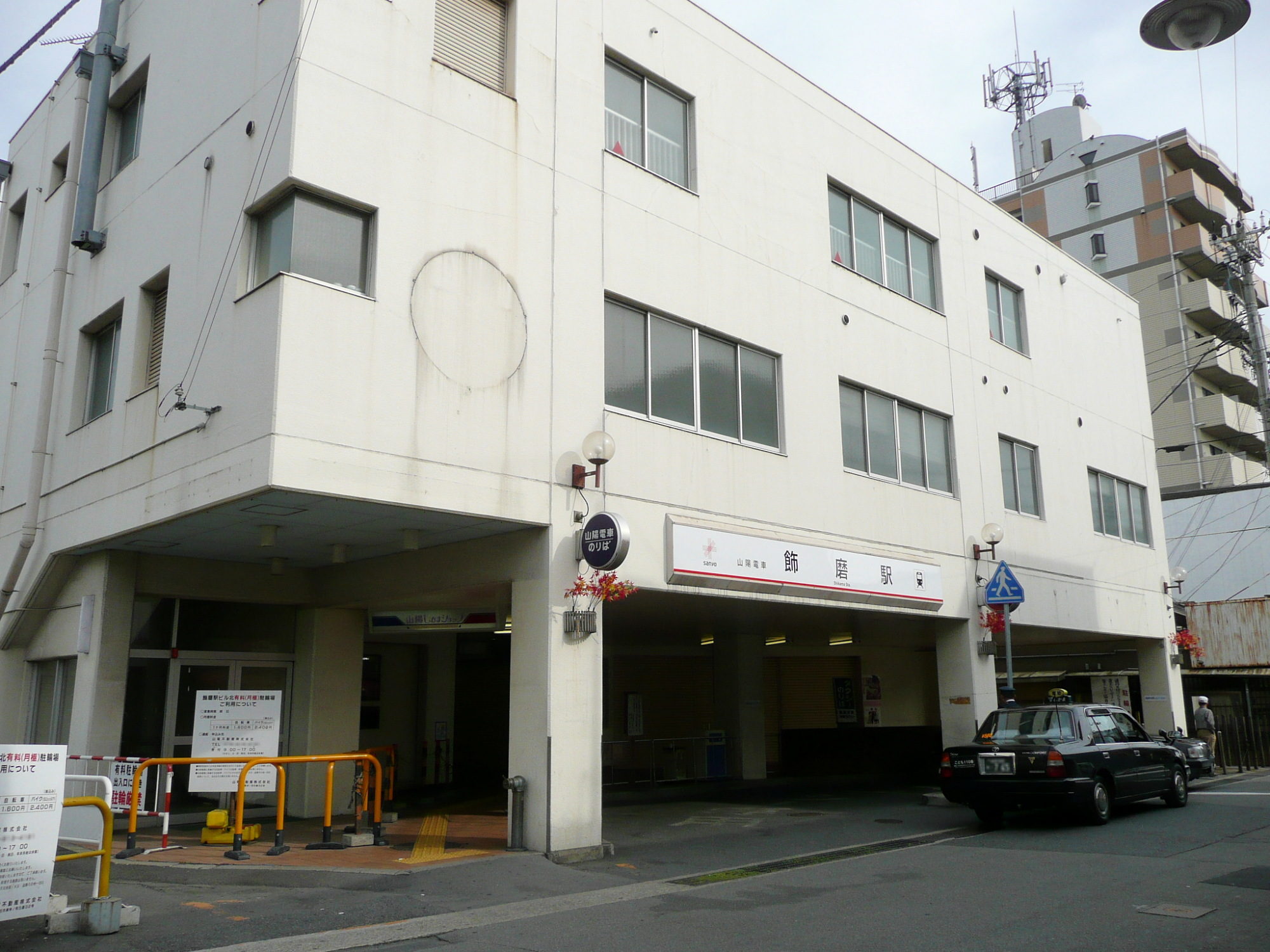
- Station entrance (May 2008)

General information
- Location: Shikamaku Tamachi, Himeji-shi, Hyōgo-ken 672-8052; Japan
- Coordinates: 34.799779°N 134.6748734°E
- Operator: Sanyo Electric Railway
- Lines: Main Line; Aboshi Line
- Distance: 50.9 km from Nishidai
- Platforms: 1 bay platform
- Connections

Other information
- Station code: SY40
- Website: Official website

History
- Opened: 19 August 1923
- Former names: Shikamamachi (to 1924); Dentetsu Shikama (to 1991)

Passengers
- FY2019: 4791 (boarding only)

Services
Preceding station	Sanyo Electric Railway	Following station
Ōshio towards Nishidai	Main Line Limited Express	Terminus
Ōshio towards Nishidai	Main Line Direct Limited Express	Sanyo-Himeji Terminus
Shirahamanomiya towards Nishidai	Main Line Direct Limited Express (rush-hour service)	Sanyo-Himeji Terminus
Mega towards Nishidai	Main Line S Limited Express Local	Kameyama towards Sanyo-Himeji
Terminus	Aboshi Line	Nishi-Shikama towards Sanyo-Aboshi
Location
- Location within Hyōgo Prefecture Location within Japan

Shikama Station (飾磨駅, Shikama-eki) is a junction passenger railway station located in the city of Himeji, Hyōgo Prefecture, Japan, operated by the private Sanyo Electric Railway.

== Lines ==
Shikama Station is served by the Sanyo Electric Railway Main Line and is 50.9 kilometers from the terminus of the line at Nishidai. It is also the terminal station for the Sanyo Railway Aboshi Line and is 5.6 kilometers from the opposing terminus of the line at Shikama.

== Station layout ==
The station consists of one ground-level bay platform serving three tracks. The Main Line trains use the outside platforms, and the Aboshi Line trains use the middle, dead-headed portion. The station entrance is located southwest of the platforms, and is connected to the platforms through a footbridge. The station is unattended.

=== Platforms ===
1	■ Main Line	for Sanyo-Himeji
2	■ Aboshi Line	for Sanyo-Aboshi
1	■ Main Line	for Akashi, Sannomiya and Osaka

== History ==
The station opened on 19 August 1923, as Shikamamachi Station (飾磨町駅) on the Sanyo Electric Railway Main Line. It was renamed Dentetsu Shikama Station (電鉄飾磨駅) on 16 January 1924. The Aboshi Line started operations on 15 October 1940. It was renamed to its present name on 7 April 1991.

A new northern entrance was opened on 27 March 2022.

== Passenger statistics ==
In fiscal 2018, the station was used by an average of 4791 passengers daily (boarding passengers only).

== Surrounding area ==
- Sanyo Electric Railway Kazuma Garage.
- Ebisu Tenmangu
- Hamanomiya Tenmangu
- Japan National Route 250

== See also ==
- List of railway stations in Japan
