= Sanyo-Aboshi Station =

Railway station in Himeji, Hyōgo Prefecture, Japan

Sanyo-Aboshi Station 山陽網干駅
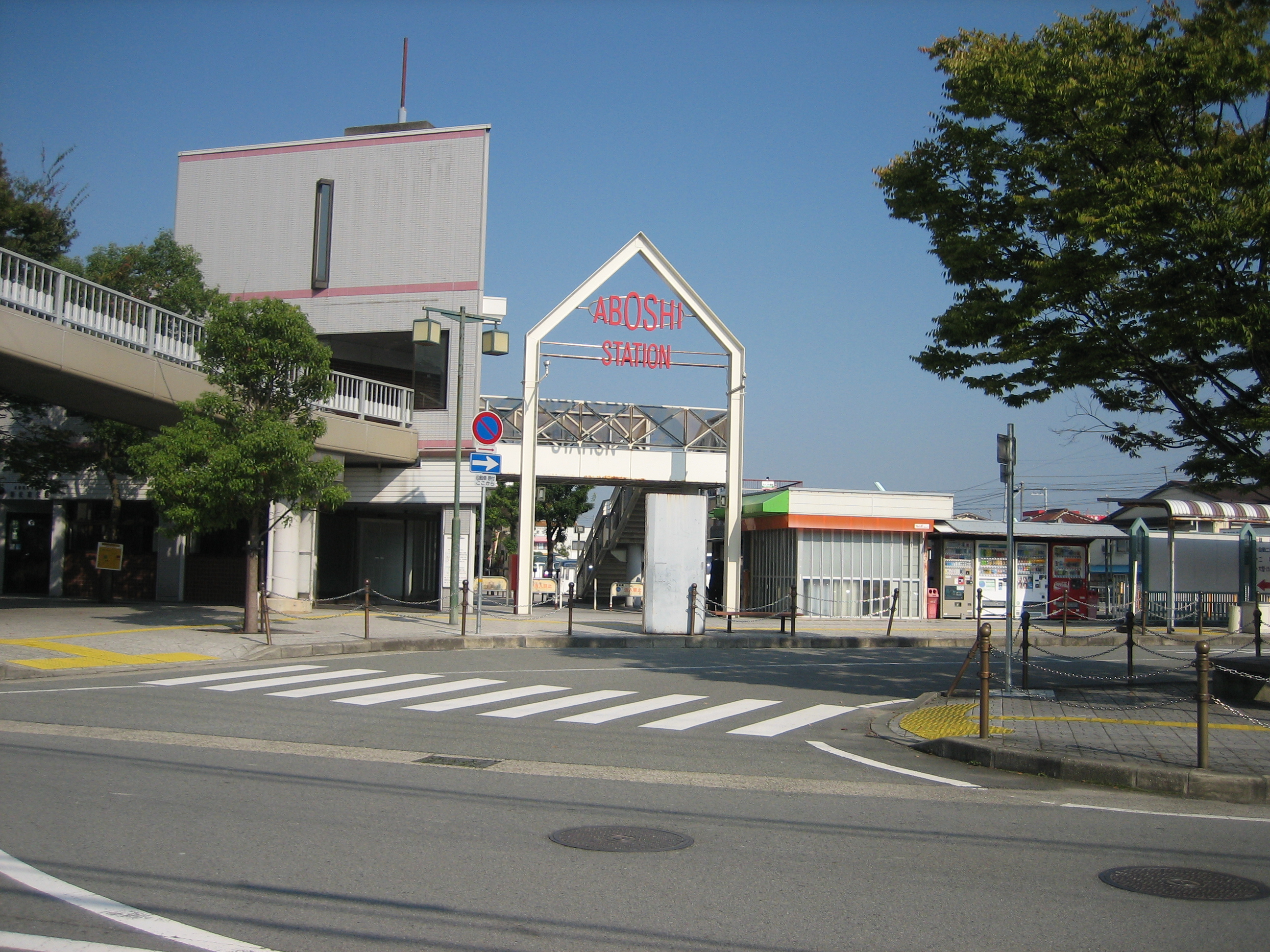
- Station entrance (October 2008)

General information
- Location: Kaichi Nakamachi Aboshiku, Himeji-shi, Hyōgo-ken 671-1253; Japan
- Coordinates: 34.7869°N 134.5880°E
- Operator: Sanyo Electric Railway
- Line: Aboshi Line
- Distance: 8.5 km from Shikama
- Platforms: 1 bay platform
- Connections

Other information
- Station code: SY56
- Website: Official website

History
- Opened: 6 July 1941

Passengers
- FY2019: 2390 (boarding only)

Services
Preceding station	Sanyo Electric Railway	Following station
Hiramatsu towards Shikama	Aboshi Line	Terminus
Location
- Location within Hyōgo Prefecture Location within Japan

Sanyo-Aboshi Station (山陽網干駅, Sanyo-Aboshi-eki) is a passenger railway station located in the city of Himeji, Hyōgo Prefecture, Japan, operated by the private Sanyo Electric Railway.

== Lines ==
Sanyo-Aboshi Station is the terminal station of the Sanyo Railway Aboshi Line and is 8.5 kilometers from the opposing terminus of the line at Shikama.

== Station layout ==
The station consists of one ground-level bay platform.

=== Platforms ===
1, 2	■ Aboshi Line	for Shikama

== History ==
Sanyo-Aboshi Station opened on July 6, 1941 as Dentetsu Aboshi Station (電鉄網干駅) approximately 100 meters to the west of its present site. It was relocated and a new station building constructed in December 1990, and was renamed on April 7, 1991.

== Passenger statistics ==
In fiscal 2018, the station was used by an average of 2390 passengers daily (boarding passengers only).

== Surrounding area ==
- Marugame Domain Aboshi Jin'ya Ruins
- Usukihachiman Shrine
- Daikakuji Temple

== See also ==
- List of railway stations in Japan
