= Sanyo Electric Railway =

Japanese railway company

Sanyo Electric Railway Co., Ltd.

- Above: Corporate seal Below: Passenger-facing logo since 2007
- Native name: 山陽電気鉄道株式会社
- Romanized name: San'yō Denki Tetsudō kabushiki gaisha
- Company type: Public KK
- Traded as: TYO: 9052 (Note: Formerly traded only in the Osaka Exchange prior to its merger with the Tokyo Stock Exchange; after the merger, the railway moved its listing to TSE.)
- Founded: 1933
- Headquarters: Kobe, Japan
- Owner: Hanshin Electric Railway Co., Ltd. (17.38%)
- Website: www.sanyo-railway.co.jp

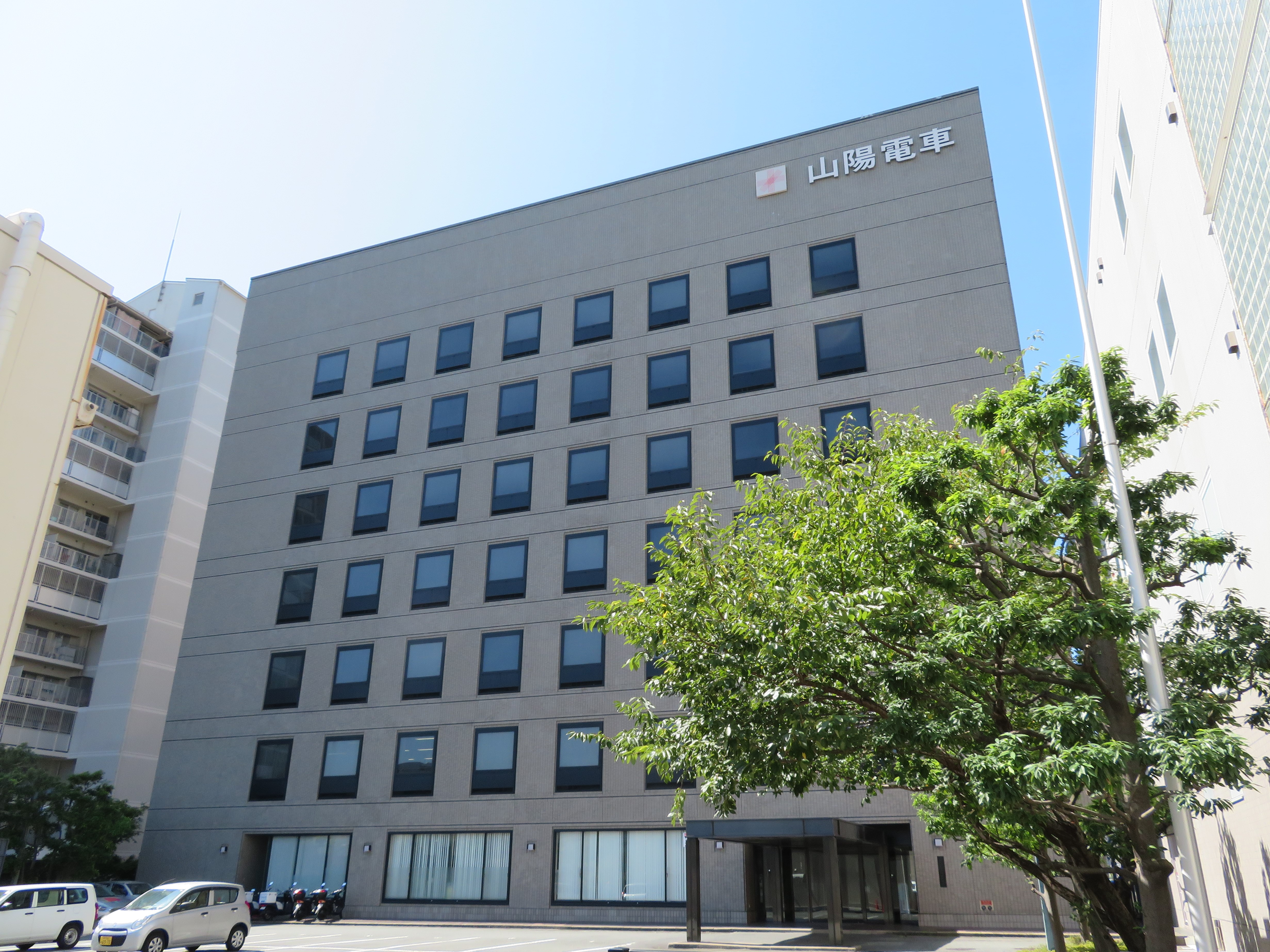
Sanyo Electric Railway headquarters in Nagata, Kobe, Hyogo

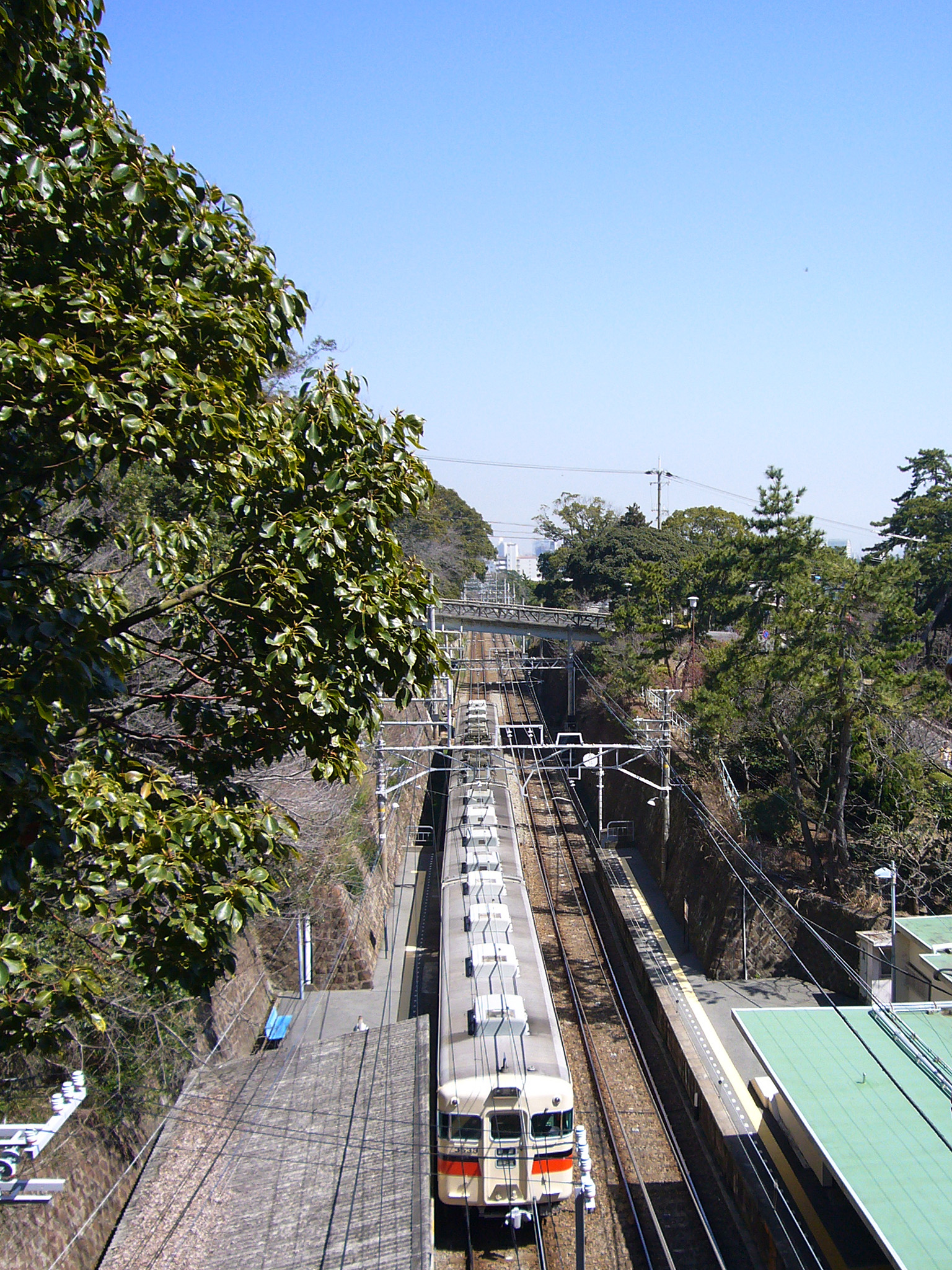
Sumaura-kōen Station

Geographic map of the Sanyo Electric Railway

The Sanyo Electric Railway Company, Ltd. (山陽電気鉄道株式会社, San'yō Denki-tetsudō kabushiki gaisha) is a Japanese private railway operating company based in western Hyōgo Prefecture. It runs local and express rail service between Himeji and Kobe, and also connects directly with Hanshin Main Line to Osaka.

Although the Hanshin Electric Railway Co. (which owns the Hanshin Main Line) is its largest shareholder, the company is not a member of the Hankyu Hanshin Toho Group.

== Train lines ==
- Main Line: Nishidai Station (Kobe) – Shikama Station – Sanyo-Himeji Station (54.7 km)
- Aboshi Line: Shikama Station – Sanyo-Aboshi Station (8.5 km)

== Rolling stock ==
As of 1 April 2014, the company owns and operates the following train types.

- 3000 series three- and four-car EMUs
- 5000 series four- and six-car EMUs
- 5030 series six-car EMUs
- 6000 series three- and four-car EMUs (since April 2016)

New three-car 6000 series EMUs were introduced on 27 April 2016.

== Buses ==
Sanyo also operates bus service in Kobe (mainly Tarumi-ku), and Akashi.

== Aerial lift ==
- Sumaura Ropeway
