= Maiko (disambiguation) =

A maiko (まいこ, マイコ) is an apprentice geisha. Maiko may also refer to:

== Places ==
- Maiko National Park, a national park in the Democratic Republic of the Congo
- Maiko Station (舞子駅), a railway station in Tarumi-ku, Kobe, Hyōgo Prefecture, Japan
- Maiko-kōen Station (舞子公園駅), a railway station in Tarumi-ku, Kobe, Hyōgo Prefecture, Japan
- Nishi-Maiko Station (西舞子駅), a railway station in Tarumi-ku, Kobe, Hyōgo Prefecture, Japan
- Ōmi-Maiko Station (近江舞子駅), a railway station in Ōtsu, Shiga, Japan
- Maiko (river), a river in the Democratic Republic of the Congo, tributary of the Congo River

== Other uses ==
- Maiko (given name)

== See also ==
- Maico 2010, a manga series
- Maiko Haaaan!!!, a Japanese comedy film released in 2007
