= Iho Station =

Railway station in Takasago, Hyōgo Prefecture, Japan

Iho Station 伊保駅
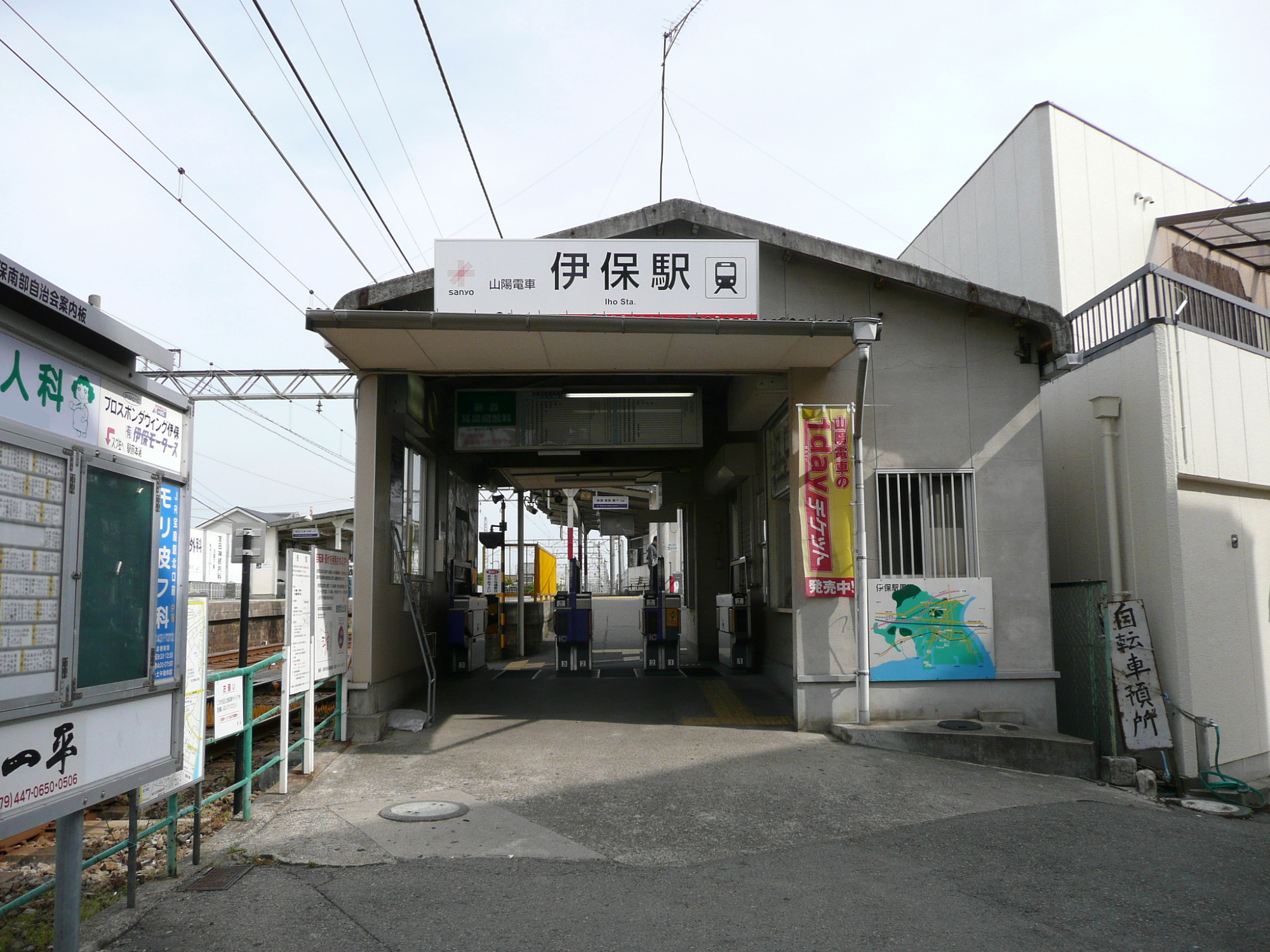
- Iho Station, May 2008

General information
- Location: 1-10-1 Ihominatomachi, Takasago-shi, Hyōgo-ken 676-0072; Japan
- Coordinates: 34.7670°N 134.7871°E
- Operator: Sanyo Electric Railway
- Line: ■ Main Line
- Distance: 39.7 km from Nishidai
- Platforms: 2 side platforms
- Connections

Other information
- Station code: SY33
- Website: Official website

History
- Opened: 19 August 1923

Passengers
- FY2019: 1474 (boarding only)
Location
- Location within Hyōgo Prefecture Location within Japan

Iho Station (伊保駅, Iho-eki) is a passenger railway station located in the city of Takasago, Hyōgo Prefecture, Japan, operated by the private Sanyo Electric Railway.

== Lines ==
Iho Station is served by the Sanyo Electric Railway Main Line and is 39.7 kilometers from the terminus of the line at Nishidai.

== Station layout ==
The station consists of two unnumbered ground-level side platforms connected by a level crossing. The station is unattended.

=== Platforms ===
station side	■ Main Line	for Shikama, Himeji and Sanyo-Aboshi
opposite side	■ Main Line	for Sanyo Akashi, Sannomiya and Osaka

== Adjacent stations ==
«	Service	»
Sanyo Electric Railway
Sanyo Electric Railway Main Line
Sanyo Limited Express: Does not stop at this station
Arai	Sanyo S Limited Express	Sanyo Sone
Arai	Sanyo Local	Sanyo Sone

== History ==
Iho Station opened on August 19, 1923. Platform extension were made in December 1968. The station building was reconstructed in 1982.

== Passenger statistics ==
In fiscal 2018, the station was used by an average of 1474 passengers daily (boarding passengers only).

== Surrounding area ==
- Takasago City Hall
- Takasago City Sports Park
- Takasago Municipal Baseball Stadium
- Takasago Municipal Athletics Stadium

== See also ==
- List of railway stations in Japan
