= Yaka Station =

Railway station in Himeji, Hyōgo Prefecture, Japan

Yaka Station 八家駅
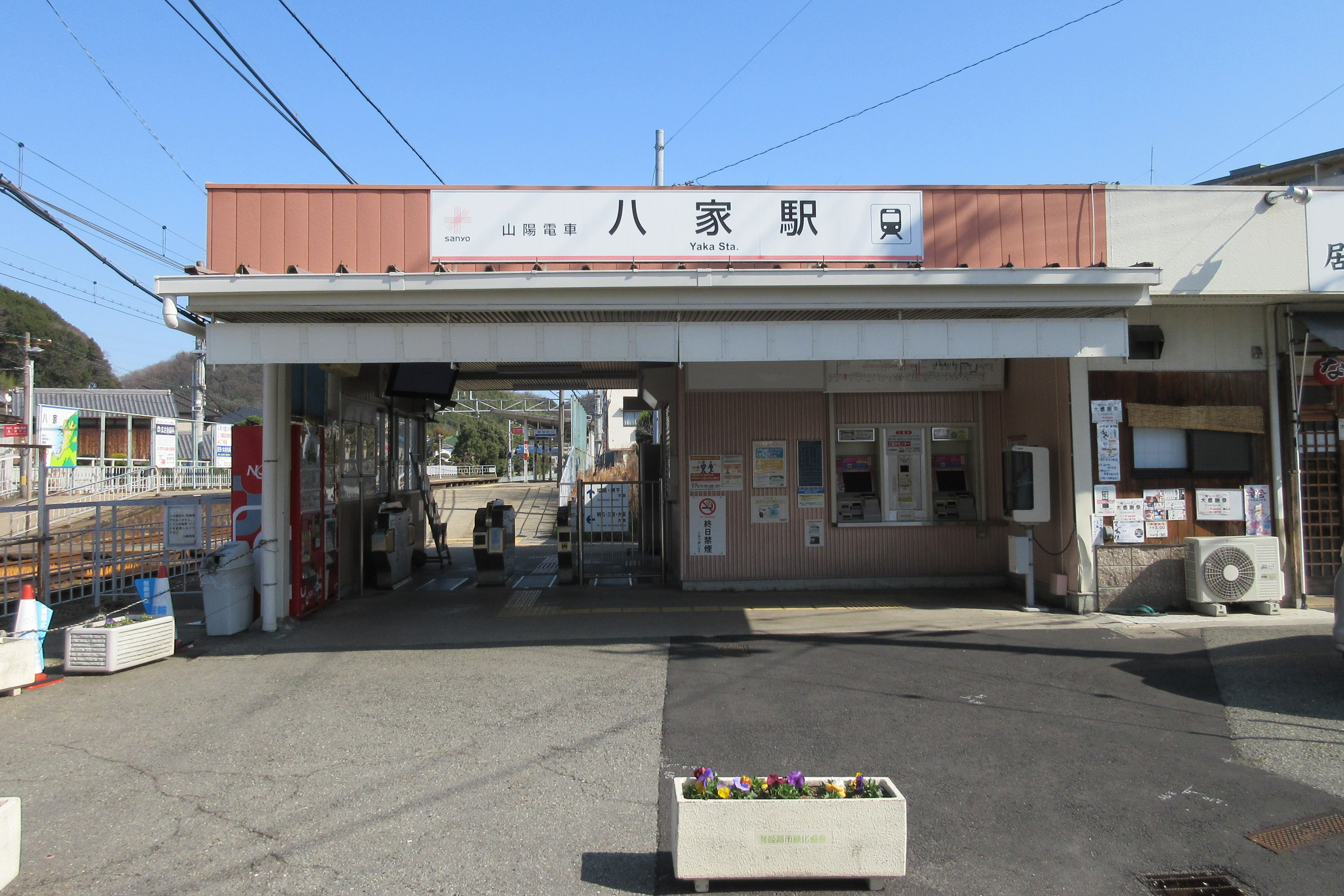
- Yaka Station, March 2018

General information
- Location: 1276 Maehama Yaka-chō, Himeji-shi, Hyōgo-ken 672-8015; Japan
- Coordinates: 34.7842°N 134.7219°E
- Operator: Sanyo Electric Railway
- Line: ■ Main Line
- Distance: 46.2 km from Nishidai
- Platforms: 2 side platforms
- Connections

Other information
- Station code: SY37
- Website: Official website

History
- Opened: 19 August 1923

Passengers
- FY2019: 1496 (boarding only)
Location
- Location within Hyōgo Prefecture Location within Japan

Yaka Station (八家駅, Yaka-eki) is a passenger railway station located in the city of Himeji, Hyōgo Prefecture, Japan, operated by the private Sanyo Electric Railway.

== Lines ==
Yaka Station is served by the Sanyo Electric Railway Main Line and is 46.2 kilometers from the terminus of the line at Nishidai.

== Station layout ==
The station consists of two unnumbered ground-level side platforms connected by a level crossing. The station is unattended.

=== Platforms ===
station side	■ Main Line	for Shikama, Himeji and Sanyo-Aboshi
opposite side	■ Main Line	for Sanyo Akashi, Sannomiya and Osaka

== Adjacent stations ==
«	Service	»
Sanyo Electric Railway
Sanyo Electric Railway Main Line
Sanyo Limited Express: Does not stop at this station
Matogata	Sanyo S Limited Express	Shirahamanomiya
Matogata	Sanyo Local	Shirahamanomiya

== History ==
Yaka Station opened on August 19, 1923.

The station building was renovated in 1982.

== Passenger statistics ==
In fiscal 2018, the station was used by an average of 1496 passengers daily (boarding passengers only).

== Surrounding area ==
- Kiba Yacht Harbor
- Shiroya Seaside Park
- Himeji City Yagi Elementary School

== See also ==
- List of railway stations in Japan
