= Sanyo-Sone Station =

Railway station in Takasago, Hyōgo Prefecture, Japan

Sanyo-Sone Station 山陽曽根駅
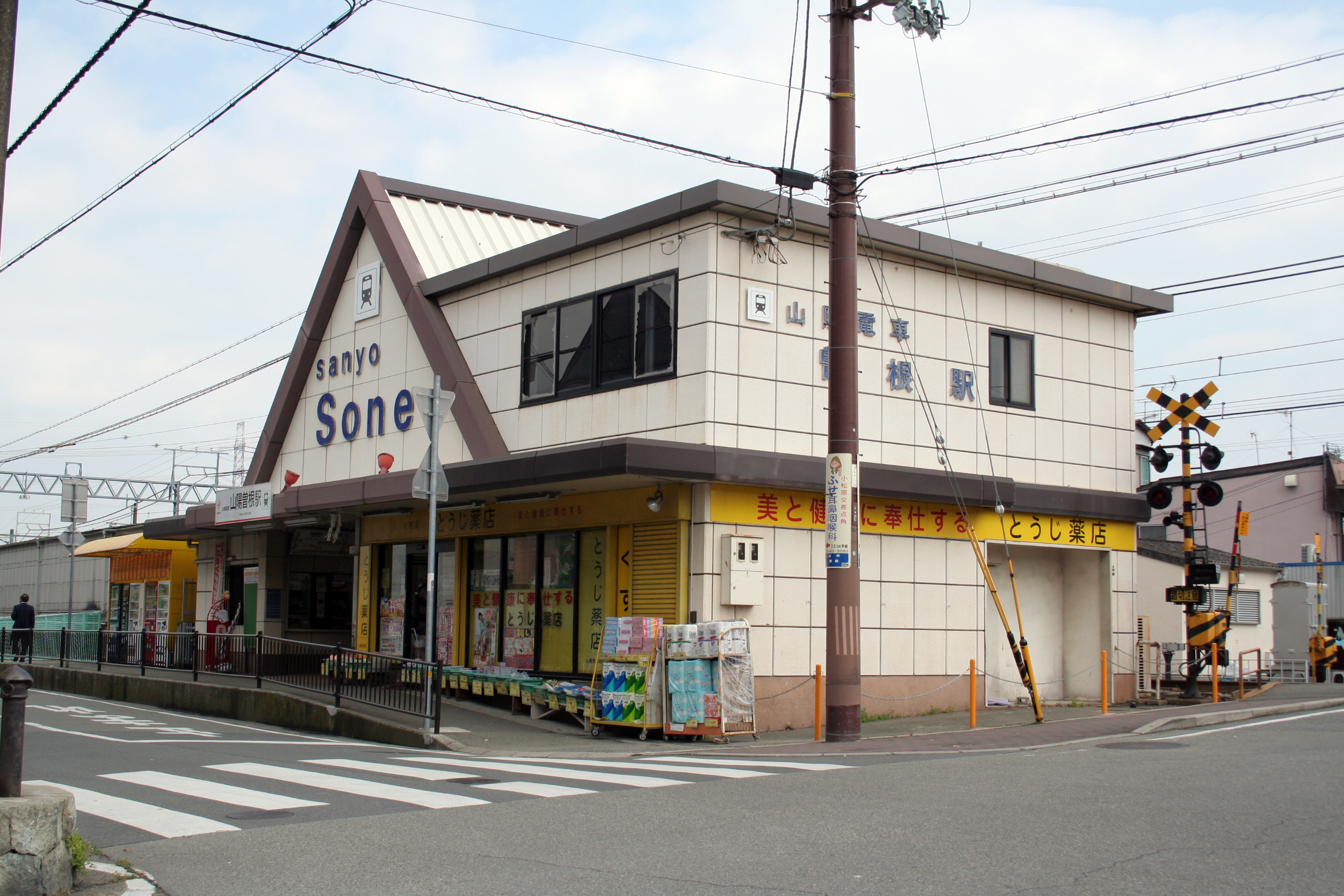
- Sanyo-Sone Station, May 2009

General information
- Location: Sone-chō, Takasago-shi, Hyōgo-ken 676-0082; Japan
- Coordinates: 34.7757°N 134.7732°E
- Operator: Sanyo Electric Railway
- Line: ■ Main Line
- Distance: 41.3 km from Nishidai
- Platforms: 2 side platforms
- Connections

Other information
- Station code: SY34
- Website: Official website

History
- Opened: 19 August 1923
- Former names: Sonecho (to 1924), Dentetsu Sone (to 1991)

Passengers
- FY2019: 1844 (boarding only)
Location
- Location within Hyōgo Prefecture Location within Japan

Sanyo-Sone Station (山陽曽根駅, Sanyō Sone-eki) is a passenger railway station located in the city of Takasago, Hyōgo Prefecture, Japan, operated by the private Sanyo Electric Railway.

== Lines ==
Sanyo-Sone Station is served by the Sanyo Electric Railway Main Line and is 41.3 kilometers from the terminus of the line at Nishidai.

== Station layout ==
The station consists of two unnumbered ground-level side platforms connected by a level crossing. The station is unattended.

=== Platforms ===
| station side | ■ Main Line | for Sanyo-Akashi, Sannomiya and Osaka |
| opposite side | ■ Main Line | for Shikama, Himeji and Sanyo-Aboshi |

== Adjacent stations ==
| « | Service | » |
Sanyo Electric Railway
Sanyo Electric Railway Main Line
Sanyo Limited Express: Does not stop at this station
| Iho | Sanyo S Limited Express | Ōshio |
| Iho | Sanyo Local | Ōshio |

== History ==
Sanyo-Sone Station opened on August 19, 1923 as Sonecho Station (曽根町駅). It was renamed Dentetsu Sone Station (電鉄曽根駅) in February 1924 and to its present name on April 7, 1991.

The station building received renovations in 1989.

== Passenger statistics ==
In fiscal 2018, the station was used by an average of 1844 passengers daily (boarding passengers only).

== Surrounding area ==
- Takasago City Sone Citizen Service Corner
- Former Irie family residence
- Takasago City Sone Elementary School

== See also ==
- List of railway stations in Japan
