= Ōkuradani Station =

Railway station in Akashi, Hyōgo Prefecture, Japan

Ōkuradani Station 大蔵谷駅
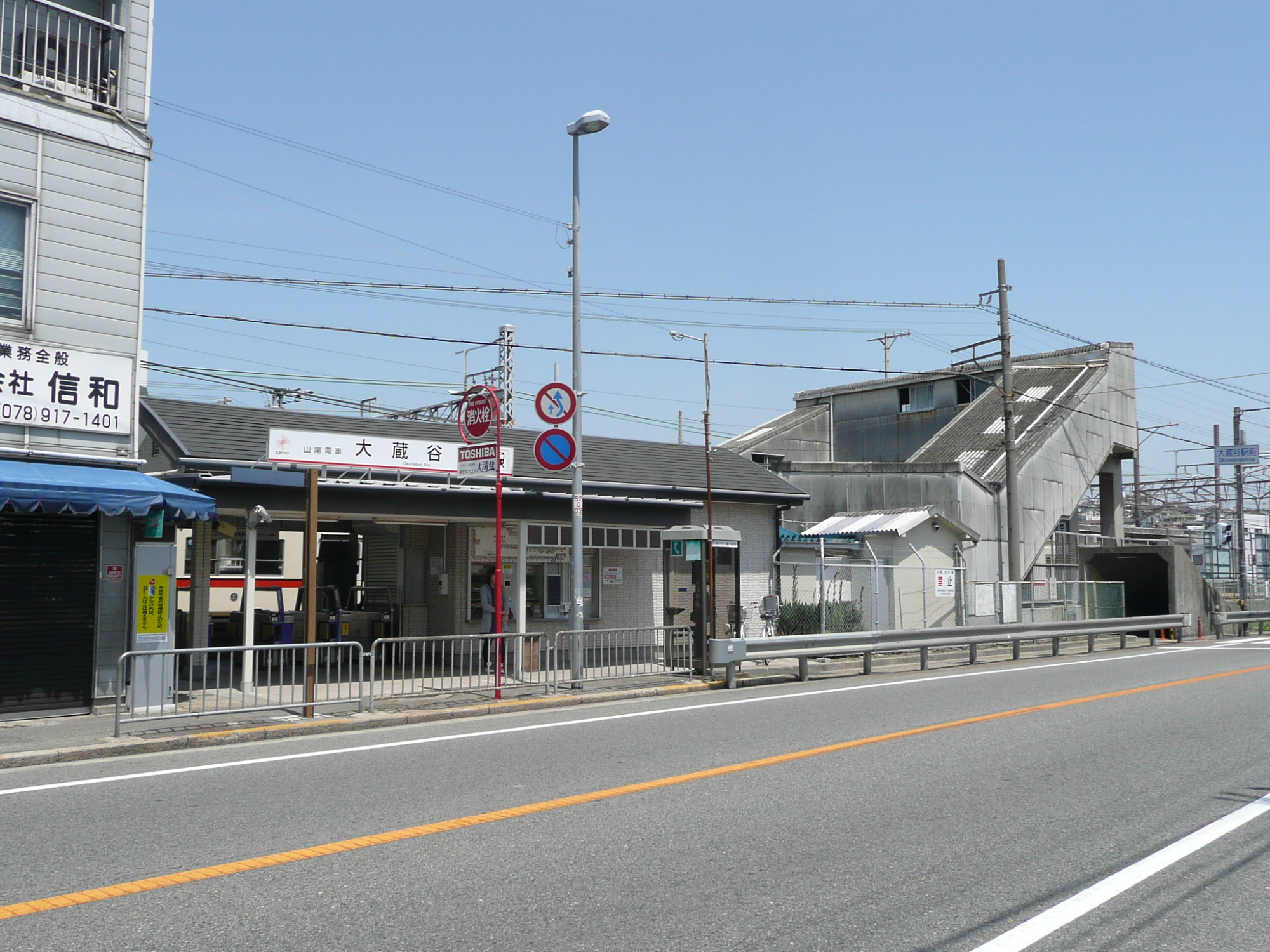
- Ōkuradani Station, May 2008

General information
- Location: 7 Ōkurahachimanchō, Akashi-shi, Hyōgo-ken 673-0871; Japan
- Coordinates: 34.6463°N 135.0085°E
- Operator: Sanyo Electric Railway
- Line: ■ Main Line
- Distance: 14.3 km from Nishidai
- Platforms: 2 side platforms
- Connections

Other information
- Station code: SY15
- Website: Official website

History
- Opened: 12 April 1917

Passengers
- FY2019: 1277 (boarding only)
Location
- Location within Hyōgo Prefecture Location within Japan

Ōkuradani Station (大蔵谷駅, Ōkuradani-eki) is a passenger railway station located in the city of Akashi, Hyōgo Prefecture, Japan, operated by the private Sanyo Electric Railway.

== Lines ==
Ōkuradani Station is served by the Sanyo Electric Railway Main Line and is 14.3 kilometers from the terminus of the line at Nishidai.

== Station layout ==
The station consists of two unnumbered ground-level opposed side platforms connected by a footbridge. The station is unattended.

=== Platforms ===
station side	■ Main Line	for Takasago, Himeji and Sanyo-Aboshi
opposite side	■ Main Line	for Kobe and Osaka

== Adjacent stations ==
«	Service	»
Sanyo Electric Railway
Sanyo Electric Railway Main Line
Nishi-Maiko	Local	Hitomarumae
Through Limited Express: Does not stop at this station
Sanyo S Limited Express: Does not stop at this station

== History ==
Ōkuradani Station opened on April 12, 1917.

== Passenger statistics ==
In fiscal 2018, the station was used by an average of 1277 passengers daily (boarding passengers only).

== Surrounding area ==
- Okura Hachiman Shrine
- Okura Beach

== See also ==
- List of railway stations in Japan
