= Arai Station (Hyōgo) =

Railway station in Hyogo Prefecture, Japan

Arai Station 荒井駅
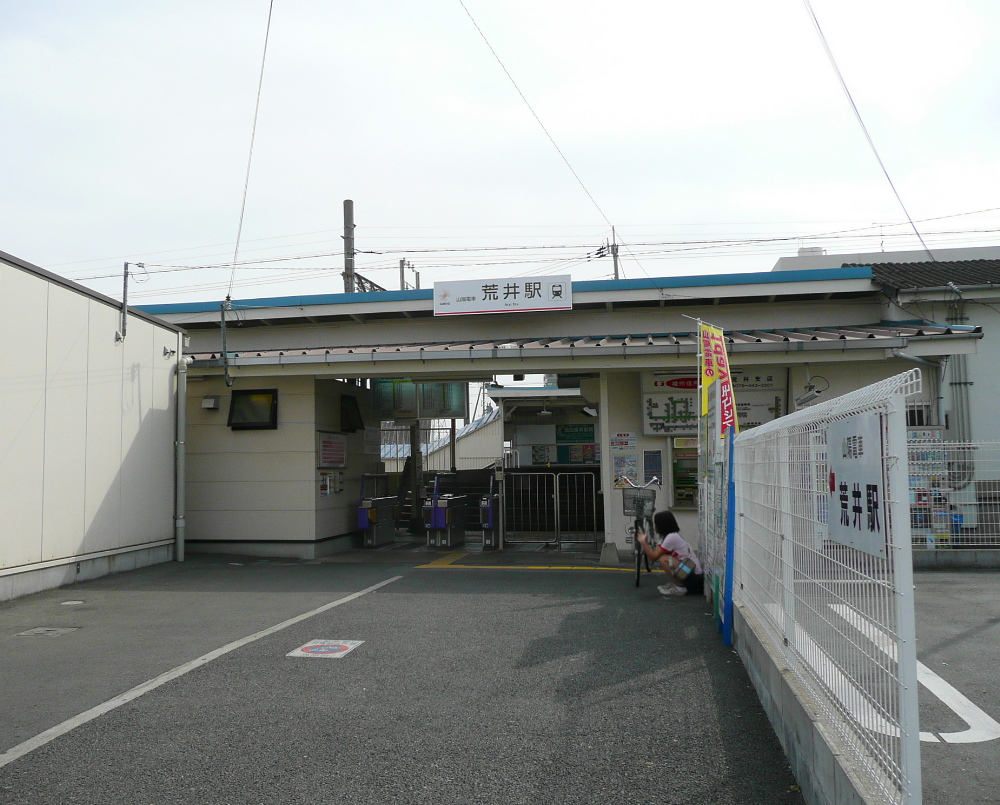
- Main entrance on the north side, May 2008

General information
- Location: 20-22 Ōgimachi, Arai-chō, Takasago-shi, Hyōgo-ken 676-0016; Japan
- Coordinates: 34.7578327°N 134.7938561°E
- Operator: Sanyo Electric Railway
- Line: ■ Main Line
- Distance: 38.5 km from Nishidai
- Platforms: 2 side platforms
- Connections

Other information
- Station code: SY32
- Website: Official website

History
- Opened: 19 August 1923

Passengers
- FY2019: 6597 (boarding only)
Location
- Location within Hyōgo Prefecture Location within Japan

Arai Station (荒井駅, Arai-eki) is a passenger railway station located in the city of Takasago, Hyōgo Prefecture, Japan, operated by the private Sanyo Electric Railway.

== Lines ==
Arai Station is served by the Sanyo Electric Railway Main Line. Located between Takasago and Iho, it is 38.5 km from the starting point of the line at Nishidai.

== Station layout ==
The station consists of two ground-level unnumbered side platforms serving two tracks. The station building is located on the north side of the station, and the platforms are connected by a footbridge. The station is unattended.

=== Platforms ===
south bound	■ Main Line	for Shikama, Himeji and Sanyo-Aboshi
north bound	■ Main Line	for Sanyo Akashi, Sannomiya and Osaka

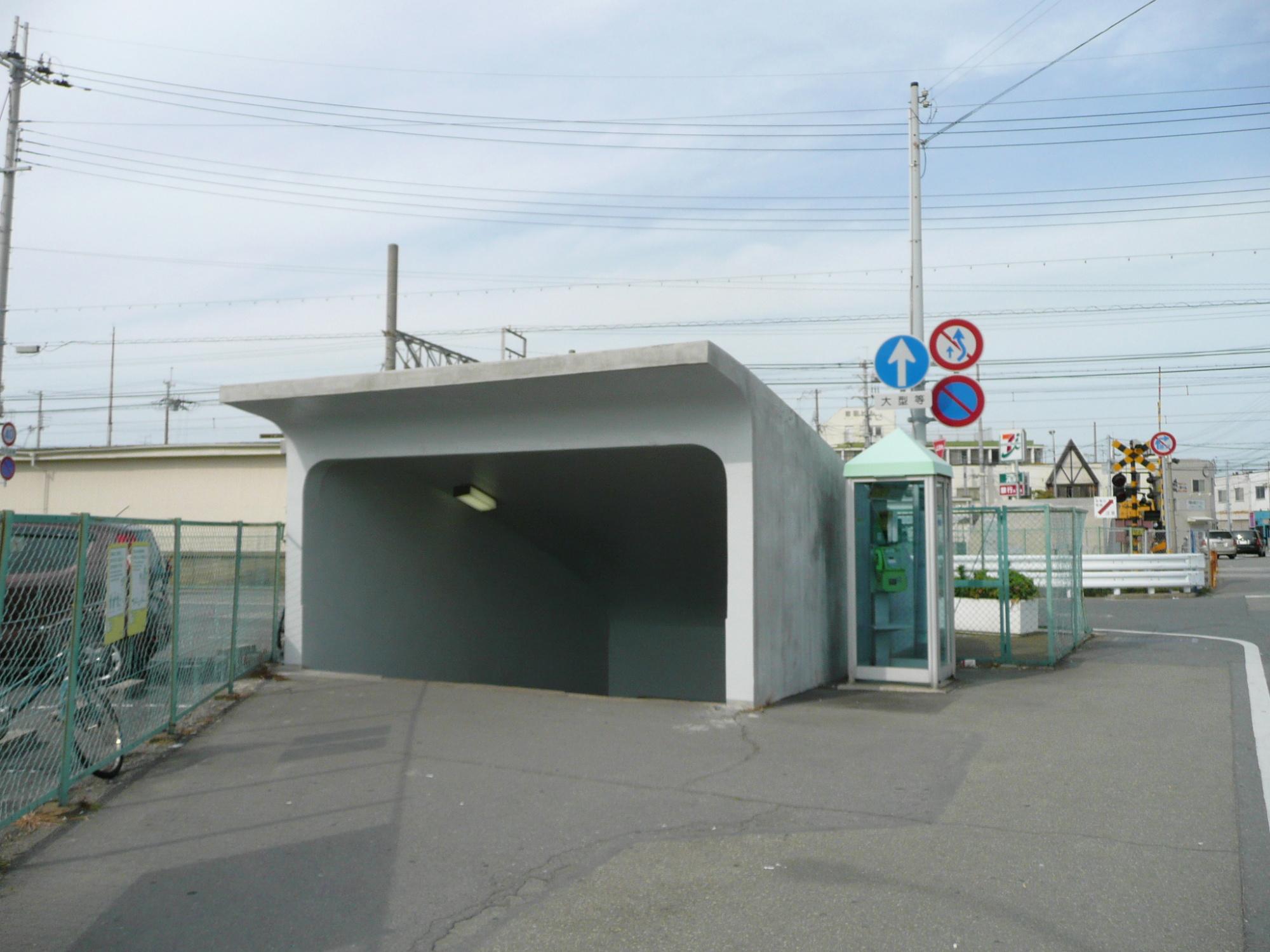
South entrance, May 2008

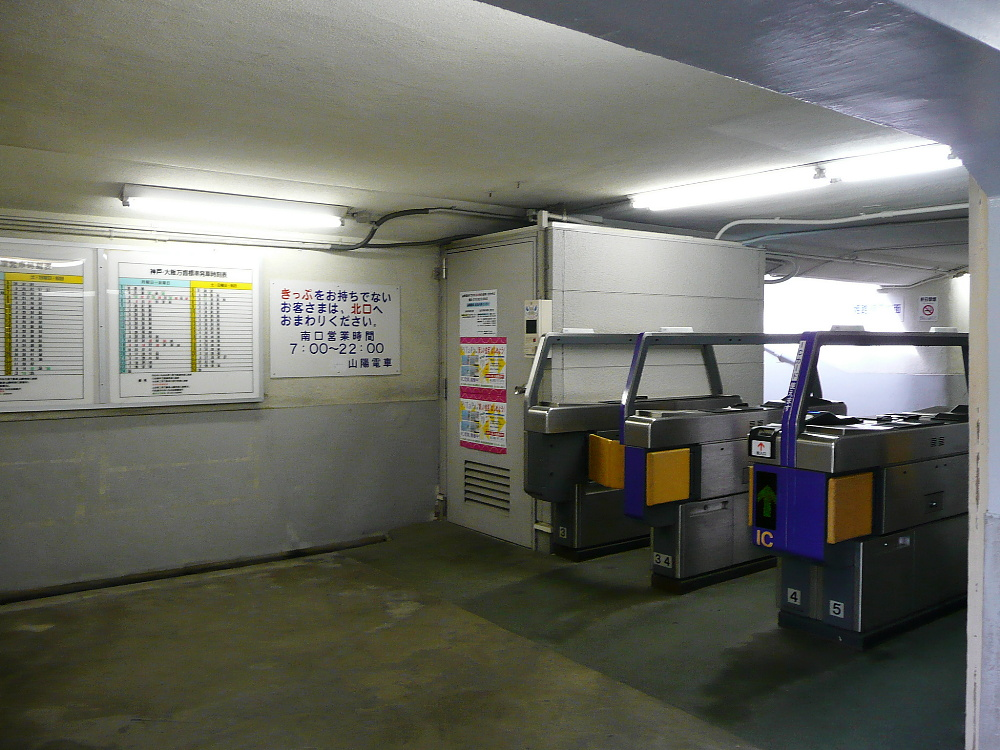
Ticket barriers, May 2008

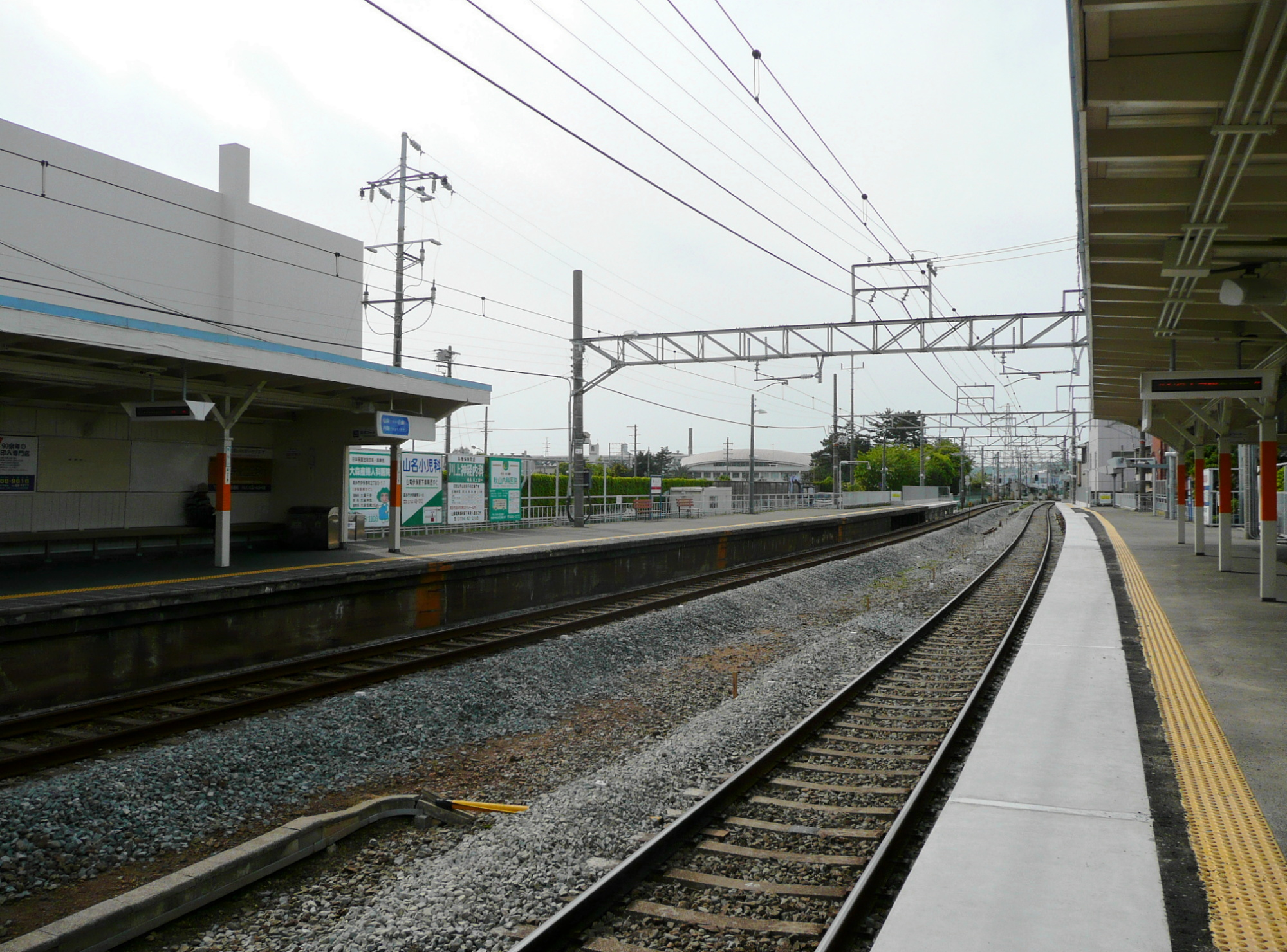
The platforms, May 2008

== Adjacent stations ==
←	Service	→
Sanyo Electric Railway Main Line
Takasago	Limited express (morning/evening)	Oshio
Takasago	S Limited express	Iho
Takasago	Local	Iho

== History ==
The station opened on 19 August 1923.

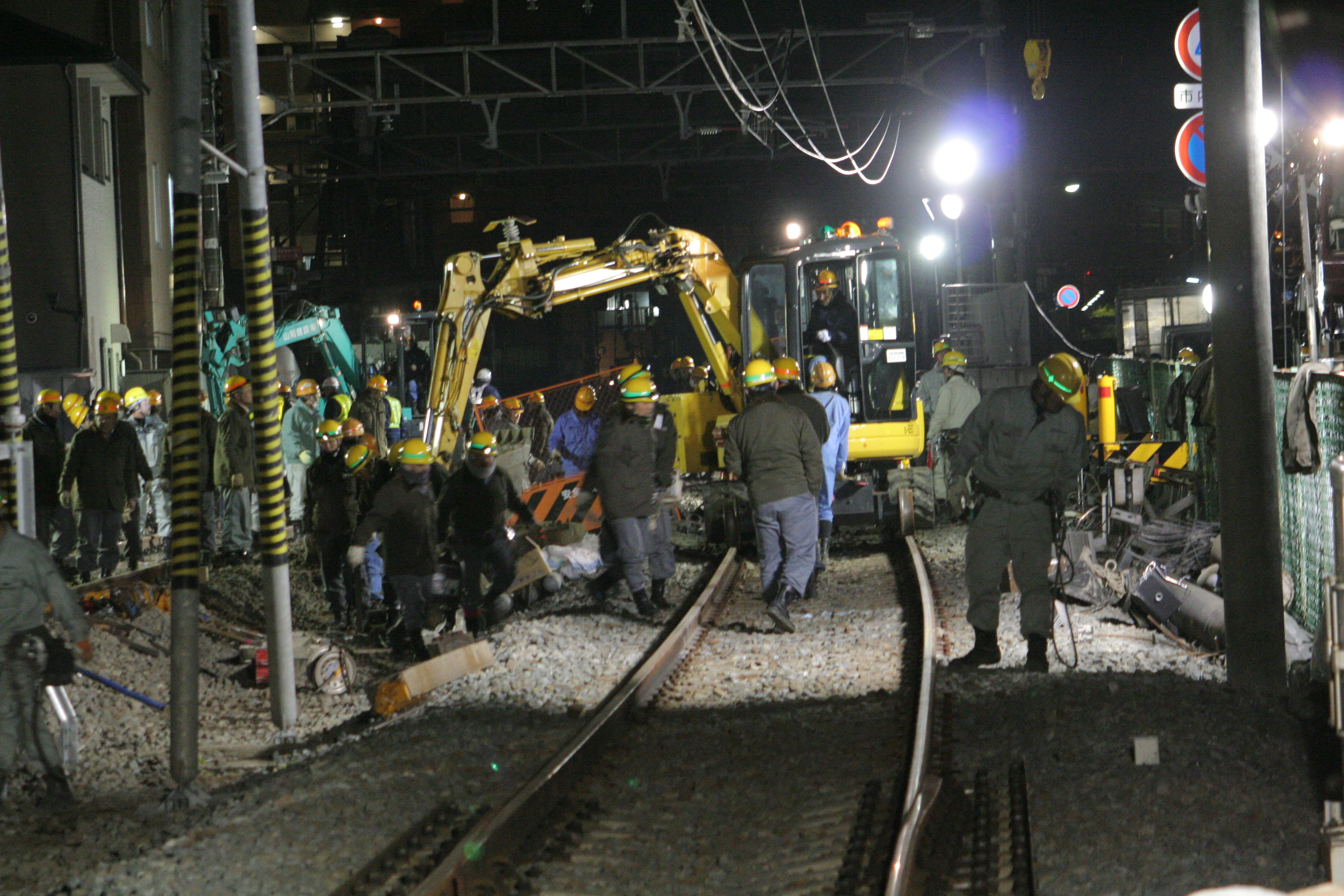
Aftermath of the derailment

=== Accidents ===
On 12 February 2013, at around 15:50, a non-stop 6-car limited express service bound for Umeda collided with the rear end of a truck which had not completely cleared the level crossing to the west of the station. The first two cars of the train derailed and slid 170 m before hitting the edge of the station platform and coming to rest. 15 people were injured in the collision, including the train driver and truck driver.

== Passenger statistics ==
In fiscal 2018, the station was used by an average of 6597 passengers daily (boarding passengers only).

== Surrounding area ==
- Kobe Steel Takasago factory
- Mitsubishi Heavy Industries Takasago factory
- Kikkoman Takasago factory
- Takasago Police Station
- Takasago Municipal Hospital
- Arai Shrine
- Takasago Minami Senior High School
- Arai Elementary School

== See also ==
- List of railway stations in Japan
