= Shirahamanomiya Station =

Railway station in Himeji, Hyōgo Prefecture, Japan

Shirahamanomiya Station 白浜の宮駅
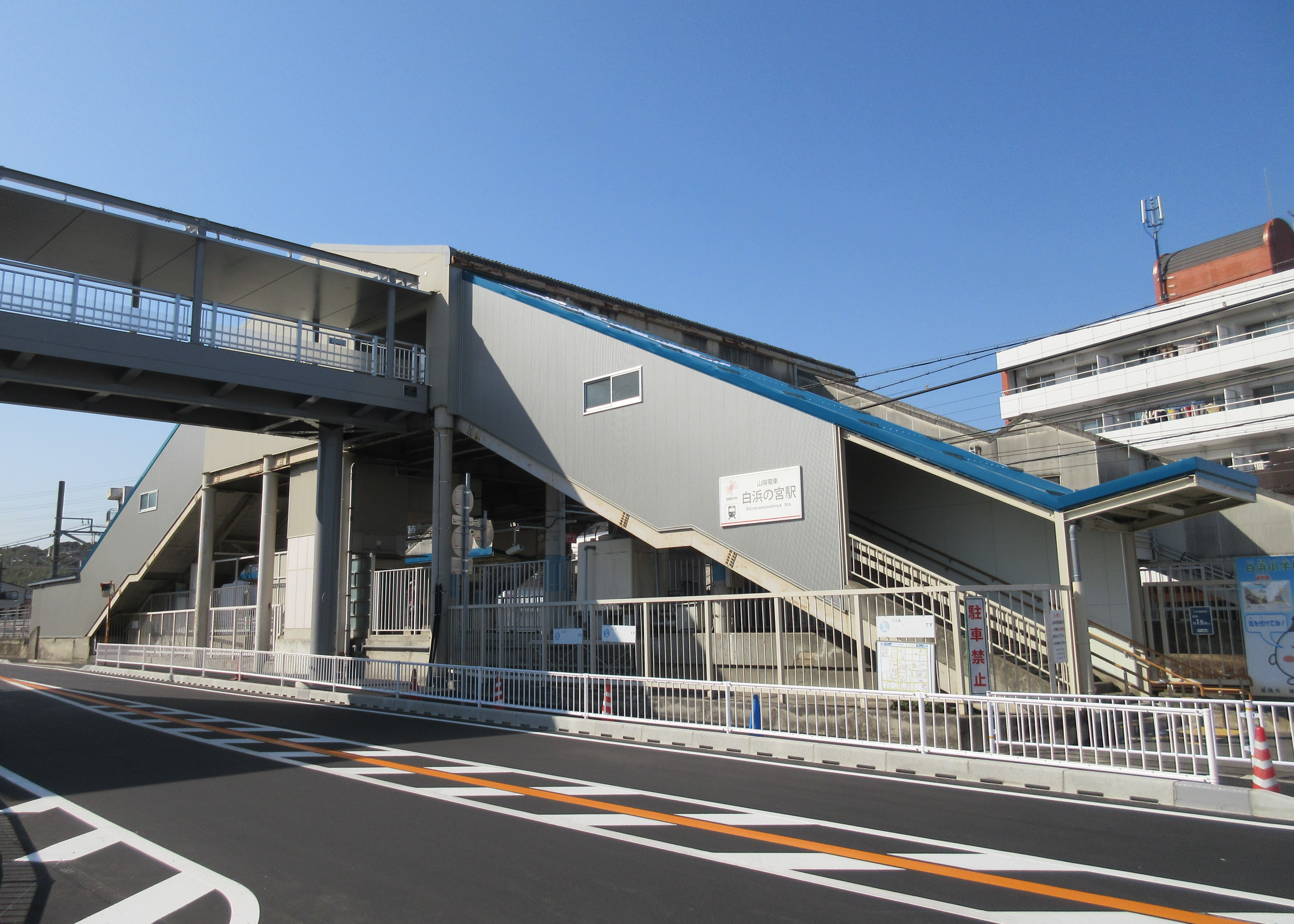
- Shirahamanomiya Station, November 2011

General information
- Location: Shirahama-chō, Himeji-shi, Hyōgo-ken 72-8023; Japan
- Coordinates: 34.7869°N 134.7071°E
- Operator: Sanyo Electric Railway
- Line: ■ Main Line
- Distance: 47.6 km from Nishidai
- Platforms: 2 side platforms
- Connections

Other information
- Station code: SY38
- Website: Official website

History
- Opened: 19 August 1923

Passengers
- FY2019: 3214 (boarding only)
Location
- Location within Hyōgo Prefecture Location within Japan

Shirahamanomiya Station (白浜の宮駅, Shirahamanomiya-eki) is a passenger railway station located in the city of Himeji, Hyōgo Prefecture, Japan, operated by the private Sanyo Electric Railway.

== Lines ==
Shirahamanomiya Station is served by the Sanyo Electric Railway Main Line and is 47.6 kilometers from the terminus of the line at Nishidai.

== Station layout ==
The station consists of two unnumbered ground-level side platforms connected by an elevated station building. The station is unattended.

=== Platforms ===
south	■ Main Line	for Shikama, Himeji and Aboshi
north	■ Main Line	for Akashi, Kobe and Osaka

== Adjacent stations ==
«	Service	»
Sanyo Electric Railway
Sanyo Electric Railway Main Line
Yaka	Local	Mega
Yaka	S Limited Express	Mega
Oshio	Limited Express (morning/evening) ("Nada Kenka Matsuri" in October)	Shikama
Sanyo Limited Express: Does not stop at this station

== History ==
Shirahamanomiya Station opened on August 19, 1923.

== Passenger statistics ==
In fiscal 2018, the station was used by an average of 3214 passengers daily (boarding passengers only).

== Bus connection ==
Shinki Bus Co., Ltd.
Shirahamanomiya (3 minutes from the station)

for Panasonic Liquid Crystal Display Co., Ltd.

Shirahama-kitanocho (8 minutes from the station)

Route 92 for Himeji Station (South Gates) / for Shirahama Kaigan and Usazaki-minami

== Surrounding area ==
The station is crowded on the days of "Nada Kenka Matsuri" at Matsubara Hachiman Shrine on 14 and 15 October yearly,

- Matsubara Hachiman Shrine
- Himeji City Hall Shirahama Branch, Himeji City Shirahama Library
- Kansai Electric Power Company, Inc. Himeji Daini Power Plant
- Osaka Gas Himeji Factory
- Panasonic Liquid Crystal Display Co., Ltd. headquarters and factory

== See also ==
- List of railway stations in Japan
