= Matogata Station =

Railway station in Himeji, Hyōgo Prefecture, Japan

Matogata Station 的形駅
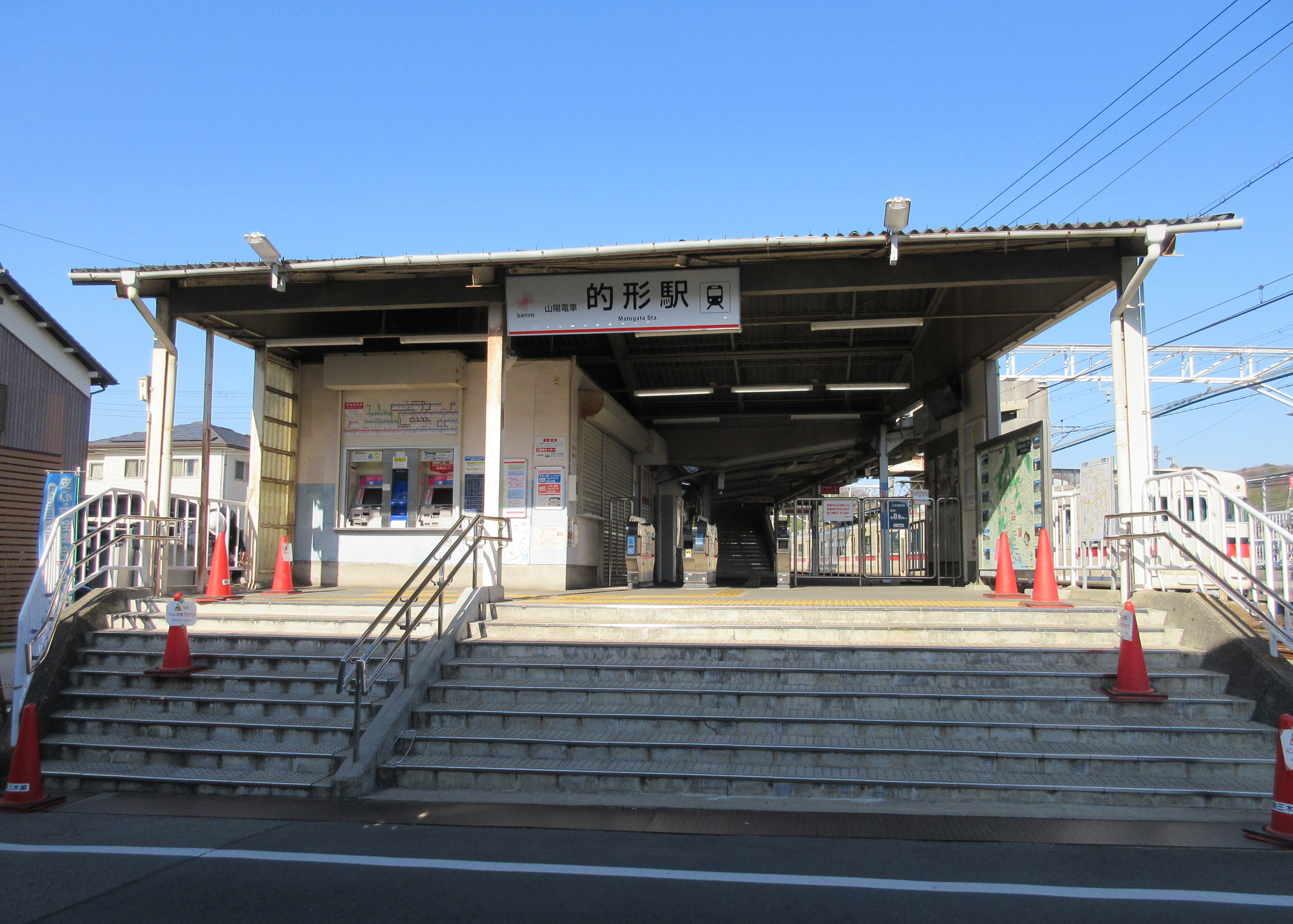
- Matogata Station, March 2020

General information
- Location: Matogata Matogata-chō, Himeji-shi, Hyōgo-ken 671-0111; Japan
- Coordinates: 34.7797°N 134.7420°E
- Operator: Sanyo Electric Railway
- Line: ■ Main Line
- Distance: 44.2 km from Nishidai
- Platforms: 2 side platforms
- Connections

Other information
- Station code: SY36
- Website: Official website

History
- Opened: 19 August 1923

Passengers
- FY2019: 1038 (boarding only)
Location
- Location within Hyōgo Prefecture Location within Japan

Matogata Station (的形駅, Matogata-eki) is a passenger railway station located in the city of Himeji, Hyōgo Prefecture, Japan, operated by the private Sanyo Electric Railway.

== Lines ==
Matogata Station is served by the Sanyo Electric Railway Main Line and is 44.2 kilometers from the terminus of the line at Nishidai.

== Station layout ==
The station consists of two unnumbered ground-level side platforms connected by a footbridge. The station is unattended.

=== Platforms ===
station side	■ Main Line	for Shikama, Himeji and Sanyo-Aboshi
opposite side	■ Main Line	for Sanyo Akashi, Sannomiya and Osaka

== Adjacent stations ==
«	Service	»
Sanyo Electric Railway
Sanyo Electric Railway Main Line
Sanyo Limited Express: Does not stop at this station
Ōshio	Sanyo S Limited Express	Yaka
Ōshio	Sanyo Local	Yaka

== History ==
Matogata Station opened on 19 August 1923.

The footbridge at the station was opened for operation in 1973.

== Passenger statistics ==
In fiscal 2018, the station was used by an average of 1038 passengers daily (boarding passengers only).

== Surrounding area ==
- Himeji City Hall Matogata Service Center
- Hachiya Jizo
- Himeji Matogata Elementary School

== See also ==
- List of railway stations in Japan
