= Kameyama Station =

Kameyama Station is the name of two train stations in Japan:

- Kameyama Station (Hyōgo)
- Kameyama Station (Mie)
