= Sanyo Electric Railway Main Line =

Railway line in Japan

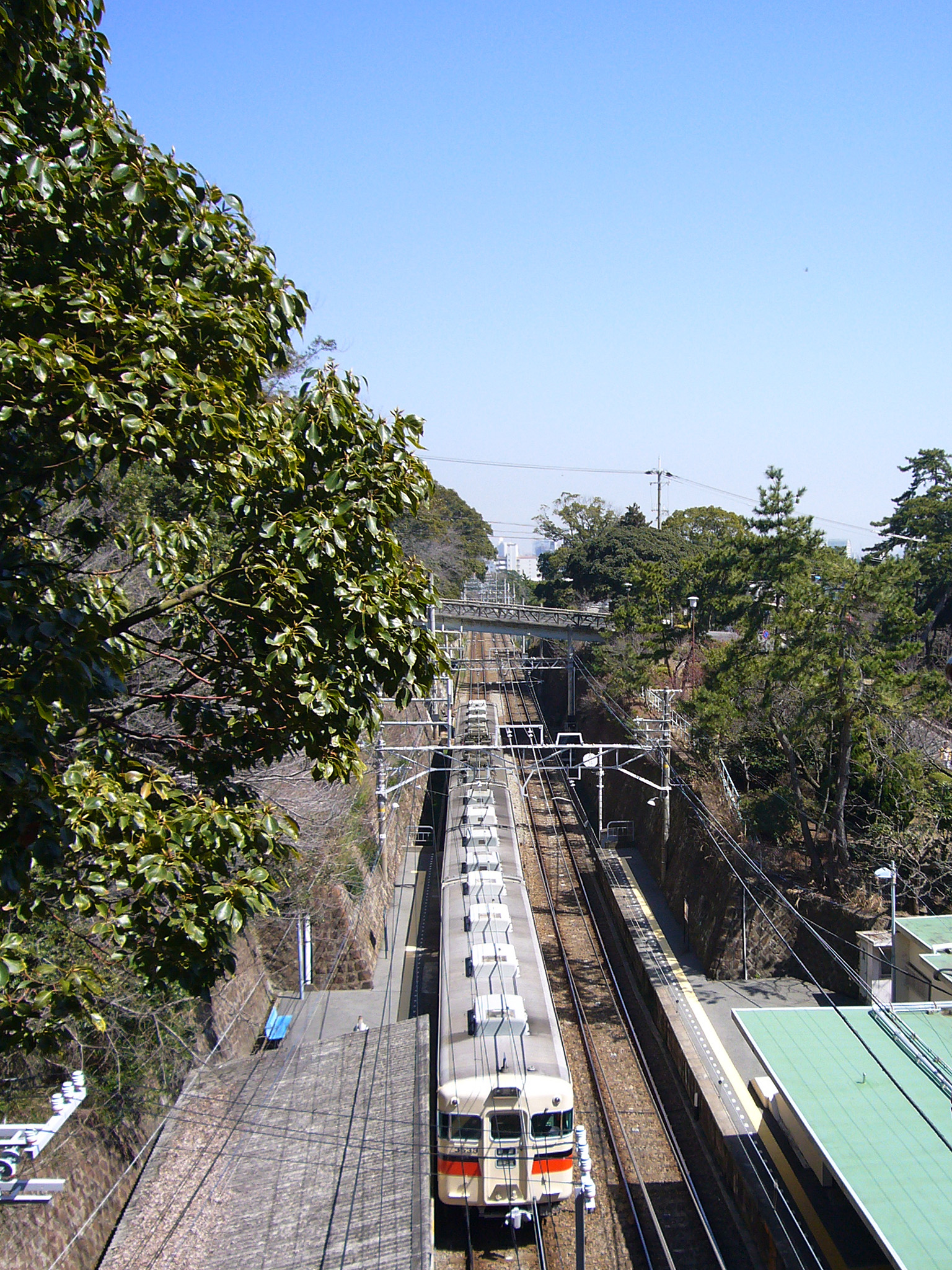
- Sumaura-koen Station, looking east

Overview
- Native name: 山陽電気鉄道本線
- Owner: Sanyo Electric Railway
- Locale: Hyogo Prefecture
- Termini: Nishidai; Sanyo-Himeji
- Stations: 43

Service
- Type: Commuter rail

History
- Opened: March 15, 1910; 115 years ago

Technical
- Line length: 54.7 km (34.0 mi)
- Number of tracks: 2
- Track gauge: 1,435 mm (4 ft 8 1/2 in)
- Minimum radius: 160 m
- Electrification: 1,500 V DC, overhead catenary
- Operating speed: 110 km/h (70 mph)

The Sanyo Electric Railway Main Line (山陽電気鉄道本線, Sanyō Denki Tetsudō Honsen) is a railway line in Japan operated by the private railway operator Sanyo Electric Railway. It stretches from Kobe west to Himeji via Akashi, Kakogawa and other municipalities in Hyōgo Prefecture. The line runs parallel to West Japan Railway Company (JR West) JR Kobe Line, with closest sections between Sanyo Suma and Sanyo Akashi stations, and competes with the JR line for its entire stretch. Despite the name, no part of the line is located in the San’yō region.

== Operation ==
While Nishidai is the nominal start of the line, all trains run beyond Nishidai station to Sannomiya station within the Kobe Rapid Railway or further within the Hanshin or Hankyū networks.

The line accepts trains of Hanshin via Kobe Rapid, down (west) to Sumaura-kōen. In the Sanyo Main Line, all Hanshin trains stop all stations on their way, though in Hanshin's Main Line some are operated as Locals and some as Limited Express.

=== Services ===
==== All day operation ====
Local (普通, Futsū)
Hankyu Sannomiya or Hanshin Sannomiya or Sanyo Suma - Sanyo Himeji, makes every stop on the Sanyo Railway Main Line and the Kobe Kosoku Line. At night, down (westbound) trains start at Kōsoku Kobe and up (eastbound) trains terminate at Shinkaichi on the Kobe Kosoku Line.

Direct Limited Express (直通特急, Chokutsū Tokkyū)
Hanshin-Umeda - Sanyo Himeji. Jointly operated by Hanshin Electric Railway and Sanyo, this train makes limited stops on both the Hanshin's Main Line and the Sanyo's Main Line. In Hanshin's official route maps the name is shorted to "Limited Express".
Hanshin Limited Express (阪神特急, Hanshin Tokkyū)
Hanshin's Limited Express trains from Umeda stop at all stations on this line to Sumaura-kōen. In Hanshin's official route maps the name is also shorted to "Limited Express".

===== Morning and night only =====
Sanyo Limited Express (山陽特急, Sanyōtokkyū)
Mainly operated between Higashi-Futami and Sanyo Himeji, there is a westbound train from Kosoku Kobe for Sanyo Himeji in the early morning. The same stops as the Hanshin-Sanyo Limited Express (HS) but does not go east beyond Kosoku kobe.
S Limited Express (S特急, S Tokkyū)
Hanshin Sannomiya - Sanyo Himeji. This service makes more stops than the Hanshin Limited Express. Operates up (eastbound) in the mornings from Shikama, Takasago or Higashi-Futami to Sanyo Suma or Hanshin Sannomiya, and down (westbound) late nights from Sannomiya to Sanyo Himeji.

== Stations ==
- Local trains stop at all stations.
- All stations are located in Hyogo Prefecture.

Legend:

- ● : All trains stop
- ▲ : Some trains stop
- ｜ : All trains pass

No.	Station	Japanese	Distance (km)	Services				Transfer	Location
No.	Station	Japanese	Distance (km)	Hanshin Ltd. Exp.	S Ltd. Exp.	Direct Ltd. Exp.	Sanyo Ltd. Exp.	Transfer	City / Town
Through services:				from Nishidai to Hanshin Kobe Kosoku Line: Local / S Limited Express for Hankyu Sannomiya or Hanshin Sannomiya; Hanshin Limited Express / Direct Limited Express for Hanshin-Umeda on Hanshin Main Line					
SY 01 HS 39	Nishidai	西代	0.0	●	●	▲		Hanshin Kobe Kosoku Line (through service)	Nagata-ku, Kōbe
SY 02	Itayado	板宿	1.0	●	●	●		Kobe Municipal Subway Seishin-Yamate Line	Suma-ku, Kōbe
SY 03	Higashi-Suma	東須磨	1.8	●	｜	｜			Suma-ku, Kōbe
SY 04	Tsukimiyama	月見山	2.6	●	●	●			Suma-ku, Kōbe
SY 05	Sumadera	須磨寺	3.3	●	｜	｜			Suma-ku, Kōbe
SY 06	Sanyo Suma	山陽須磨	3.7	●	●	●		Sanyo Main Line (JR Kobe Line) (Suma Station, JR-A68)	Suma-ku, Kōbe
SY 07	Sumaura-kōen	須磨浦公園	5.1	●	｜	｜		Sumaura Ropeway	Suma-ku, Kōbe
SY 08	Sanyo Shioya	山陽塩屋	6.8		｜	｜		Sanyo Main Line (JR Kobe Line) (Shioya Station, JR-A69)	Tarumi-ku, Kōbe
SY 09	Takinochaya	滝の茶屋	7.8		●	▲			Tarumi-ku, Kōbe
SY 10	Higashi-Tarumi	東垂水	8.6		｜	｜			Tarumi-ku, Kōbe
SY 11	Sanyo Tarumi	山陽垂水	9.6		●	●		Sanyo Main Line (JR Kobe Line) (Tarumi Station, JR-A70)	Tarumi-ku, Kōbe
SY 12	Kasumigaoka	霞ヶ丘	10.7		●	｜			Tarumi-ku, Kōbe
SY 13	Maiko-kōen	舞子公園	11.5		｜	●		Sanyo Main Line (JR Kobe Line) (Maiko Station, JR-A71)	Tarumi-ku, Kōbe
SY 14	Nishi-Maiko	西舞子	12.4		｜	｜			Tarumi-ku, Kōbe
SY 15	Ōkuradani	大蔵谷	14.3		｜	｜			Akashi
SY 16	Hitomarumae	人丸前	14.9		｜	｜			Akashi
SY 17	Sanyo Akashi	山陽明石	15.7		●	●		Sanyo Main Line (JR Kobe Line) (Akashi Station, JR-A73)	Akashi
SY 18	Nishi-Shimmachi	西新町	16.9		｜	｜			Akashi
SY 19	Hayashisaki-Matsuekaigan	林崎松江海岸	18.4		｜	｜			Akashi
SY 20	Fujie	藤江駅	20.4		●	｜			Akashi
SY 21	Nakayagi	中八木	21.8		｜	｜			Akashi
SY 22	Eigashima	江井ヶ島	23.5		｜	｜			Akashi
SY 23	Nishi-Eigashima	西江井ヶ島	24.9		｜	｜			Akashi
SY 24	Sanyo Uozumi	山陽魚住	25.6		｜	｜			Akashi
SY 25	Higashi-Futami	東二見	27.3		●	●	●		Akashi
SY 26	Nishi-Futami	西二見	28.6		●	｜	｜		Akashi
SY 27	Harimachō	播磨町	29.9		●	｜	｜		Harima, Kako District
SY 28	Befu	別府	32.2		●	●	●		Kakogawa
SY 29	Hamanomiya	浜の宮	34.1		●	｜	｜		Kakogawa
SY 30	Onoenomatsu	尾上の松	35.5		●	｜	｜		Kakogawa
SY 31	Takasago	高砂	37.3		●	●	●		Takasago
SY 32	Arai	荒井	38.5		●	▲	｜		Takasago
SY 33	Iho	伊保	39.7		●	｜	｜		Takasago
SY 34	Sanyo Sone	山陽曽根	41.3		●	｜	｜		Takasago
SY 35	Ōshio	大塩	42.8		●	●	●		Himeji
SY 36	Matogata	的形	44.2		●	｜	｜		Himeji
SY 37	Yaka	八家	46.2		●	｜	｜		Himeji
SY 38	Shirahamanomiya	白浜の宮	47.6		●	▲	｜		Himeji
SY 39	Mega	妻鹿	49.0		●	｜	｜		Himeji
SY 40	Shikama	飾磨	50.9		●	●	●	Aboshi Line	Himeji
SY 41	Kameyama	亀山	52.3		●	｜	｜		Himeji
SY 42	Tegara	手柄	53.4		●	｜	｜		Himeji
SY 43	Sanyo-Himeji	山陽姫路	54.7		●	●	●	JR West (Himeji Station): Sanyo Shinkansen; Sanyo Main Line (JR Kobe Line) (JR-A85); Bantan Line; Kishin Line	Himeji

== History ==
The Hyogo Electric Tramway (兵庫電気軌道) opened the section from the Hyogo Electric Railway Station (since closed) to Sanyo Suma on 15 March 1910 as 1,435 mm (4 ft 8 1/2 in) standard gauge, dual track electrified at 600 V DC. All subsequent extensions were electrified dual track. The line was extended to Akashi in 1917.

In 1923, the Kobe Electric Railway opened the Akashi to Himeji section, and merged with the Hyogo Electric Railway in 1927. The Sanyo Electric Railway was created in 1934.

The line voltage was increased to 1,500 V DC in 1948. In 1968, the Higashi Suma to Hyogo Electric Railway Station section was closed and the line was connected to the Hanshin Main Line, enabling through services to Umeda in Osaka.

Station numbering was introduced on Sanyo Electric Railway lines from 1 April 2014, with Main Line stations numbered SY01 to SY43.

== Accidents ==
On 12 February 2013, at around 15:50, a non-stop 6-car limited express service bound for Umeda collided with the rear end of a truck which was protruding onto a level crossing to the west of Arai Station. The first two cars of the train derailed and slid 170 m before hitting the edge of the station platform and coming to rest. 15 people were injured in the collision, including the train driver and truck driver.
