= Ōshio Station (Hyōgo) =

Railway station in Himeji, Hyōgo Prefecture, Japan

Ōshio Station 大塩駅
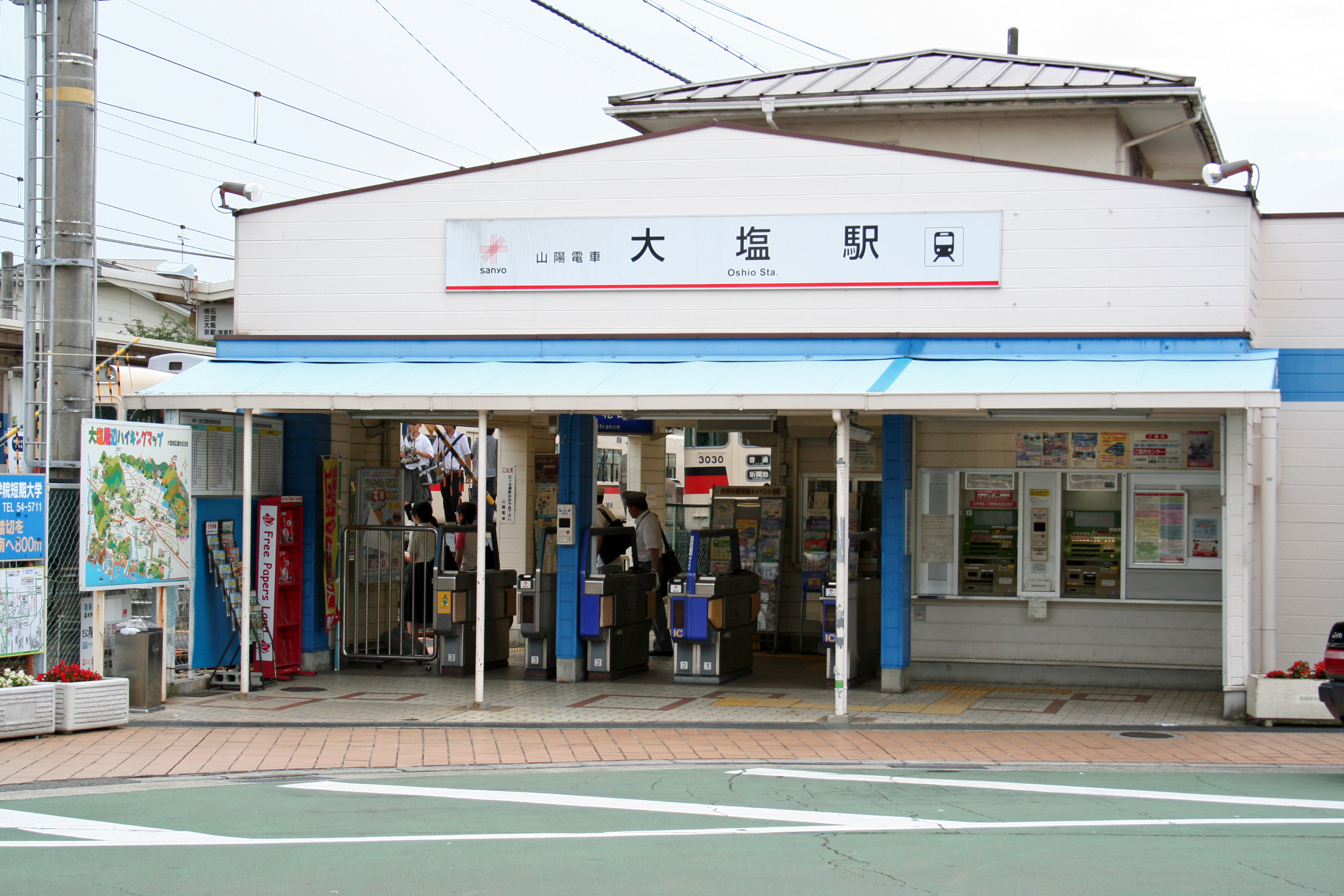
- Station entrance in 2010

General information
- Location: 2088-3 Miyamae, Ōshio-chō, Himeji-shi, Hyōgo-ken 671-0101; Japan
- Coordinates: 34.7793°N 134.7579°E
- Operator: Sanyo Electric Railway
- Line: ■ Main Line
- Distance: 42.8 km from Nishidai
- Platforms: 2 island platforms
- Connections

Other information
- Station code: SY35
- Website: Official website

History
- Opened: 19 August 1923

Passengers
- FY2019: 2628 (boarding only)

Services
Main Line
Arai (in the morning and the evening); Takasago (others)	Limited Express	Shirahamanomiya (in the morning and the evening, and on the days of "Nada Kenka Matsuri"); Shikama (others)
Sanyo Sone	S Limited Express	Matogata
Sanyo Sone	Local	Matogata
Location
- Location within Hyōgo Prefecture Location within Japan

Ōshio Station (大塩駅, Ōshio-eki) is a passenger railway station located in the city of Himeji, Hyōgo Prefecture, Japan, operated by the private Sanyo Electric Railway.

== Lines ==
Ōshio Station is served by the Sanyo Electric Railway Main Line and is 42.8 kilometers from the terminus of the line at Nishidai.

== Station layout ==
The station consists of two ground-level island platforms connected by an elevated station building.

=== Platforms ===
1, 2	■ Main Line	for Himeji and Aboshi
3, 4	■ Main Line	for Kobe Sannomiya and Osaka

== History ==
Ōshio Station opened 19 August 1923. The platform serving tracks 3 and 4 were extended to accommodate 6-car trains in March 2022. Until then, the 6-car long Limited Express trains were stopping with the last car not aligned with the platform.

== Passenger statistics ==
In fiscal 2018, the station was used by an average of 2628 passengers daily (boarding passengers only).

== Surrounding area ==
- Oshio Tenman-gu
- Higasayama Park
- Himeji City Oshio Elementary School

== See also ==
- List of railway stations in Japan
