= Hitomarumae Station =

Railway station in Akashi, Hyōgo Prefecture, Japan

Hitomarumae Station 人丸前駅
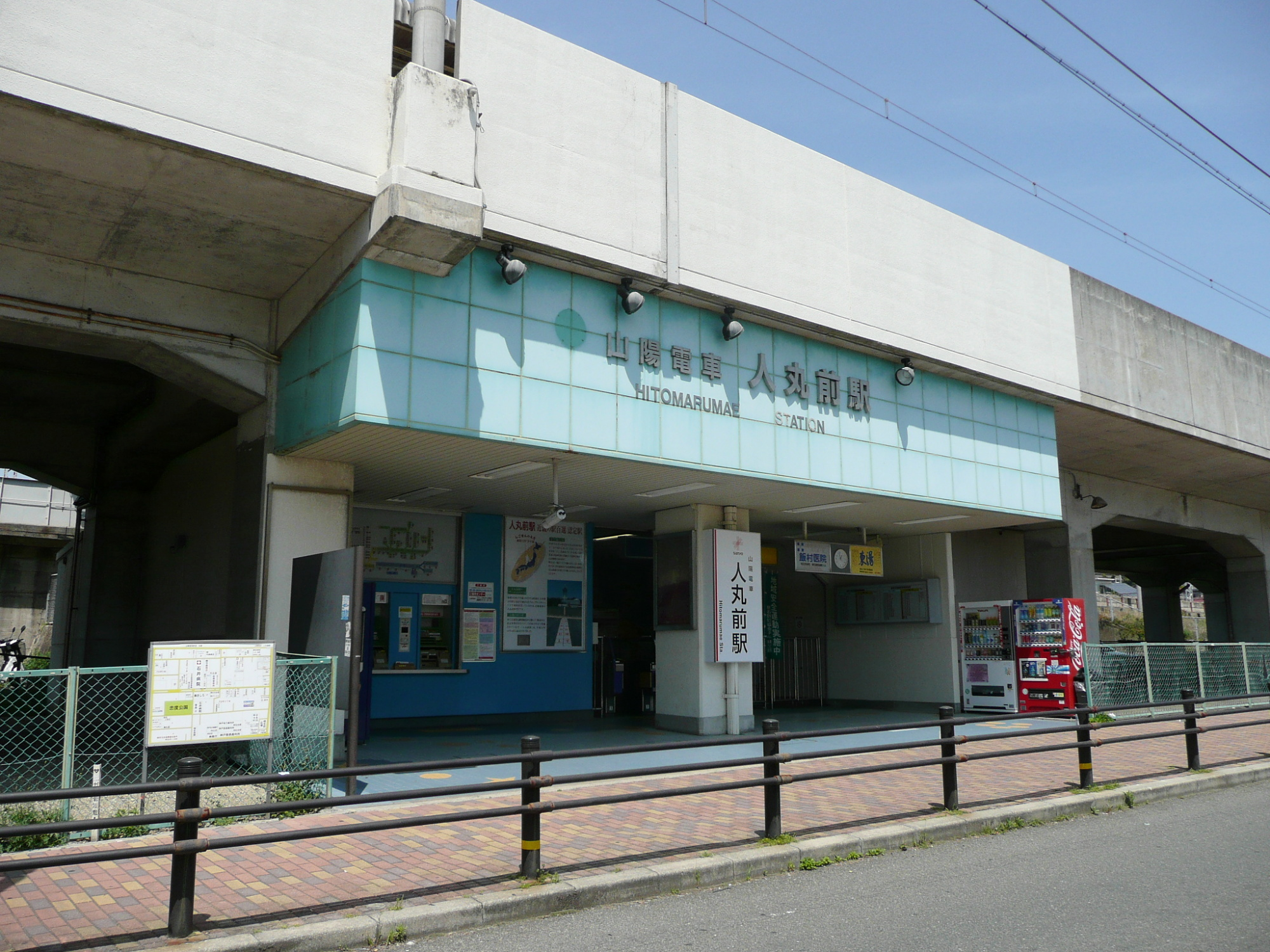
- Hitomarumae Station, May 2008

General information
- Location: 1-chōme-1 Tenmonchō, Akashi-shi, Hyōgo-ken 673-0881; Japan
- Coordinates: 34°38′51.15″N 135°0′7.42″E
- Operator: Sanyo Electric Railway
- Line: ■ Main Line
- Distance: 14.9 km from Nishidai
- Platforms: 1 island platform
- Connections

Other information
- Station code: SY16
- Website: Official website

History
- Opened: 12 April 1917

Passengers
- FY2019: 795 (boarding only)
Location
- Location within Hyōgo Prefecture Location within Japan

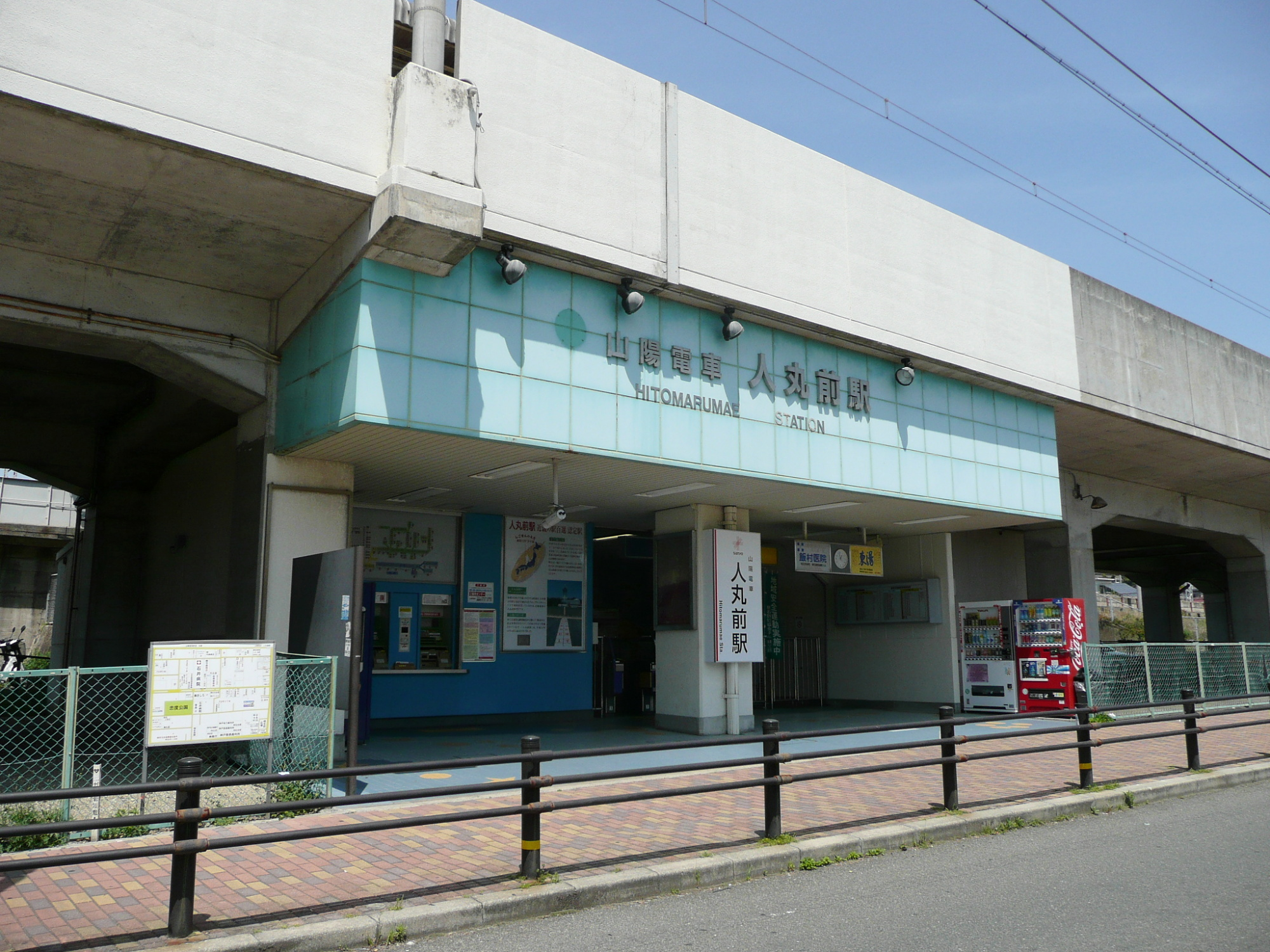
Elevated station

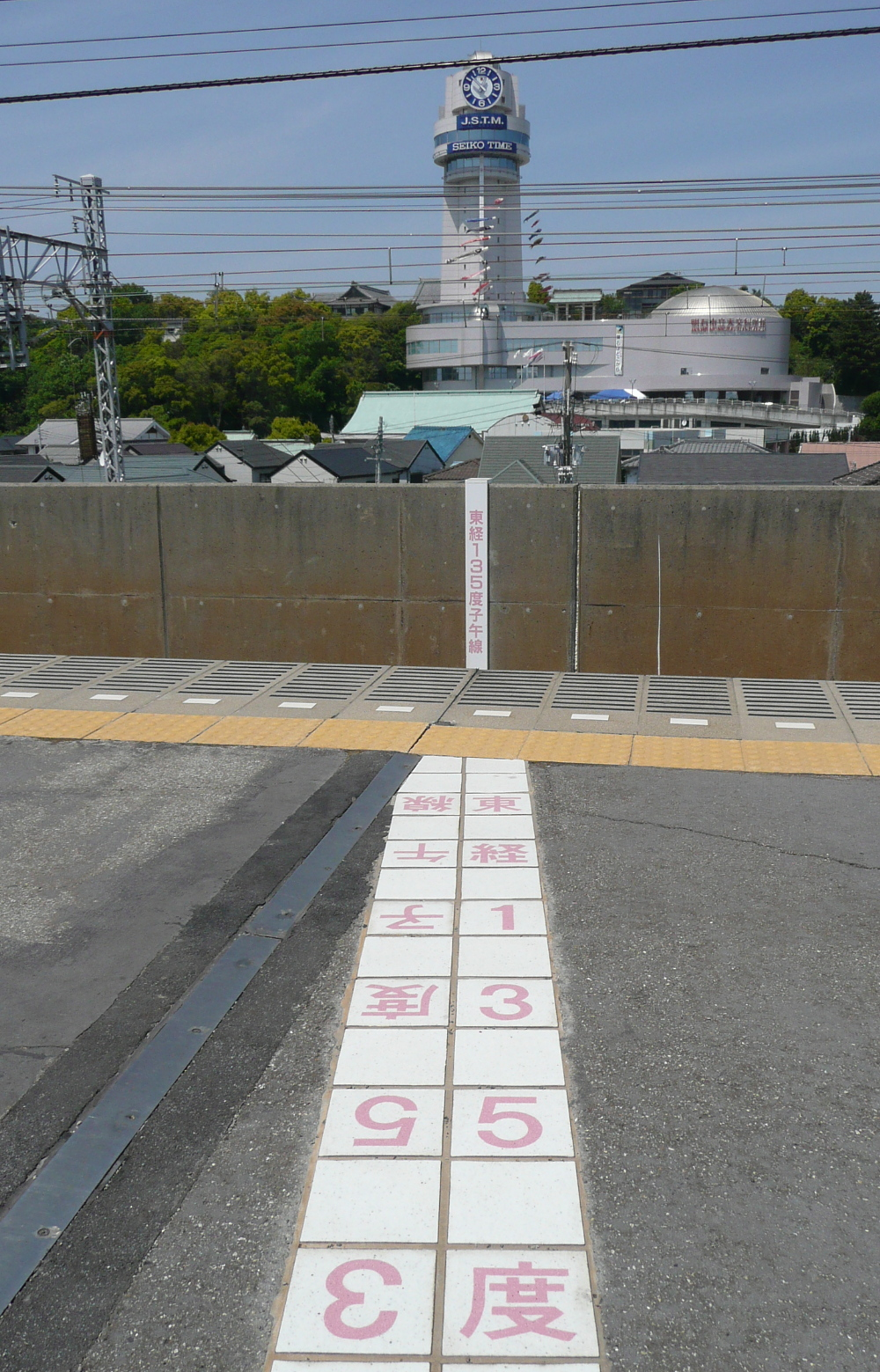
the meridian of the Japan Standard Time (135 degrees of east longitude) and Akashi Municipal Planetarium

Hitomarumae Station (人丸前駅, Hitomarumae-eki) is a passenger railway station located in the city of Akashi, Hyōgo Prefecture, Japan, operated by the private Sanyo Electric Railway. It is the only station that the meridian of the Japan Standard Time passes through.

== Lines ==
Hitomarumae Station is served by the Sanyo Electric Railway Main Line and is 14.9 kilometers from the terminus of the line at Nishidai.

== Station layout ==
The station consists of one elevated island platform with the station building underneath. The station is unattended. The JR West Sanyo Main Line tracks passes parallel to the north side of the station.

=== Platforms ===
1	■ Main Line	for Akashi, Himeji and Aboshi
2	■ Main Line	for Suma, Sannomiya and Osaka

== Adjacent stations ==
«	Service	»
Sanyo Electric Railway
Sanyo Electric Railway Main Line
Ōkuradani	Local	Sanyo Akashi
S Limited Express: Does not stop at this station
Through Limited Express: Does not stop at this station

== History ==
Hitomarumae Station opened on April 12, 1917.

== Passenger statistics ==
In fiscal 2018, the station was used by an average of 795 passengers daily (boarding passengers only).

== Surrounding area ==
- Kakinomoto Shrine (Kakinomoto no Hitomaro Yukari)
- Gesshō-ji Temple
- Akashi Municipal Planetarium
- Ryomagawa Battlefield Site (one of the places of the Genpei War)

== See also ==
- List of railway stations in Japan
