= Nishi-Maiko Station =

Railway station in Kobe, Japan

Nishi-Maiko Station 西舞子駅
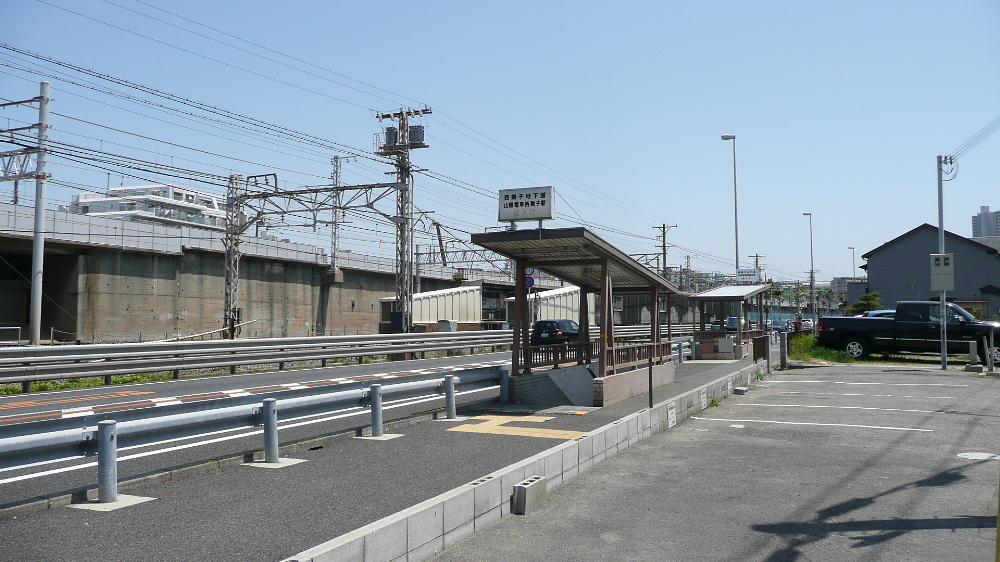
- Nishi-Maiko Station, May 2008

General information
- Location: 2-chōme-6 Nishimaiko, Tarumi-ku, Kobe-shi, Hyōgo-ken 655-0048; Japan
- Coordinates: 34.6386°N 135.0279°E
- Operator: Sanyo Electric Railway
- Line: ■ Main Line
- Distance: 12.4 km from Nishidai
- Platforms: 2 side platforms
- Connections

Other information
- Station code: SY14
- Website: Official website

History
- Opened: 12 April 1917
- Former names: Yamada (to 1935); Maiko (to 1937)

Passengers
- FY2022: 1096 (boarding only)
Location
- Location within Hyōgo Prefecture Location within Japan

Nishi-Maiko Station (西舞子駅, Nishi-Maiko-eki) is a passenger railway station located in Tarumi-ku, Kobe, Hyōgo Prefecture, Japan, operated by the private Sanyo Electric Railway.

== Lines ==
Nishi-Maiko Station is served by the Sanyo Electric Railway Main Line and is 12.4 kilometers from the terminus of the line at Nishidai.

== Station layout ==
The station consists of two unnumbered side platforms connected by an underground passage. There is no station building, and the station is unattended.

=== Platforms ===
sea side	■ Main Line	for Sanyo Akashi, Sanyo Himeji and Sanyo-Aboshi
mountain side	■ Main Line	for Sannomiya and Osaka

== Adjacent stations ==
«	Service	»
Sanyo Electric Railway
Sanyo Electric Railway Main Line
Maiko-kōen	Local	Ōkuradani
S Limited Express: Does not stop at this station
Through Limited Express: Does not stop at this station

== History ==
Nishi-Maiko Station opened on April 12, 1917 as Yamada Station (山田駅). It was renamed Maiko Station (舞子駅) on August 1, 1935, and renamed to its present name in 1937

== Passenger statistics ==
In fiscal 2018, the station was used by an average of 1044 passengers daily (boarding passengers only).

== Surrounding area ==
- Otoshiyama Archaeological Park
- Kitsunezuka Kofun
- Maiko Hosomichi Park

== See also ==
- List of railway stations in Japan
