= Kameyama Station (Hyōgo) =

Railway station in Himeji, Hyogo prefecture, Japan

Kameyama Station 亀山駅
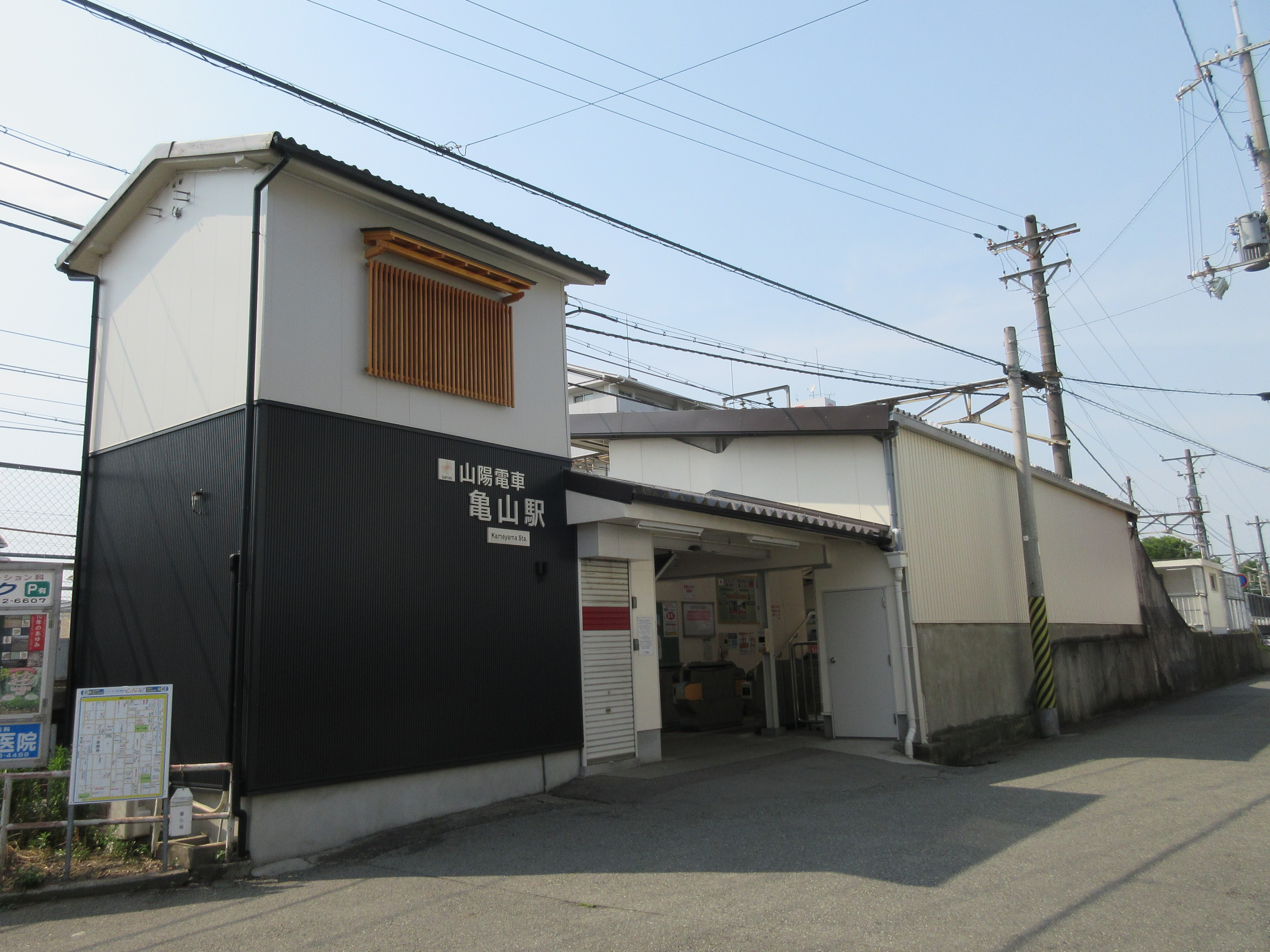
- Kameyama Station, June 2017

General information
- Location: Kameyama, Himeji-shi, Hyōgo-ken 670-0973; Japan
- Coordinates: 34°48′39″N 134°40′37″E
- Operator: Sanyo Electric Railway
- Line: ■ Main Line
- Distance: 52.3 km from Nishidai
- Platforms: 2 side platforms
- Connections

Other information
- Station code: SY41
- Website: Official website

History
- Opened: 19 August 1923
- Former names: Kameyama-gobo (to 1944); Dentetsu Kameyama (to 1991)

Passengers
- FY2019: 1276 (boarding only)
Location
- Location within Hyōgo Prefecture Location within Japan

Kameyama Station (亀山駅, Kameyama-eki) is a passenger railway station located in the city of Himeji, Hyōgo Prefecture, Japan, operated by the private Sanyo Electric Railway.

== Lines ==
Kameyama Station is served by the Sanyo Electric Railway Main Line and is 52.3 kilometers from the terminus of the line at Nishidai.

== Station layout ==
The station consists of two unnumbered ground-level side platforms connected by a level crossing. The station is unattended.

=== Platforms ===
station side	■ Main Line	for Shikama, Himeji and Sanyo-Aboshi
opposite side	■ Main Line	for Akashi, Kobe and Osaka

== Adjacent stations ==
«	Service	»
Sanyo Electric Railway
Sanyo Electric Railway Main Line
Shikama	Local	Tegara
Shikama	S Limited Express (running only from Hanshin Sannomiya for Himeji)	Tegara
Limited Express: Does not stop at this station

== History ==
Kameyama Station opened on 19 August 1923 as Kameyama-gobo Station (亀山御坊駅). It was renamed Dentetsu Kameyama Station (電鉄亀山駅) on 1 April 1944 and renamed its present name on 7 April 1991.

== Passenger statistics ==
In fiscal 2018, the station was used by an average of 1276 passengers daily (boarding passengers only).

== Surrounding area ==
- Kameyama Hontokuji Temple (Kameyama Gobo)
- Japan National Route 2
- Himeji Central Hospital

== See also ==
- List of railway stations in Japan
