= Takasago Station (Hyōgo) =

Railway station in Takasago, Hyōgo Prefecture, Japan

Takasago Station 高砂駅
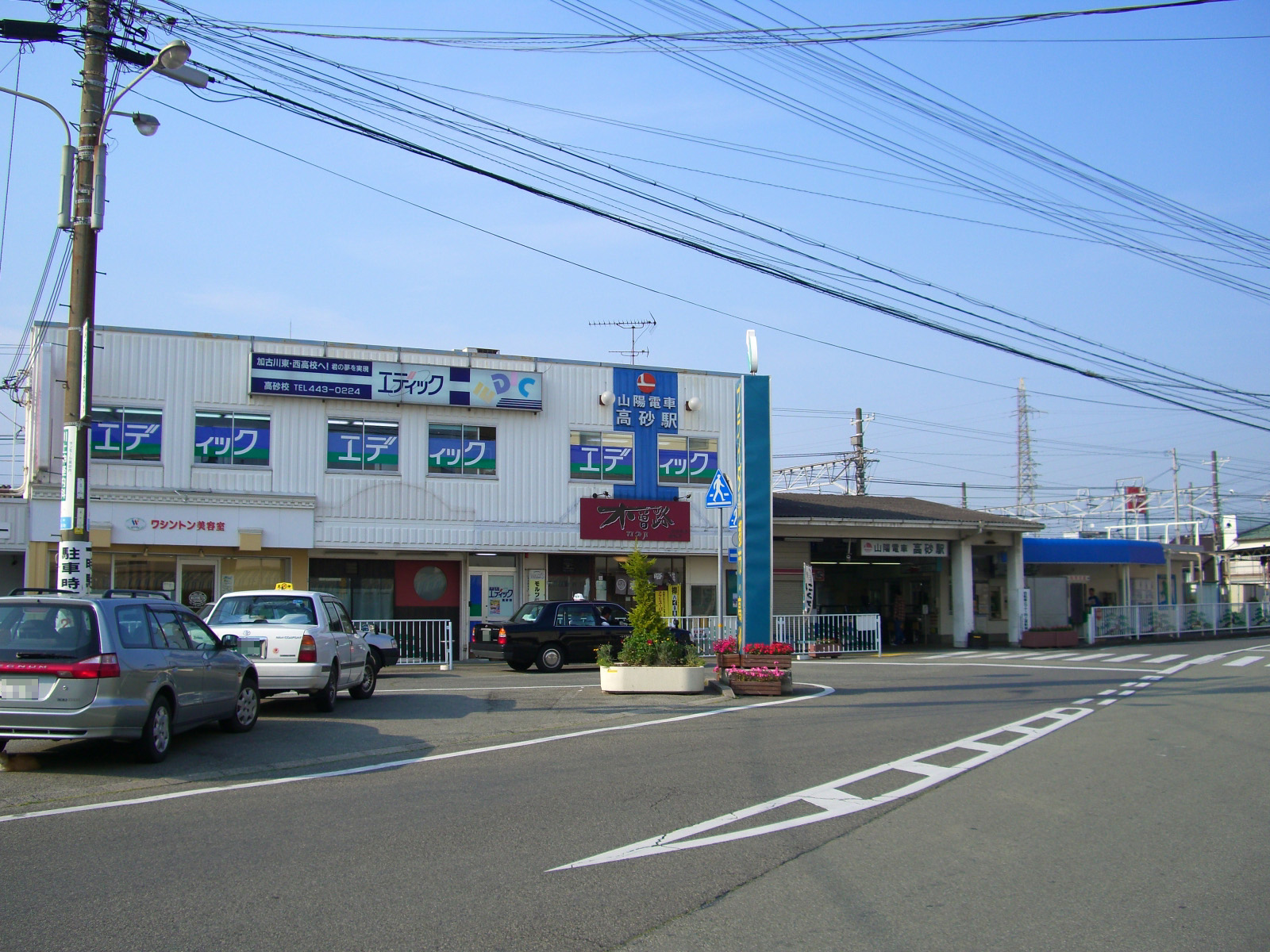
- Takasago Station, May 2007

General information
- Location: Hamadamachi, Takasago-chō, Takasago-shi, Hyōgo-ken 676-0022; Japan
- Coordinates: 34.7518387°N 134.8032546°E
- Operator: Sanyo Electric Railway
- Line: ■ Main Line
- Distance: 37.3 km from Nishidai
- Platforms: 2 island platforms
- Connections

Other information
- Station code: SY31
- Website: Official website

History
- Opened: 19 August 1923
- Former names: Takasagomachi (to 1924), Dentetsu Takasago (to 1991)

Passengers
- FY2019: 1844 (boarding only)
Location
- Location within Hyōgo Prefecture Location within Japan

Takasago Station (高砂駅, Takasago-eki) is a passenger railway station located in the city of Takasago, Hyōgo Prefecture, Japan, operated by the private Sanyo Electric Railway.

== Lines ==
Takasago Station is served by the Sanyo Electric Railway Main Line and is 37.3 kilometers from the terminus of the line at Nishidai.

== Station layout ==
The station consists of two island platforms connected by an underground passage.

=== Platforms ===
1, 2	■ Main Line	for Shikama, Himeji and Sanyo-Aboshi
3, 4	■ Main Line	for Sanyo Akashi, Sannomiya and Osaka

== Adjacent stations ==
«	Service	»
Sanyo Electric Railway
Sanyo Electric Railway Main Line
Befu	Limited Express	Arai (in the morning and the evening); Ōshio (others)
Onoenomatsu	S Limited Express	Arai
Onoenomatsu	Local	Arai

== History ==
Takasago Station opened on August 19, 1923, as Takasagomachi Station (高砂町駅). It was renamed Dentetsu Sone Station (電鉄高砂駅) in February 1924 and to its present name on April 7, 1991.

== Passenger statistics ==
In fiscal 2018, the station was used by an average of 3241 passengers daily (boarding passengers only).

== Surrounding area ==
- Umegaedayu
- Takasago Chamber of Commerce and Industry
- Mitsubishi Paper Mills Takasago Factory

== See also ==
- List of railway stations in Japan
