= Takasago, Hyōgo =

Takasago 高砂市
- City
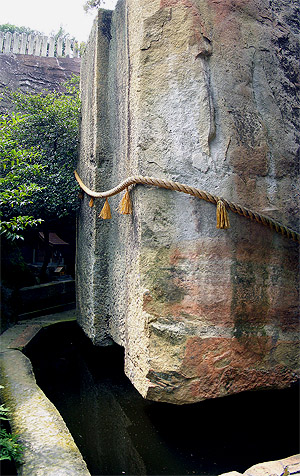
- Ishi no Hōden, National Historic Site

- Flag Seal

- Location of Takasago in Hyōgo Prefecture

- Location in Japan
- Coordinates: 34°46′N 134°47′E
- Country: Japan
- Region: Kansai
- Prefecture: Hyōgo

Government
  - Mayor: Yukihito Nobori

Area
  - Total: 34.38 km^{2} (13.27 sq mi)

Population (August 4, 2025)
  - Total: 86,030
  - Density: 2,502/km^{2} (6,481/sq mi)
- Time zone: UTC+09:00 (JST)
- City hall address: 1-1-1, Araichō Chidori, Takasago-shi, Hyōgo-ken 676-8501
- Website: Official website
- Symbols
- Flower: Chrysanthemum
- Tree: Pine

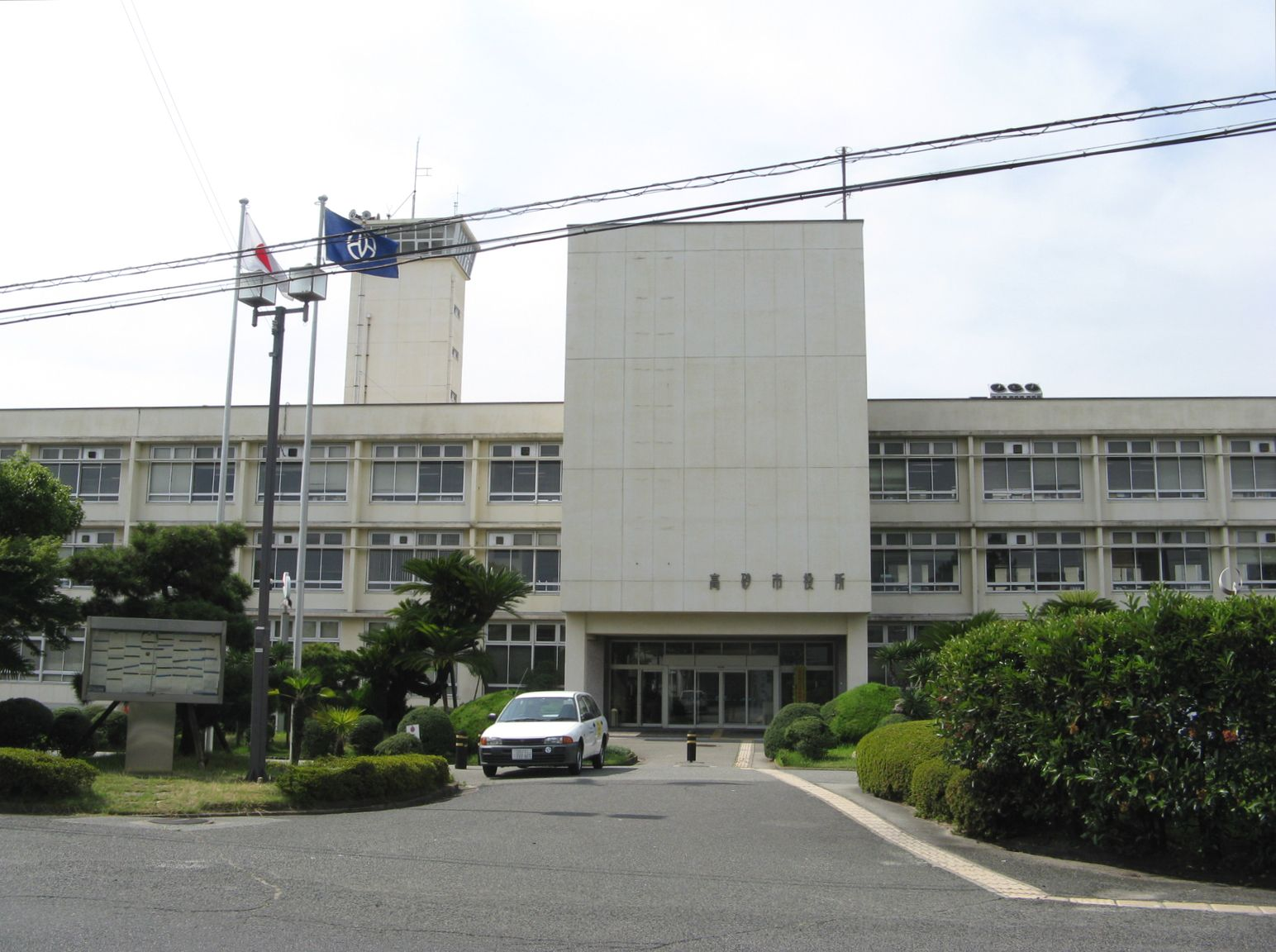
Takasago City Hall

Takasago (高砂市, Takasago-shi) is a city located in Hyōgo Prefecture, Japan. As of 31 December 2021, the city had an estimated population of 86,888 in 36,828 households and a population density of 2500 persons per km^{2}. The total area of the city is 34.38 km^{2} (13.27 sq mi).

== Geography ==
Takasago is located in southern Hyōgo prefecture facing Harima Bay on the Seto Inland Sea. Most of the city area is located in the alluvial plain formed on the west side of the mouth of the Kakogawa River, and the coastline is mostly reclaimed land. Tuffaceous rocky mountains are scattered throughout the city area, and the quarrying of these mountains since prehistoric times has resulted in a characteristic rocky landscape.

=== Neighbouring municipalities ===
Hyōgo Prefecture

- Himeji
- Kakogawa

=== Climate ===
Takasago has a Humid subtropical climate (Köppen Cfa) characterized by warm summers and cool winters with light to no snowfall. The average annual temperature in Takasago is 15.4 °C. The average annual rainfall is 1527 mm with September as the wettest month. The temperatures are highest on average in August, at around 26.5 °C, and lowest in January, at around 4.9 °C.

== Demographics ==
Per Japanese census data, the population of Takasago peaked in the 2000s and has gradually declined.

Historical population
Year	Pop.	±%
1960	53,565	—
1970	68,900	+28.6%
1980	86,463	+25.5%
1990	93,273	+7.9%
2000	96,020	+2.9%
2010	93,927	−2.2%

== History ==
The area of modern Takasago is part of ancient Harima Province. It has been settled since prehistoric times, and shell middens from the Jōmon period have been found along the coast. The area has been used as a quarry since at least the Kofun period and sarcophagi made from Takasago tuff have been found throughout the Kinai area. The place name "Takasago" is found in early Heian period documents, and it was known as a fishing port and for salt production. It was transformed into a castle town from the Muromachi period, and was a base of operations for Hashiba Hideyoshi's conquest of western Japan in the Sengoku period. In the Edo Period, its role was eclipsed by neighboring Himeji; however, it continued to prosper as a distribution center for goods based on shipping on the Kakogawa River, and as a key port for Himeji Domain. Takasago served as the inspiration for naming sumo wrestler Takasago Uragorō, who wrestled under the patronage of the Himeji. By extension, the town gave its name to Takasago stable.

The town of Takasago was created with the establishment of the modern municipalities system on April 1, 1889. On July 1, 1954 Takasago merged with the village of Arai and the town of Sone and village of Iho from Innami District to form the city of Takasago.

== Government ==
Takasago has a mayor-council form of government with a directly elected mayor and a unicameral city council of 19 members. Takasago contributes one member to the Hyogo Prefectural Assembly. In terms of national politics, the city is part of Hyōgo10th district of the lower house of the Diet of Japan.

== Economy ==
Takasago is located within the Harima Seaside Industrial Area and is a center for heavy industry, including steel mills, refineries and chemical processing. Many factories for major companies dot its skyline in the south, such as Mitsubishi Hitachi Power Systems, the Kobe Steel Takasago Manufacturing Complex, Mitsubishi Paper Mills, Takuma Power Plant, and Kikkoman Soy Sauce. In recent years, problems with industrial pollution, especially bottom sediment pollution caused by PCBs has become a political issue.

== Education ==
Takasago has ten public elementary schools and six public middle schools operated by the city government and three public high schools operated by the Hyōgo Prefectural Department of Education. There is also one private middle school and one private high school.

== Transportation ==
=== Railway ===
JR West – San'yō Main Line (JR Kobe Line)

- Hōden - Sone

Sanyo Electric Railway - Main Line

- Takasago - Arai - Iho - Sanyo Sone

=== Highways ===
- National Route 2 (Kobe, Okayama, Hiroshima, Shimonoseki)
- National Route 250 (Kobe, Okayama)

== Local attractions ==
- Ishi no Hōden, National Historic Site
- Takasago District Historic Building Preservation Zone
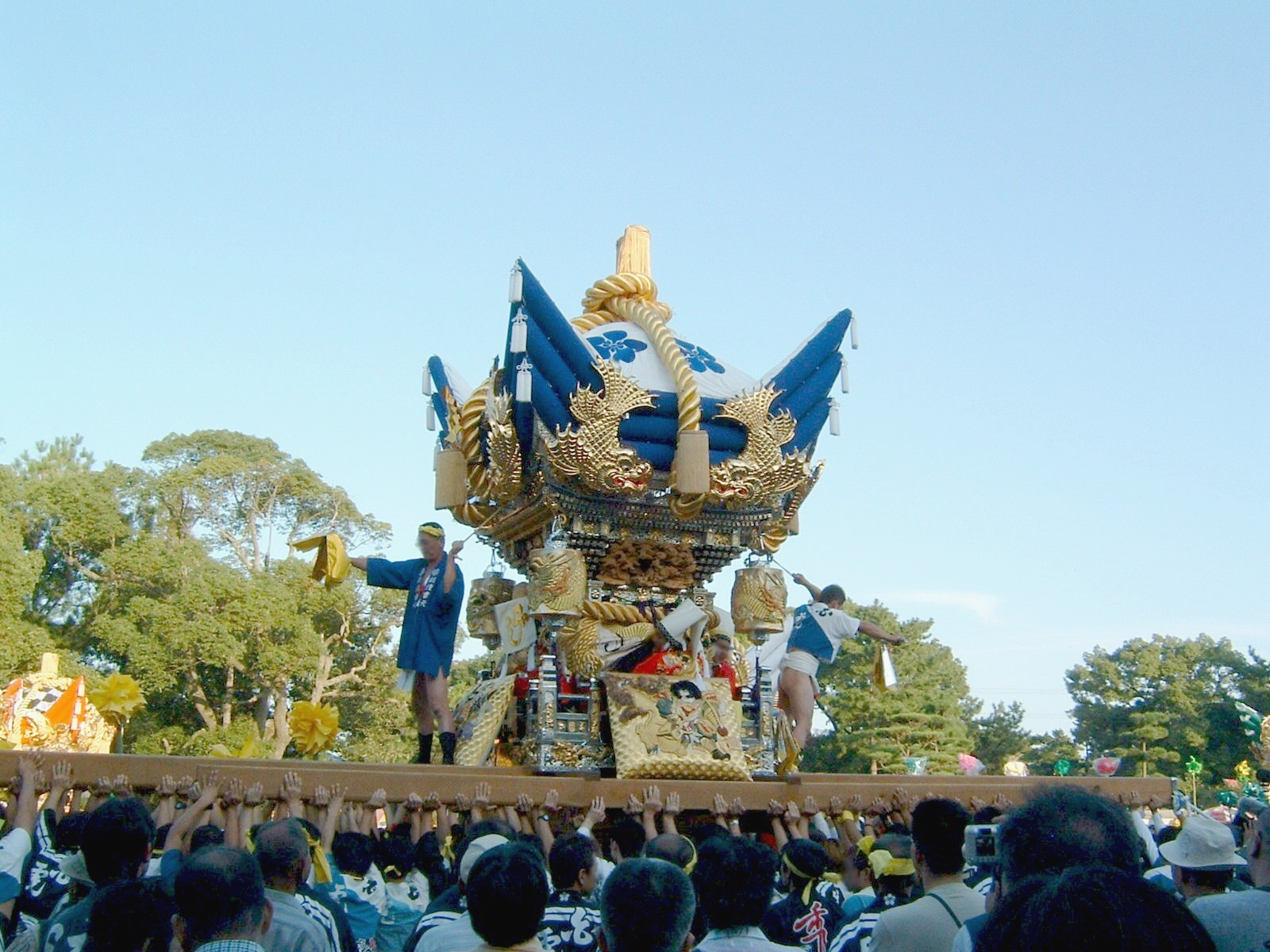
Futon Yatai in Sone Tenmangu Festival on October

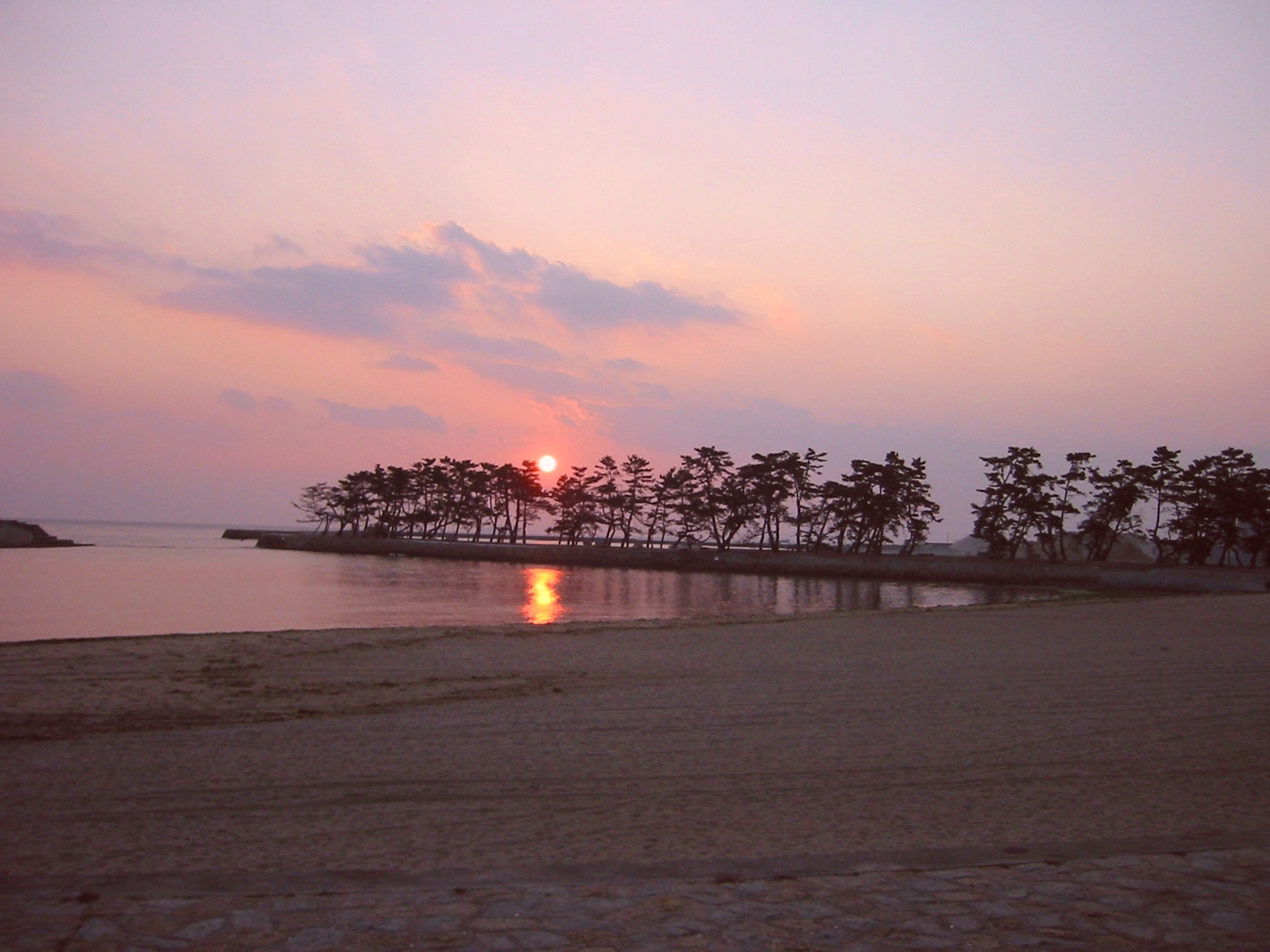
Pinus and Takasago Seaside park

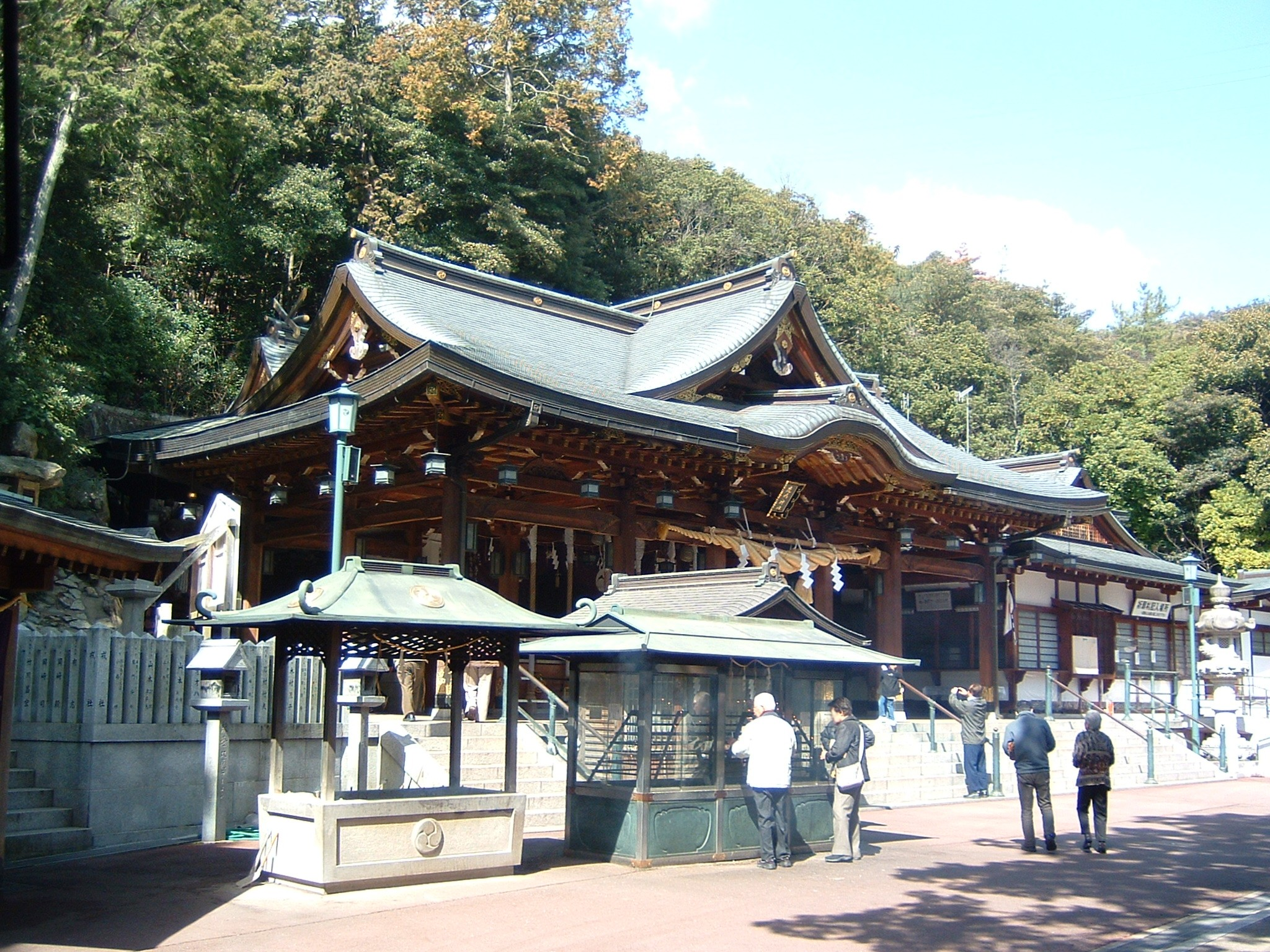
Takasago Kashima Shrine

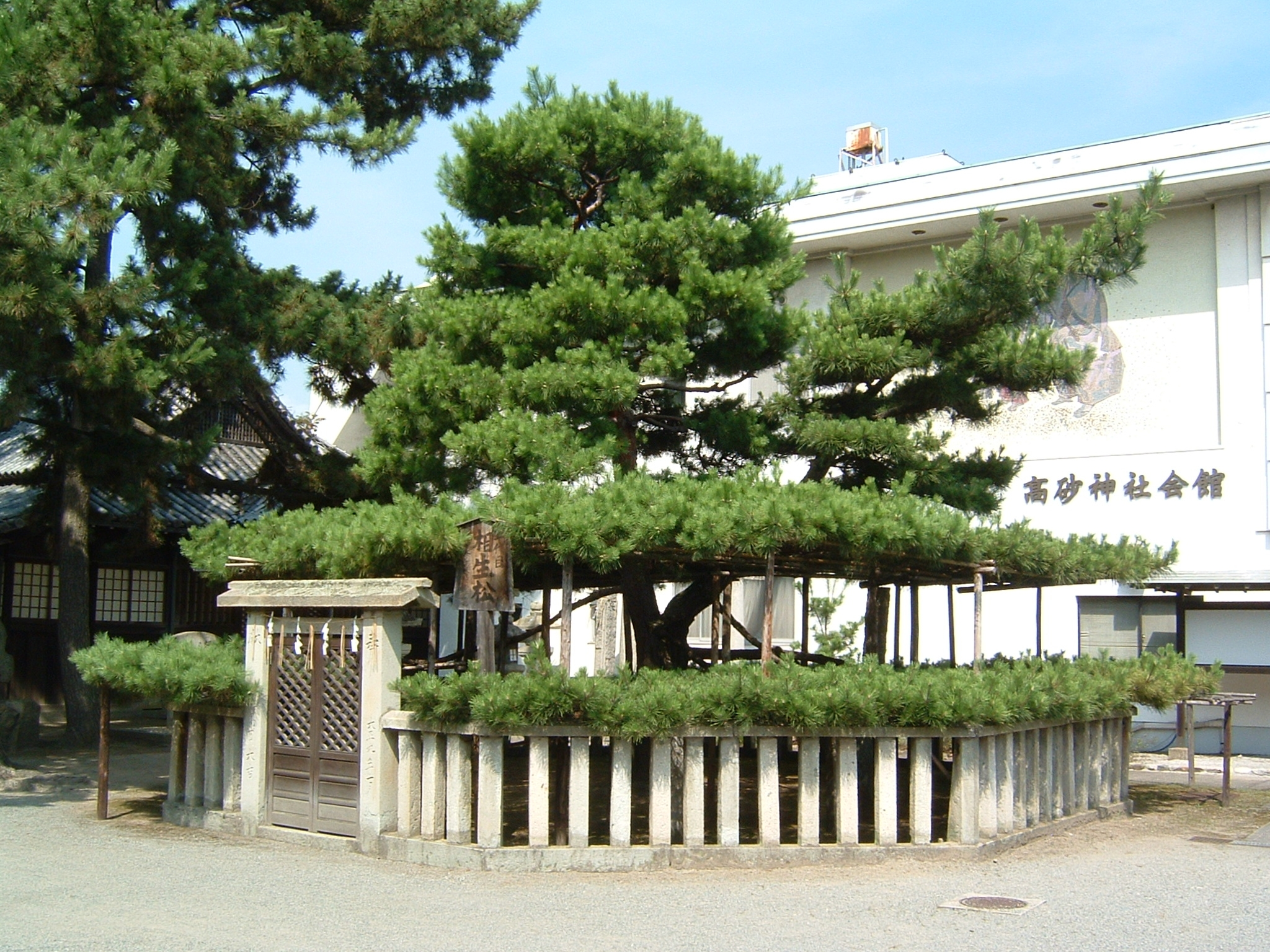
Aioi Pinus in Takasago Shrine

== Notable people from Takasago ==
- Kiyohiko Azuma, Japanese mangaka (Azumanga Daioh and Yotsuba&!)
- Yamagata Bantō, Japanese scholar and merchant
- Takumi Kawanishi, Japanese singer and dancer, member of JO1
- Kokuten Kōdō, Japanese film actor (Real Name: Tanigawa Saichirō, Nihongo: 谷川 佐市郎)
- Chiho Murata, Japanese women's professional shogi player ranked 2-dan and younger sister of Tomohiro Murata
- Tomohiro Murata, Japanese professional shogi player ranked 7-dan and older brother of Chiho Murata
- Kohei Oda, Japanese former professional baseball catcher (Yomiuri Giants and Chunichi Dragons, Nippon Professional Baseball - Central League)
- Ken Terauchi, Japanese diver (springboard and platform) - Originally from Takarazuka, Hyogo
- Keiko Teshima, Japanese judoka
- Myōgiryū Yasunari Japanese sumo wrestler
