= Maiko-kōen Station =

Railway station in Kobe, Japan

Maiko-kōen Station 舞子公園駅
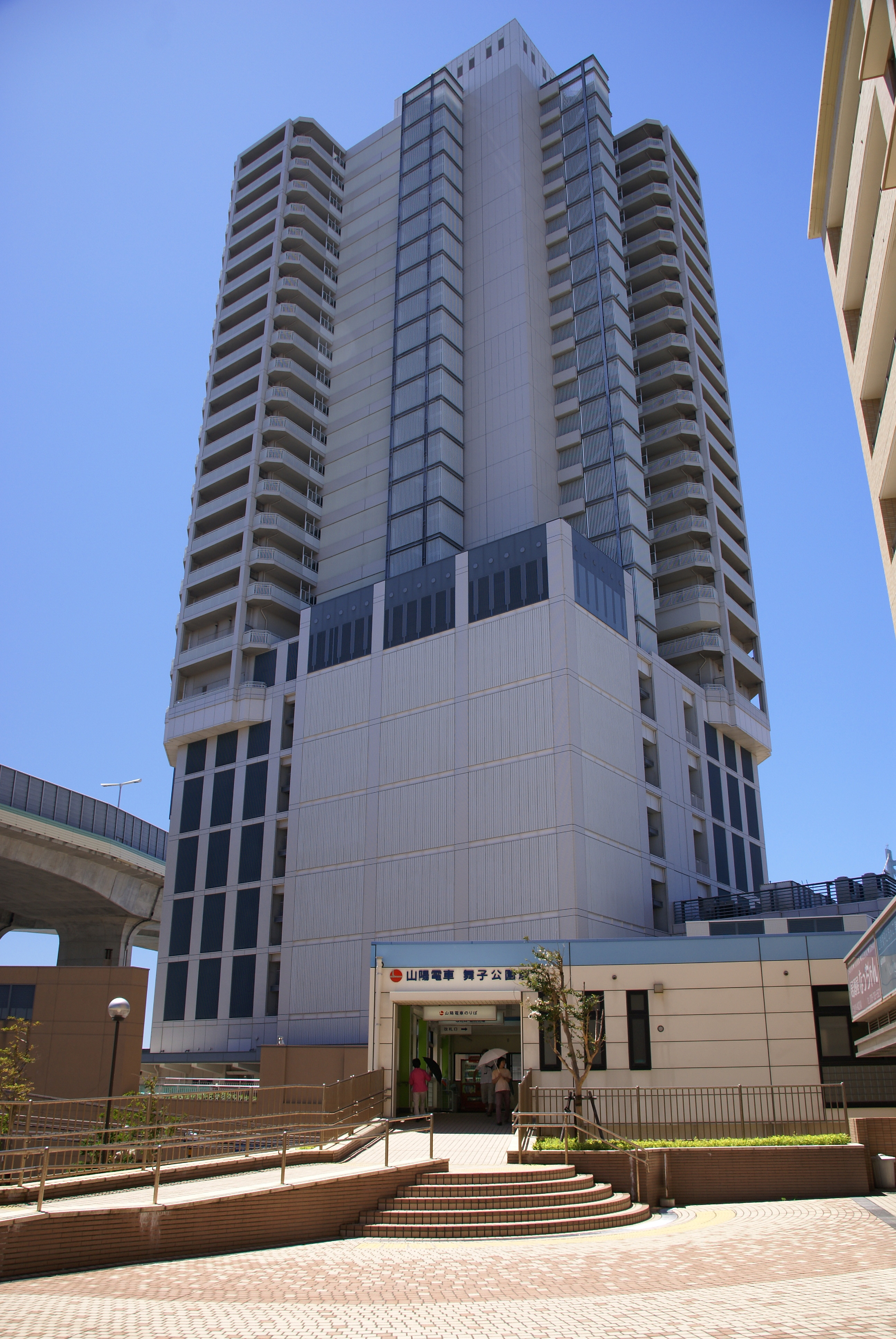
- Maiko-kōen Station building in front of high-rise Tio Maiko building

General information
- Location: 2-chōme-1 Maikodai, Tarumi-ku, Kobe-shi, Hyōgo-ken 655-0046; Japan
- Coordinates: 34°38′03″N 135°02′04″E
- Operator: Sanyo Electric Railway
- Line: ■ Main Line
- Distance: 11.5 km from Nishidai
- Platforms: 2 side platforms
- Connections

Other information
- Station code: SY13
- Website: Official website

History
- Opened: 12 April 1917
- Former names: Maiko (to 1935)

Passengers
- FY2019: 2567 (boarding only)
Location
- Location within Hyōgo Prefecture Location within Japan

Maiko-kōen Station (舞子公園駅, Maiko-kōen-eki) is a passenger railway station located in Tarumi-ku, Kobe, Hyōgo Prefecture, Japan, operated by the private Sanyo Electric Railway.

== Lines ==
Maiko-kōen Station is served by the Sanyo Electric Railway Main Line and is 11.5 kilometers from the terminus of the line at Nishidai.

== Station layout ==
The station consists of two unnumbered side platforms connected by an elevated station building. The station is unattended.

=== Platforms ===
south	■ Main Line	for Sanyo Akashi, Sanyo Himeji and Sanyo-Aboshi
north	■ Main Line	for Sannomiya and Osaka

== Adjacent stations ==
«	Service	»
Sanyo Electric Railway
Sanyo Electric Railway Main Line
Kasumigaoka	Local	Nishi-Maiko
S Limited express: Does not stop at this station
Sanyo Tarumi	Through limited express	Sanyo Akashi

== History ==
Maiko-kōen Station opened on April 12, 1917 as Maiko Station (舞子駅). It was renamed to its present name on August 1, 1935.

== Passenger statistics ==
In fiscal 2018, the station was used by an average of 2567 passengers daily (boarding passengers only).

== Surrounding area ==
- Tio Maiko
- JR Maiko Station
- Bridge Science Museum

== See also ==
- List of railway stations in Japan
