= Maiko Station =

Railway station in Kobe, Japan

Maiko Station 舞子駅
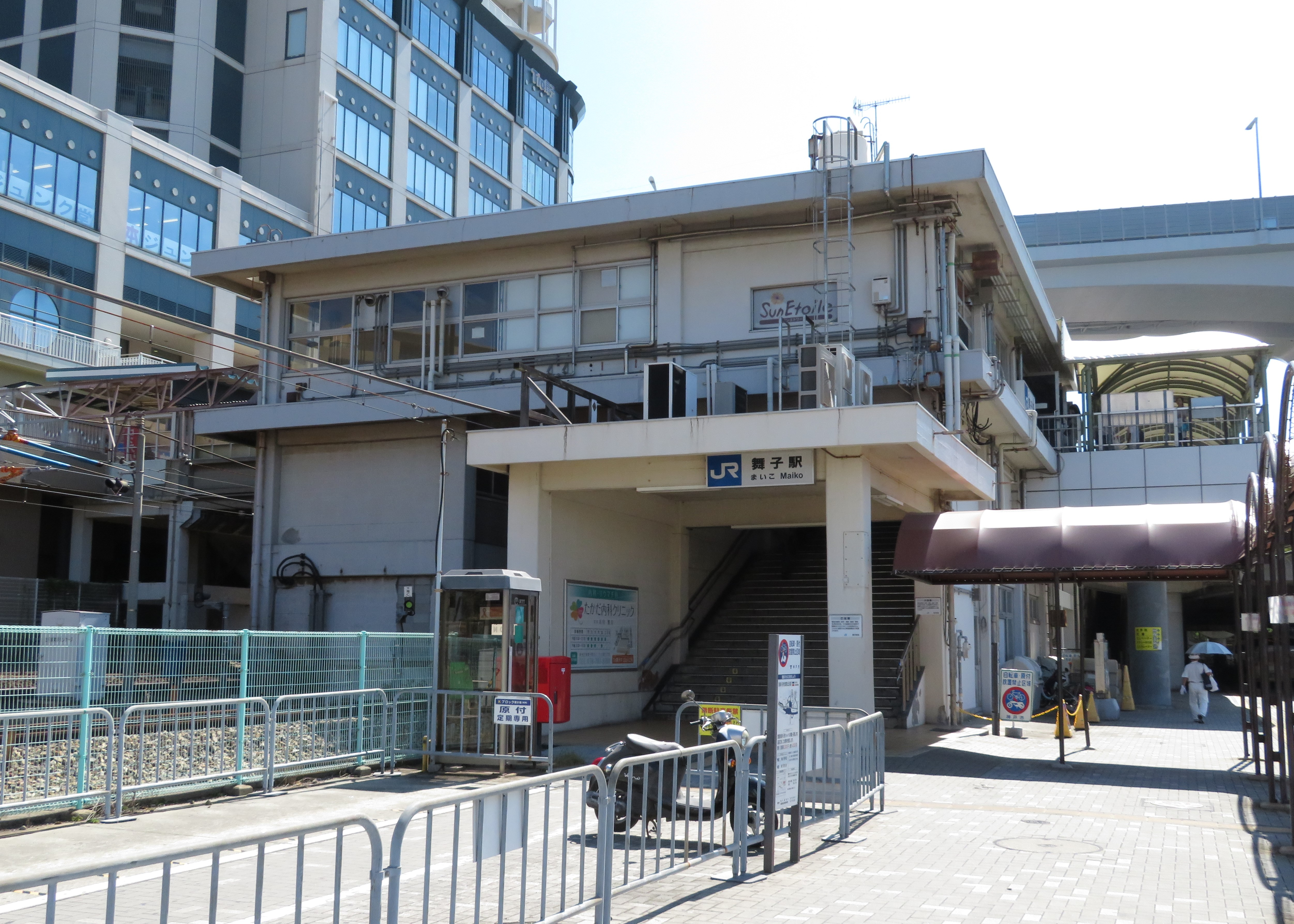
- Maiko Station, September 2019

General information
- Location: 3-1 Higashimaiko-chō, Tarumi-ku, Kobe-shi, Hyōgo-ken 655-0047; Japan
- Coordinates: 34°38′01″N 135°02′02″E
- Owner: West Japan Railway Company
- Operator: West Japan Railway Company
- Line: San'yō Main Line
- Distance: 15.1 km (9.4 miles) from Kobe
- Platforms: 1 island platforms
- Connections: Bus stop

Construction
- Structure type: Elevated
- Accessible: Yes

Other information
- Status: Staffed (Midori no Madoguchi )
- Station code: JR-A71
- Website: Official website

History
- Opened: 1 July 1896

Passengers
- FY2019: 18,856 daily
Location
- Location within Hyōgo Prefecture Location within Japan

Maiko Station (舞子駅, Maiko-eki) is a passenger railway station located in Tarumi-ku, Kobe, Hyōgo Prefecture, Japan, operated by the West Japan Railway Company (JR West). This station is the closest on the line to the Akashi Kaikyō Bridge, which is directly above the station and is also near Kyogo Prefectural Maiko Park.

== Lines ==
Maiko Station is served by the JR San'yō Main Line (also referred to as the JR Kobe Line), and is located 15.1 kilometers from the terminus of the line at Kobe and 48.2 kilometers from Osaka.

== Station layout ==
The station consists of one island platform connected to the station building by a footbridge. The station has a Midori no Madoguchi staffed ticket office. Special Rapid Service trains typically bypass the station on the two northernmost tracks while local trains normally stop at the station on the two southernmost tracks.

=== Platforms ===
1	■ JR Kobe Line	for Nishi-Akashi and Himeji
2	■ JR Kobe Line	for Sannomiya, Amagasaki, and Osaka

== Adjacent stations ==
«	Service	»
JR West
Sanyō Main Line (JR Kobe Line)
Special Rapid Service: Does not stop at this station
Rapid Service (on the express track): Does not stop at this station
Tarumi	Rapid Service (on the transit track)	Akashi
Tarumi	Local trains	Asagiri

== History ==
Maiko Station opened on 1 July 1896 as a temporary stop, and was promoted to a full station on 1 December 1906. With the privatization of the Japan National Railways (JNR) on 1 April 1987, the station came under the aegis of the West Japan Railway Company.

Station numbering was introduced in March 2018 with Maiko being assigned station number JR-A71.

== Passenger statistics ==
In fiscal 2019, the station was used by an average of 18,856 passengers daily

== Surrounding area ==
- Maiko-kōen Station (Sanyo Electric Railway Main Line)
- Hyogo Prefectural Maiko Park
- Akashi Kaikyō Bridge
- Sun Yat-sen Memorial Hall
- Akashi Domain Maiko Battery, National Historic Site

== See also ==
- List of railway stations in Japan
