= Sanyo-Akashi Station =

Railway station in Akashi, Hyōgo Prefecture, Japan

Sanyo-Akashi Station 山陽明石駅
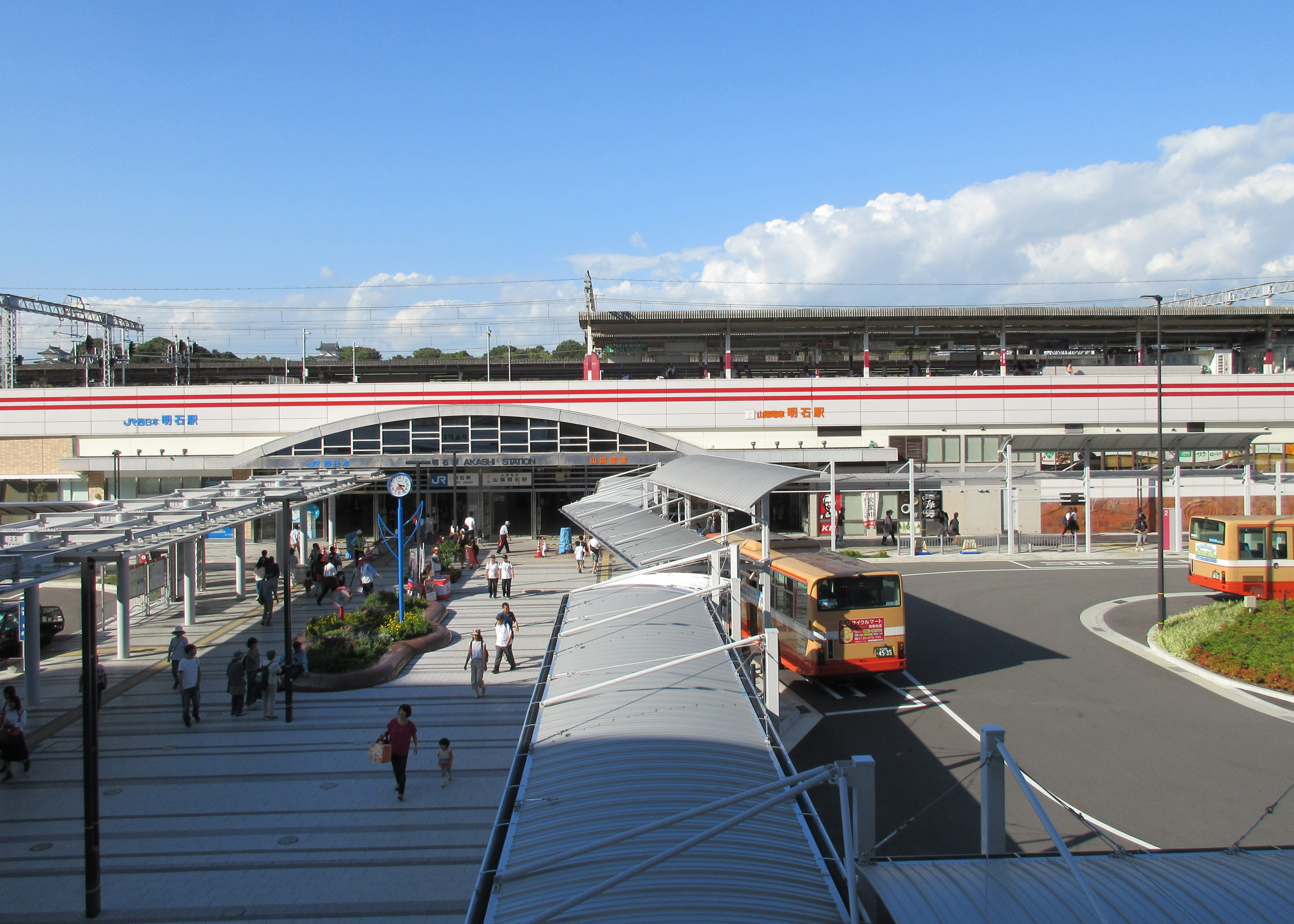
- Sanyo Akashi Station, September 2017

General information
- Location: 1-chōme-4 Ōakashichō, Akashi-shi, Hyōgo-ken 673-0891; Japan
- Coordinates: 34.648743°N 134.993262°E
- Operator: Sanyo Electric Railway
- Line: ■ Main Line
- Distance: 15.7 km from Nishidai
- Platforms: 2 island platforms
- Connections

Other information
- Station code: SY17
- Website: Official website

History
- Opened: 12 April 1917
- Former names: Akashi-ekimae (1917–1923); Akashi (1923–1943); Dentetsu-Akashi (1943–1991)

Passengers
- FY2019: 15,225 (boarding only)
Location
- Location within Hyōgo Prefecture Location within Japan

Sanyo-Akashi Station (山陽明石駅, San'yō Akashi-eki) is a passenger railway station located in the city of Akashi, Hyōgo Prefecture, Japan, operated by the private Sanyo Electric Railway.

== Lines ==
Sanyo-Akashi Station is served by the Sanyo Electric Railway Main Line and is 15.7 km (9.8 mi) from the terminus of the line at Nishidai.

== Station layout ==
The station consists of two elevated island platforms with the station building underneath. The station is staffed.

=== Platforms ===
1, 2	■ Main Line	for Takasago, Himeji and Sanyo-Aboshi
3, 4	■ Main Line	for Kobe and Osaka

== Adjacent stations ==
«	Service	»
Sanyo Electric Railway
Sanyo Electric Railway Main Line
Hitomarumae	Local	Nishi-Shimmachi
Kasumigaoka	S Limited Express	Fujie
Maiko-kōen	Through Limited Express	Higashi-Futami

== History ==
Sanyo-Akashi Station opened on 12 April 1917 as Akashi-ekimae Station (明石駅前駅). It was renamed Akashi Station (明石駅) on 19 August 1923, and Dentetsu-Akashi Station (電鉄明石駅) on 20 November 1943. It was renamed to its present name on 7 April 1991.

== Passenger statistics ==
In fiscal 2018, the station was used by an average of 15,225 passengers daily (boarding passengers only).

== Surrounding area ==
- Akashi Station, JR West
- Akashi Castle

== See also ==
- List of railway stations in Japan
