= Nishidai Station (Hyōgo) =

Railway station in Kobe, Japan

Coordinates: 34.6623785°N 135.144099°E

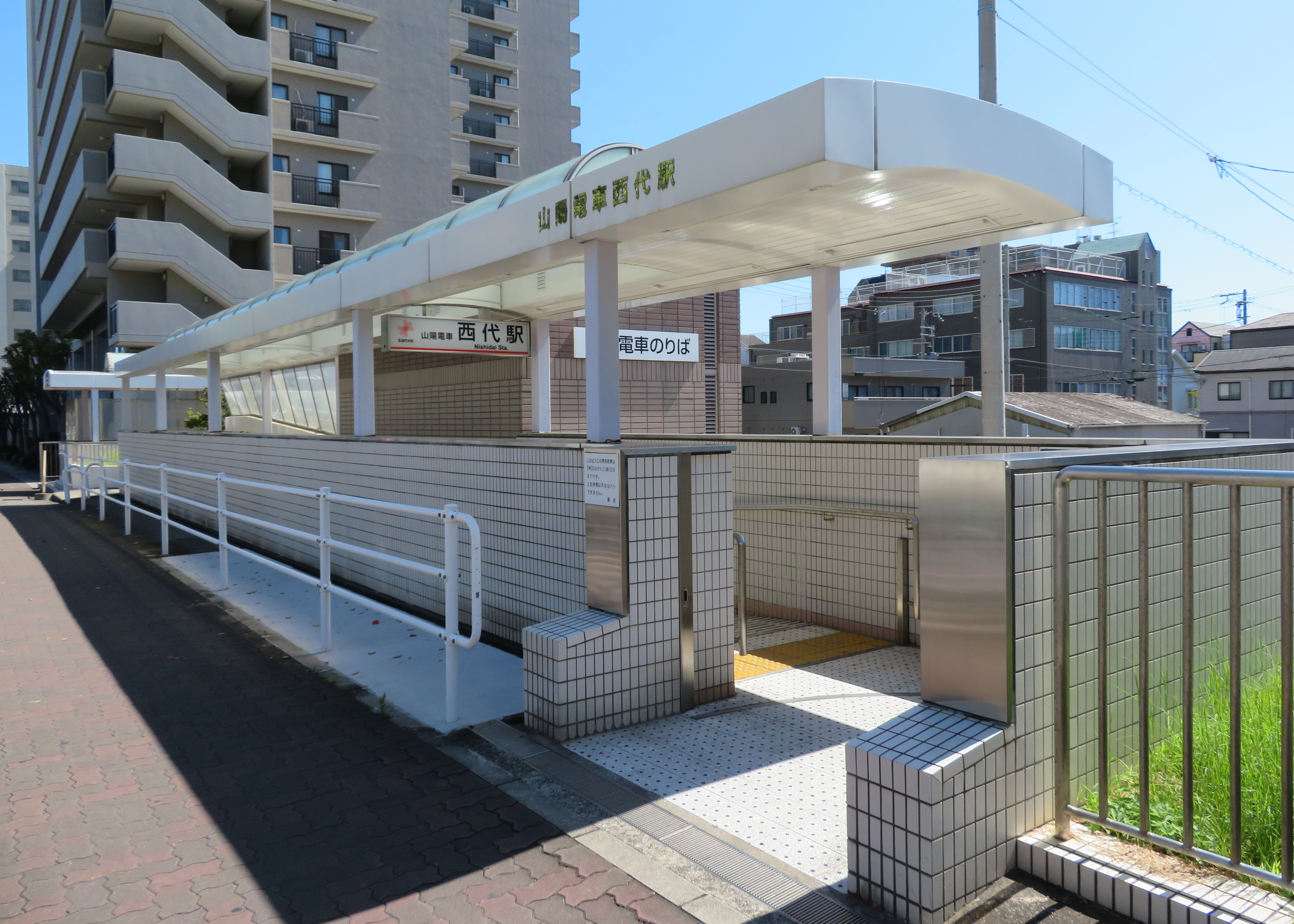
Station entrance

Nishidai Station (西代駅, Nishidai-eki) is a train station in Suma-ku, Kobe, Hyōgo Prefecture, Japan.

== Lines ==
- Sanyo Electric Railway

- Main Line (SY 01)

- Hanshin Electric Railway

- Kōbe Kosoku Line (HS 39)

Both lines have through operations via this station.

== Adjacent stations ==
«	Service	»
Sanyo Railway Main Line (SY 01)
Hanshin Railway Kōbe Kosoku Line (HS 39)
Kosoku Nagata (Kōbe Kosoku Line, HS 38)	Sanyo Local	Itayado (Sanyo, SY 02)
Kosoku Nagata (Kōbe Kosoku Line, HS 38)	Hanshin Local	Itayado (Sanyo, SY 02)
Kosoku Nagata (Kōbe Kosoku Line, HS 38)	Hanshin Limited Express	Itayado (Sanyo, SY 02)
Kosoku Nagata (Kōbe Kosoku Line, HS 38)	S Limited Express	Itayado (Sanyo, SY 02)
Kosoku Nagata (Kōbe Kosoku Line, HS 38)	Through Limited Express (yellow marking)	Itayado (Sanyo, SY 02)
Through Limited Express (red marking): Does not stop at this station
