= Futami =

Futami (written: ふたみ, 二見) is a surname. may refer to:

== Places ==
=== Japan ===
- Futami, Ehime, a dissolved town in Iyo District, Ehime Prefecture
- Futami, Mie, a dissolved town in Watarai District, Mie Prefecture
- Futami District, Hokkaido, a district
- Futami District, Hiroshima, a dissolved district

Railway stations

- Higashi-Futami Station, on the Sanyo Electric Railway Main Line in Akashi, Hyōgo
- Higo Futami Station, in Yatsushiro, Kumamoto Prefecture
- Nagato-Futami Station, in the Hohoku area of Shimonoseki, Yamaguchi Prefecture
- Nishi-Futami Station, in Akashi, Hyōgo Prefecture
- Yamato-Futami Station, in Gojō, Nara

== Other uses ==
- Hiroshi Futami (二見 宏志, born 1992), Japanese footballer
- Nobuaki Futami (born 1935), Japanese politician
- Kazuki Futami
- Japanese gunboat Futami, a river gunboat of the Imperial Japanese Navy

=== Fictional characters ===
- Ami and Mami Futami (双海 亜美・真美), a pair of twin sisters in The Idolmaster
- Nozomu Futami, a main character in Futakoi
