= Befu Station =

Befu Station (別府駅) may refer to:

- Befu Station (Fukuoka), a subway station in Fukuoka, Japan
- Befu Station (Hyogo), a train station in Kakogawa, Hyōgo Prefecture, Japan
- Beppu Station, a passenger railway station in Beppu, Japan
