= Fujie Station =

Railway station in Akashi, Hyōgo Prefecture, Japan

Fujie Station 藤江駅
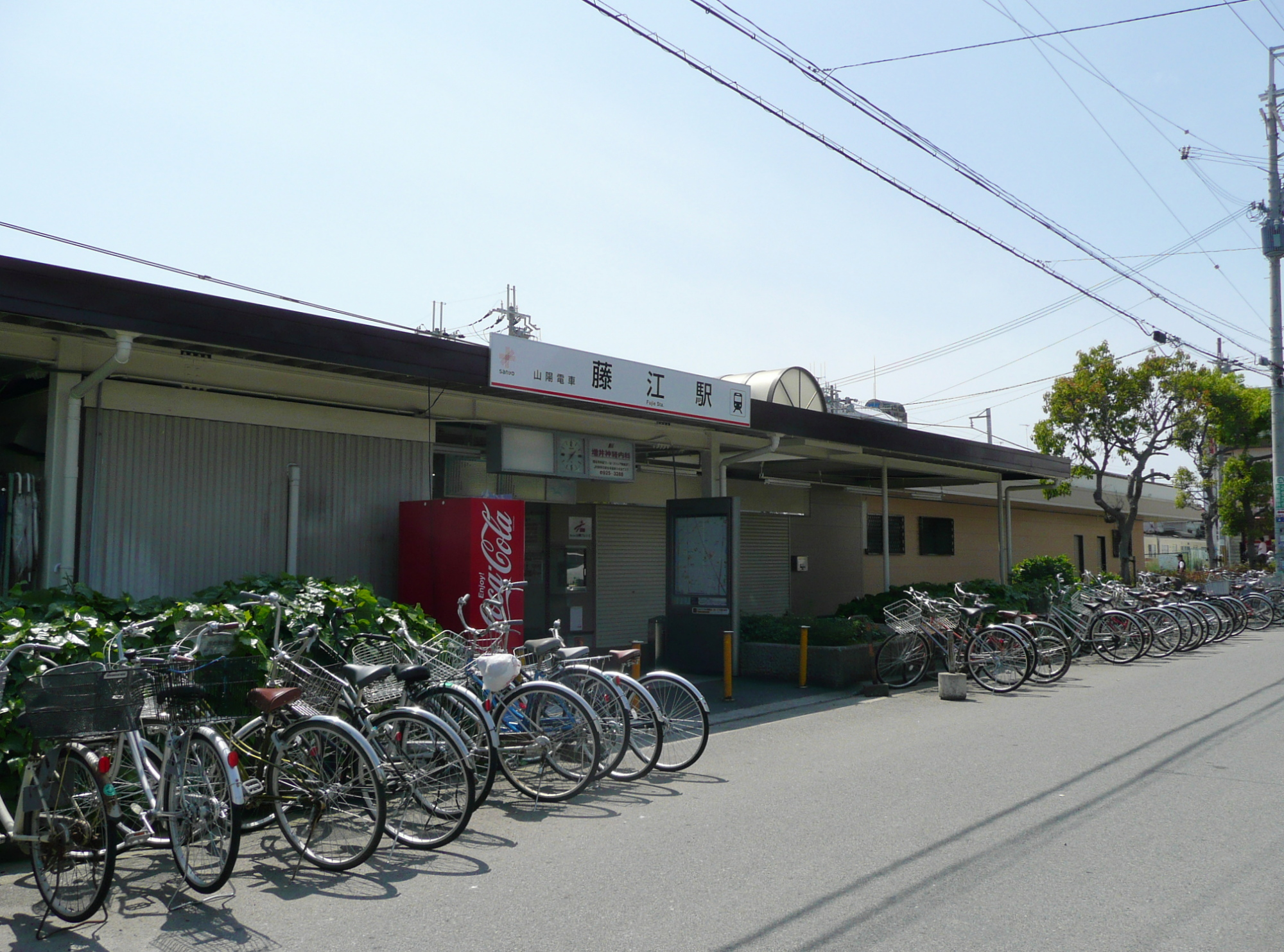
- Fujie Station, May 2008

General information
- Location: Fujie, Akashi-shi, Hyōgo-ken 673-0044; Japan
- Coordinates: 34.6634°N 134.9477°E
- Operator: Sanyo Electric Railway
- Line: ■ Main Line
- Distance: 20.4 km from Nishidai
- Platforms: 1 side + 1 island platform
- Connections

Other information
- Station code: SY20
- Website: Official website

History
- Opened: 19 August 1923

Passengers
- FY2019: 1773 (boarding only)
Location
- Location within Hyōgo Prefecture Location within Japan

Fujie Station (藤江駅, Fujie-eki) is a passenger railway station located in the city of Akashi, Hyōgo Prefecture, Japan, operated by the private Sanyo Electric Railway.

== Lines ==
Fujie Station is served by the Sanyo Electric Railway Main Line and is 20.4 kilometers from the terminus of the line at Nishidai.

== Station layout ==
The station consists of one side platform and one island platform connected by a level crossing. The station is unattended.

=== Platforms ===
1	■ Main Line	for Takasago, Himeji and Sanyo-Aboshi
2, 3	■ Main Line	for Kobe and Osaka

== Adjacent stations ==
«	Service	»
Sanyo Electric Railway
Sanyo Electric Railway Main Line
Hayashisaki-Matsuekaigan	Local	Nakayagi
Sanyo Akashi	Sanyo S Limited Express	Higashi-Futami
Through Limited Express: Does not stop at this station

== History ==
Fujie Station opened on August 19, 1923.

== Passenger statistics ==
In fiscal 2018, the station was used by an average of 1773 passengers daily (boarding passengers only).

== Surrounding area ==
- Byobugaura coast
- Misaki Shrine
- Seiryu Shrine
- Beach promenade (Harima Cycling Road)

== See also ==
- List of railway stations in Japan
