= Sanyo-Uozumi Station =

Railway station in Akashi, Hyōgo Prefecture, Japan

Sanyo-Uozumi Station 山陽魚住駅
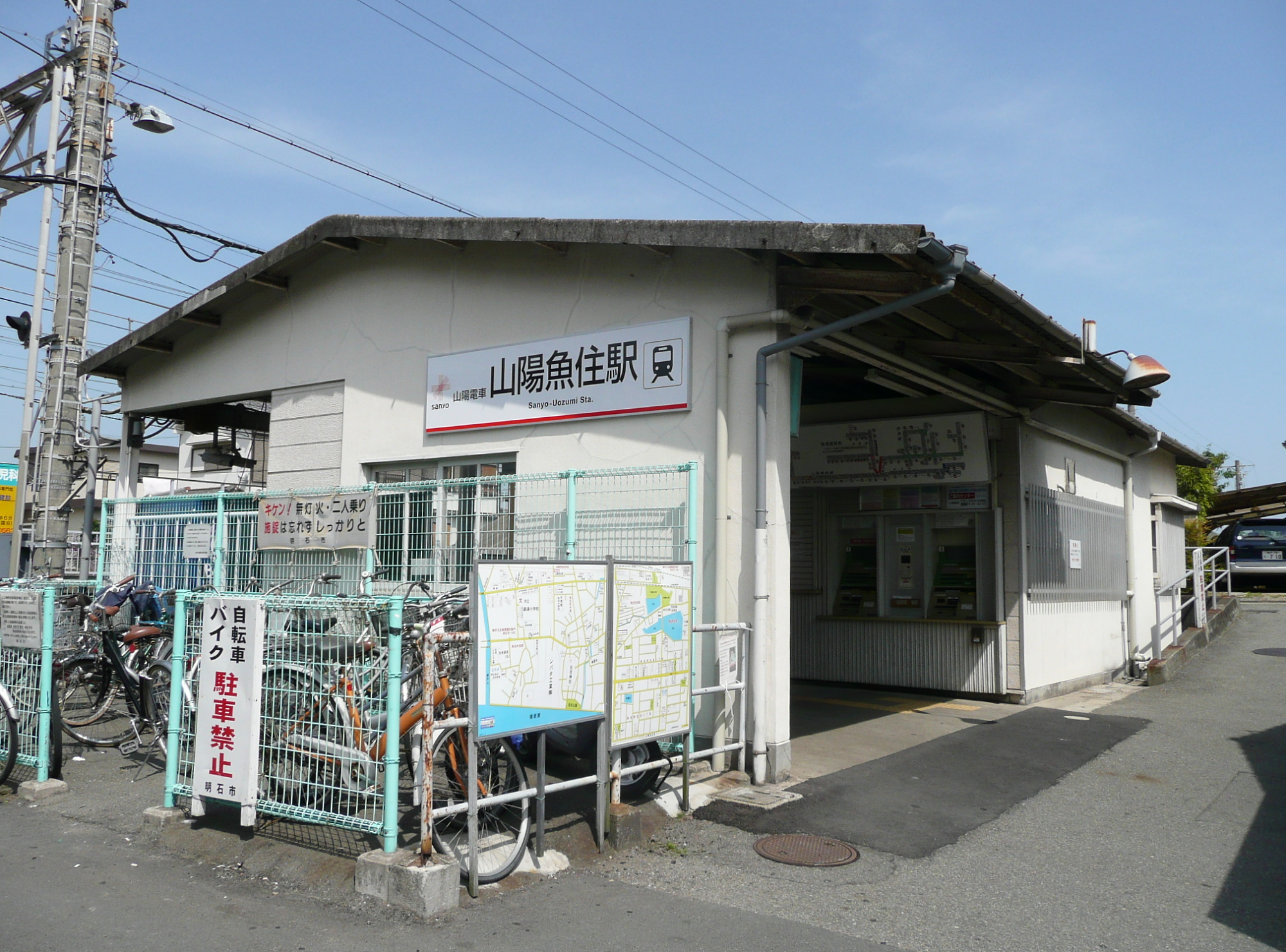
- Sanyo-Uozumi Station, May 2008

General information
- Location: Nakao Uozumi-chō, Akashi-shi, Hyōgo-ken 674-0082; Japan
- Coordinates: 34.6895°N 134.9020°E
- Operator: Sanyo Electric Railway
- Line: ■ Main Line
- Distance: 25.6 km from Nishidai
- Platforms: 2 side platforms

Other information
- Station code: SY24
- Website: Official website

History
- Opened: 19 August 1923
- Closed: 1945-1947
- Former names: Uozumi Station (to 1991)

Passengers
- FY2019: 1,342 (boarding only)
Location
- Location within Hyōgo Prefecture Location within Japan

Sanyo-Uozumi Station (山陽魚住駅, Sanyō Uozumi-eki) is a passenger railway station located in the city of Akashi, Hyōgo Prefecture, Japan, operated by the private Sanyo Electric Railway.

== Lines ==
Sanyo-Uozumi Station is served by the Sanyo Electric Railway Main Line and is 25.6 kilometers from the terminus of the line at Nishidai.

== Station layout ==
The station consists of two unnumbered elevated side platforms connected by an underground passage. The station is unattended.

=== Platforms ===
Station side	■ Main Line	for Takasago, Himeji and Sanyo-Aboshi
Opposite side	■ Main Line	for Akashi, Sannomiya and Osaka

== Adjacent stations ==
«	Service	»
Sanyo Electric Railway
Sanyo Electric Railway Main Line
Nishi-Eigashima	Sanyo Local	Higashi-Futami
Sanyo S Limited Express: Does not stop at this station
Through Limited Express: Does not stop at this station

== History ==
Sanyo-Uozumi Station opened on August 19, 1923, as Uozumi Station (魚住駅). It was closed on July 20, 1945, and reopened on November 15, 1947. It was renamed to its present name on April 7, 1991.

== Passenger statistics ==
In fiscal 2018, the station was used by an average of 1,342 passengers daily (boarding passengers only).

== Surrounding area ==
- Sumiyoshi Shrine (Sumiyoshi Park)
- Yakushi-in (Peony Temple)
- Nakao Water Park
- JR West Uozumi Station

== See also ==
- List of railway stations in Japan
