= Hayashisaki-Matsuekaigan Station =

Railway station in Akashi, Hyōgo Prefecture, Japan

Hayashisaki-Matsuekaigan Station 林崎松江海岸駅
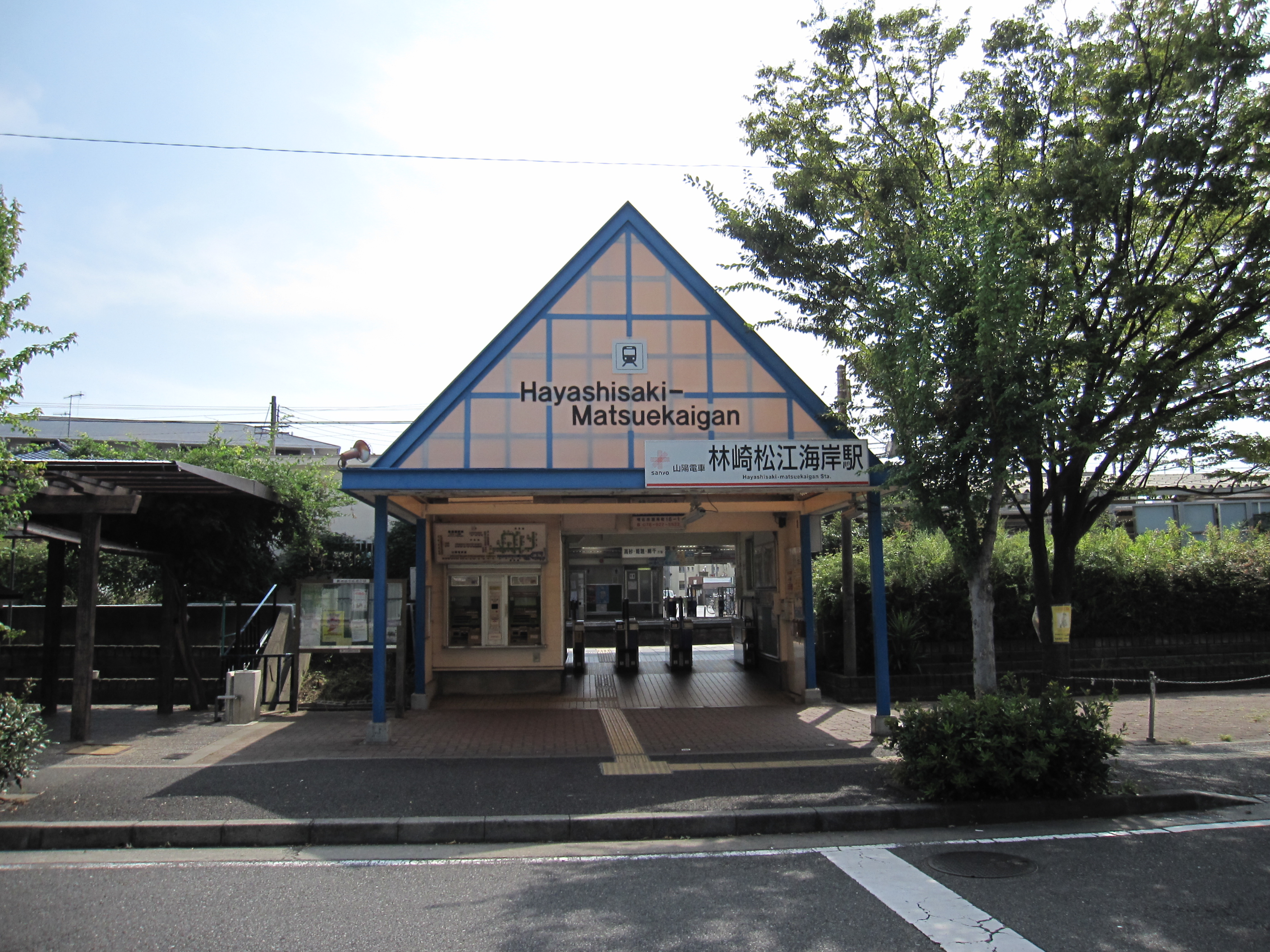
- Hayashisaki-Matsuekaigan Station, North exit, August 2011

General information
- Location: 2 Minamikisakichō, Akashi-shi, Hyōgo-ken 673-0035; Japan
- Coordinates: 34.6525°N 134.9650°E
- Operator: Sanyo Electric Railway
- Line: ■ Main Line
- Distance: 18.4 km from Nishidai
- Platforms: 2 side platforms
- Connections

Other information
- Station code: SY19
- Website: Official website

History
- Opened: 3 May 1941
- Former names: Dentetsu-Hayashisaki (to 1991)

Passengers
- FY2019: 2899 (boarding only)
Location
- Location within Hyōgo Prefecture Location within Japan

Hayashisaki-Matsuekaigan Station (林崎松江海岸駅, Hayashisaki-Matsuekaigan-eki) is a passenger railway station located in the city of Akashi, Hyōgo Prefecture, Japan, operated by the private Sanyo Electric Railway.

== Lines ==
Hayashisaki-Matsuekaigan Station is served by the Sanyo Electric Railway Main Line and is 18.4 kilometers from the terminus of the line at Nishidai.

== Station layout ==
The station consists of two unnumbered opposed ground-level side platforms connected by an underground passage. The station is unattended.

=== Platforms ===
south	■ Main Line	for Takasago, Himeji and Sanyo-Aboshi
north	■ Main Line	for Akashi, Kobe and Osaka

== Adjacent stations ==
«	Service	»
Sanyo Electric Railway
Sanyo Electric Railway Main Line
Nishi-Shimmachi	Sanyo Local	Fujie
Through Limited Express: Does not stop at this station
Sanyo S Limited Express: Does not stop at this station

== History ==
Hayashisaki-Matsuekaigan Station opened on May 3, 1941 as Dentetsu-Hayashisaki Station (電鉄林崎駅). It was renamed on April 7, 1991

== Passenger statistics ==
In fiscal 2018, the station was used by an average of 2899 passengers daily (boarding passengers only).

== Surrounding area ==
- Kawasaki Heavy Industries Akashi Factory

== See also ==
- List of railway stations in Japan
