= Nishi-Shimmachi Station =

Railway station in Akashi, Hyōgo Prefecture, Japan

Nishi-Shimmachi Station 西新町駅
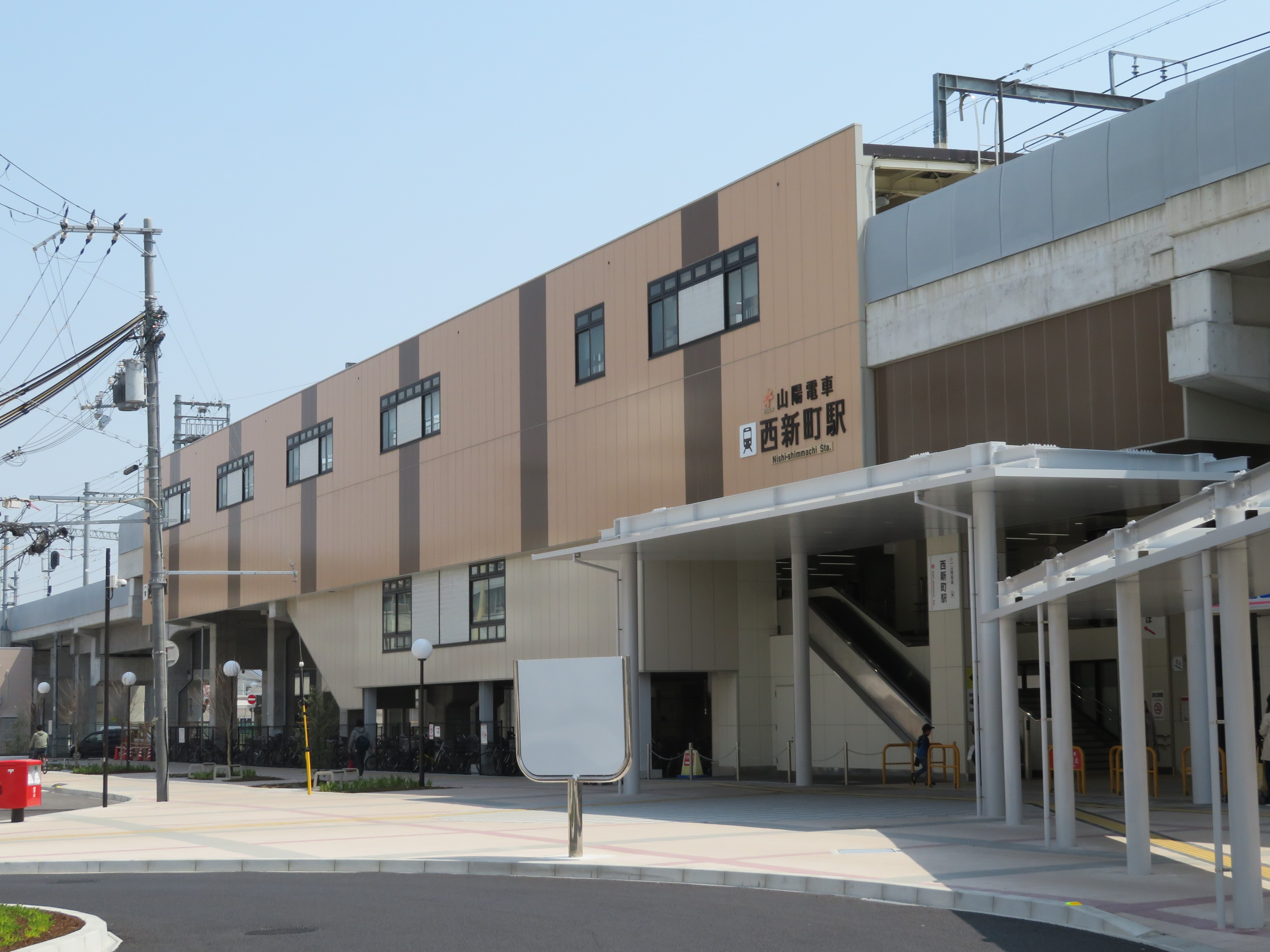
- Nishi-Shimmachi Station, April 2019

General information
- Location: 3-chōme-13 Nishishinmachi, Akashi-shi, Hyōgo-ken 673-0023; Japan
- Coordinates: 34.6495°N 134.9806°E
- Operator: Sanyo Electric Railway
- Line: ■ Main Line
- Distance: 16.9 km from Nishidai
- Platforms: 2 side platforms
- Connections

Other information
- Station code: SY18
- Website: Official website

History
- Opened: 19 August 1923

Passengers
- FY2019: 2712 (boarding only)
Location
- Location within Hyōgo Prefecture Location within Japan

Nishi-Shimmachi Station (西新町駅, Nishi-Shimmachi-eki) is a passenger railway station located in the city of Akashi, Hyōgo Prefecture, Japan, operated by the private Sanyo Electric Railway.

== Lines ==
Nishi-Shimmachi Station is served by the Sanyo Electric Railway Main Line and is 16.9 kilometers from the terminus of the line at Nishidai.

== Station layout ==
The station consists of two elevated side platforms with the station building underneath. The station is unattended.

=== Platforms ===
1	■ Main Line	for Takasago, Himeji and Sanyo-Aboshi
2	■ Main Line	for Akashi, Kobe and Osaka

== Adjacent stations ==
«	Service	»
Sanyo Electric Railway
Sanyo Electric Railway Main Line
Sanyo Akashi	Local	Hayashisaki-Matsuekaigan
Through Limited Express: Does not stop at this station
Sanyo S Limited Express: Does not stop at this station

== History ==
Nishi-Shimmachi Station opened on August 19, 1923.

== Passenger statistics ==
In fiscal 2018, the station was used by an average of 2712 passengers daily (boarding passengers only).

== Surrounding area ==
- Mitsuzo-in (Daijizo)
- Hayashizaki Fishing Port
- Site of Funage Castle
- Hyogo Prefectural Akashi Nishi Park

== See also ==
- List of railway stations in Japan
