= Hamanomiya Station =

Railway station in Kakogawa, Hyōgo Prefecture, Japan

Hamanomiya Station 浜の宮駅
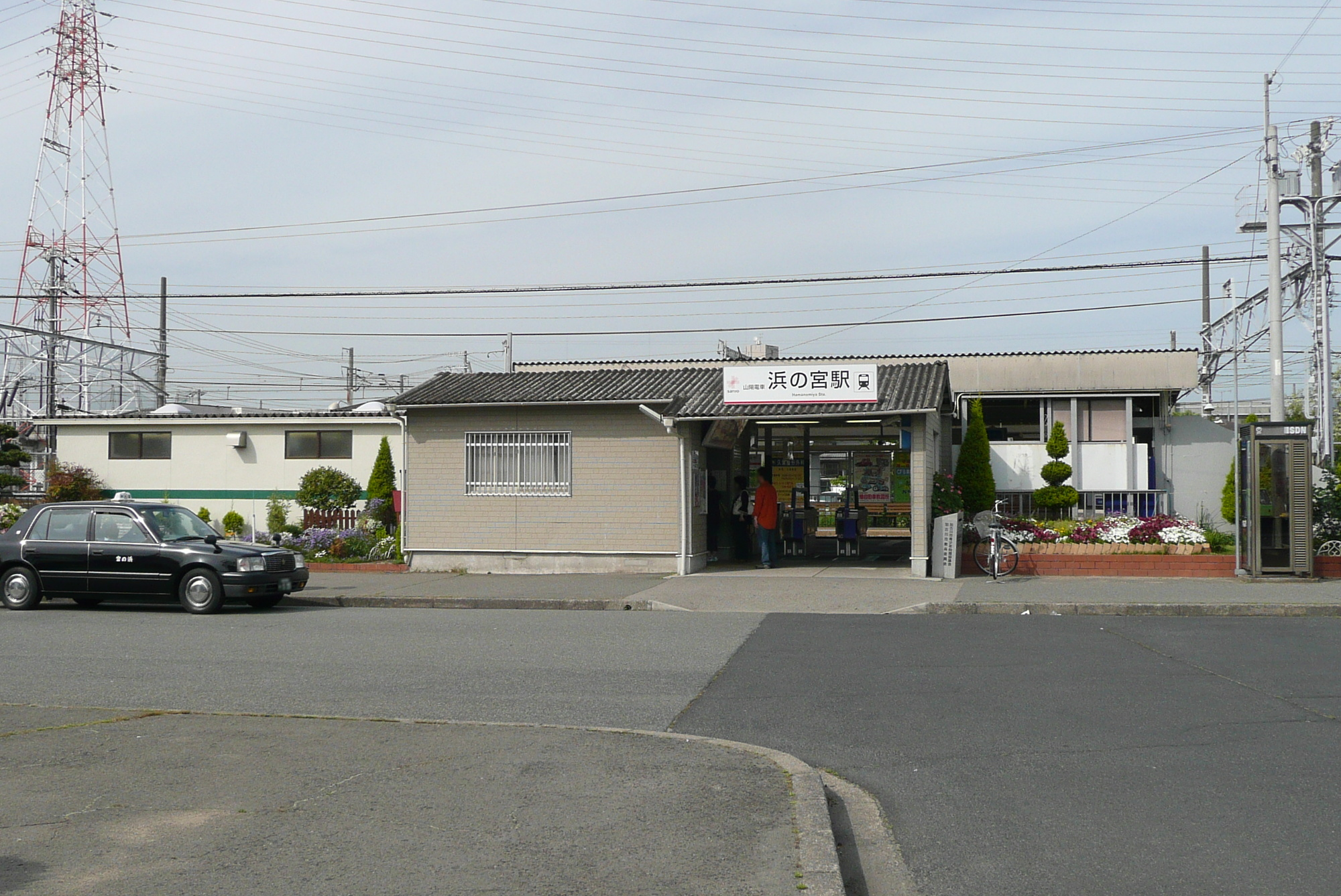
- Hamanomiya Station, May 2008

General information
- Location: Kuchiri Onoe-chō, Kakogawa-shi, Hyōgo-ken 675-0022; Japan
- Coordinates: 34.7408°N 134.8340°E
- Operator: Sanyo Electric Railway
- Line: ■ Main Line
- Distance: 34.1 km from Nishidai
- Platforms: 2 side platforms
- Connections

Other information
- Station code: SY29
- Website: Official website

History
- Opened: 19 August 1923

Passengers
- FY2019: 2540 (boarding only)
Location
- Location within Hyōgo Prefecture Location within Japan

Hamanomiya Station (浜の宮駅, Hamanomiya-eki) is a passenger railway station located in the city of Kakogawa, Hyōgo Prefecture, Japan, operated by the private Sanyo Electric Railway.

== Lines ==
Hamanomiya Station is served by the Sanyo Electric Railway Main Line and is 34.1 kilometers from the terminus of the line at Nishidai.

== Station layout ==
The station consists of two unnumbered ground-level side platforms connected by an underground passage. The station is unattended.

=== Platforms ===
station side	■ Main Line	for Takasago, Himeji and Sanyo-Aboshi
opposite side	■ Main Line	for Sanyo Akashi, Sannomiya and Osaka

== Adjacent stations ==
«	Service	»
Sanyo Electric Railway
Sanyo Electric Railway Main Line
Sanyo Limited Express: Does not stop at this station
Befu	Sanyo S Limited Express	Onoenomatsu
Befu	Sanyo Local	Onoenomatsu

== History ==
Hamanomiya Station opened on August 19, 1923.

== Passenger statistics ==
In fiscal 2018, the station was used by an average of 2540 passengers daily (boarding passengers only).

== Surrounding area ==
- Kakogawa City Hamamiya Kindergarten / Elementary School / Junior High School
- Kakogawa citizen pool
- Hamamiya Tenjin Shrine (Hamanomiya Park)
- Ikeda Kannon
- Kobe Steel Kakogawa Steel Works

== See also ==
- List of railway stations in Japan
