= Onoenomatsu Station =

Railway station in Hyogo Prefecture, Japan

Onoenomatsu Station 尾上の松駅
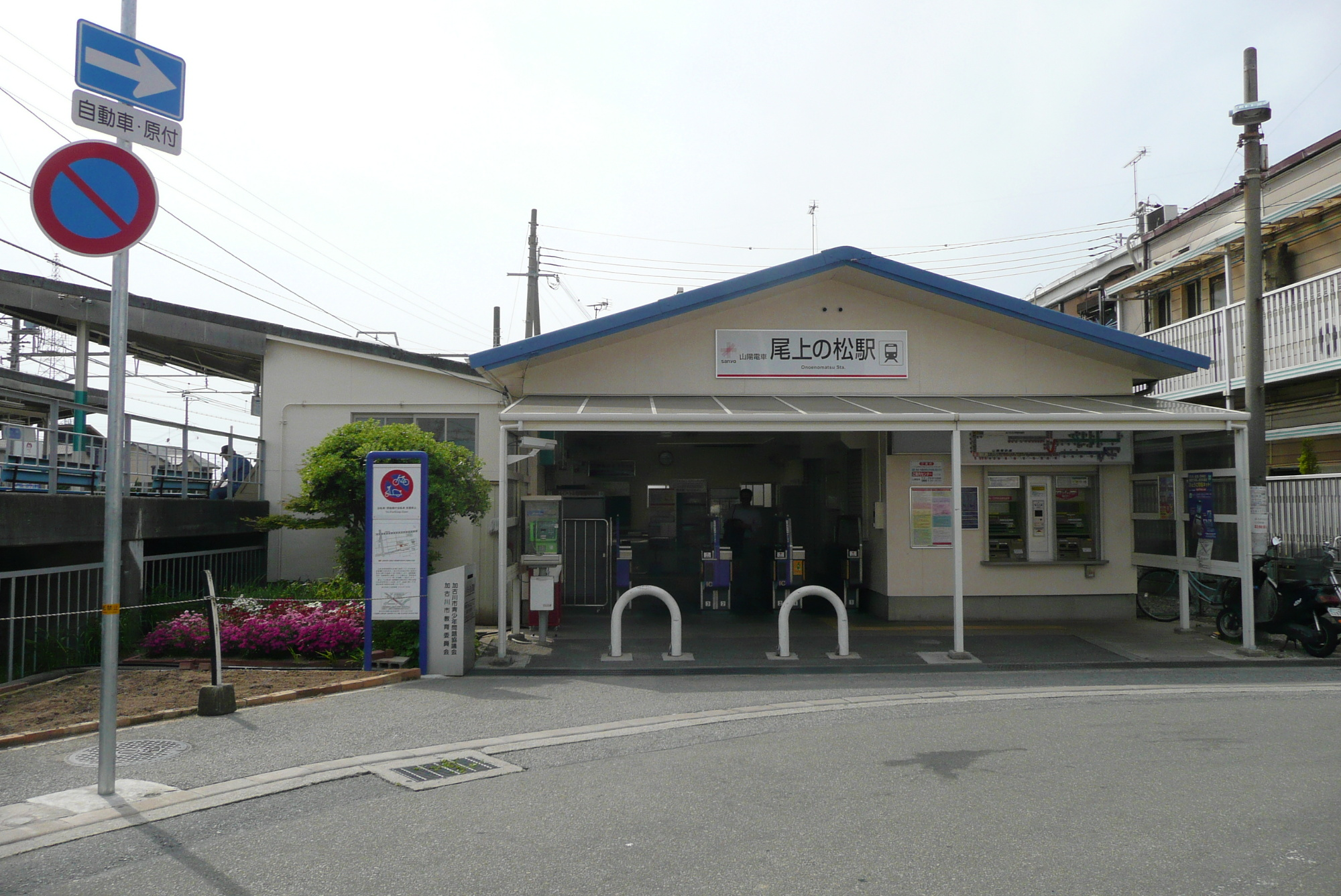
- Onoenomatsu Station, May 2008

General information
- Location: Imafuku Onoe-chō, Kakogawa-shi, Hyōgo-ken 675-0027; Japan
- Coordinates: 34.7488°N 134.8208°E
- Operator: Sanyo Electric Railway
- Line: ■ Main Line
- Distance: 35.5 km from Nishidai
- Platforms: 2 side platforms
- Connections

Other information
- Station code: SY30
- Website: Official website

History
- Opened: 19 August 1923

Passengers
- FY2019: 2167 (boarding only)
Location
- Location within Hyōgo Prefecture Location within Japan

Onoenomatsu Station (尾上の松駅, Onoenomatsu-eki) is a passenger railway station located in the city of Kakogawa, Hyōgo Prefecture, Japan, operated by the private Sanyo Electric Railway.

== Lines ==
Onoenomatsu Station is served by the Sanyo Electric Railway Main Line and is 35.5 kilometers from the terminus of the line at Nishidai.

== Station layout ==
The station consists of two unnumbered ground-level side platforms connected by an underground passage. The station is unattended.

=== Platforms ===
station side	■ Main Line	for Sanyo Akashi, Sannomiya and Osaka
opposite side	■ Main Line	for Takasago, Himeji and Sanyo-Aboshi

== Adjacent stations ==
«	Service	»
Sanyo Electric Railway
Sanyo Electric Railway Main Line
Sanyo Limited Express: Does not stop at this station
Hamanomiya	Sanyo S Limited Express	Takasago
Hamanomiya	Sanyo Local	Takasago

== History ==
Onoenomatsu Station opened on 19 August 1923.

== Passenger statistics ==
In fiscal 2018, the station was used by an average of 2167 passengers daily (boarding passengers only).

== Surrounding area ==
- Kakurin-ji Temple
- Onoe Shrine
- Kakogawa City Wakamiya Elementary School

== See also ==
- List of railway stations in Japan
