= Nishi-Eigashima Station =

Railway station in Akashi, Hyōgo Prefecture, Japan

Nishi-Eigashima Station 西江井ヶ島駅
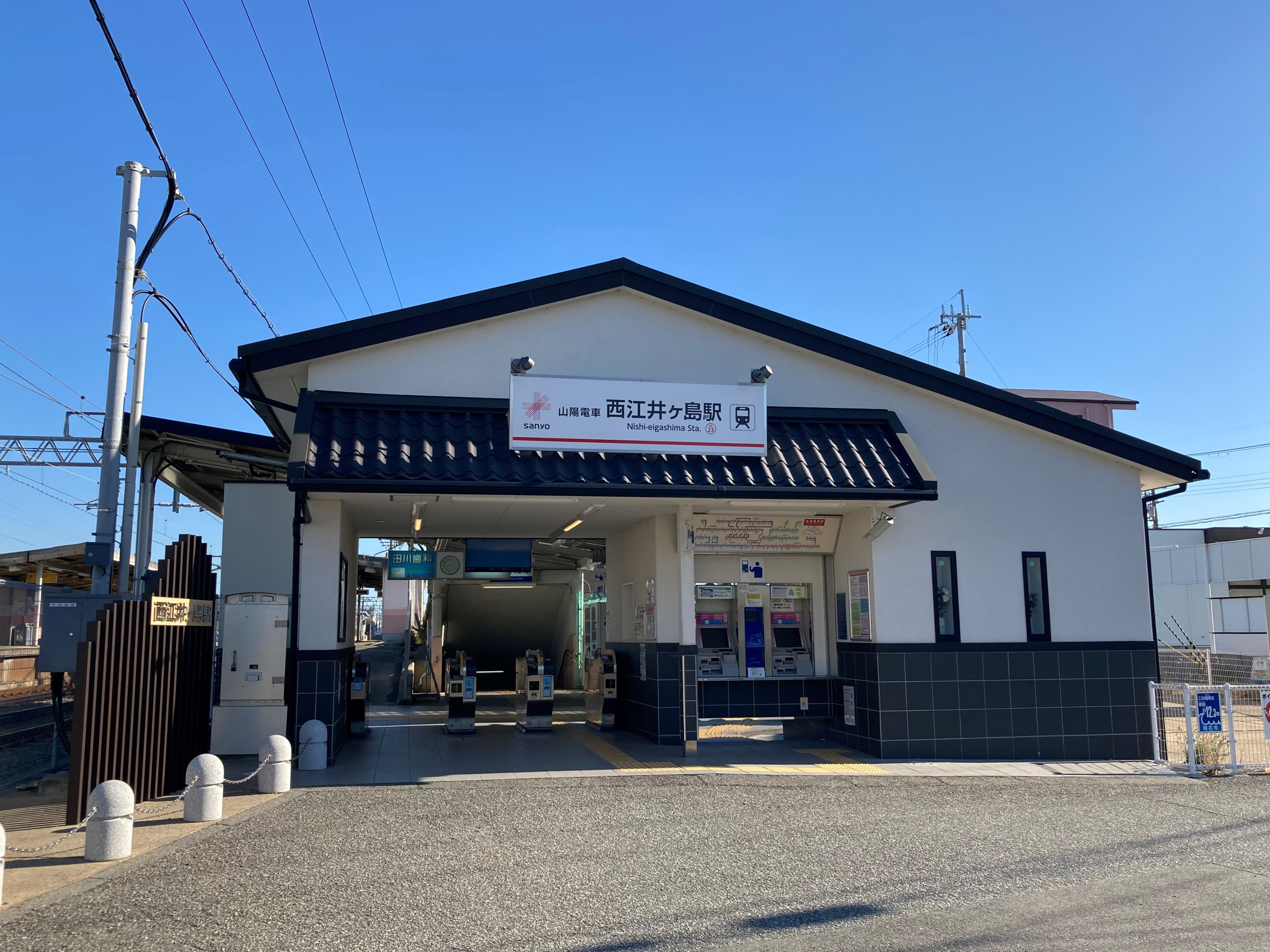
- Nishi-Eigashima Station, December 2023

General information
- Location: Nishijima Ōkubo-chō, Akashi-shi, Hyōgo-ken 674-0065; Japan
- Coordinates: 34.6858°N 134.9080°E
- Operator: Sanyo Electric Railway
- Line: ■ Main Line
- Distance: 24.9 km from Nishidai
- Platforms: 2 side platforms
- Connections

Other information
- Station code: SY23
- Website: Official website

History
- Opened: 19 August 1923
- Former names: Eigashima-Nishiguchi Station (to 1944)

Passengers
- FY2019: 3,535 (boarding only)
Location
- Location within Hyōgo Prefecture Location within Japan

Nishi-Eigashima Station (西江井ヶ島駅, Nishi-Eigashima-eki) is a passenger railway station located in the city of Akashi, Hyōgo Prefecture, Japan, operated by the private Sanyo Electric Railway.

== Lines ==
Nishi-Eigashima Station is served by the Sanyo Electric Railway Main Line and is 24.9 kilometers from the terminus of the line at Nishidai.

== Station layout ==
The station consists of two unnumbered elevated side platforms with the station building underneath.

=== Platforms ===
station side	■ Main Line	for Takasago, Himeji and Sanyo-Aboshi
opposite side	■ Main Line	for Akashi, Sannomiya and Osaka

== Adjacent stations ==
«	Service	»
Sanyo Electric Railway
Sanyo Electric Railway Main Line
Eigashima	Sanyo Local	Sanyo Uozumi
Sanyo S Limited Express: Does not stop at this station
Through Limited Express: Does not stop at this station

== History ==
Nishi-Eigashima Station opened on August 19, 1923 as Eigashima-Nishiguchi Station (江井ヶ島西口駅). It was renamed on April 1, 1944.

== Passenger statistics ==
In fiscal 2018, the station was used by an average of 3,535 passengers daily (boarding passengers only).

== Surrounding area ==
- Eigashima Shuzo
- Japan National Route 250

== See also ==
- List of railway stations in Japan
