= Ōkubo Station (Hyōgo) =

Railway station in Akashi, Hyōgo Prefecture, Japan

Ōkubo Station 大久保駅
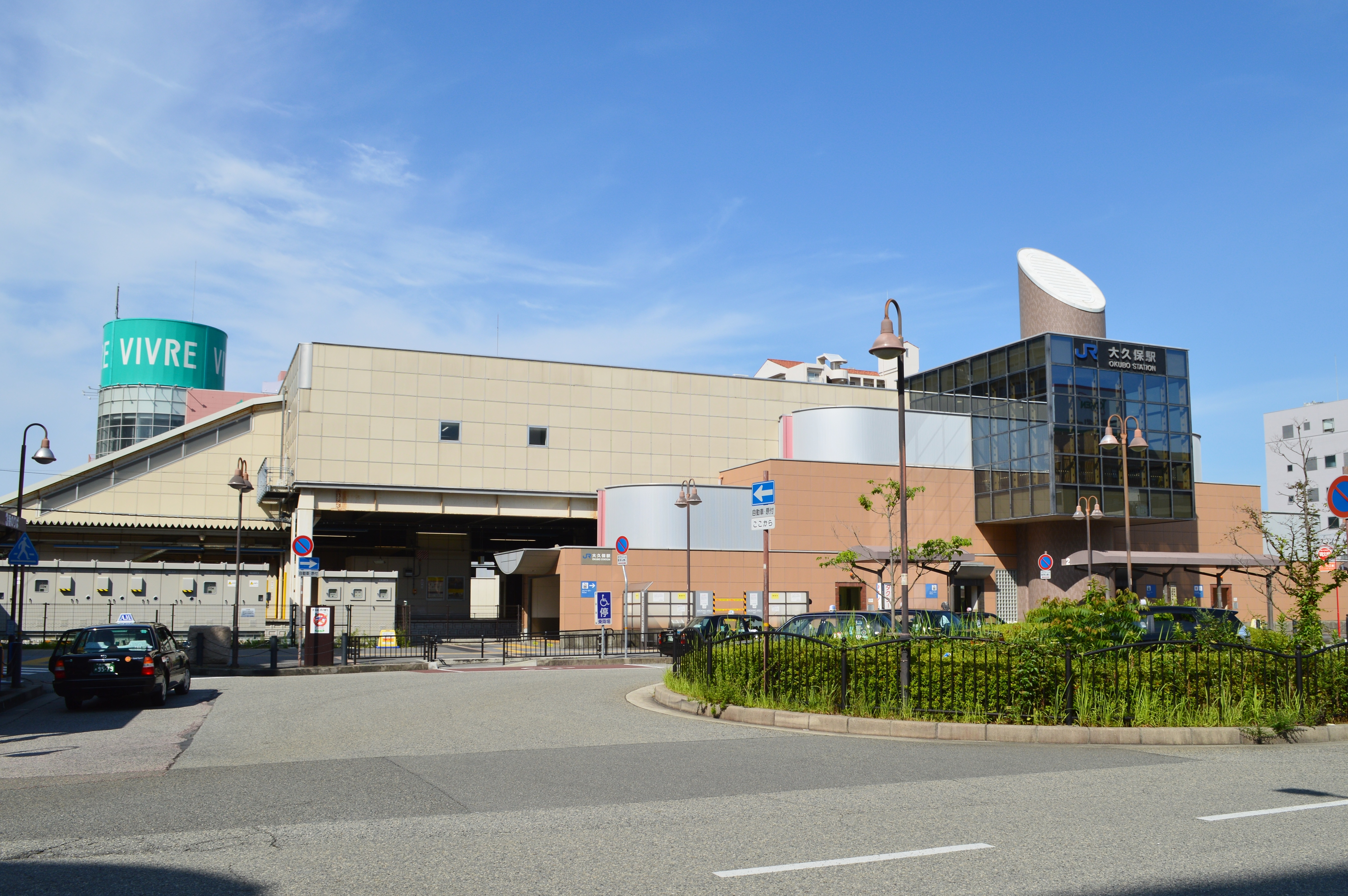
- Ōkubo Station, June 2020

General information
- Location: 20 Ōkubochō-Ōkubomachi, Akashi-shi, Hyōgo-ken 674-0067; Japan
- Coordinates: 34°40′56.25″N 134°56′19.88″E
- Owner: West Japan Railway Company
- Operator: West Japan Railway Company
- Line: San'yō Main Line
- Distance: 25.6 km (15.9 miles) from Kobe
- Platforms: 2 island platforms
- Connections: Bus stop

Construction
- Structure type: Ground level
- Accessible: Yes

Other information
- Status: Staffed (Midori no Madoguchi)
- Station code: JR-A75
- Website: Official website

History
- Opened: 23 December 1888

Passengers
- FY2019: 20,001 daily
Location
- Location within Hyōgo Prefecture Location within Japan

Ōkubo Station (大久保駅, Ōkubo-eki) is a passenger railway station located in the city of Akashi, Hyōgo Prefecture, Japan, operated by the West Japan Railway Company (JR West).

== Lines ==
Ōkubo Station is served by the JR San'yō Main Line, and is located 25.6 kilometers from the terminus of the line at Kobe and 58.7 kilometers from Osaka.

== Station layout ==
The station consists of two ground-level island platforms connected by an elevated station building, and a siding westbound track without a platform in the south of Track 4. The station has a Midori no Madoguchi staffed ticket office

=== Platforms ===
1, 2	■ San'yō Main Line	for Sannomiya and Osaka
3	■ San'yō Main Line	for Kakogawa and Himeji returning for Sannomiya and Osaka
4	■ San'yō Main Line	for Kakogawa and Himeji

== Adjacent stations ==
«	Service	»
JR West
Sanyō Main Line (JR Kobe Line)
Nishi-Akashi	Local trains Including Rapid Service (快速): Akashi - Takatsuki or Kyoto	Uozumi
Special Rapid Service: Does not stop at this station
Nishi-Akashi	Commuter Limited Express Rakuraku Harima	Kakogawa
Limited Express Super Hakuto: Does not stop at this station
Limited Express Super Hamakaze: Does not stop at this station

== History ==
Ōkubo Station opened on 23 December 1888. With the privatization of the Japan National Railways (JNR) on 1 April 1987, the station came under the aegis of the West Japan Railway Company.

Station numbering was introduced in March 2018 with Ōkubo being assigned station number JR-A75.

== Passenger statistics ==
In fiscal 2019, the station was used by an average of 20,001 passengers daily

== Surrounding area ==
- Okubo O's Town
- Akashi City Okubo Junior High School
- Akashi City Okubo Elementary School
- Akashi City Okubo Minami Elementary School

== See also ==
- List of railway stations in Japan
