= Uozumi Station =

Railway station in Akashi, Hyōgo Prefecture, Japan

Uozumi Station 魚住駅
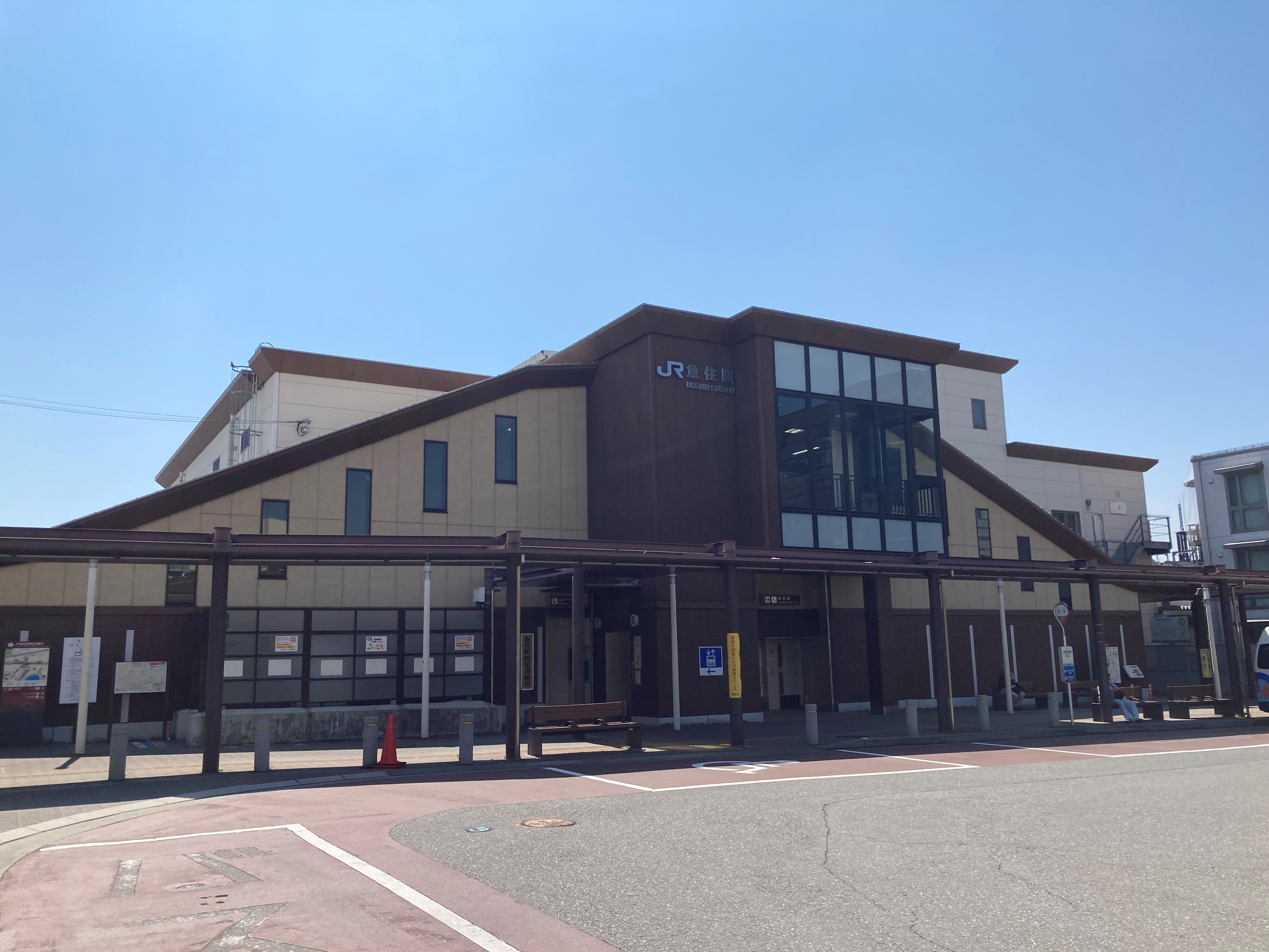
- Uozumi Station, August 2024

General information
- Location: 607-1 Nakao, Uozumi-chō, Akashi-shi, Hyōgo-ken; Japan
- Coordinates: 34.6963°N 134.9061°E
- Owner: West Japan Railway Company
- Operator: West Japan Railway Company
- Line: San'yō Main Line
- Distance: 29.1 km (18.1 miles) from Kobe
- Platforms: 2 side platforms
- Connections: Bus stop

Construction
- Structure type: Ground level
- Accessible: Yes

Other information
- Status: Staffed (Midori no Madoguchi)
- Station code: JR-A76
- Website: Official website

History
- Opened: 1 October 1961

Passengers
- FY2019: 11,540 daily
Location
- Location within Hyōgo Prefecture Location within Japan

Uozumi Station (魚住駅, Uozumi-eki) is a passenger railway station located in the city of Akashi, Hyōgo Prefecture, Japan, operated by the West Japan Railway Company (JR West).

== Lines ==
Uozumi Station is served by the JR San'yō Main Line, and is located 29.1 kilometers from the terminus of the line at Kobe and 62.2 kilometers from Osaka.

== Station layout ==
The station consists of two ground-level side platforms connected by an elevated station building. The station has a Midori no Madoguchi staffed ticket office

=== Platforms ===
1	■ San'yō Main Line	for Sannomiya and Osaka
2	■ San'yō Main Line	for Kakogawa and Himeji

== Adjacent stations ==
«	Service	»
JR West
Sanyō Main Line (JR Kobe Line)
Limited Express Super Hakuto: Does not stop at this station
Limited Express Hamakaze: Does not stop at this station
Commuter Limited Express Rakuraku Harima: Does not stop at this station
Special Rapid Service: Does not stop at this station
Ōkubo	Local including Rapid Service	Tsuchiyama

== History ==
Uozumi Station opened on 1 October 1961. With the privatization of the Japan National Railways (JNR) on 1 April 1987, the station came under the aegis of the West Japan Railway Company.

Station numbering was introduced in March 2018 with Uozumi being assigned station number JR-A76.

== Passenger statistics ==
In fiscal 2019, the station was used by an average of 11,540 passengers daily

== Surrounding area ==
- Sanyo Uozumi Station
- Akashi National College of Technology
- Hyogo Prefectural Akashi Shimizu High School
- Akashi Municipal Akashi Commercial High School

== See also ==
- List of railway stations in Japan
