= Akashi, Hyōgo =

City in Kansai region, Japan

Akashi 明石市
- Core city
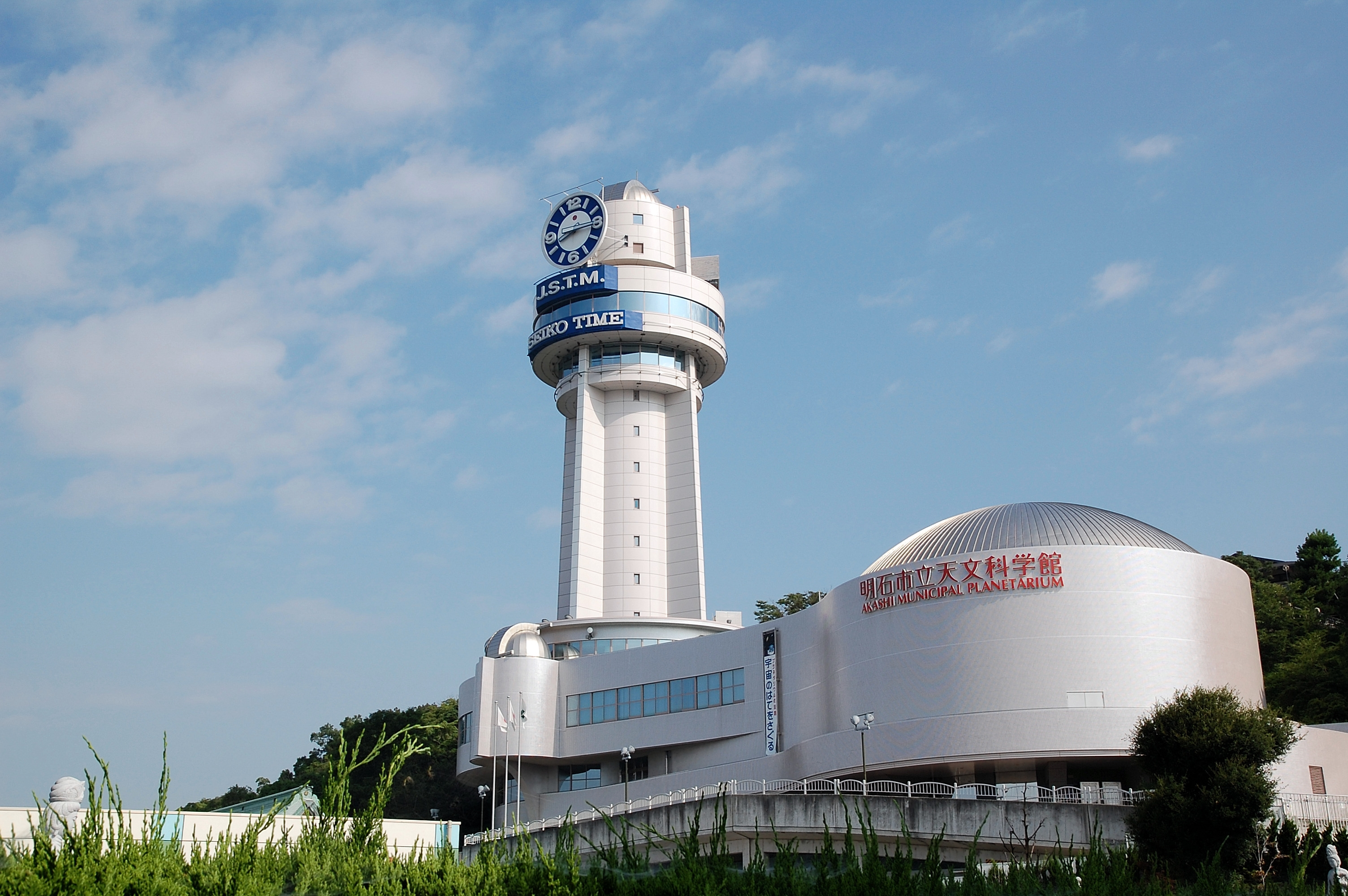

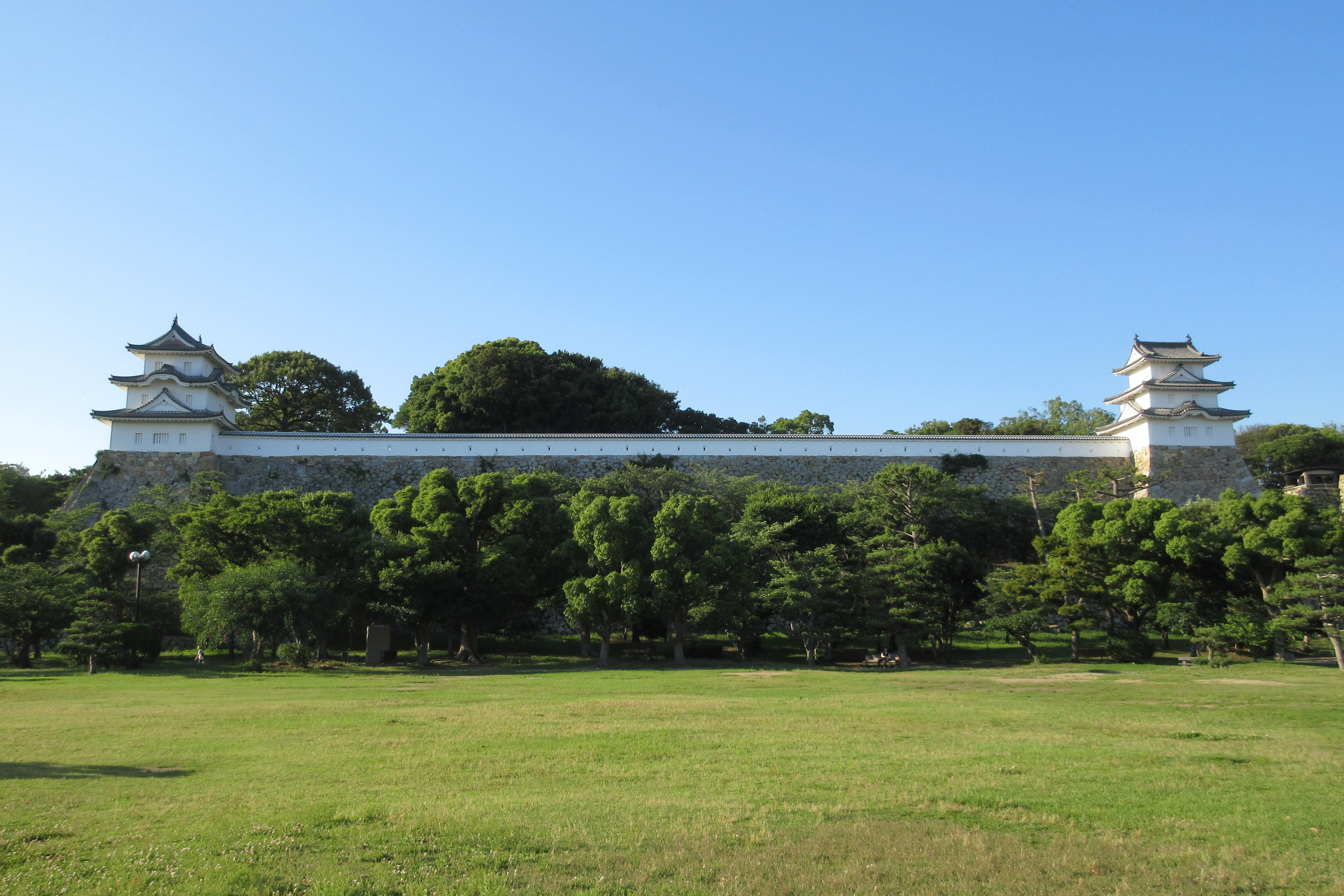

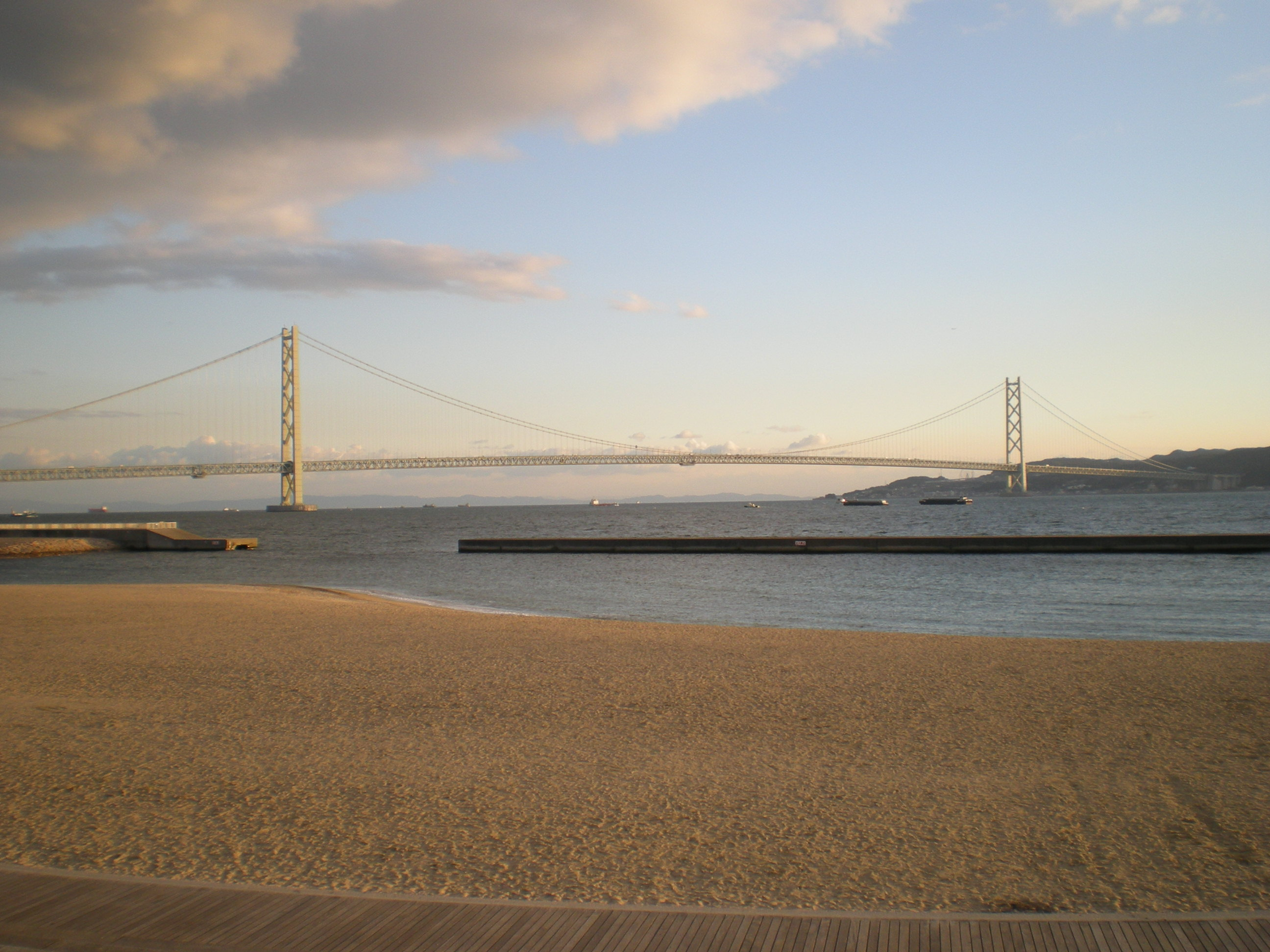

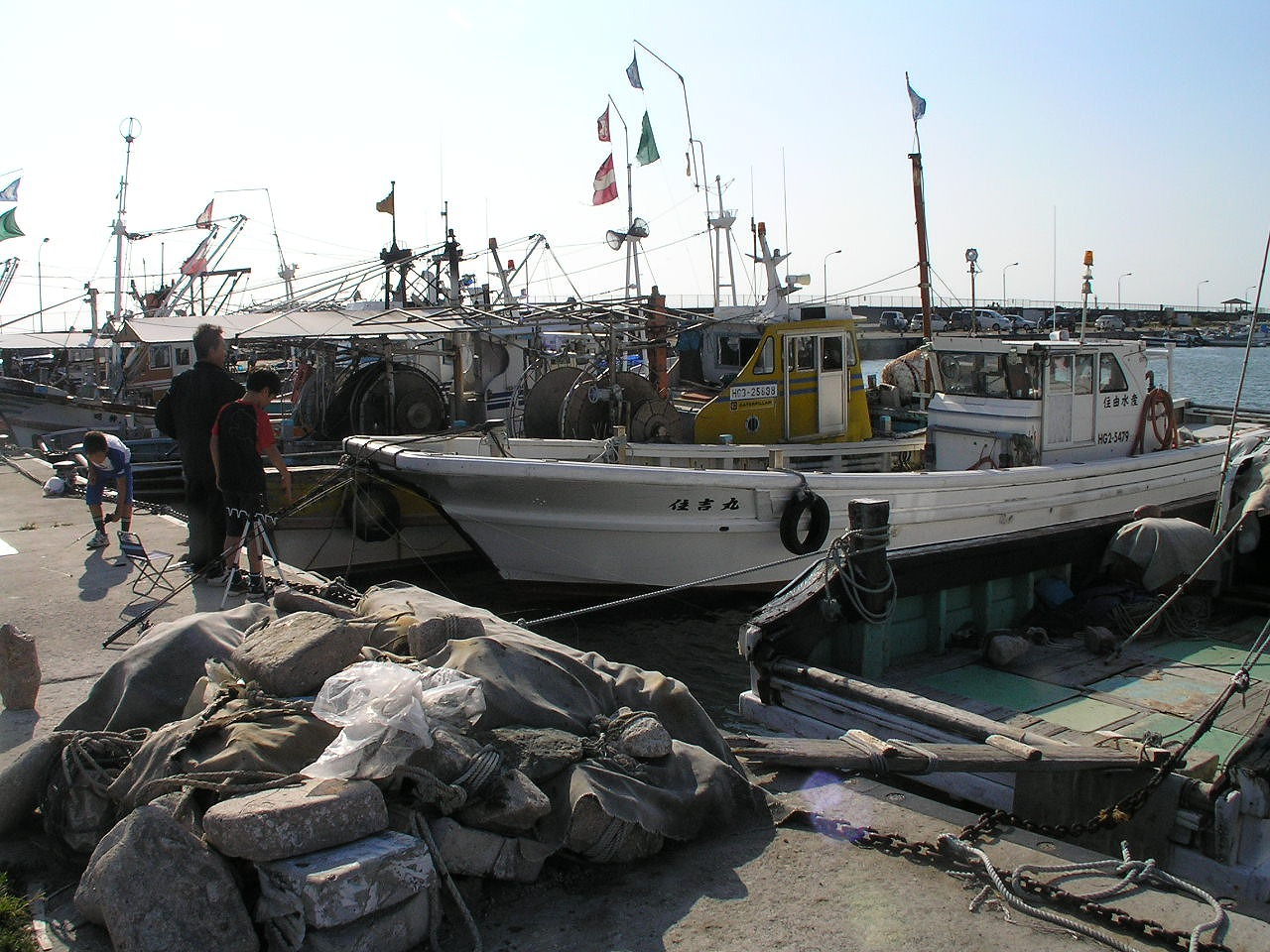
Akashi Planetarium
Akashi Castle	Okura beach
Uonotani Market	Hayashizaki fishing port
- Flag Emblem
- Interactive map of Akashi
- Location in Japan
- Coordinates: 34°39′N 135°0′E
- Country: Japan
- Region: Kansai
- Prefecture: Hyōgo

Government
  - Mayor: Satoko Marutani (from May 2023)

Area
  - Total: 49.42 km^{2} (19.08 sq mi)

Population (February 1, 2024)
  - Total: 305,925
  - Density: 6,190/km^{2} (16,030/sq mi)
- Time zone: UTC+09:00 (JST)
- City hall address: 1-5-1 Nakasaki, Akashi-shi, Hyōgo-ken 673-8686
- Climate: Cfa
- Website: Official website
- Symbols
- Flower: Chrysanthemums
- Tree: Sweet Osmanthus

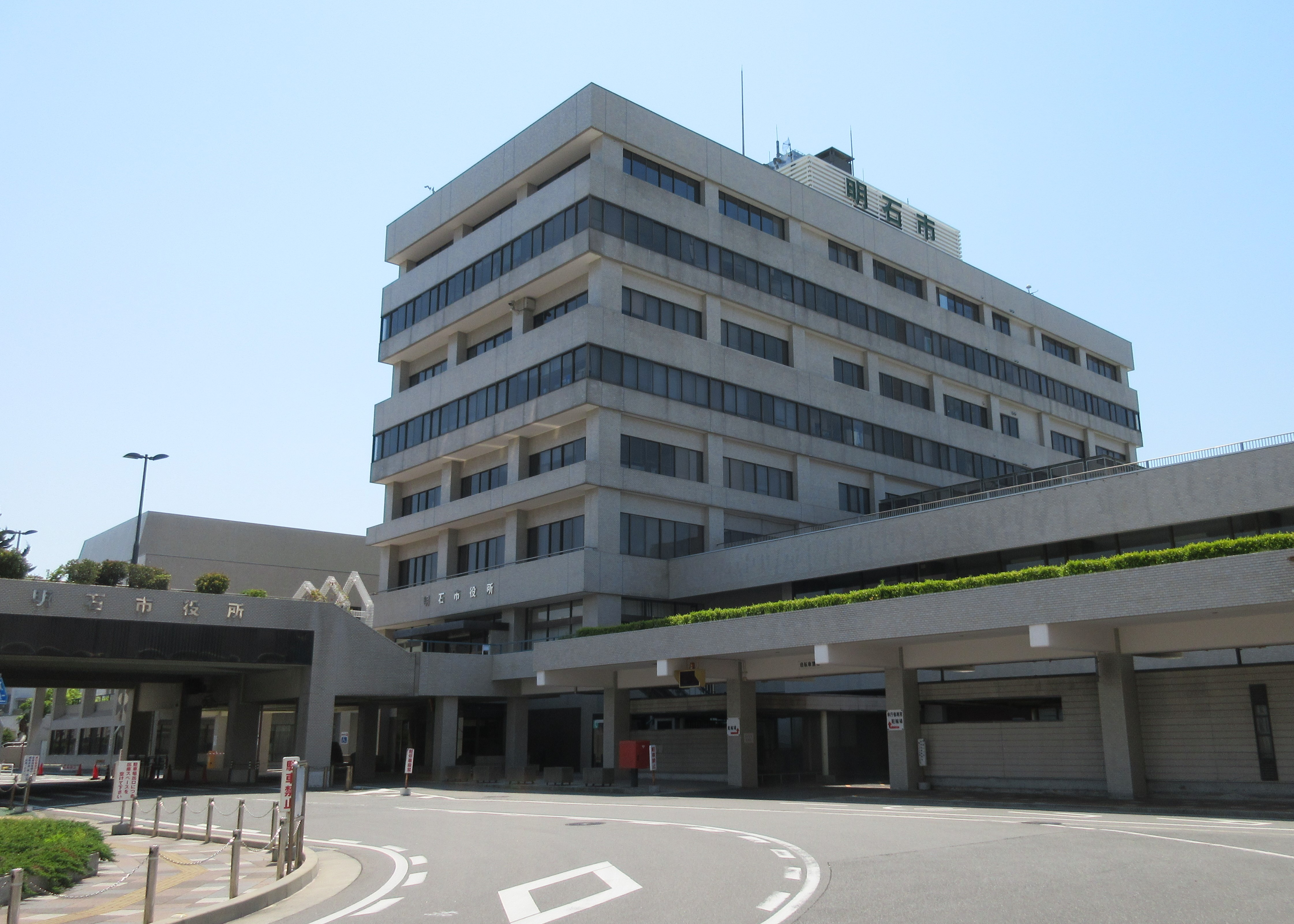
Akashi City Hall

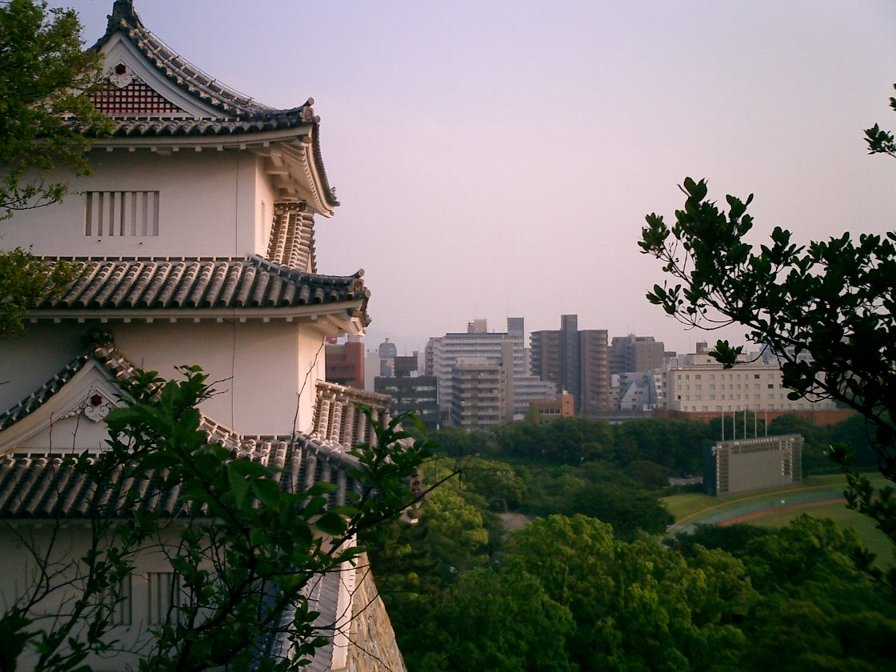
Akashi from Akashi Castle

Akashi (明石市, Akashi-shi; Japanese pronunciation: [ä́.kä̀.ɕì, ä̀.kä́.ɕí.ɕì]) is a city in southern Hyōgo Prefecture, Japan. As of 1 February 2024, the city had an estimated population of 305,925 in 137,288 households and a population density of 6,200 people per km^{2}. The total area of the city is 49.42 square kilometres (19.08 sq mi).

== Geography ==
Akashi is located in southern Hyōgo prefecture, and is a long and narrow municipality along the Seto Inland Sea. It is separated from Awaji Island by Harima Bay; however, the terminus of the Akashi Kaikyō Bridge, which connects Honshu to Awaji Island and to Shikoku, is not in Akashi but in Tarumi-ku, Kōbe. The 135th meridian east line that determines Japan Standard Time passes through the city.

=== Neighbouring municipalities ===
Hyōgo Prefecture

- Inami
- Harima
- Kakogawa
- Kōbe

=== Climate ===
Akashi has a humid subtropical climate (Köppen climate classification Cfa) with hot summers and cool to cold winters. Precipitation is significantly higher in summer than in winter, though on the whole lower than in most parts of Honshū, and there is no significant snowfall. The average annual temperature in Akashi is 15.9 °C (60.6 °F). The average annual rainfall is 1,156.6 mm (45.54 in) with September as the wettest month. The temperatures are highest on average in August, at around 27.7 °C (81.9 °F), and lowest in January, at around 5.2 °C (41.4 °F). The highest temperature ever recorded in Akashi was 37.2 °C (99.0 °F) on 13 August 2019; the coldest temperature ever recorded was −4.3 °C (24.3 °F) on 30 January 2003.

Climate data for Akashi (1992−2020 normals, extremes 1992−present)
Month	Jan	Feb	Mar	Apr	May	Jun	Jul	Aug	Sep	Oct	Nov	Dec	Year
Record high °C (°F)	16.5 (61.7)	18.1 (64.6)	22.1 (71.8)	27.4 (81.3)	29.4 (84.9)	33.4 (92.1)	36.3 (97.3)	37.2 (99.0)	34.9 (94.8)	30.7 (87.3)	25.2 (77.4)	22.4 (72.3)	37.2 (99.0)
Mean daily maximum °C (°F)	9.1 (48.4)	9.5 (49.1)	12.5 (54.5)	17.4 (63.3)	22.2 (72.0)	25.6 (78.1)	29.4 (84.9)	31.5 (88.7)	28.3 (82.9)	23.0 (73.4)	17.2 (63.0)	11.7 (53.1)	19.8 (67.6)
Daily mean °C (°F)	5.2 (41.4)	5.6 (42.1)	8.5 (47.3)	13.3 (55.9)	18.2 (64.8)	22.0 (71.6)	25.9 (78.6)	27.7 (81.9)	24.3 (75.7)	18.7 (65.7)	12.9 (55.2)	7.7 (45.9)	15.8 (60.5)
Mean daily minimum °C (°F)	1.5 (34.7)	1.7 (35.1)	4.4 (39.9)	9.3 (48.7)	14.6 (58.3)	19.0 (66.2)	23.4 (74.1)	24.9 (76.8)	20.8 (69.4)	14.6 (58.3)	8.7 (47.7)	3.7 (38.7)	12.2 (54.0)
Record low °C (°F)	−4.3 (24.3)	−4.2 (24.4)	−1.7 (28.9)	0.4 (32.7)	6.5 (43.7)	12.7 (54.9)	17.7 (63.9)	18.8 (65.8)	11.3 (52.3)	5.8 (42.4)	1.5 (34.7)	−2.2 (28.0)	−4.3 (24.3)
Average precipitation mm (inches)	35.1 (1.38)	50.7 (2.00)	83.6 (3.29)	89.5 (3.52)	115.4 (4.54)	150.5 (5.93)	152.3 (6.00)	86.2 (3.39)	162.6 (6.40)	118.1 (4.65)	59.2 (2.33)	48.7 (1.92)	1,156.6 (45.54)
Average precipitation days (≥ 1.0 mm)	5.0	6.5	8.8	9.0	9.0	10.7	9.7	5.9	9.2	7.6	5.9	5.8	93.1
Mean monthly sunshine hours	168.0	153.9	186.3	196.9	205.1	154.2	186.0	239.7	169.3	176.5	161.8	165.4	2,160.3
Source: Japan Meteorological Agency

=== Demographics ===
Historical population
Year	Pop.	±%
1920	58,087	—
1925	63,665	+9.6%
1930	66,872	+5.0%
1935	72,397	+8.3%
1940	84,835	+17.2%
1945	101,583	+19.7%
1950	112,011	+10.3%
1955	120,200	+7.3%
1960	129,780	+8.0%
1965	159,299	+22.7%
1970	206,532	+29.7%
1975	234,905	+13.7%
1980	254,869	+8.5%
1985	263,363	+3.3%
1990	270,722	+2.8%
1995	287,606	+6.2%
2000	293,117	+1.9%
2005	291,027	−0.7%
2010	290,993	−0.0%
2015	293,409	+0.8%
2020	303,601	+3.5%
Akashi population statistics

== History ==
Akashi is mentioned in a waka (five-line, 31-syllable poem) written by Kakinomoto no Hitomaro in the 7th century and it is the setting for one of the chapters of the 11th-century novel The Tale of Genji. It developed as the castle town of Akashi Domain during the Edo Period, from 1617 to 1871 due to its location dominating the San'yōdō highway connecting the Kinai region with western Japan. The famous swordsman Miyamoto Musashi is claimed to have laid out the design of the castle town. The town of Akashi was established on April 1, 1889 with the creation of the modern municipalities system. It was raised to city status on November 1, 1919. The city annexed the neighboring villages of Hayashizaki on February 11, 1942 and Okubo, Uozumi and Futami on January 10, 1951 to reach its present dimensions. A proposal to merge with the city of Kobe was rejected by a referendum in 1955. The city suffered from the Great Hanshin earthquake of 1995 with 4,839 houses were completely or partially destroyed and nine fatalities.

On July 21, 2001, 11 people were killed and 247 were injured during a crowd crush after a fireworks show. Five city officials were subsequently convicted of negligence in connection with the incident.

Akashi became a Core city on April 1, 2018 with increased local autonomy.

== Government ==
Akashi has a mayor-council form of government with a directly elected mayor and a unicameral city council of 30 members. Akashi contributes four members to the Hyogo Prefectural Assembly. In terms of national politics, the city is part of Hyōgo 9th district of the lower house of the Diet of Japan.

== Economy ==
Akashi is located within the Hanshin Industrial Area and Harima Seaside Industrial Area and has succeeded in attracting many companies to its Futami Seaside Industrial Park. The city has long been noted for aviation-related instrumentation manufacturers and electronic component manufacturers. Yamato Scale, a leading global manufacturer of commercial weighing and packaging equipment, is headquartered in the city. Due to its transportation connections and location, numerous bedroom communities have developed for commuters to Kobe and Osaka, which is estimated to exceed 30% of the working population. The city has also been noted since the Edo Period for its production of sake.

== Education ==
=== Elementary and Junior High Schools ===
Akashi has 28 municipal elementary schools and 13 municipal junior high schools. School attendance boundaries are determined by the Akashi City Board of Education. However, Takaoka-higashi Elementary, Takaoka-nishi Elementary, and Takaoka Middle School operate under a special open-enrollment policy. Students from anywhere in the city can attend these schools if they complete the required application process (though, as of 2022, new applications are only accepted for incoming first graders).

Akashi Municipal Elementary and Junior High Schools
Elementary School	Junior High
Matsugaoka	Asagiri
Asagiri	Asagiri
Hitomaru	Ōkura
Nakazaki	Ōkura
Akashi	Kinjō
Taikan	Kinugawa
Ōji	Kinugawa
Hayashi	Kinugawa
Toba	Nonoike
Wasaka	Nonoike
Sawaike	Nonoike
Fujie	Bōkai
Hanazono	Bōkai
Kizaki	Bōkai
Taniyagi	Ōkubo
Ōkubo-minami	Ōkubo
Ōkubo	Ōkubo / Ōkubo-kita
Yamate	Ōkubo-kita
Takaoka-higashi	Takaoka
Takaoka-nishi	Takaoka
Eigashima	Eigashima
Uozumi	Uozumi-higashi
Nishikigaoka	Uozumi-higashi
Shimizu	Uozumi
Kinpo	Uozumi
Futami	Futami
Futami-kita	Futami
Futami-nishi	Futami

There is also one national elementary school, Kobe University Elementary School (神戸大学附属小学校).

=== High Schools ===
One public high school is operated by the city government and seven public high schools are operated by the Hyōgo Prefectural Board of Education.

Public High Schools in Akashi
Operator	High School
Akashi City	Akashi Commercial
Hyōgo Prefecture	Akashi Kita
Hyōgo Prefecture	Akashi Jōsai
Hyōgo Prefecture	Akashi
Hyōgo Prefecture	Akashi Nishi
Hyōgo Prefecture	Akashi Shimizu
Hyōgo Prefecture	Akashi Minami
Hyōgo Prefecture	Kinjō (Part-time)

=== Higher Education/Other ===
The city operates one special education school for students with disabilities, Akashi Municipal Special Education School (明石市立明石養護学校). The nursing school of University of Hyogo is located in Akashi.

The city also has the National Institute of Technology Akashi College (NITAC) (国立明石工業高等専門学校).

The city once had a North Korean school, Akashi Korean Elementary School (明石朝鮮初級学校), and Akashi Junior College (明石短期大学).

== Transportation ==
=== Railway ===
JR West – San'yō Shinkansen

- Nishi-Akashi

JR West – San'yō Main Line (JR Kobe Line)

- Asagiri - Akashi - Nishi-Akashi - Ōkubo - Uozumi

Sanyo Electric Railway - Main Line

- Ōkuradani - Hitomarumae - Sanyo Akashi - Nishi-Shimmachi - Hayashisaki-Matsuekaigan - Fujie - Nakayagi - Eigashima - Nishi-Eigashima - Sanyo Uozumi - Higashi-Futami - Nishi-Futami

=== Highways ===
- Daini-Shinmei Road
- National Route 2 (Kobe, Okayama, Hiroshima, Shimonoseki)
- National Route 28 (Kobe, Tokushima)
- National Route 175 (Maizuru)
- National Route 250 (Kobe, Okayama)
- National Route 427 (Maizuru)
- National Route 250 (Nishiwaki, Asago)

=== Ferries ===
- Akashi Awaji Ferry and Awaji Jenova Line to Awaji Island

== Sister cities ==
Akashi is twinned with:

- Vallejo, California, United States, sister city since 1968
- Wuxi, China, friendship city since 1981

== Local attractions ==
- Akashi Castle, National Historic Site
- Akashi Municipal Planetarium, which stands on the meridian of 135 degrees east longitude, which is used to determine Japan Standard Time.
- Akashi Park Stadium is a track and field stadium that can hold 20,000 spectators.
- Kakinomoto Shrine
- Uonotana (Uo-no-Tana, 魚の棚, literally "fish-shelf"), a market where local fishermen display an array of fresh seafood caught in the Akashi Strait.
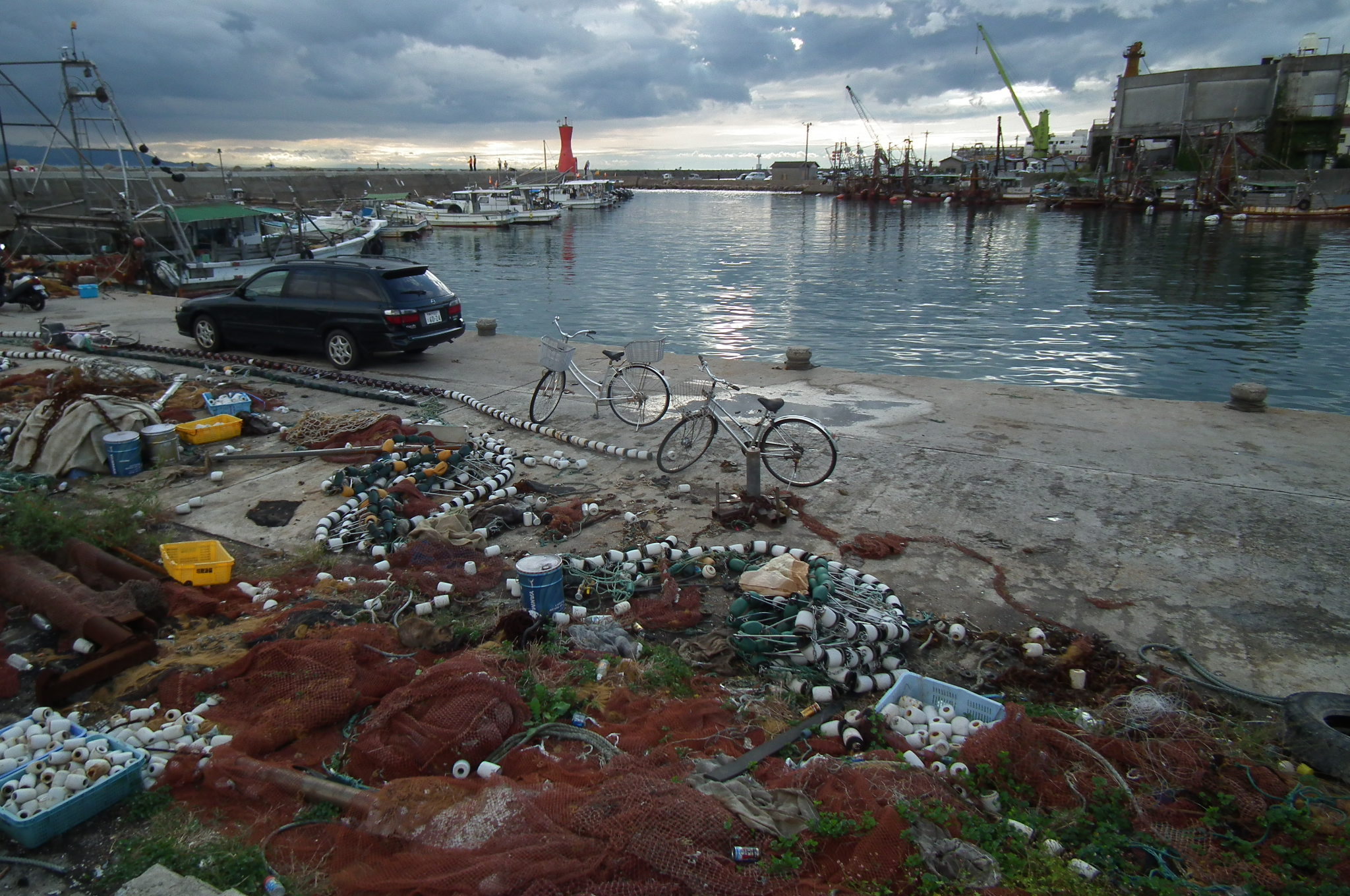
Port of Akashi

Sanyo Akashi Station

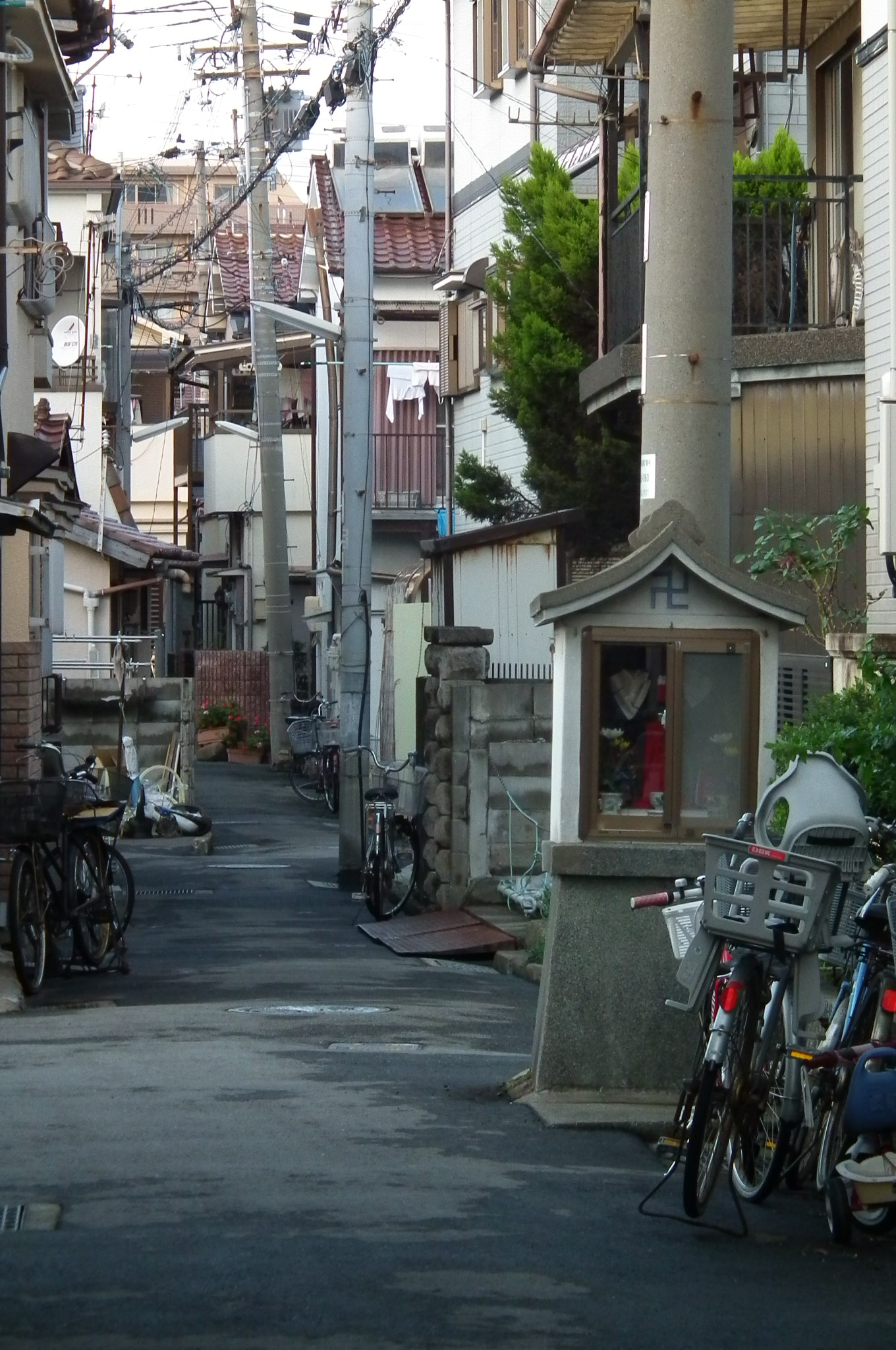
Old town area

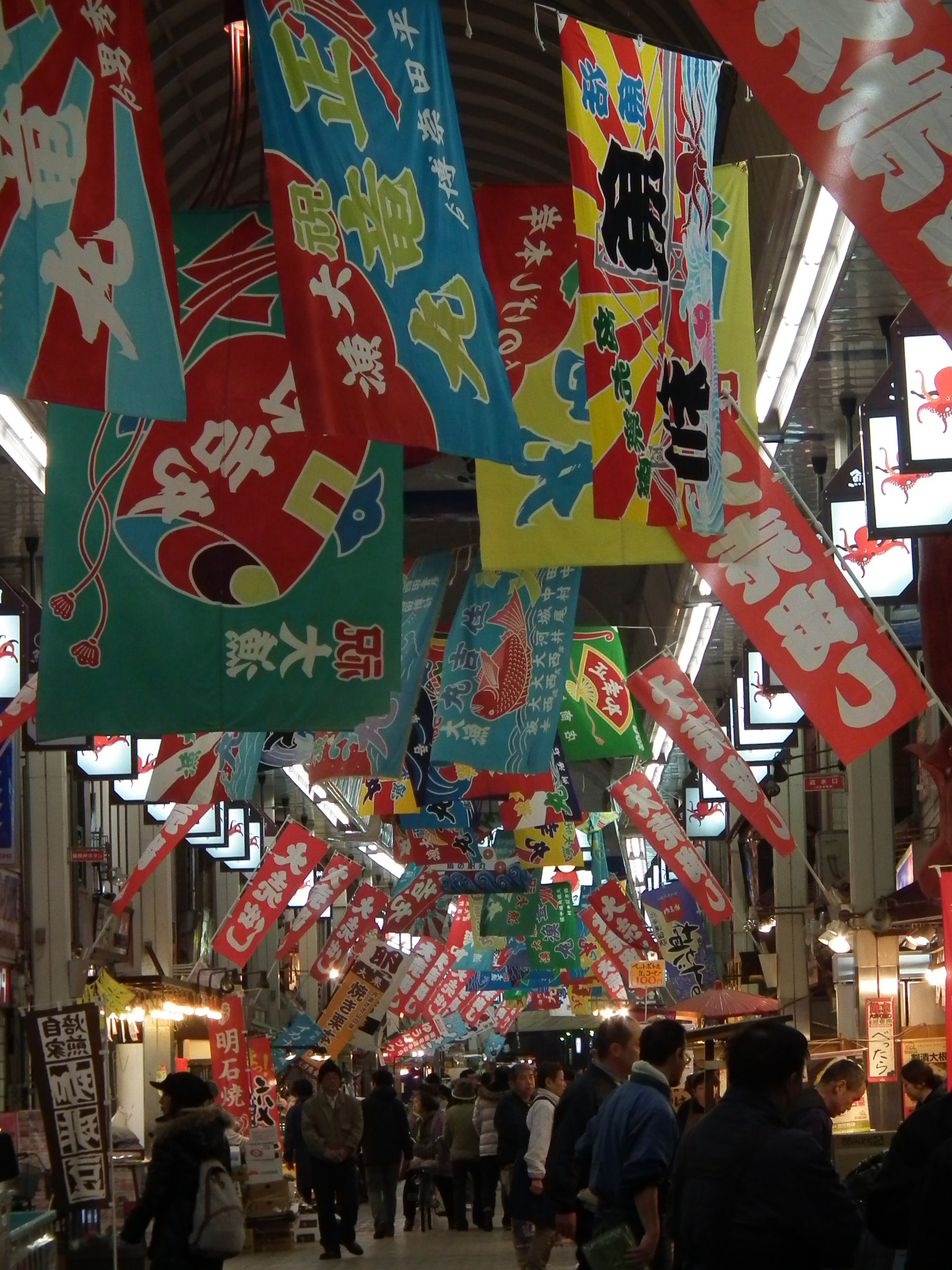
Uontana

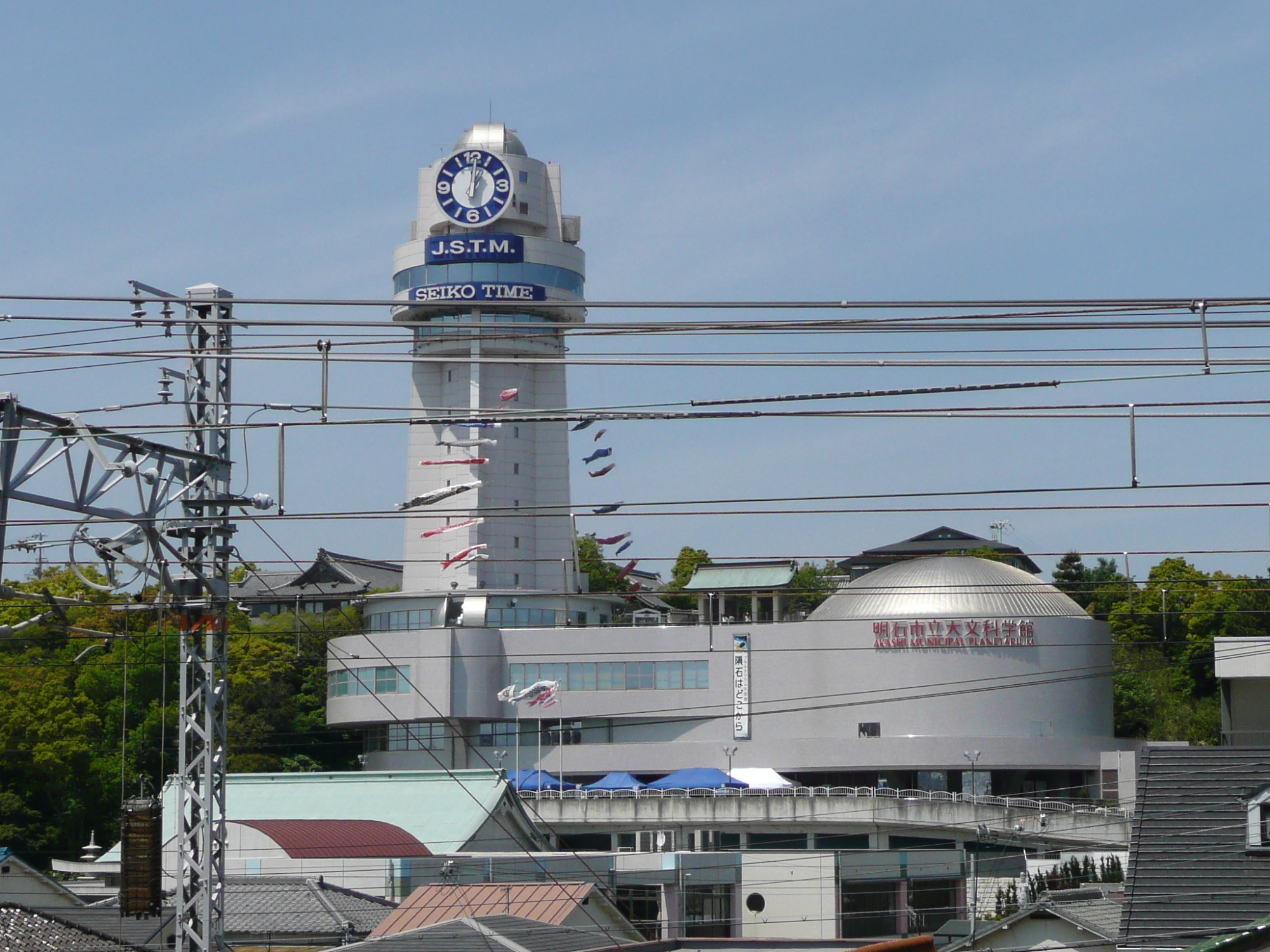
Akashi Municipal Planetarium

== Culture ==
Akashi is known for Akashiyaki, a kind of takoyaki particular to the region. Small pieces of octopus (tako) are placed inside a ball-shaped mold containing a mixture of flour and eggs, and this is then fried. Akashiyaki is often eaten by dipping in a thin soup. People who live in Akashi call it "tamagoyaki"(tamago, 玉子 or 卵, literally "egg").

== Notable people from Akashi ==
- Yumi Kokamo, long-distance runner
- Mami Kingetsu, voice actress
- Airi Taira, actress
- Yuma Nakakita, singer from Japanese Boy group &TEAM
