= Eigashima Station =

Railway station in Akashi, Hyōgo Prefecture, Japan

Eigashima Station 江井ヶ島駅
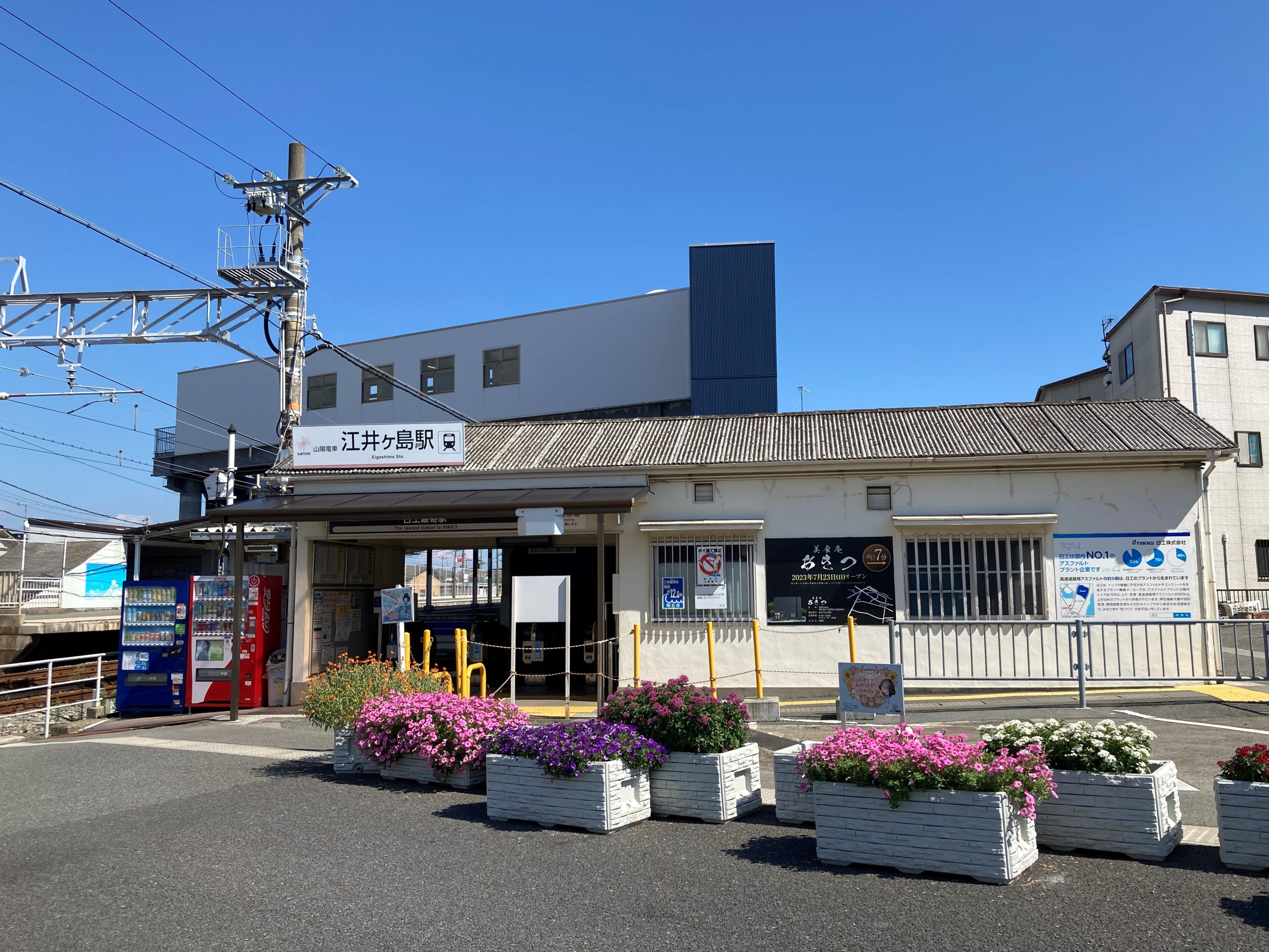
- Eigashima Station, September 2024

General information
- Location: Kanagasaki Ōkubo-chō, Akashi-shi, Hyōgo-ken 674-0064; Japan
- Coordinates: 34.6791°N 134.9201°E
- Operator: Sanyo Electric Railway
- Line: ■ Main Line
- Distance: 23.5 km from Nishidai
- Platforms: 2 side platforms
- Connections

Other information
- Station code: SY22
- Website: Official website

History
- Opened: 19 August 1923

Passengers
- FY2019: 2427 (boarding only)
Location
- Location within Hyōgo Prefecture Location within Japan

Eigashima Station (江井ヶ島駅, Eigashima-eki) is a passenger railway station located in the city of Akashi, Hyōgo Prefecture, Japan, operated by the private Sanyo Electric Railway.

== Lines ==
Eigashima Station is served by the Sanyo Electric Railway Main Line and is 23.5 kilometers from the terminus of the line at Nishidai.

== Station layout ==
The station consists of two unnumbered elevated side platforms with the station building underneath.

=== Platforms ===
station side	■ Main Line	for Takasago, Himeji and Sanyo-Aboshi
opposite side	■ Main Line	for Akashi, Sannomiya and Osaka

== Adjacent stations ==
«	Service	»
Sanyo Electric Railway
Sanyo Electric Railway Main Line
Nakayagi	Local	Nishi-Eigashima
Sanyo S Limited Express: Does not stop at this station
Through Limited Express: Does not stop at this station

== History ==
Eigashima Station opened on August 19, 1923.

== Passenger statistics ==
In fiscal 2018, the station was used by an average of 2427 passengers daily (boarding passengers only).

== Surrounding area ==
- Eigashima fishing port
- Akashi City Eigashima Elementary School

== See also ==
- List of railway stations in Japan
