= Harimachō Station =

Railway station in Harima, Hyōgo Prefecture, Japan

Harimachō Station 播磨町駅
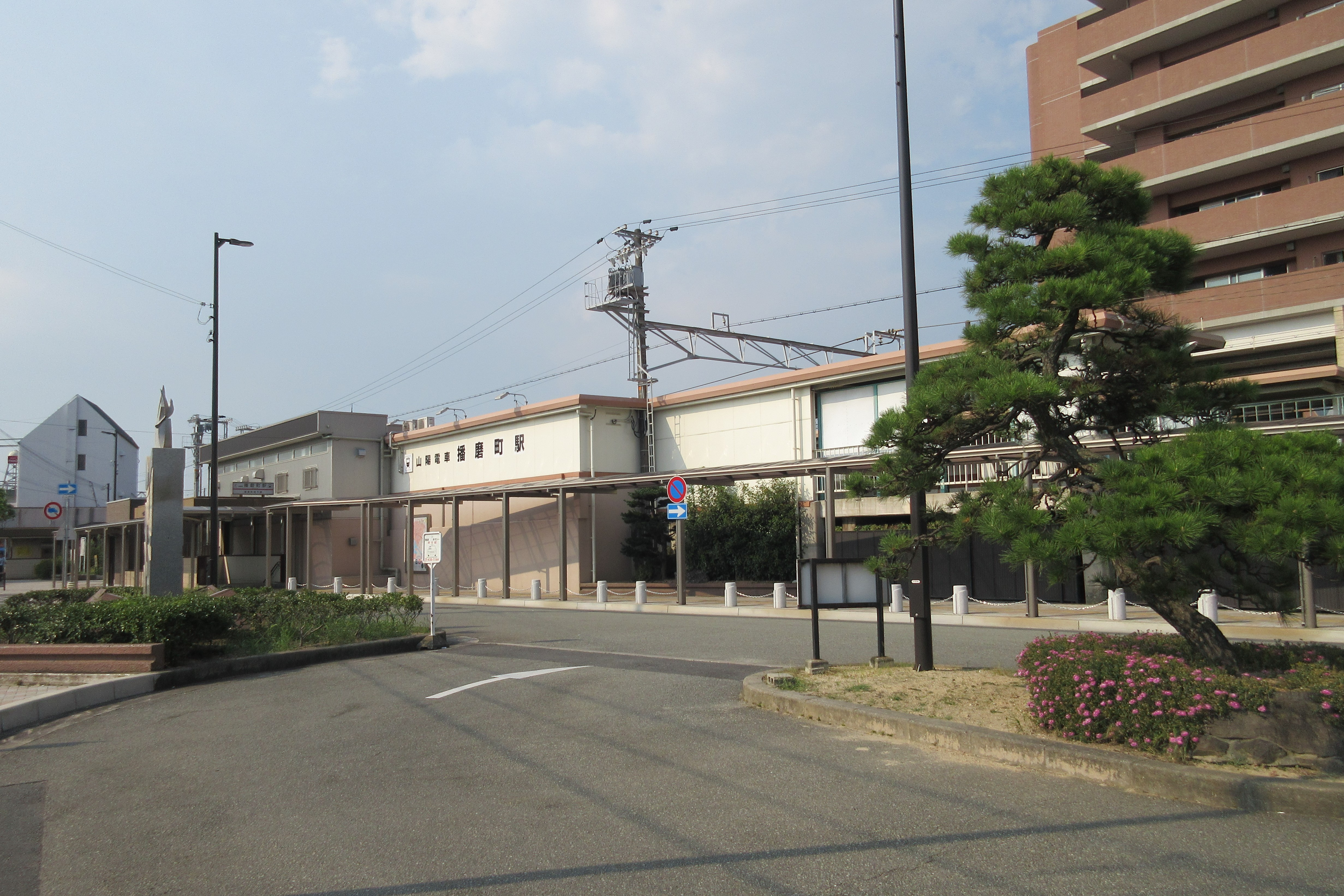
- Harimachō Station, August 2016

General information
- Location: 3-10 Minaminozoe, Harima-chō, Kako-gun, Hyōgo-ken 675-0150; Japan
- Coordinates: 34.7164°N 134.8682°E
- Operator: Sanyo Electric Railway
- Line: ■ Main Line
- Distance: 29.9 km from Nishidai
- Platforms: 2 side platforms
- Connections

Other information
- Station code: SY27
- Website: Official website

History
- Opened: 19 August 1923
- Former names: Honjō (until 1991)

Passengers
- FY2019: 2595 (boarding only)
Location
- Location within Hyōgo Prefecture Location within Japan

Harimachō Station (播磨町駅, Harimachō-eki) is a passenger railway station located in the town of Harima, Hyōgo Prefecture, Japan, operated by the private Sanyo Electric Railway.

== Lines ==
Harimachō Station is served by the Sanyo Electric Railway Main Line and is 29.9 kilometers from the terminus of the line at Nishidai.

== Station layout ==
The station consists of two unnumbered elevated side platforms with the station building underneath.

=== Platforms ===
south-bound	■ Main Line	for Takasago, Himeji and Sanyo-Aboshi
north-bound	■ Main Line	for Akashi, Sannomiya and Osaka

== Adjacent stations ==
«	Service	»
Sanyo Electric Railway
Sanyo Electric Railway Main Line
Sanyo Limited Express: Does not stop at this station
Nishi-Futami	Sanyo S Limited Express	Befu
Nishi-Futami	Sanyo Local	Befu

== History ==
Harimachō Station opened on August 19, 1923 as Honjō Station (本荘駅). It was renamed on April 7, 1991.

== Passenger statistics ==
In fiscal 2018, the station was used by an average of 2,595 passengers daily (boarding passengers only).

== Surrounding area ==
- Harima Town Hall
- Hyogo Prefectural Archaeological Museum
- Harima Onaka Ancient Village

== See also ==
- List of railway stations in Japan
