= Nishi-Futami Station =

Railway station in Akashi, Hyōgo Prefecture, Japan

Nishi-Futami Station 西二見駅
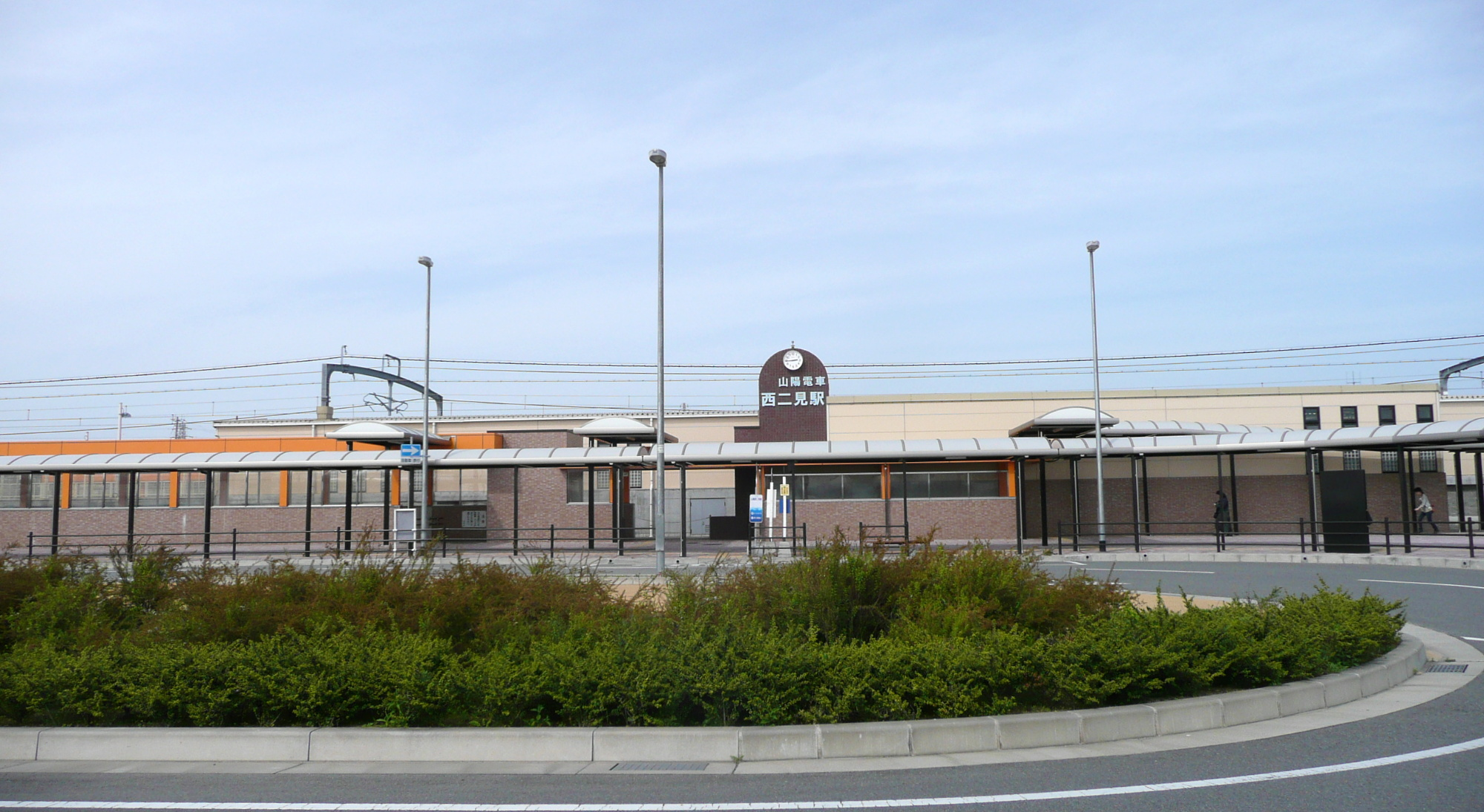
- Nishi-Futami Station south exit, May 2008

General information
- Location: 1481-2 Nishifutami, Futami-chō, Akashi-shi, Hyōgo-ken 674-0095; Japan
- Coordinates: 34.7072°N 134.8767°E
- Operator: Sanyo Electric Railway
- Line: ■ Main Line
- Distance: 28.6 km from Nishidai
- Platforms: 2 side platforms
- Connections

Other information
- Station code: SY26
- Website: Official website

History
- Opened: 21 August 2004

Passengers
- FY2019: 2934 (boarding only)
Location
- Location within Hyōgo Prefecture Location within Japan

Nishi-Futami Station (西二見駅, Nishi-Futami-eki) is a passenger railway station located in the city of Akashi, Hyōgo Prefecture, Japan, operated by the private Sanyo Electric Railway.

== Lines ==
Nishi-Futami Station is served by the Sanyo Electric Railway Main Line and is 28.6 kilometers from the terminus of the line at Nishidai.

== Station layout ==
The station consists of two unnumbered elevated side platforms with the station building underneath.

=== Platforms ===
south-bound	■ Main Line	for Takasago, Himeji and Sanyo-Aboshi
north-bound	■ Main Line	for Akashi, Sannomiya and Osaka

== Adjacent stations ==
«	Service	»
Sanyo Electric Railway
Sanyo Electric Railway Main Line
Higashi-Futami	Local	Harimachō
Higashi-Futami	S Limited Express	Harimachō
Through Limited Express: Does not stop at this station

== History ==
Nishi-Futami Station opened on August 21, 2004.

== Passenger statistics ==
In fiscal 2018, the station was used by an average of 2,934 passengers daily (boarding passengers only).

== Surrounding area ==
- Akashi City Western Cultural Center
- Nishifutami Community Center
- Akashi City Kaminishi Welfare Hall
- Futami Central Park

== See also ==
- List of railway stations in Japan
