= Befu Station (Hyōgo) =

Railway station in Kakogawa, Hyōgo Prefecture, Japan

Befu Station 別府駅
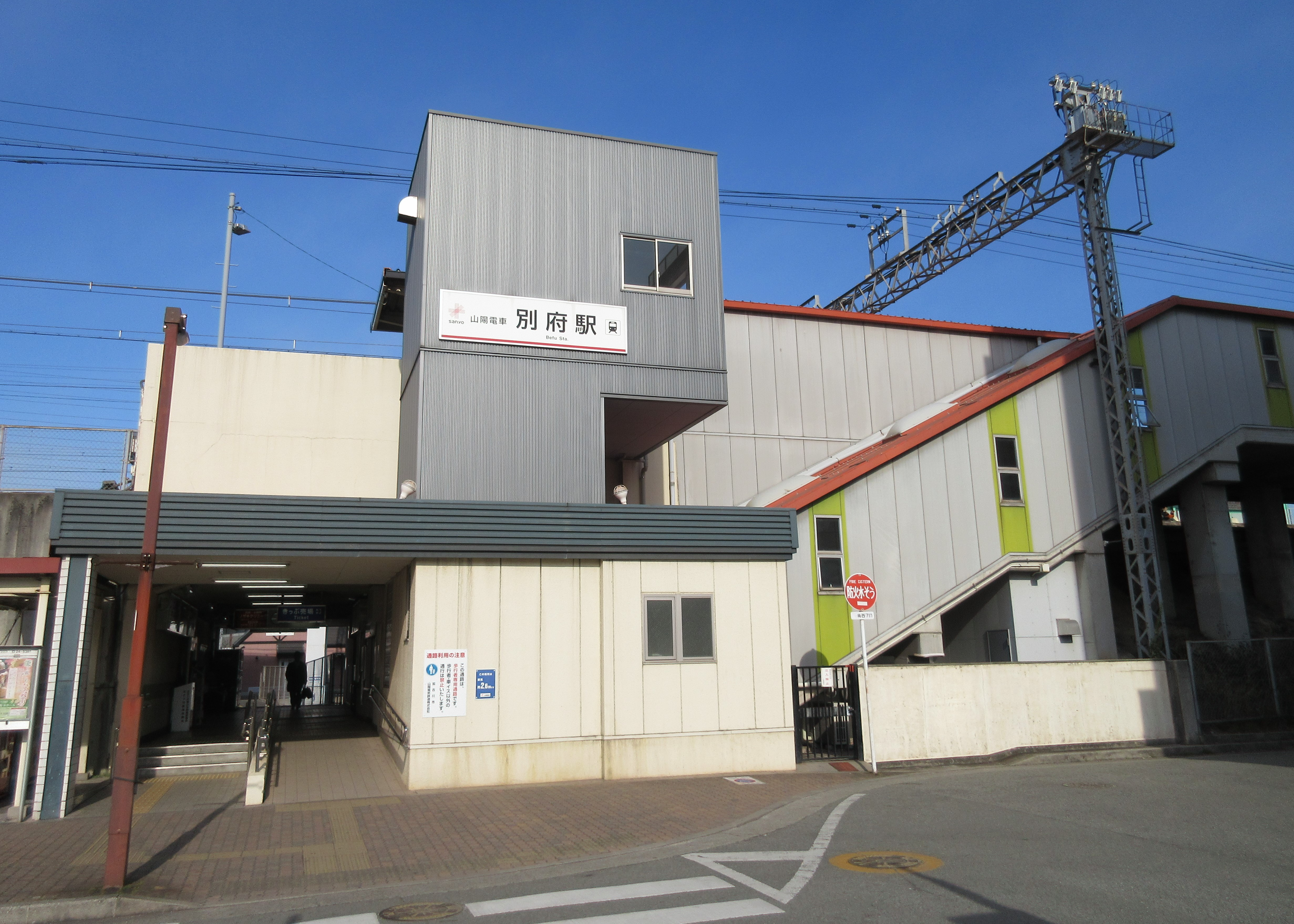
- Befu Station south exit, February 2018

General information
- Location: 1481-2 Nishifutami, Futami-chō, Kakogawa-shi, Hyōgo-ken 674-0095; Japan
- Coordinates: 34°43′49″N 134°51′02″E
- Operator: Sanyo Electric Railway
- Line: ■ Main Line
- Distance: 32.3 km from Nishidai
- Platforms: 2 side platforms
- Connections

Other information
- Station code: SY28
- Website: Official website

History
- Opened: 19 August 1923
- Former names: Befu-kitaguchi (to 1944); Dentetstu-Befu (to 1991)

Passengers
- FY2019: 4784 (boarding only)
Location
- Location within Hyōgo Prefecture Location within Japan

Befu Station (別府駅, Befu-eki) is a passenger railway station located in the city of Kakogawa, Hyōgo Prefecture, Japan, operated by the private Sanyo Electric Railway.

== Lines ==
Befu Station is served by the Sanyo Electric Railway Main Line and is 32.2 kilometers from the terminus of the line at Nishidai.

== Station layout ==
The station consists of two unnumbered ground-level side platforms connected by an underground passage. The station is unattended.

=== Platforms ===
south-bound	■ Main Line	for Takasago, Himeji and Sanyo-Aboshi
north-bound	■ Main Line	for Sanyo Akashi, Sannomiya and Osaka

== Adjacent stations ==
«	Service	»
Sanyo Electric Railway
Sanyo Electric Railway Main Line
Higashi-Futami	Limited Express	Takasago
Harimachō	Sanyo S Limited Express	Hamanomiya
Harimachō	Sanyo Local	Hamanomiya

== History ==
Befu Station opened on August 19, 1923 as Befu-kitaguchi Station (別府北口駅). It was renamed Dentetsu Befu Station (電鉄別府駅) on April 1, 1944 and renamed to its present name on April 7, 1991.

== Passenger statistics ==
In fiscal 2018, the station was used by an average of 4,784 passengers daily (boarding passengers only).

In 2025, Befu was made a Limited Express stop with the February 2025 timetable change.

== Surrounding area ==
- Kakogawa City Marine Culture Center
- Beppu Port

== See also ==
- List of railway stations in Japan
