= Higashi-Futami Station =

Railway station in Akashi, Hyōgo Prefecture, Japan

Higashi-Futami Station 東二見駅
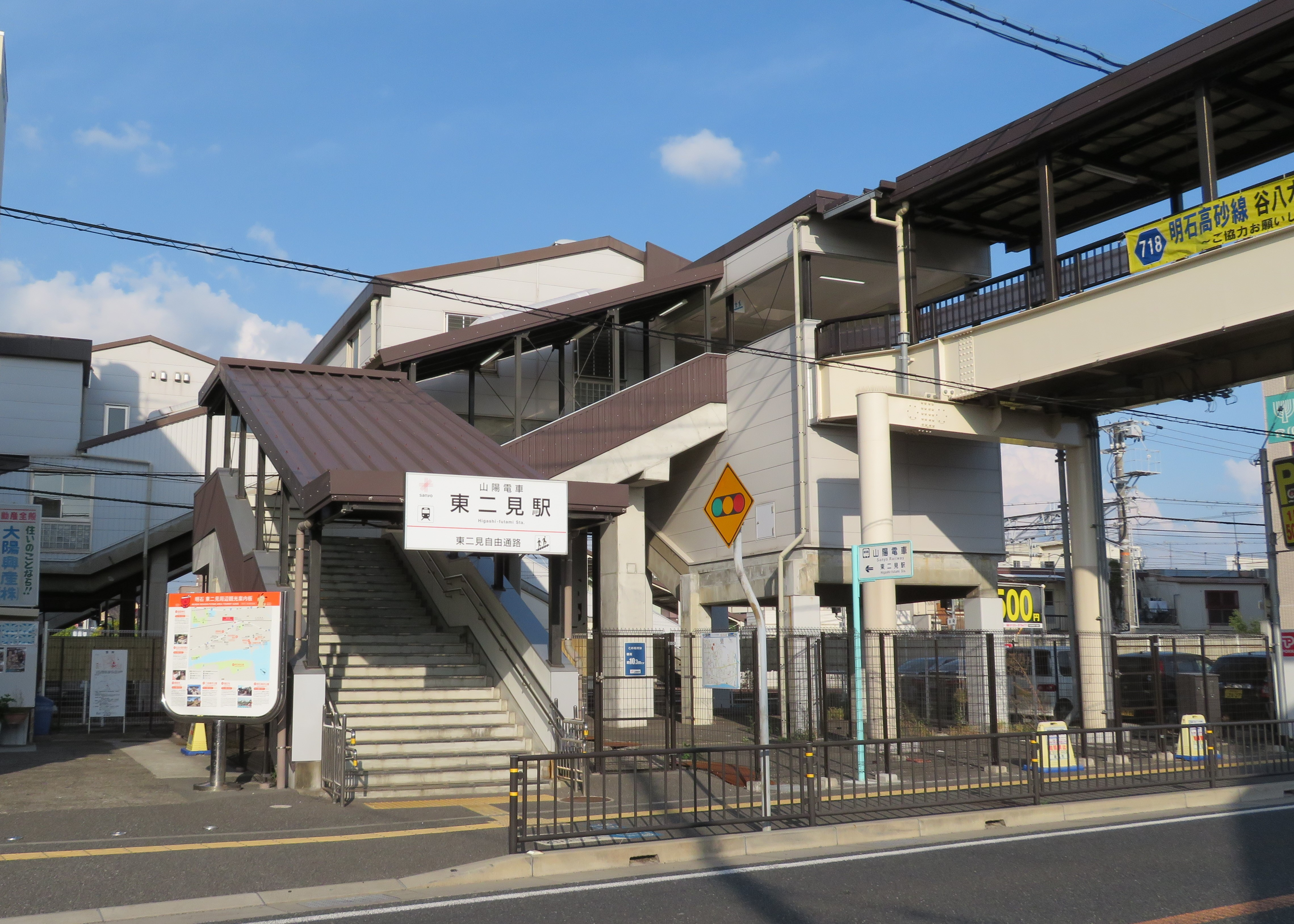
- Higashi-Futami Station south exit, August 2019

General information
- Location: Higashifutami-417-9 Futami-chō, Akashi-shi, Hyōgo-ken 674-0092; Japan
- Coordinates: 34.7000071°N 134.8883772°E
- Operator: Sanyo Electric Railway
- Line: ■ Main Line
- Distance: 27.3 km from Nishidai
- Platforms: 3 island platforms
- Connections

Other information
- Station code: SY25
- Website: Official website

History
- Opened: 19 August 1923

Passengers
- FY2019: 4,471 (boarding only)
Location
- Location within Hyōgo Prefecture Location within Japan

Higashi-Futami Station (東二見駅, Higashi-Futami-eki) is a passenger railway station located in the city of Akashi, Hyōgo Prefecture, Japan, operated by the private Sanyo Electric Railway.

== Lines ==
Higashi-Futami Station is served by the Sanyo Electric Railway Main Line and is 27.3 kilometers from the terminus of the line at Nishidai.

== Station layout ==
The station consists of three ground-level island platforms serving five tracks, with an elevated station building.

=== Platforms ===
1, 2	■ Main Line	for Takasago, Himeji and Sanyo-Aboshi
3, 4	■ Main Line	for Kobe and Osaka
5	■ Main Line	spare platform

== Adjacent stations ==
«	Service	»
Sanyo Electric Railway
Sanyo Electric Railway Main Line
Terminus	Sanyo Limited Express	Befu
Sanyo Akashi	Through Limited Express	Befu
Fujie	S Limited Express	Nishi-Futami
Sanyo Uozumi	Local	Nishi-Futami

== History ==
Higashi-Futami Station opened on August 19, 1923.

== Passenger statistics ==
In fiscal 2018, the station was used by an average of 4,471 passengers daily (boarding passengers only).

== Surrounding area ==
- Akashi City Futami Civic Center
- Akashi City Futami Children's Garden
- Mikuriya Shrine
- Zuio-ji Temple

== See also ==
- List of railway stations in Japan
