= Tegarayamaheiwakōen Station =

Railway station in Himeji, Hyōgo Prefecture, Japan

Tegarayamaheiwakōen Station 手柄山平和公園駅
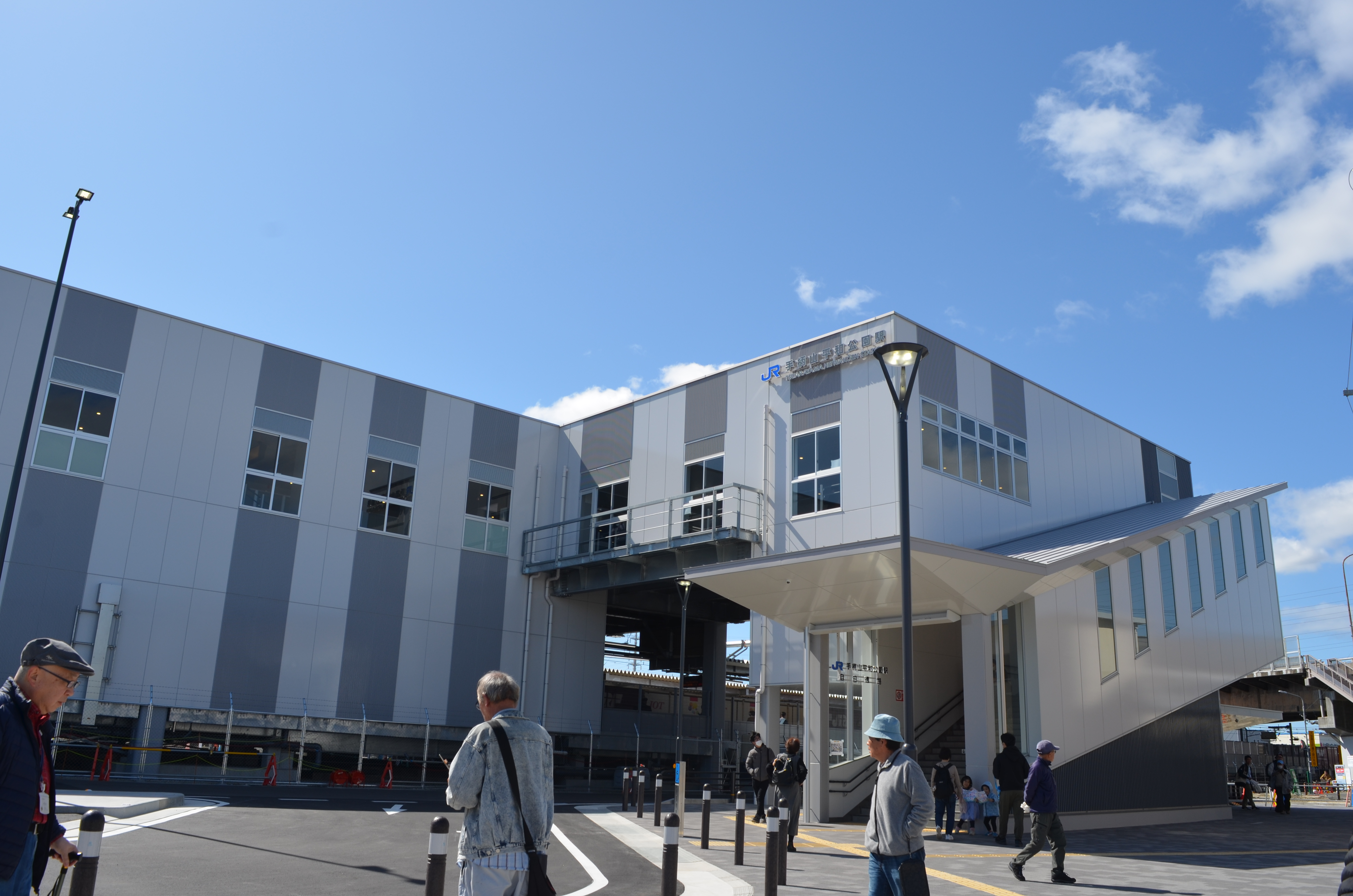
- Station building in March 2026

General information
- Location: Nishinobusue, Himeji, Hyogo Prefecture, Japan
- Coordinates: 34.82325°N 134.671389°E
- Owner: JR West
- Operator: JR West
- Line: A San'yō Main Line
- Distance: 56.6 km (35.2 miles) from Kobe
- Platforms: Two side platforms
- Tracks: 2

History
- Opened: 14 March 2026

Services
Preceding station	JR West	Following station
Agaho towards Mitsuishi	San'yō Line	Himeji Terminus
Location
- Location within Hyōgo Prefecture Location within Japan

Tegarayamaheiwakōen Station (Japanese: 手柄山平和公園駅, Hepburn: Tegarayamaheiwakōen-eki; lit. 'Tegarayama Peace Park Station') is a passenger railway station located in the city of Himeji, Hyōgo Prefecture, Japan, operated by the West Japan Railway Company (JR West).

== Lines ==
Tegarayamaheiwakōen Station is served by the JR San'yō Main Line, and is located 56.6 kilometers from the terminus of the line at Kobe and 89.7 kilometers from Osaka.

== Station layout ==
The station consists of two opposing side platforms connected by an elevated station building. The station is unstaffed.

=== Platforms ===
1	■ San'yō Main Line	for Kamigōri and Okayama
2	■ San'yō Main Line	for Himeji and Osaka

== History ==
Multiple infill stations have opened in the city of Himeji during the 21st century. The Himeji-Bessho Station opened in 2005, the Harima-Katsuhara Station opened in 2008, and the Higashi-Himeji Station opened in 2016. The section of the San'yō Main Line between Himeji Station and Agaho Station used to have the longest distance between stations in the city at the length of 4.6 km (2.9 mi). The construction of the station was part of the city's plan to revamp the Tegarayama Peace Park by 2025, which has multiple commercial facilities such as aquariums. The station was planned to improve access to the park, which was often visited by cars. In 2016, West Japan Railway Company (JR West) came in an agreement with the city of Himeji to open the station in northwest of the park around 2025, with the city paying two-third of the costs.

The design of the station was revealed on December 9, 2022. Construction of the station commenced in July 2025. On August 19, 2025, it was announced that the name of the new station will be Tegarayamaheiwakōen Station. The construction of the station costs 3.0 billion JPY, and the station is expected to be used by around 5,000 passengers every day. Tegarayamaheiwakōen Station was opened on 14 March 2026.

== Surrounding area ==
- Tegarayama Peace Park
  - Memorial for Victims of Pacific War Aerial Bombing
  - Himeji Baseball Stadium
  - Wink Athletic Stadium
  - HIMEJI CITY AQUARIUM
  - Himeji City Tegarayama Botanical Garden
  - Himeji Municipal Central Gymnasium
  - Hyogo Prefectural Budokan
  - Himeji Peace Museum
  - Himeji Super Arena (Scheduled for October 2026)
- National Route 2

== See also ==
- List of railway stations in Japan
