= Danjōzan Kofun =

Kofun period burial mound in Himeji, Japan

Danjōzuka Kofun
- 壇場山古墳 (Japanese)
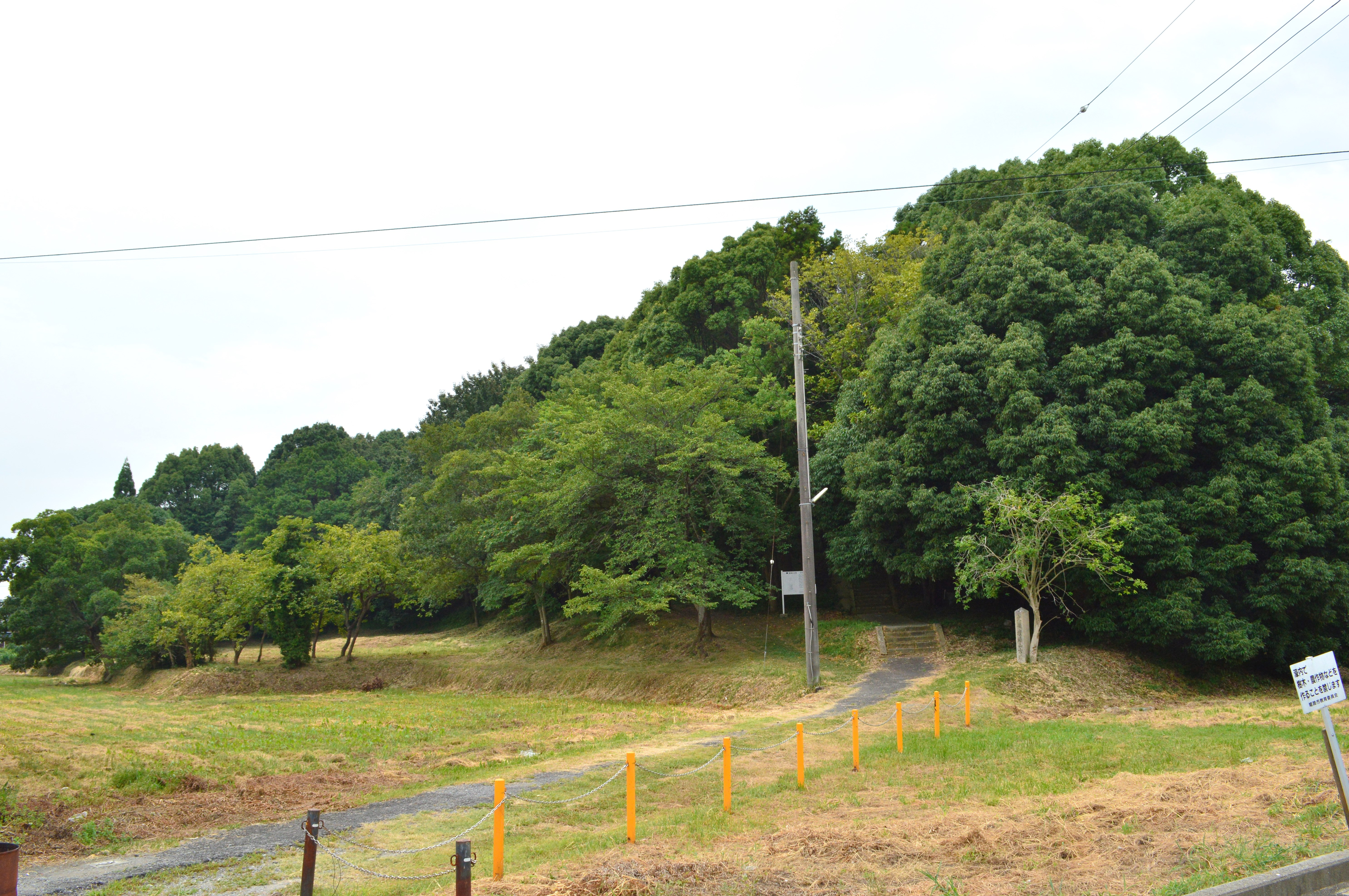
- Danjōzuka Kofun, posterior circular portion to the left

- Danjōzuka Kofun Danjōzan Kofun (Japan)
- 34°49′20.76″N 134°44′7.57″E
- Type: Kofun
- Periods: Kofun period
- Location: Himeji, Hyōgo, Japan
- Region: Kansai region

History
- Built: 5th century AD

Site notes
- Public access: Yes
- National Historic Site of Japan

The Danjōzuka Kofun (壇場山古墳) refers to a group of kofun burial mounds located in the Mikuninochō-Kokubunji neighborhood of the city of Himeji, Hyōgo Prefecture, in the Kansai region of Japan. Four tumuli were collectively designated a National Historic Site in 1921.

== Danjōzuka Kofun ==
The Danjōzuka Kofun is located on a fluvial terrace on the left bank of the Ichikawa River in eastern Himeji City. Per local tradition, it was constructed by Empress Jingu, who used it as a ceremonial platform. The tumulus has been surveyed, but no archaeological excavation has been conducted. The tumulus is a zenpō-kōen-fun (前方後円墳), which is shaped like a keyhole, having one square end and one circular end, when viewed from above. It is orientated to the northwest and has an overall length of around 143 meters, making it the third largest in the region. It is constructed in three layers, and has almost identical dimensions to the Nakatsuyama Kofun in Fujiidera, Osaka, with artifacts on both the east and west sides of the central constriction, indicating a strong connection with the Yamato Kingdom. The surface was covered in fukiishi, and both cylindrical and figurative haniwa have been found. The tumulus was surrounded by a shield-shaped moat with a width of about 10 to 20 meters.

The lid stone of a stone sarcophagus is partially exposed on the top of the posterior circular portion. This stone measures 2.7 meters in length and 1.2 meters in width, and there are a total of eight rope-hanging protrusions, two on each side. However, as it is resting on the top of the mound, it is not certain whether or not there is a stone burial chamber underneath, and it is also unclear if the sarcophagus has been opened. An article dated November 23, 1903 in the Kobe Asahi Shimbun debated whether or not it should be opened, and another article dated from 1910 mentioned that some 200 iron artifacts including ten iron swords were excavated in the northwestern part of the tumulus, but it is not clear whether or not this is a different location from this sarcophagus. Since the existing sarcophagus is not located in the center of the posterior circular portion, and there have been many instances of multiple burial facilities in other kofun, this remains a possibility. The tumulus is estimated to have been built around the first half of the 5th century in the middle of the Kofun period, and to be the grave of the kuni no miyatsuko of Harima.

Overall length
142.8 meters
Posterior circular portion
83 meter diameter x 13.2 meters high x 3-tier
Anterior rectangular portion
87 meters wide x 11.4 meters high x 3-tier

The tumulus was once surrounded by ten smaller kofun, of which eight have been destroyed due to residential housing development. The remaining two are part of the National Historic Site designation. The tumuli are about a ten-minute walk from Gochaku Station on the JR West San'yō Main Line.

The Rindō Higashizuka Kofun (林堂東塚古墳) is listed as "No.1 Kofun" in the National Historic Site designation. It is a circular enpun (円墳)-style tumulus with a diameter of 18 meter, located on the east side of the posterior circular portion of the Danjōzuka Kofun. It is in very poor preservation with much its mound shaved away. The Kushinodō Kofun (櫛之堂古墳) is listed as "No.2 Kofun" in the National Historic Site designation. It is also an enpun and is located on the southwest side of the posterior circular portion of the Danjōzuka Kofun. It is also in very poor preservation with much its mound shaved away.

== Yamanokoshi Kofun ==
The Yamanokoshi Kofun (山之越古墳) is listed as "No.3 Kofun" in the National Historic Site designation. It is located about 150 meters northwest of the main axis of the Danjōyama tumulus. The tumulus is a square hōfun (方墳)-style kofun, measuring 60 meters on each side, with a height of seven meters. This makes it the largest hōfun in the prefecture, but the northern half of the tumulus has been destroyed, and it is in poor preservation. Some traces of fukiishi and small fragments of haniwa gave been found, and they mound was once surrounded by a moat with a width of 17 meters. A stone sarcophagus is currently exposed at the top of the mound, and as no trace of a stone-lined burlap chamber have been found it is believed to have been directly buried in the tumulus. The length of the sarcophagus is shorter than that of the Danjōzuka Kofun, and it is considered to be of later date from its style. When the sarcophagus was opened in 1897, the bones indie were found to be orientated to the north and resting on a bad of white river stones. Grave goods included a 16.4-cm bronze mirror, magatama, tubular beads and an iron sword. These artifacts were not preserved properly and the mirror and sword have severely deteriorated, whereas the other artifacts, including additional bronze mirrors and iron swords found outside the sarcophagus, have been scattered and their whereabouts are currently unknown. It is estimated that this burial mound was built in the middle of the 5th century, following the Danjōzuka Kofun, and that it is of the less-prestigious hōfun-style is an indication that the local rulers ad by that time become more subservient to Yamato authority.

== Gallery ==
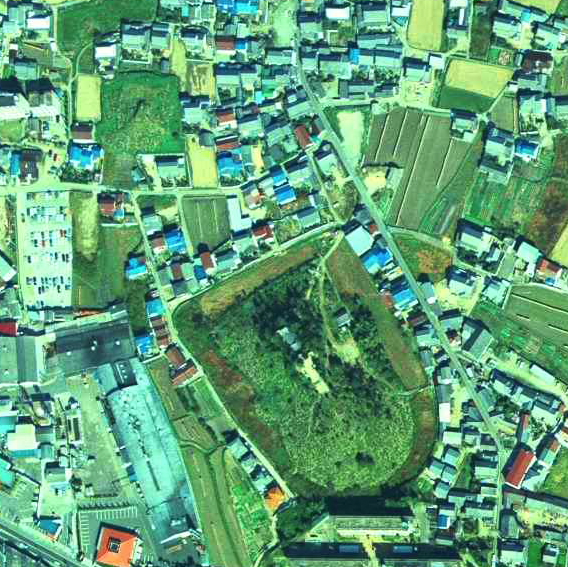
Danjōzuka Kofun in 1980

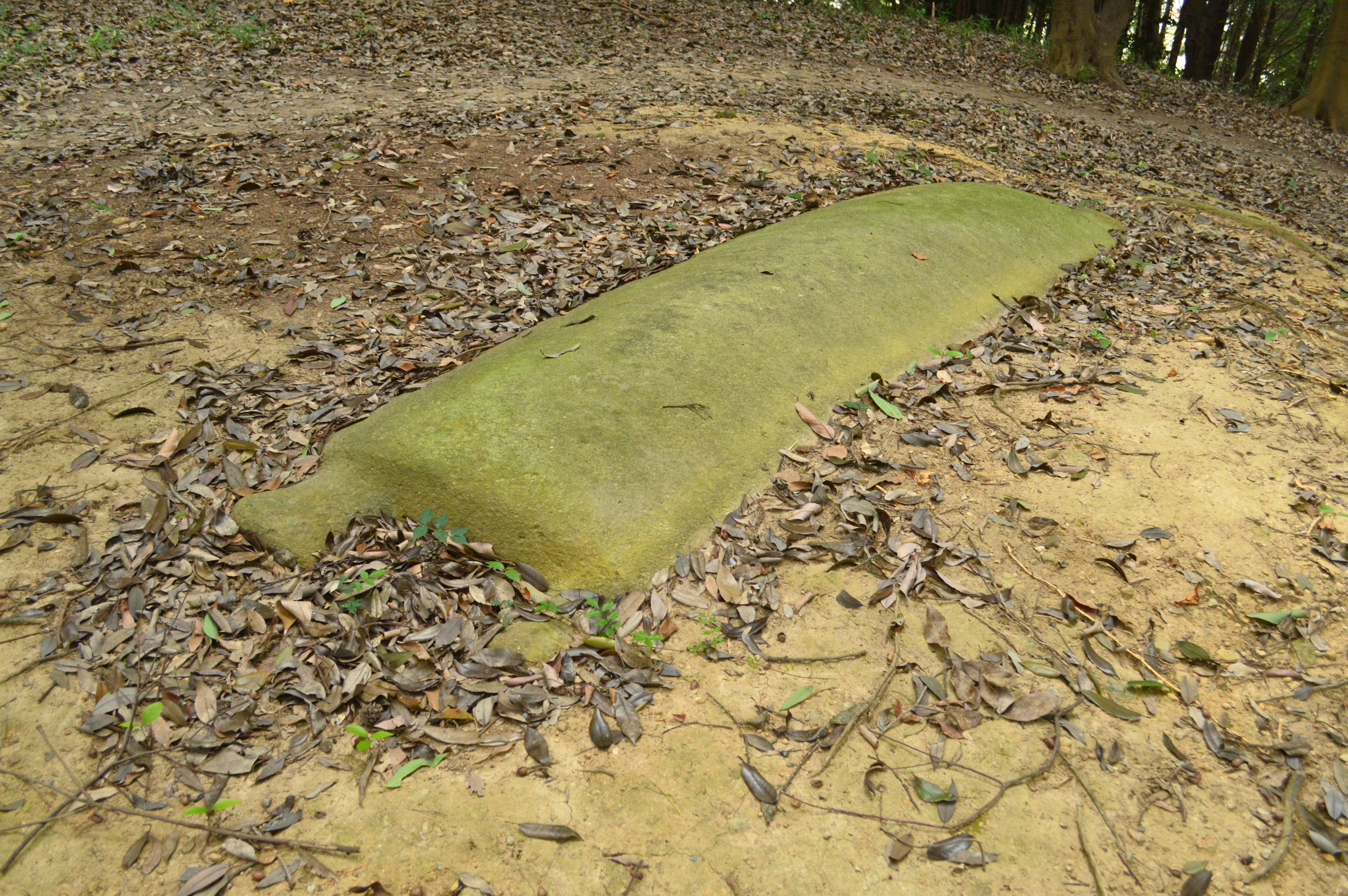
Exposed stone sarcophagus of the Danjōzuka Kofun

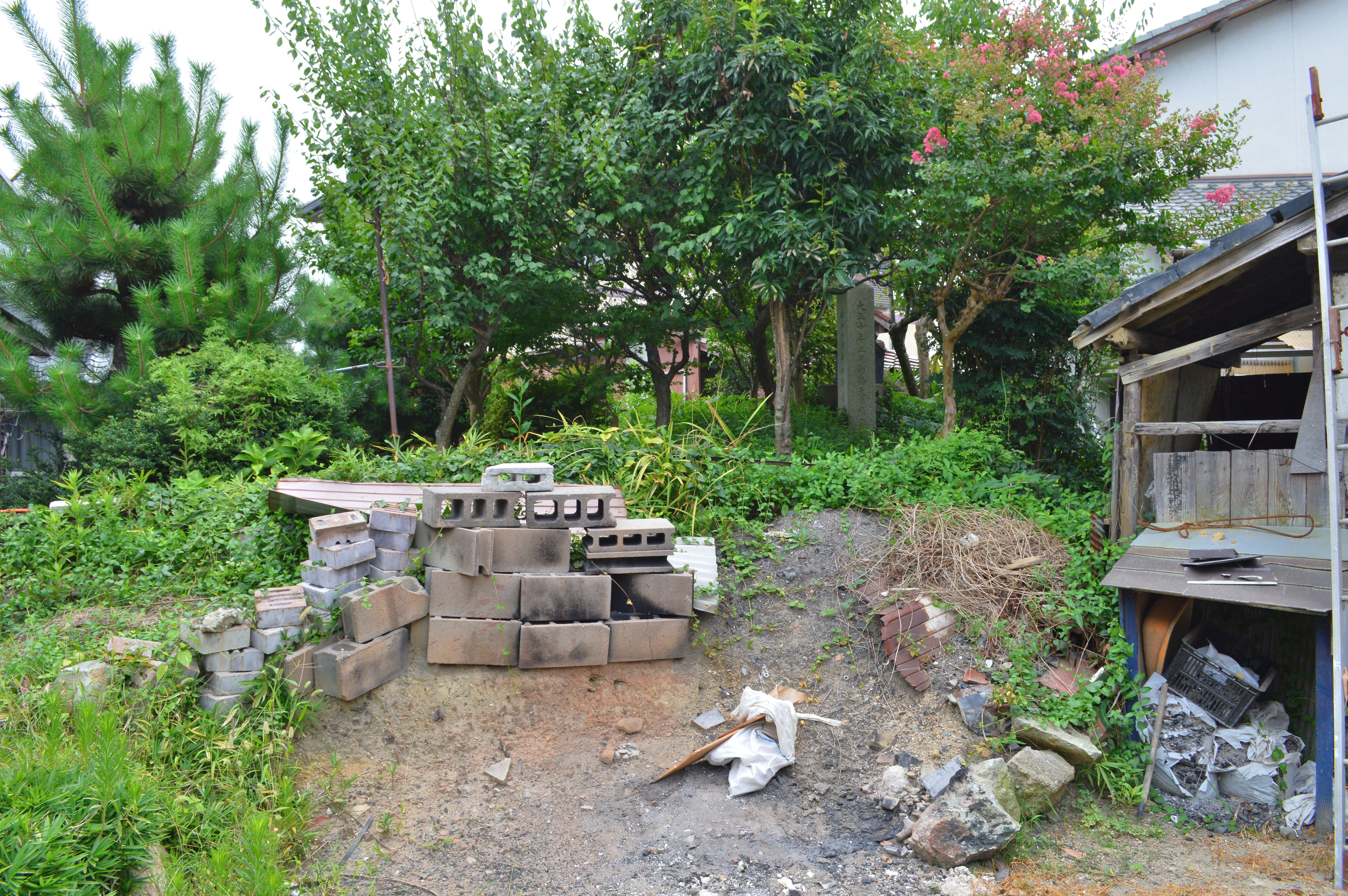
CRindō Higashizuka Kofun

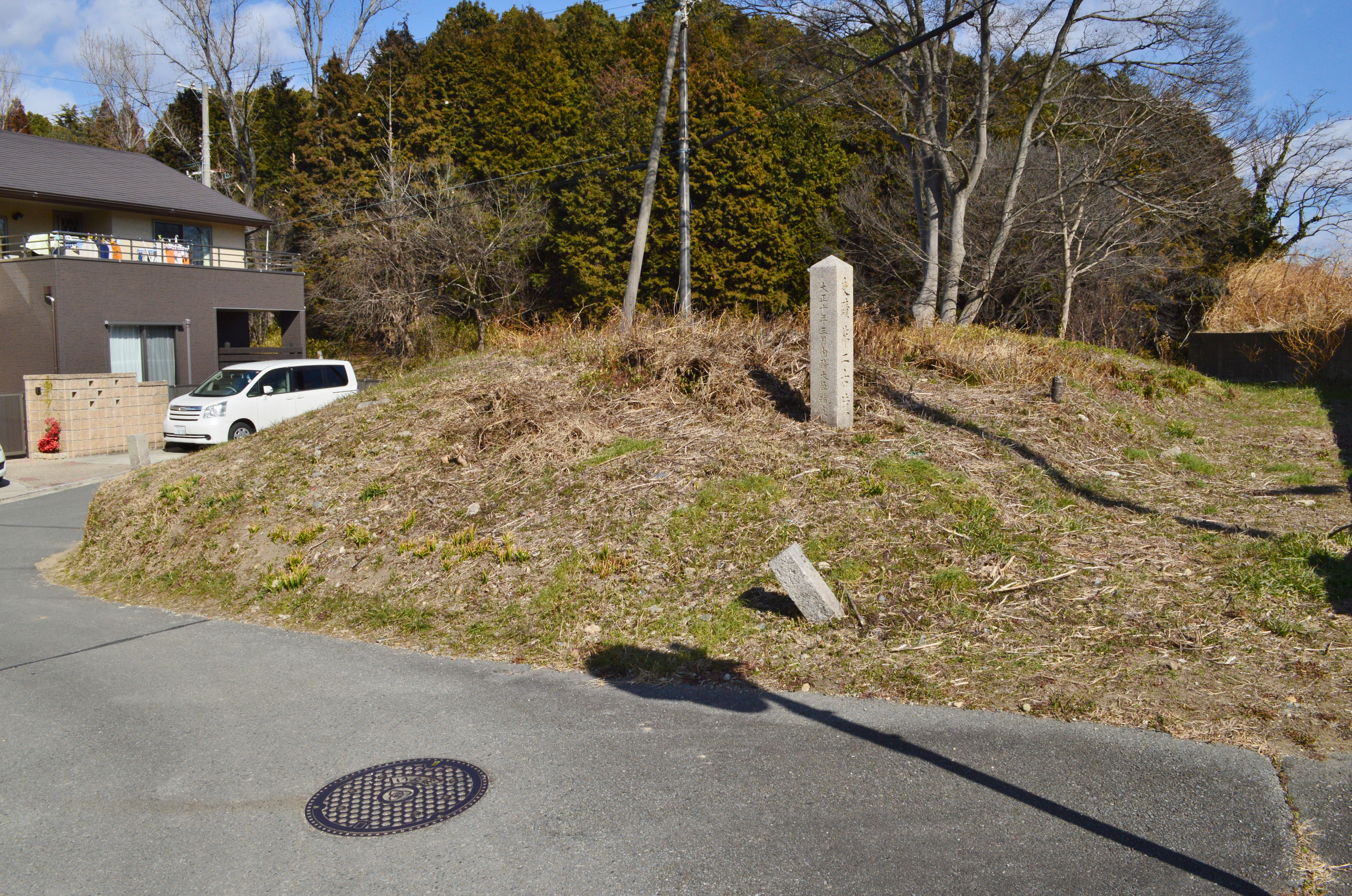
Kushinodō Kofun

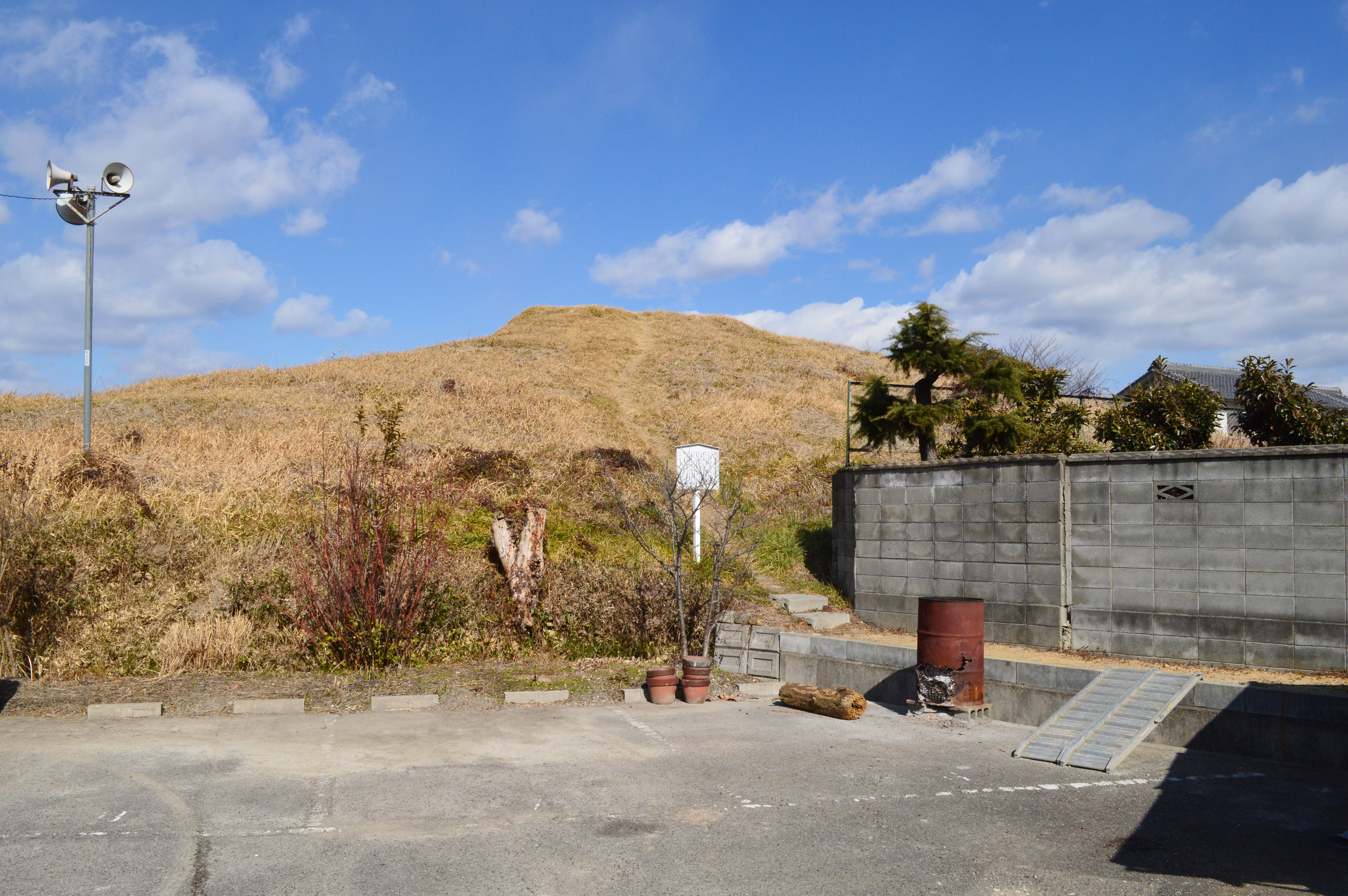
Yamanokoshi Kofun

== See also ==
- List of Historic Sites of Japan (Hyōgo)
