= Agaho Station =

Railway station in Himeji, Hyōgo Prefecture, Japan

Agaho Station 英賀保駅
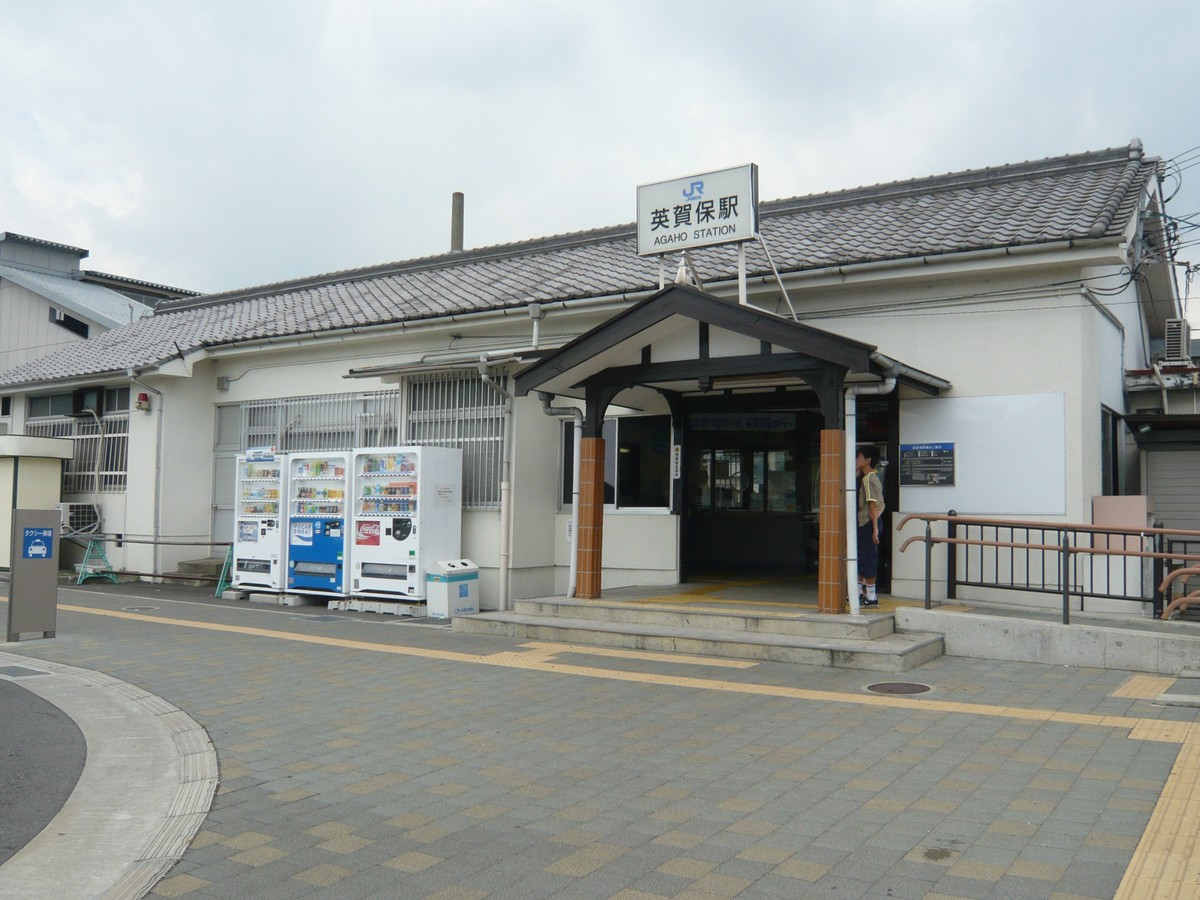
- Agaho Station in August 2007

General information
- Location: 132 Yamasakidai, Shikama-ku, Himeji-shi, Hyōgo-ken 672-8096; Japan
- Coordinates: 34.8130°N 134.6449°E
- Owner: West Japan Railway Company
- Operator: West Japan Railway Company
- Line: San'yō Main Line
- Distance: 59.4 km (36.9 miles) from Kobe
- Platforms: 1 side + 1 island platform
- Connections: Bus stop

Other information
- Status: Staffed
- Website: Official website

History
- Opened: 15 April 1913

Passengers
- FY2019: 4623 daily
Location
- Location within Hyōgo Prefecture Location within Japan

Agaho Station (英賀保駅, Agaho-eki) is a passenger railway station located in the city of Himeji, Hyōgo Prefecture, Japan, operated by the West Japan Railway Company (JR West).

== Lines ==
Agaho Station is served by the JR San'yō Main Line, and is located 59.4 kilometers from the terminus of the line at Kobe and 92.5 kilometers from Osaka.

== Station layout ==
The station consists of one ground-level side platform and one ground-level island platform connected by a footbridge. The station is staffed.

=== Platforms ===
1	■ San'yō Main Line	for Kamigōri and Okayama
2, 3	■ San'yō Main Line	for Himeji and Osaka

== Adjacent stations ==
«	Service	»
JR West
Sanyō Main Line (JR Kobe Line)
Limited Express Super Hakuto: Does not stop at this station
Tegarayamaheiwakōen	Special Rapid	Harima-Katsuhara
Tegarayamaheiwakōen	Local/Rapid	Harima-Katsuhara

== History ==
Agaho Station began as the Agaho Signal Stop on 1 November 1911. It became a full station on 15 April 1913. With the privatization of Japanese National Railways (JNR) on 1 April 1987, the station came under the control of JR West. With the privatization of the Japan National Railways (JNR) on 1 April 1987, the station came under the aegis of the West Japan Railway Company.

== Passenger statistics ==
In fiscal 2019, the station was used by an average of 4623 passengers daily

== Surrounding area ==
- Himeji City Agaho Elementary School
- Eiga Castle Ruins
- Aga Shrine

== See also ==
- List of railway stations in Japan
