= Hōden Station =

Railway station in Takasago, Hyōgo Prefecture, Japan

Hōden Station 宝殿駅
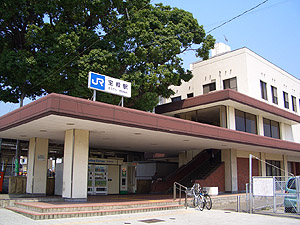
- Hōden Station, July 2005

General information
- Location: 1-15-6 Kazume-chō, Takasago-shi, Hyōgo-ken 676-0808; Japan
- Coordinates: 34.7847°N 134.8120°E
- Owner: West Japan Railway Company
- Operator: West Japan Railway Company
- Line: San'yō Main Line
- Distance: 42.4 km (26.3 miles) from Kobe
- Platforms: 2 side platforms
- Connections: Bus stop

Construction
- Structure type: Ground level
- Accessible: Yes

Other information
- Status: Staffed
- Station code: JR-A80
- Website: Official website

History
- Opened: 14 May 1900

Passengers
- FY2019: 9722 daily

Services
Preceding station	JR West	Following station
Sone towards Himeji	JR Kōbe Line Rapid	Kakogawa towards Ōsaka
Location
- Location within Hyōgo Prefecture Location within Japan

Hōden Station (宝殿駅, Hōden-eki) is a passenger railway station located in the city of Takasago, Hyōgo Prefecture, Japan, operated by the West Japan Railway Company (JR West).

== Lines ==
Hōden Station is served by the JR San'yō Main Line, and is located 42.4 kilometers from the terminus of the line at Kobe and 75.5 kilometers from Osaka.

== Station layout ==
The station consists of a ground-level side platform and an island platform connected by an elevated station building; however one side of the island platform is not in use effectively giving the station two opposed side platforms. The station is staffed.

=== Platforms ===
1	■ San'yō Main Line	for Himeji
3	■ San'yō Main Line	for Sannomiya and Osaka

== History ==
Hōden Station opened on 14 May 1900. With the privatization of the Japan National Railways (JNR) on 1 April 1987, the station came under the aegis of the West Japan Railway Company.

Station numbering was introduced in March 2018 with Hōden being assigned station number JR-A80.

== Passenger statistics ==
In fiscal 2019, the station was used by an average of 9722 passengers daily

== Surrounding area ==
- Ishi no Hōden National Historic Site
- Takasago City Sports Park
- Kakogawa Sports Park
- Hyogo Prefectural Toban Technical High School
- Takasago City Hoden Junior High School

== See also ==
- List of railway stations in Japan
