= Sone Station (Hyōgo) =

Railway station in Takasago, Hyōgo Prefecture, Japan

Sone Station 曽根駅
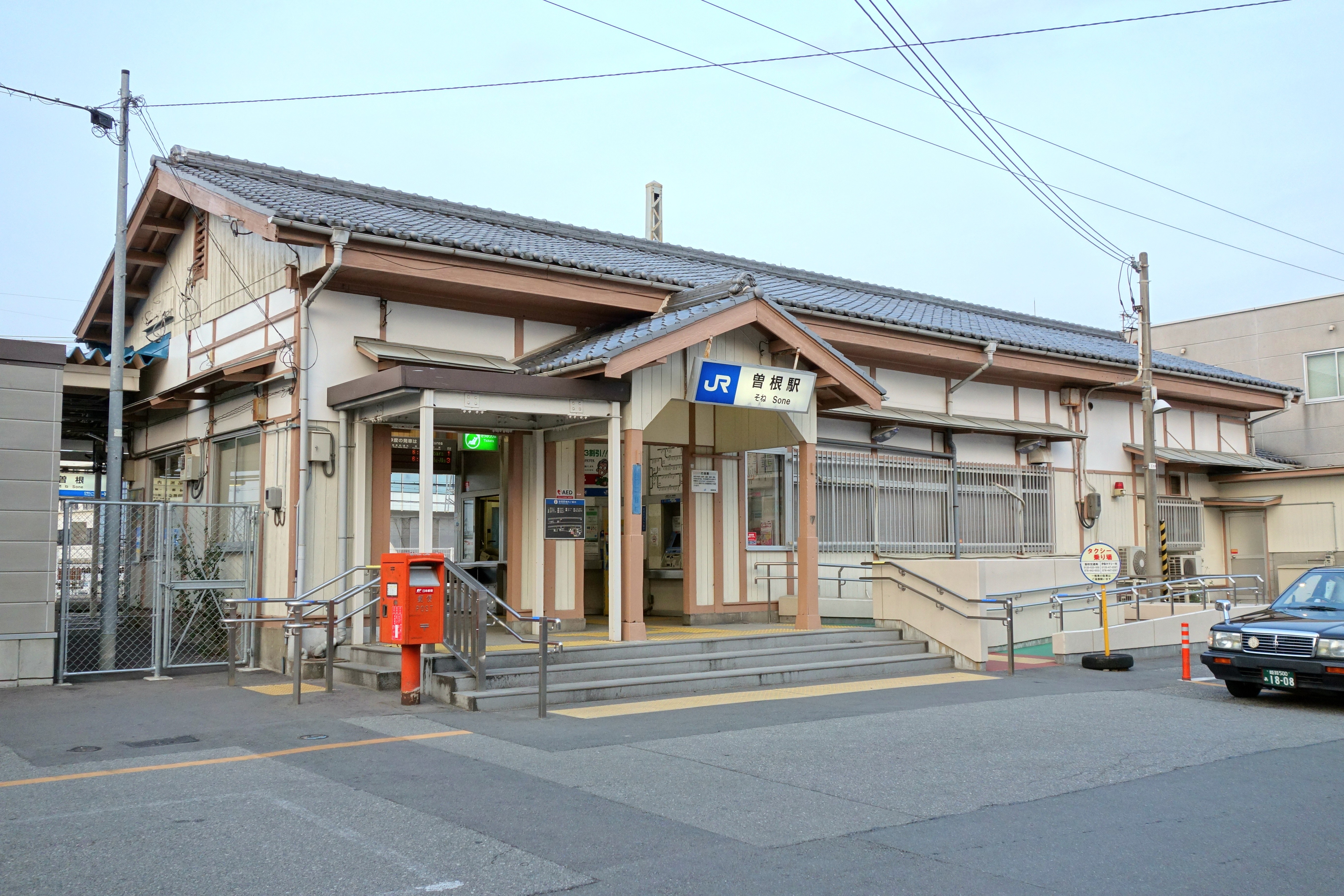
- Sone Station, May 2013

General information
- Location: 1-6 Amida-chō, Takasago-shi, Hyōgo-ken 676-0815; Japan
- Coordinates: 34°47′36″N 134°46′12″E
- Owner: West Japan Railway Company
- Operator: West Japan Railway Company
- Line: San'yō Main Line
- Distance: 46.4 km (28.8 miles) from Kobe
- Platforms: 2 side platforms
- Connections: Bus stop

Construction
- Structure type: Ground level, Elevated
- Accessible: Yes

Other information
- Status: Staffed
- Station code: JR-A81
- Website: Official website

History
- Opened: 23 December 1888
- Former names: Amida (to 1902)

Passengers
- FY2019: 4029 daily

Services
Preceding station	JR West	Following station
Himeji-Bessho towards Himeji	JR Kōbe Line Rapid	Hōden towards Ōsaka
Location
- Location within Hyōgo Prefecture Location within Japan

Sone Station (曽根駅, Sone-eki) is a passenger railway station located in the city of Takasago, Hyōgo, Japan, operated by the West Japan Railway Company (JR West).

== Lines ==
Sone Station is served by the JR San'yō Main Line, and is located 46.4 kilometers from the terminus of the line at Kobe and 79.5 kilometers from Osaka.

== Station layout ==
The station consists of a ground-level side platform and an island platform connected by an elevated station building; however one side of the island platform is not in use effectively giving the station two parallel side platforms. The station is staffed.

=== Platforms ===
1	■ San'yō Main Line	for Sannomiya and Osaka
3	■ San'yō Main Line	for Kakogawa and Himeji

== History ==
Sone Station opened on 23 December 1888 as Amida Station (阿弥陀駅). It was renamed on 1 March 1902. With the privatization of the Japan National Railways (JNR) on 1 April 1987, the station came under the aegis of the West Japan Railway Company.

Station numbering was introduced in March 2018 with Sone being assigned station number JR-A81.

== Passenger statistics ==
In fiscal 2019, the station was used by an average of 4029 passengers daily

== Surrounding area ==
- Takasago Seibu Hospital
- Hyogo Prefectural Himeji Bessho High School
- Hakuryo Junior and Senior High School
- Takasago Municipal Kashima Junior High School
- Takasago Municipal Amida Elementary School

== See also ==
- List of railway stations in Japan
