= Ishi no Hōden =

Megalithic shrine in Takasago, Kansai, Japan

- 石の宝殿 (Japanese)
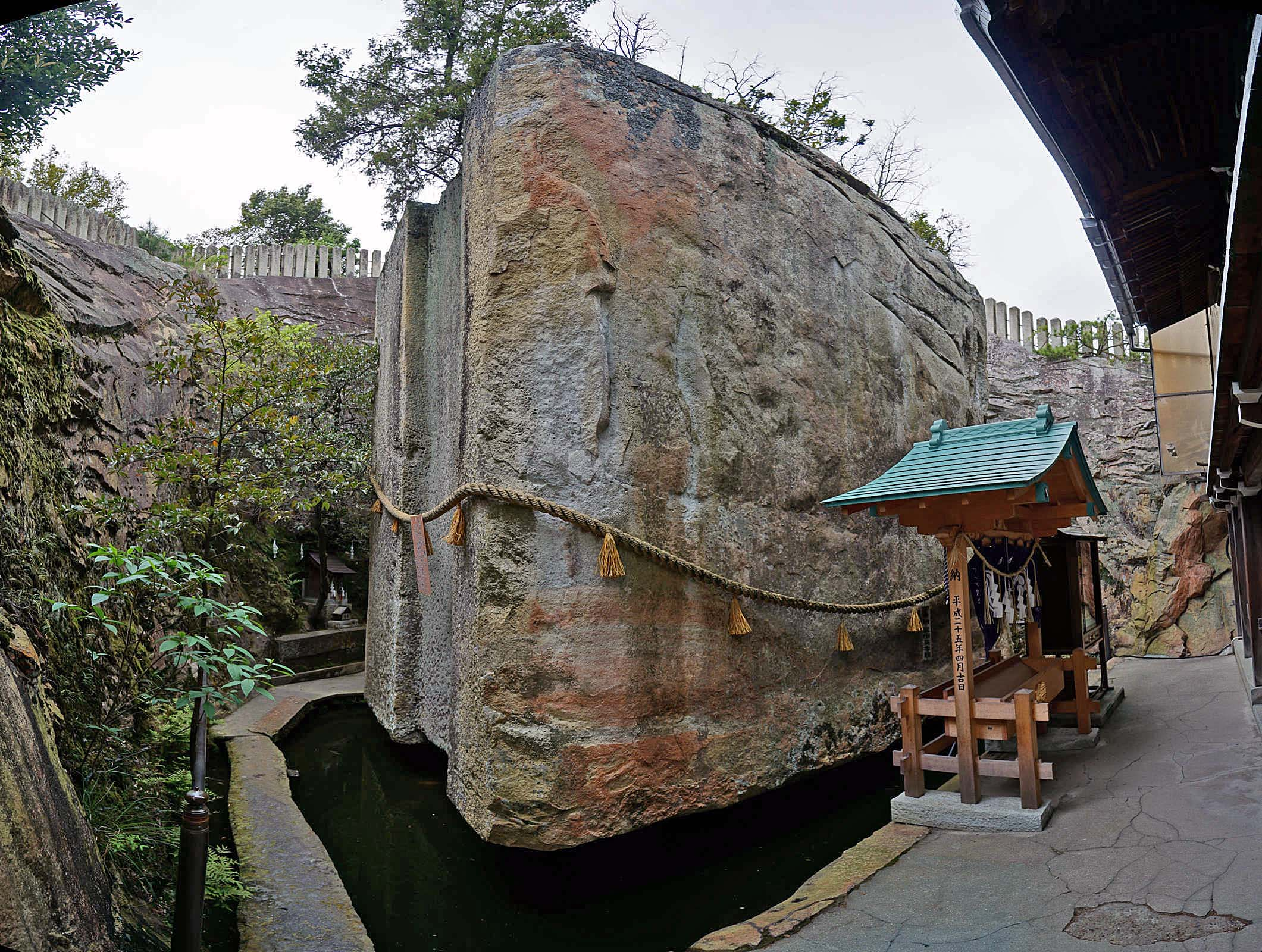
- Ishi no Hōden

- Ishi no Hōden Ishi no Hōden (Japan)
- Interactive map of Ishi no Hōden
- 34°46′57.15″N 134°47′42.78″E
- Type: megalith
- Location: Takasago, Hyōgo, Japan
- Region: Kansai region

The Ishi no Hōden (石の宝殿) is a megalithic monument located in the grounds of the Ōshiko Jinja (生石神社), a Shinto shrine located in the city of Takasago, Hyōgo Prefecture in the Kansai region of Japan. Of unknown age, it was designated a National Historic Site of Japan in 1979 collectively with the nearby Tatsuyama Stone Quarries (竜山石採石遺跡, Tatsuyama Ishisaiseki iseki), which dates from the Kofun period. It is also called the Ame no Ukiishi (天の浮石).

== Ishi no Hōden ==
The Ishi-no-Hōden is made from tuff and is surrounded on three sides by unprocessed bedrock. With a weight estimated at 500 tons, it measures 6.4 meters wide by 5.7 meters high by 7.2 meters in thickness. In shape, it is carved in the form of two flat rectangular parallelepipeds oriented vertically and sandwiching a small rectangular parallelepiped. One of the sides has a protrusion shaped like the top of a pyramid. The space between the surrounding bedrock and the megalith is wide enough for one adult to pass through, and it is possible to go around (admission fee is required). The monolith is situated in a large depression, which forms a pond at its base. The monolith is carved with a pillar at the center of its base, which is not visible at eye-level, so the monolith appears to be floating above the pond.

From 2005 to 2006, laser three-dimensional measurement was carried out to confirm the shape by the Takasago City Board of Education with the cooperation of the Otemae University Research Institute; however, the date the monolith was carved, and by whom and for what purpose remain unknown. According to a Shinto legend, the kami Ōkuninushi and Sukunabikona came from Izumo to Harima and attempted to build a stone palace overnight. Their efforts were thwarted by a rebellion of the kami of Harima, and the partially completed palace was overthrown. Nevertheless, Ōkuninushi and Sukunabiko decided to protect the land. The monolith is mentioned in the "Harima Kokudo Fudoki" which is dated to around 713 to 717, which attributes it to Mononobe no Moriya per the orders of Prince Shotoku, even though when Prince Shotoku became regent, Mononobe no Moriya had long been dead. During the Edo Period, Philipp Franz von Siebold made note of the monument and left three detailed sketches of it in the first volume of his work Nippon. Archiv zur Beschreibung von Japan und dessen Neben- und Schutzländern from 1832.

The monolith is 1.5 kilometers from Hoden Station on the JR West San'yō Main Line.

== Tatsuyama Stone Quarries ==
"Tatsuyama stone" is the name given to rhyolite welded tuff found on the right bank of the lower reaches of the Kakogawa River. It is a thick deposit of pyroclastic flow ejected by volcanic activity in the late Cretaceous about 100 million years ago and has the density and material strength suitable as a building material. Traces of stone quarries have been found at numerous locations within the borders of the city of Takasago, of which 162 locations covering 670,000 square meters remain. These quarries have been in operation for over 1700 years, from the Kofun period to then present day, and 31 locations in the Tatsuyama and Hodenyama neighborhoods covering 110,000 square meters were selected for protection as a National Historic Site in 1979.

Stone from these quarries was transported by boat from the Hokkesantani River that flows near the quarry, and was used for buildings and stone Buddhas. It was used as the material for many sarcophagus from the middle and late Kofun period and foundation stones for Heijo Palace and various temples in the Yamato region. In more modern times, it was used in the stone walls of Himeji Castle, the Tokyo Imperial Palace and National Diet Building and many other buildings.

== Gallery ==
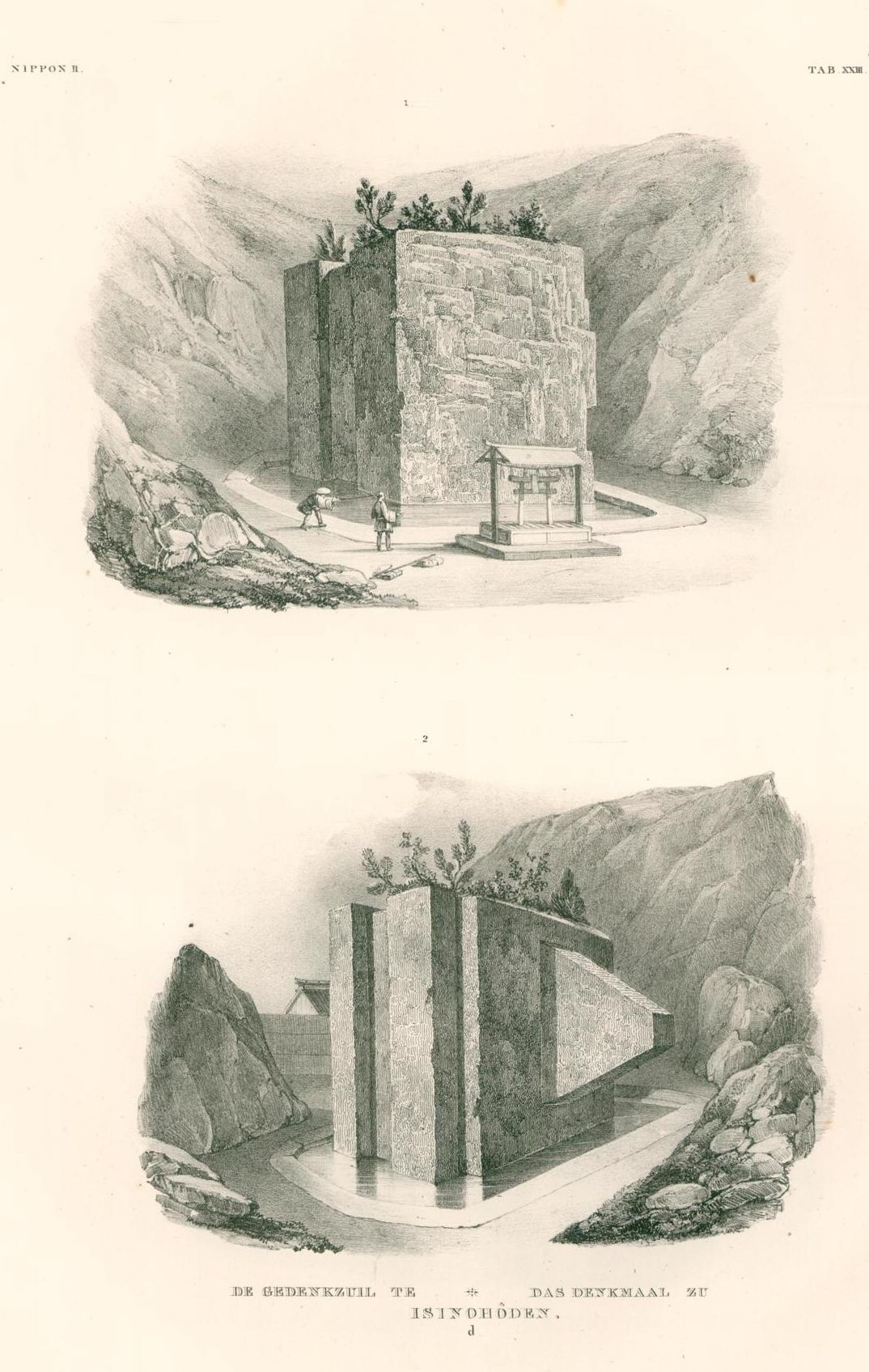
"Isinohôden" in Siebold's Nippon

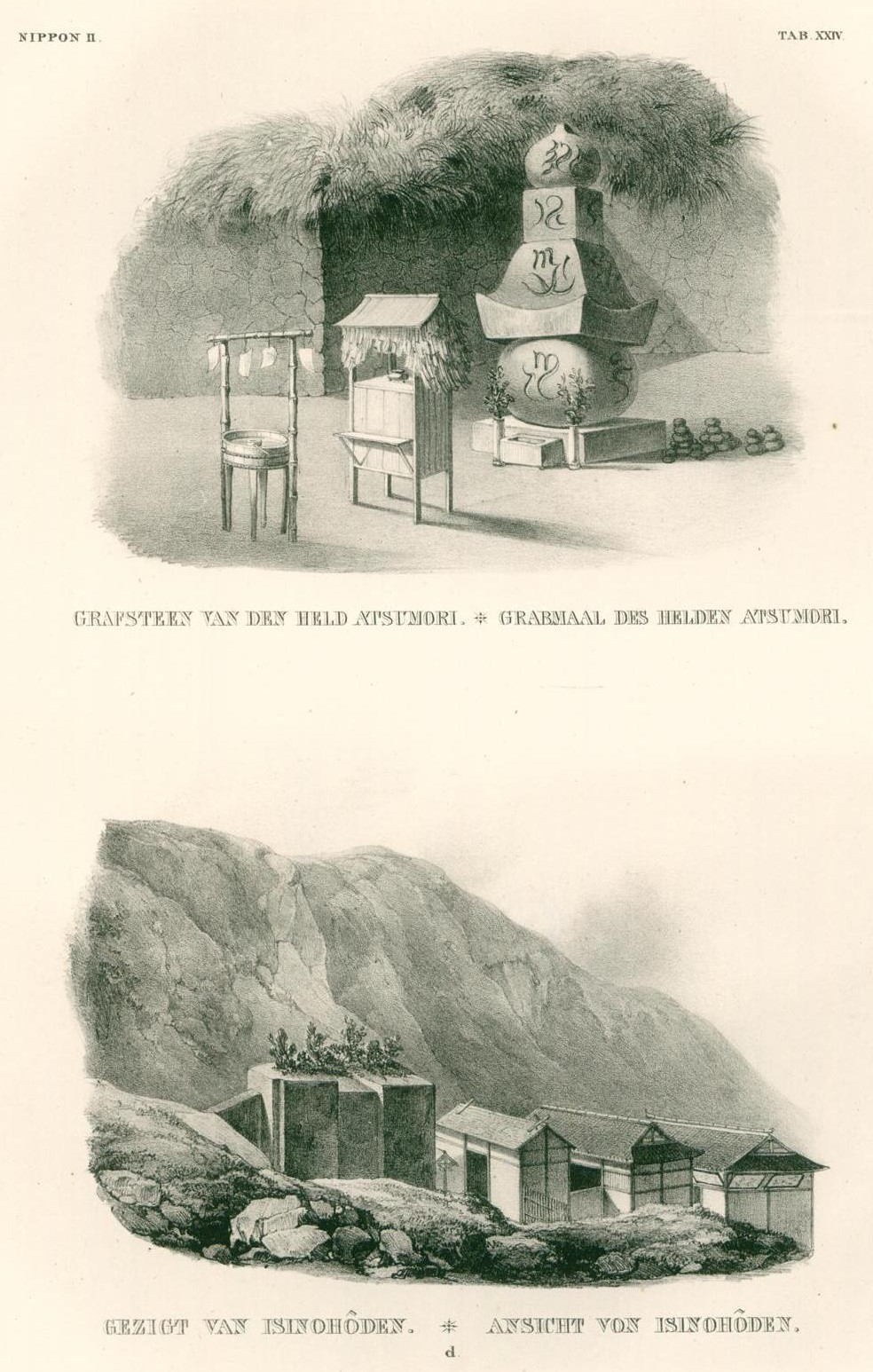
Gravestone of Atsumori and Isinohôden in Siebold's Nippon

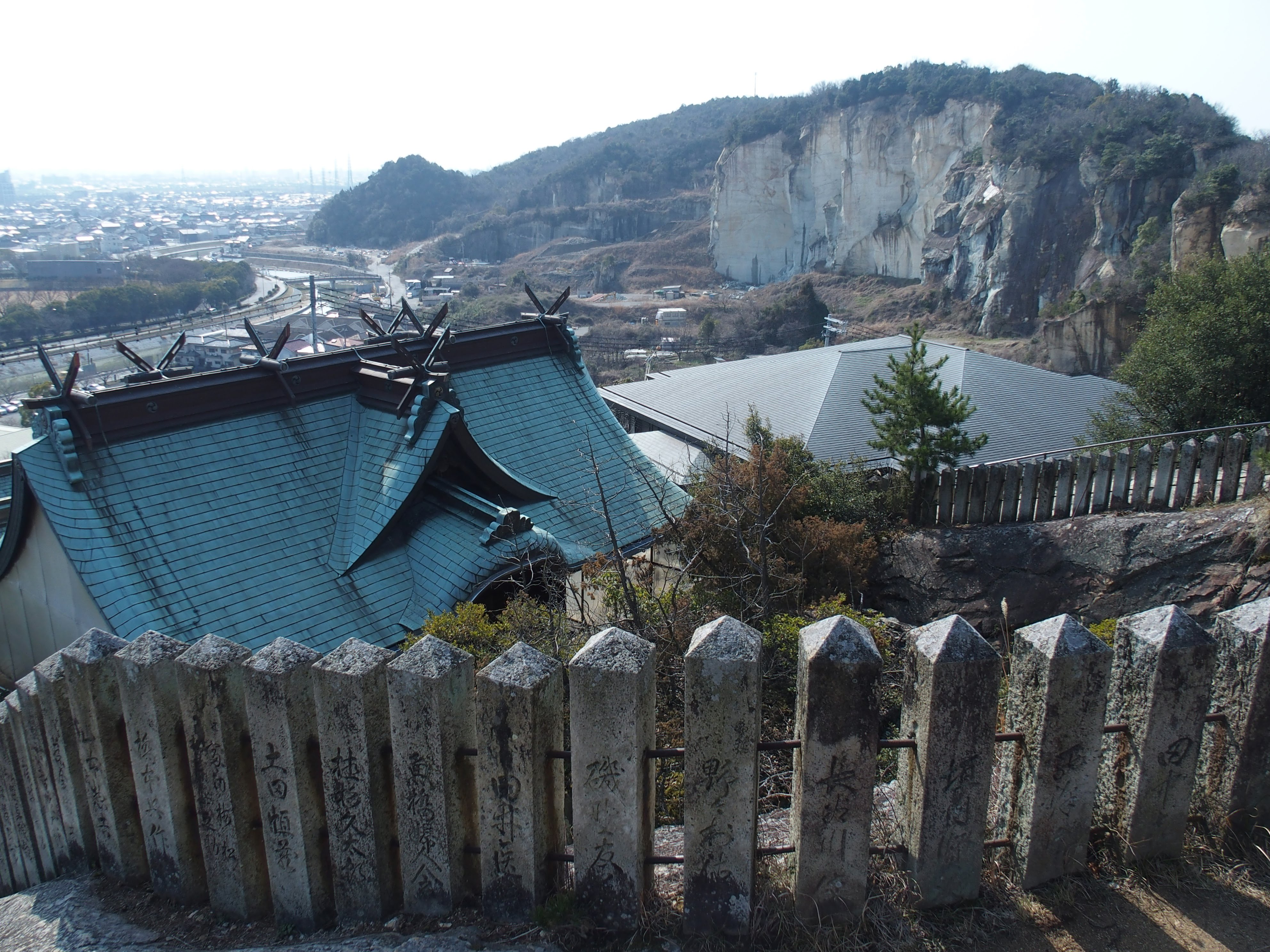
Tatsuyama stone quarries

== See also ==
- List of Historic Sites of Japan (Hyōgo)
