= Gochaku Station =

Railway station in Himeji, Hyōgo Prefecture, Japan

Gochaku Station 御着駅
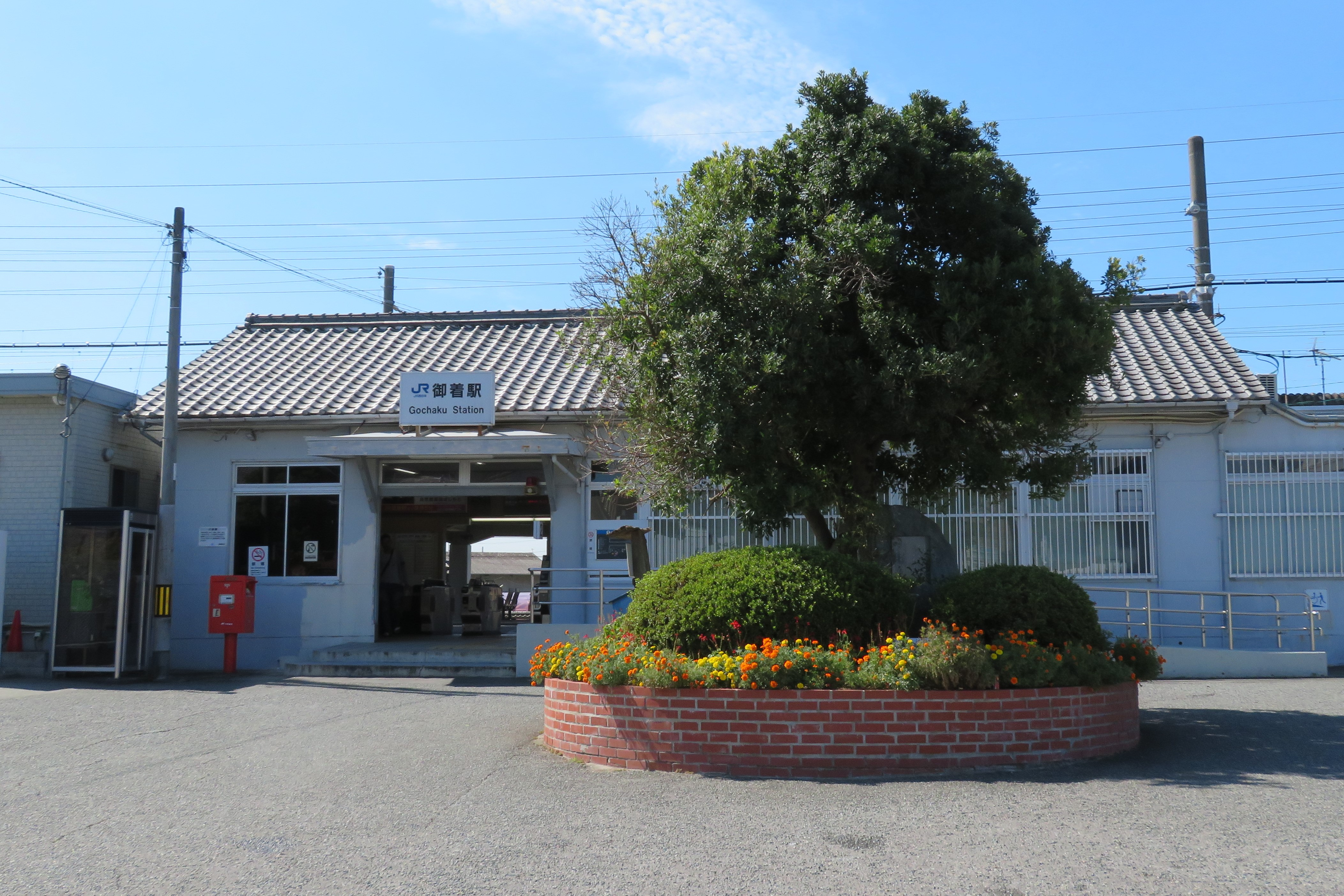
- Gochaku Station in September 2019

General information
- Location: Gochaku Mikunino-chō, Himeji-shi, Hyōgo-ken 671-0232; Japan
- Coordinates: 34.8169°N 134.7355°E
- Owner: West Japan Railway Company
- Operator: West Japan Railway Company
- Line: San'yō Main Line
- Distance: 50.5 km (31.4 miles) from Kobe
- Platforms: 1 side + 1 island platform
- Tracks: 3
- Connections: Bus stop

Construction
- Structure type: Ground level
- Accessible: Yes

Other information
- Status: Staffed
- Station code: JR-A83
- Website: Official website

History
- Opened: 18 April 1900

Passengers
- FY2019: 2900 daily

Services
Preceding station	JR West	Following station
Higashi-Himeji towards Himeji	JR Kōbe Line Rapid	Himeji-Bessho towards Ōsaka
Location
- Location within Hyōgo Prefecture Location within Japan

Gochaku Station (御着駅, Gochaku-eki) is a passenger railway station located in the city of Himeji, Hyōgo Prefecture, Japan, operated by the West Japan Railway Company (JR West).

== Lines ==
Gochaku Station is served by the JR San'yō Main Line, and is located 50.5 kilometers from the terminus of the line at Kobe and 83.6 kilometers from Osaka.

== Station layout ==
The station consists of one ground-level side platform and one ground-level island platform connected by a footbridge. The station is staffed.

=== Platforms ===
1	■ San'yō Main Line	for Sannomiya and Osaka
2	■ San'yō Main Line	for bi-directional services during commuting hours
3	■ San'yō Main Line	for Kakogawa and Himeji

== History ==
Gochaku Station was opened on 18 April 1900. With the privatization of the Japan National Railways (JNR) on 1 April 1987, the station came under the aegis of the West Japan Railway Company.

Station numbering was introduced in March 2018 with Gochaku being assigned station number JR-A83.

== Passenger statistics ==
In fiscal 2019, the station was used by an average of 2900 passengers daily

== Surrounding area ==
- Harima Kokubun-ji Ruins
- Danbayama Kofun
- National Route 2
- National Route 312

== See also ==
- List of railway stations in Japan
