= Higashi-Himeji Station =

Railway station in Himeji, Hyōgo Prefecture, Japan

Higashi-Himeji Station 東姫路駅
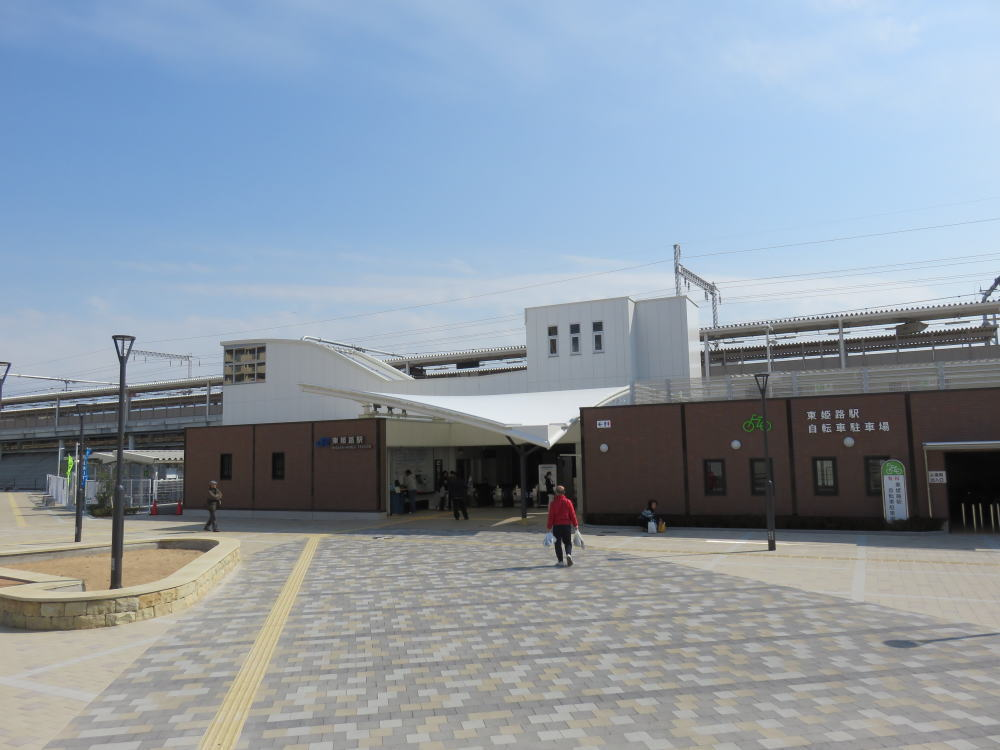
- Himeji-Himeji station entrance in March 2016

General information
- Location: 1046-26 Takada, Ichinogo, Himeji, Himeji-shi, Hyōgo-ken 670-0943; Japan
- Coordinates: 34°49′27.7″N 134°42′44.9″E
- Owner: West Japan Railway Company
- Operator: West Japan Railway Company
- Line: San'yō Main Line
- Distance: 52.9 km (32.9 miles) from Kobe
- Platforms: 2 side platforms
- Tracks: 2
- Connections: Bus stop

Construction
- Structure type: Elevated
- Accessible: Yes

Other information
- Status: Staffed
- Station code: JR-A84
- Website: Official website

History
- Opened: 26 March 2016

Passengers
- FY2019: 1413 daily

Services
Preceding station	JR West	Following station
Himeji Terminus	JR Kōbe Line Rapid	Gochaku towards Ōsaka
Location
- Location within Hyōgo Prefecture Location within Japan

Higashi-Himeji Station (東姫路駅, Higashi-Himeji-eki) is a passenger railway station located in the city of Himeji, Hyōgo Prefecture, Japan, operated by the West Japan Railway Company (JR West).

== Lines ==
Higashi-Himeji Station is served by the JR San'yō Main Line, and is located 52.9 km (32.9 mi) from the terminus of the line at Kobe and 86.0 km (53.4 mi) from Osaka.

== Station layout ==
The station consists of two elevated opposed side platforms with the station building underneath. The station is staffed.

=== Platforms ===
1	■ San'yō Main Line	for Sannomiya and Osaka
2	■ San'yō Main Line	for Himeji and Okayama

== History ==
JR West first notified the city of Himeji of its proposal to build a new station between Gochaku and Himeji in July 2010. Details of the new station were formally announced by JR West on 2 October 2015. While the most popular name voted for in the public ballot held to select the new name was actually Shirasagi (or Hakuro) (白鷺), popular names for Himeji Castle, the second-place name of Higashi-Himeji was ultimately chosen by JR West, as this was deemed less likely to cause confusion among tourists who might mistakenly assume that the station was the closest to Himeji Castle. The total construction costs of JPY 2.7 billion were shared equally by JR West, the city of Himeji, and the national government. Higashi-Himeji Station was opened on 26 March 2016.

Station numbering was introduced in March 2018 with Higashi-Himeji being assigned station number JR-A84.

== Passenger statistics ==
The station was expected to be used by an average of approximately 6,000 passengers daily. In fiscal 2019, the station was used by an average of 1413 passengers daily

== Surrounding area ==
- Hyogo Prefectural Harima Himeji General Medical Center
- Himeji City Higashi Elementary School
- National Route 2
- Ichikawa River

== See also ==
- List of railway stations in Japan
