= Harima Kokubun-ji =

Buddhist temple in Himeji, Japan

Harima Kokubun-ji 播磨国分寺
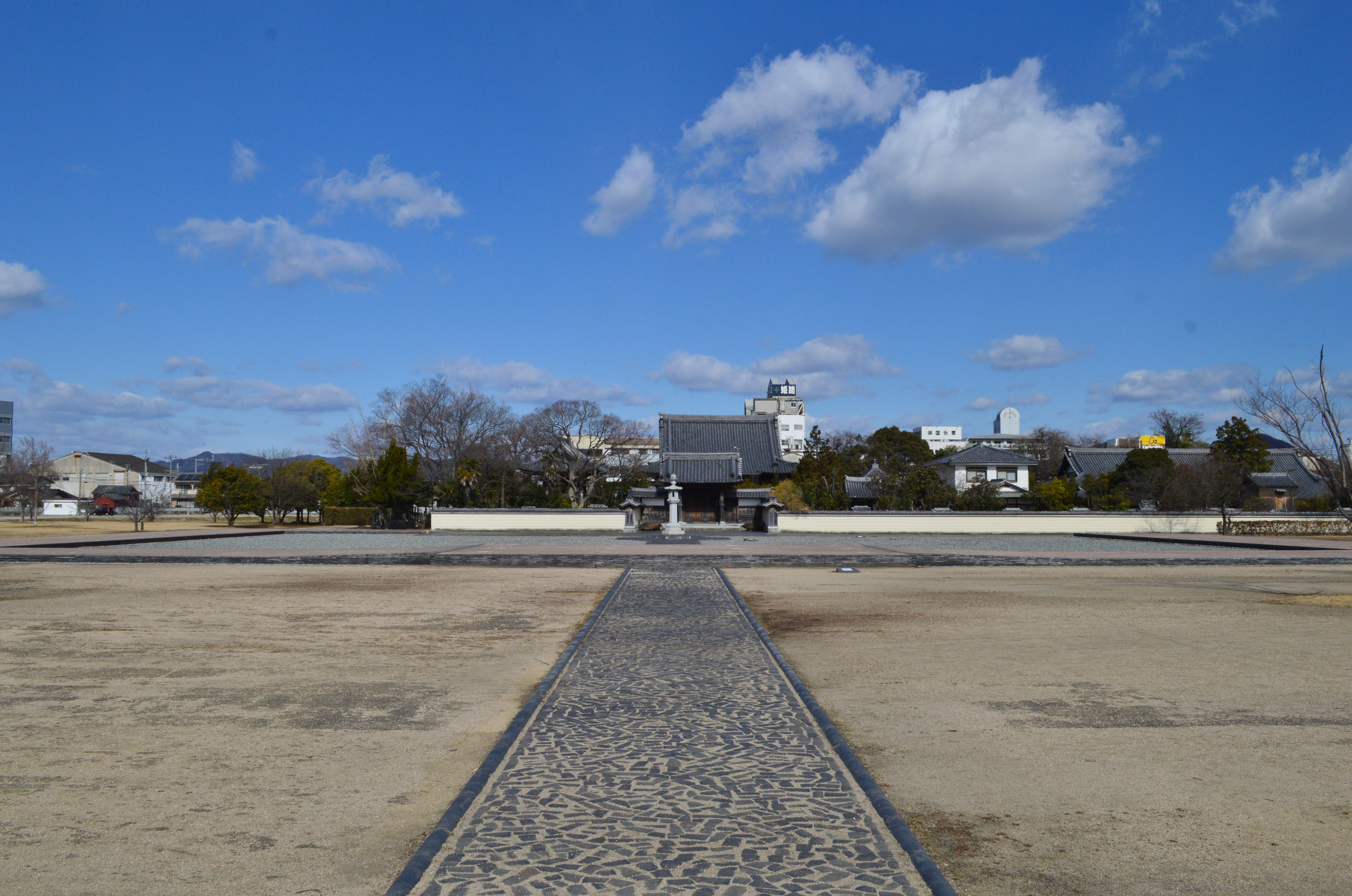
- Harima Kokubun-ji, ancient on left, modern in rear

- Harima Kokubun-ji Harima Kokubun-ji (Japan)

Religion
- Affiliation: Buddhist
- Rite: Shingon

Location
- Location: 121 Kokubunji, Mikunino-cho, Himeji-shi, Hyogo-ken
- Country: Japan
- Coordinates: 34°49′14.03″N 134°43′52.85″E

Architecture
- Founder: Emperor Shōmu
- Completed: c.741
- National Historic Site of Japan

Harima Kokubun-ji (播磨国分寺) is a Shingon-sect Buddhist temple in the Kokubunji neighborhood of the city of Himeji, Hyōgo, Japan. It claims to be the successor to the provincial temple established by Emperor Shōmu during the Nara period (710 – 794). Due to this connection, the foundation stones of the Nara period temple now located to the south of the present day complex were designated as a National Historic Site in 1921, with the area under protection was expanded in 1971 and 1985.

== History ==
The Shoku Nihongi records that in 741, as the country recovered from a major smallpox epidemic, Emperor Shōmu ordered that a monastery and nunnery be established in every province, the kokubunji (国分寺). These temples were built to a semi-standardized template, and served both to spread Buddhist orthodoxy to the provinces, and to emphasize the power of the Nara period centralized government under the Ritsuryō system.

The modern Harima Kokubun-ji is located on a river terrace on the left bank of the Ichi River in the southern part of Hyōgo Prefecture. The temple precincts overlap that of the ancient Kokubun-ji, which extended some 600 meters to the north, and faced the route of the ancient San'yōdō road to the south. The provincial capital was located about four kilometers to the west. This area was the center of Harima Province, and there are several large kofun burial mounds in the area. The first archaeological excavation of the site was conducted in 1921, and over the course of 13 subsequent excavations, the foundations of the major temple structures, such as the Kondō, Pagoda, Lecture Hall and Monk's quarters have been found.

The exact date of the construction of the temple is unknown, but is believed to be around the time of the 741 edict. The temple is listed in the 927 AD Engishiki as having an allotment of 40,000 bundles of rice. Based on excavated roof tiles, the temple survived to the end of the Heian period and was largely destroyed by fire. It appears to have continued on a much smaller scale until at least the beginning of the 13th century, but ts subsequent history is uncertain. In 1601, Himeji Domain donated a modest estate of 30 koku for its revival, and a bodaiji chapel of the Ikeda clan was relocated from Himeji castle to become the main hall of the reconstructed temple. A further 30 koku of revenues were donated by Shogun Tokugawa Iemitsu in 1648. This modern temple occupies the northern half of the ancient temple's precincts, including the site of the Kondō and Lecture Hall. The remaining portion of the site, including the ruins of the Pagoda, Middle Gate and Cloister, received protection as a National Historic Site in 1921, with the area under protection expanded twice, in 1971 and 1985, as excavations revealed additional finds. The southern half of the temple precincts were opened to the public as an archaeological park in 1992.

The ancient Harima Kokubun-ji occupied an enclosed compound about 218 square meters in area. The temple buildings were arranged in a straight line from south to north, with the Pagoda located in the southeast corner of the precincts. The Kondō overlaps the gate of the current temple. It was built on a platform 36.9 meters east–west and 23.4 meters north–south, but the details of the structure are unclear. A megalith placed in front of the current temple's gate is a cornerstone of the ancient Kondō. A platform for a stone lantern has also been found six meters to the south of the Kondō foundation platform. The Pagoda has a foundation 18.9 meters square, and 17 cornerstones have survived in situ. From the positioning, it is estimated that the Pagoda measured 9.3 meters on each side and was a seven-story structure. The site of the Lecture Hall in underneath the current temple's Main Hall, and so no detailed investigation could be performed. In addition to a large amount of roof tiles, Haji ware and Sue ware pottery has been excavated from the temple area, along with domestic glazed pottery, trade pottery, black pottery, inkstones, earthen weights, fences, gold and copper ornaments, sword hilts, grindstones, and bones have also been excavated.

== Gallery ==
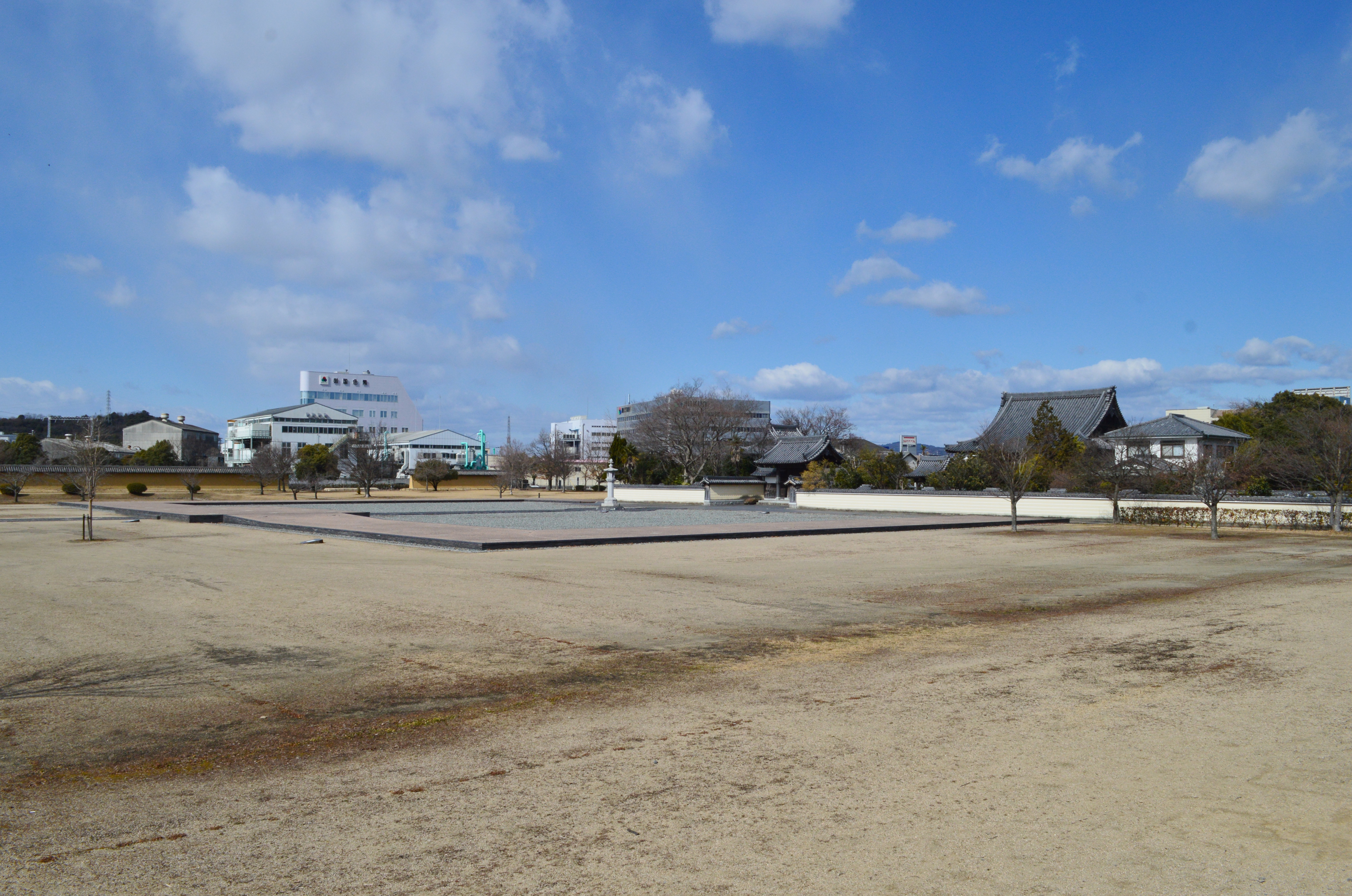
Overview

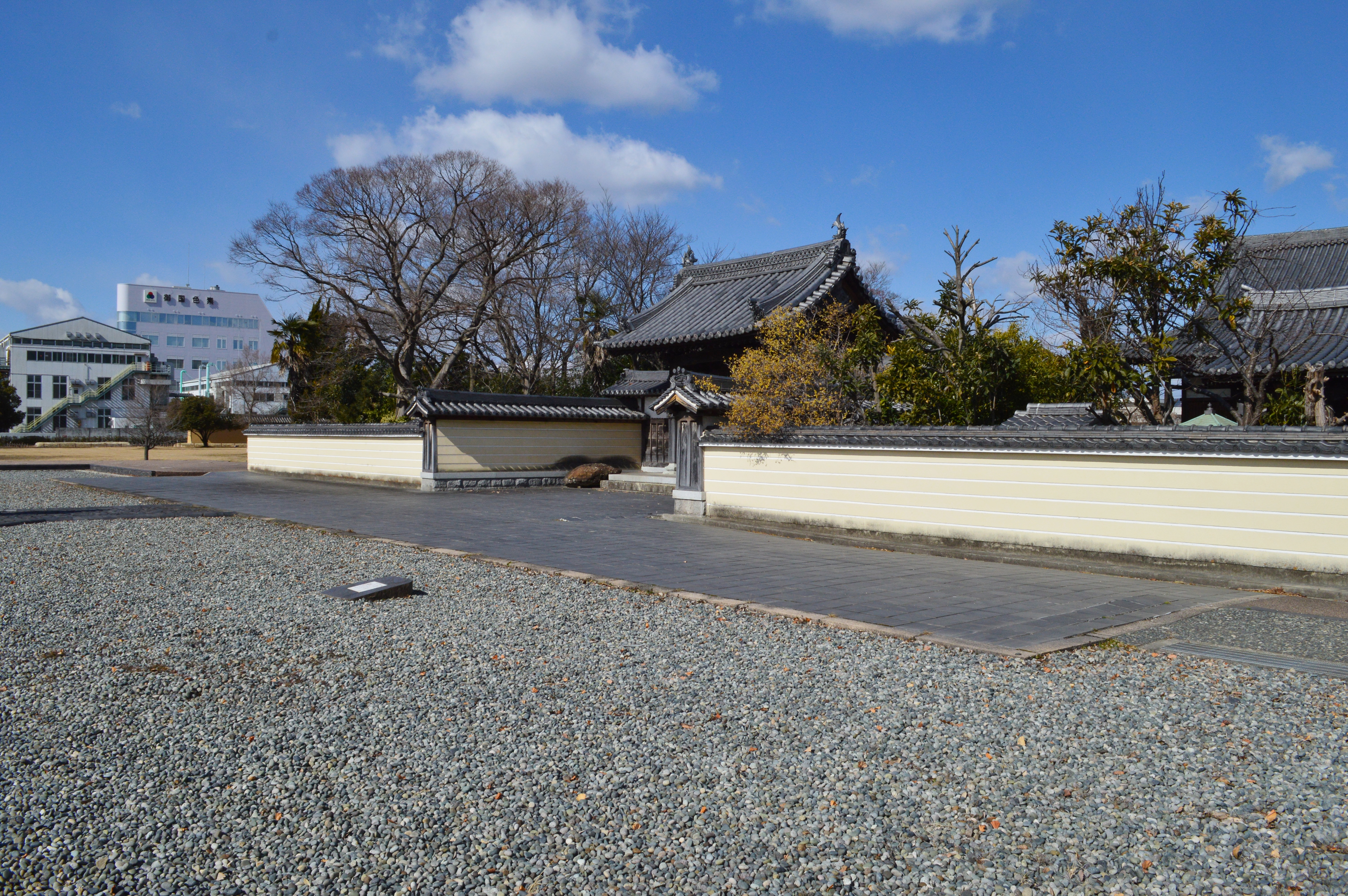
Site of the Kondō

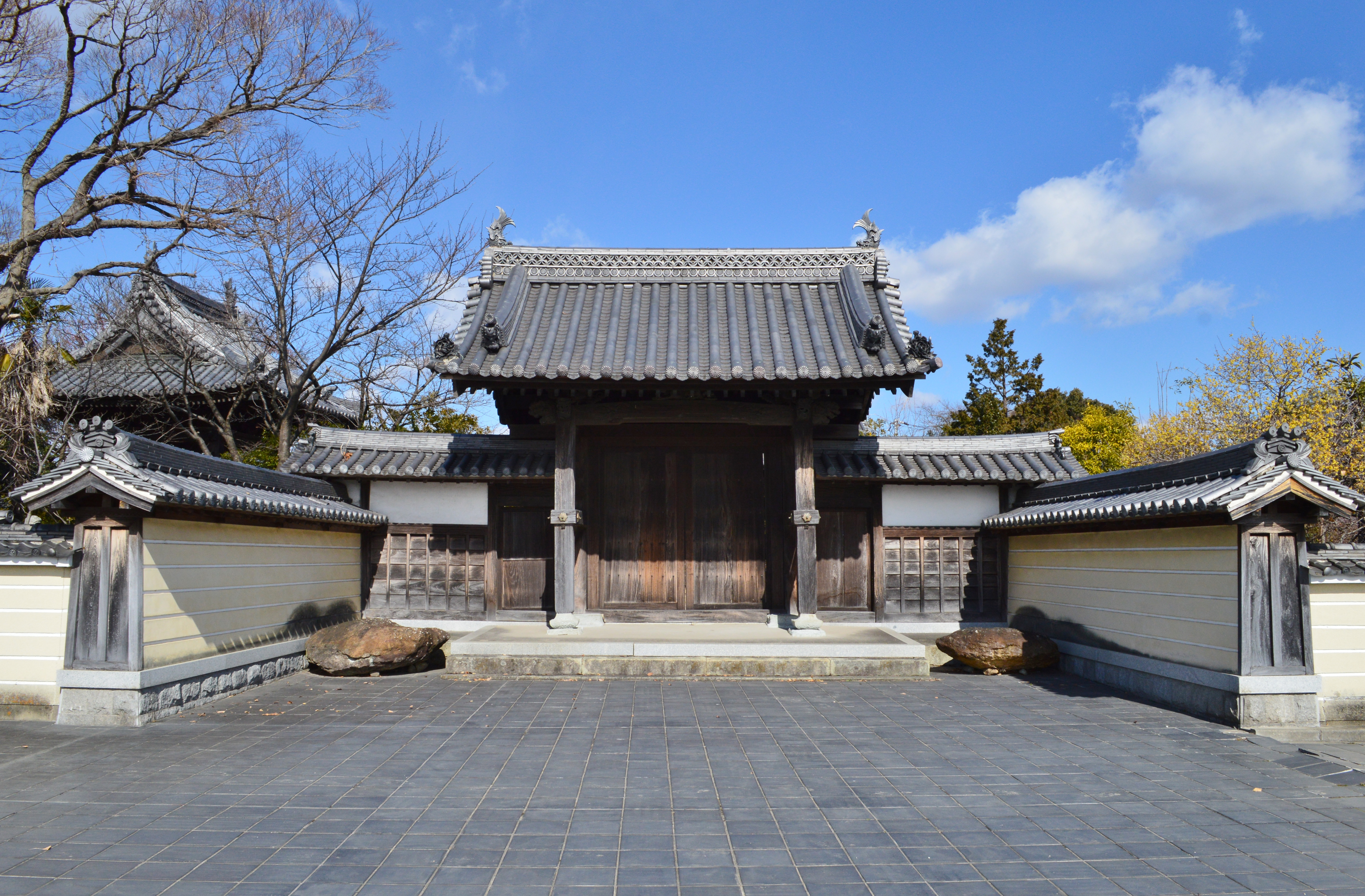
Modern gate with Foundation Stones of the Kondō

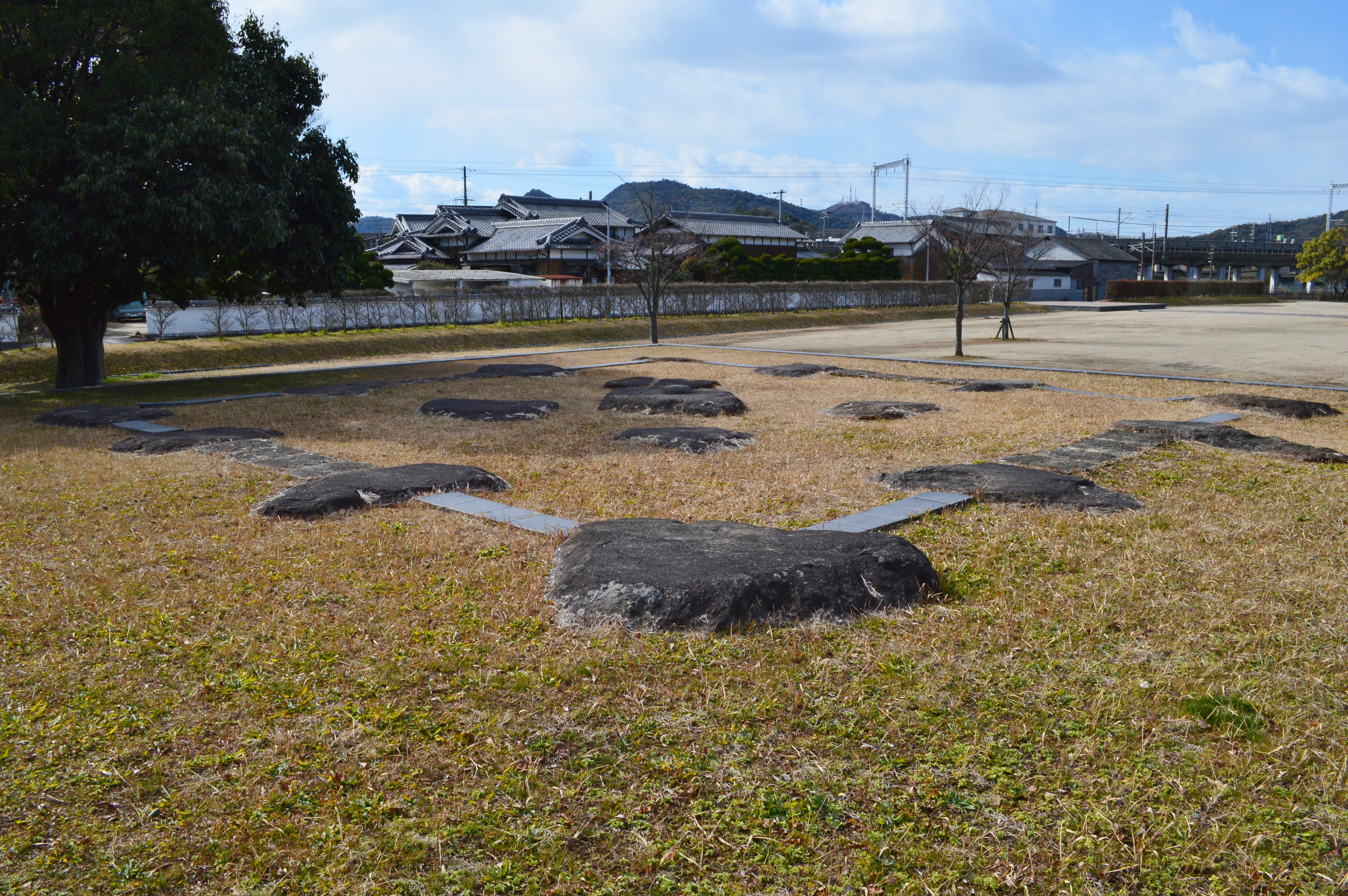
Site of the Pagoda

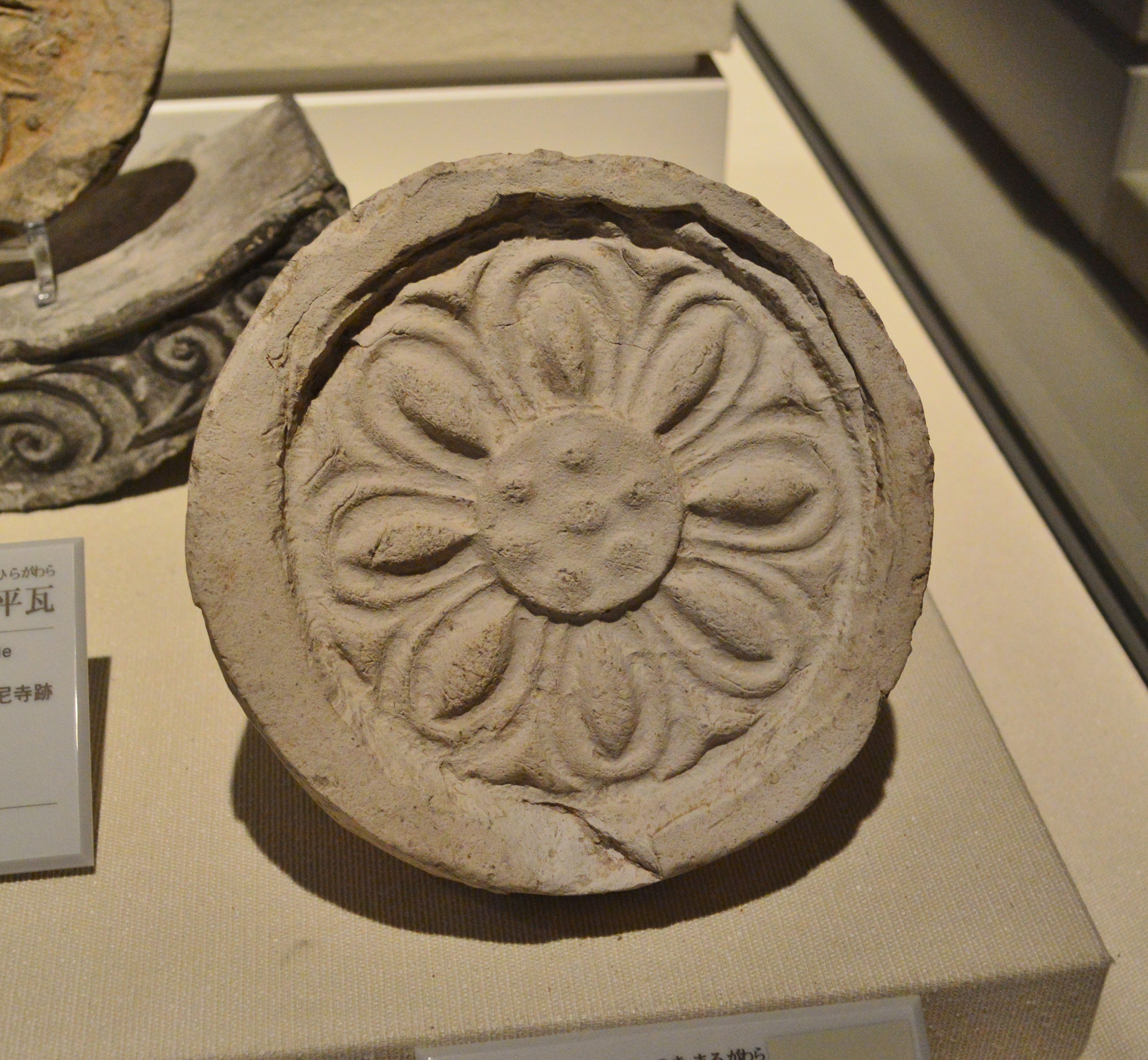
Roof tile

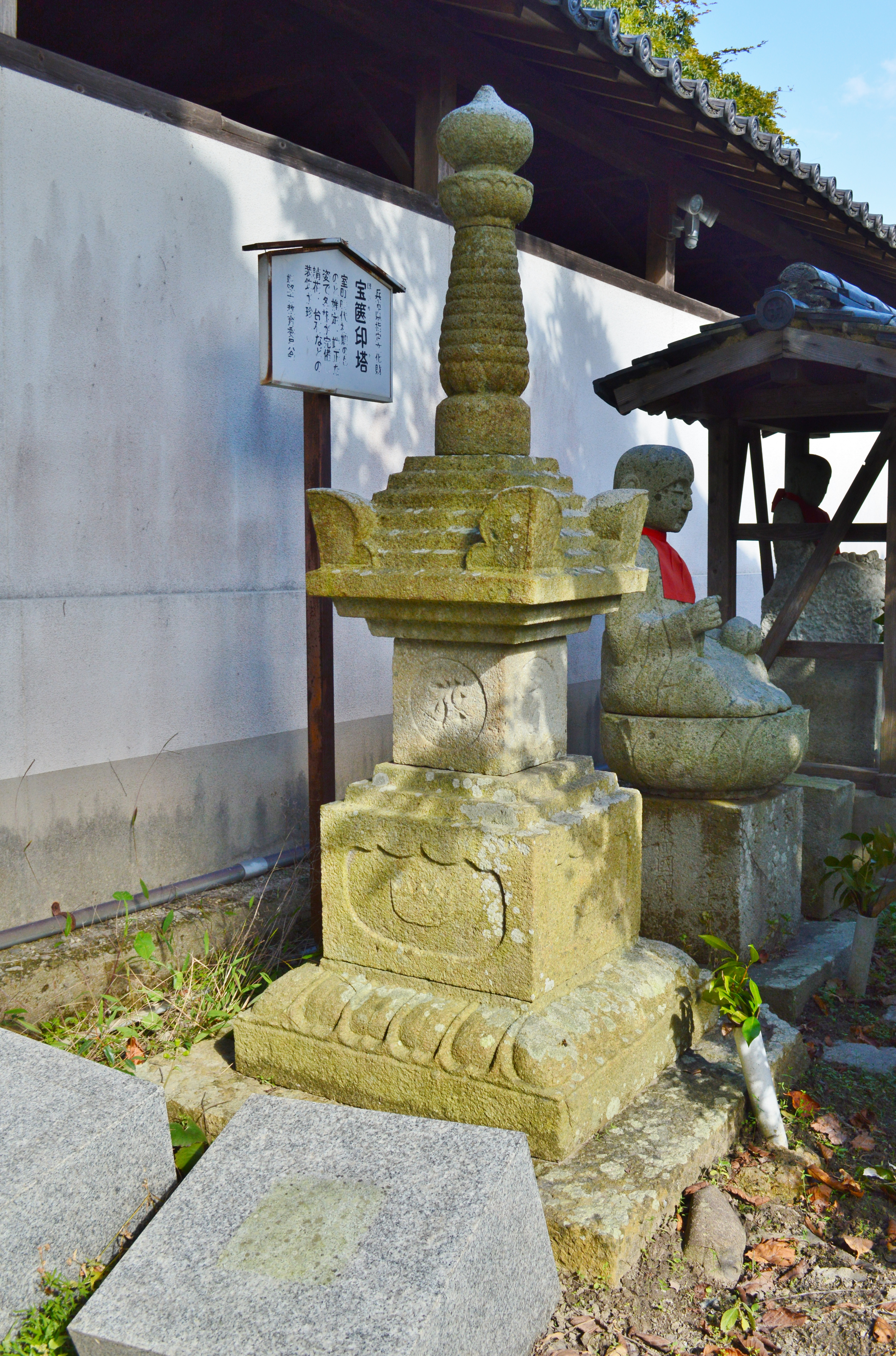

== Cultural Properties ==
=== Hyōgo Prefecture Designated Tangible Cultural Properties ===
- Stone Hōkyōintō pagoda (石造宝篋印塔), Muromachi period;

== See also ==
- List of Historic Sites of Japan (Hyōgo)
- Provincial temple
