= Harima-Katsuhara Station =

Railway station in Himeji, Hyōgo Prefecture, Japan

Harima-Katsuhara Station はりま勝原駅
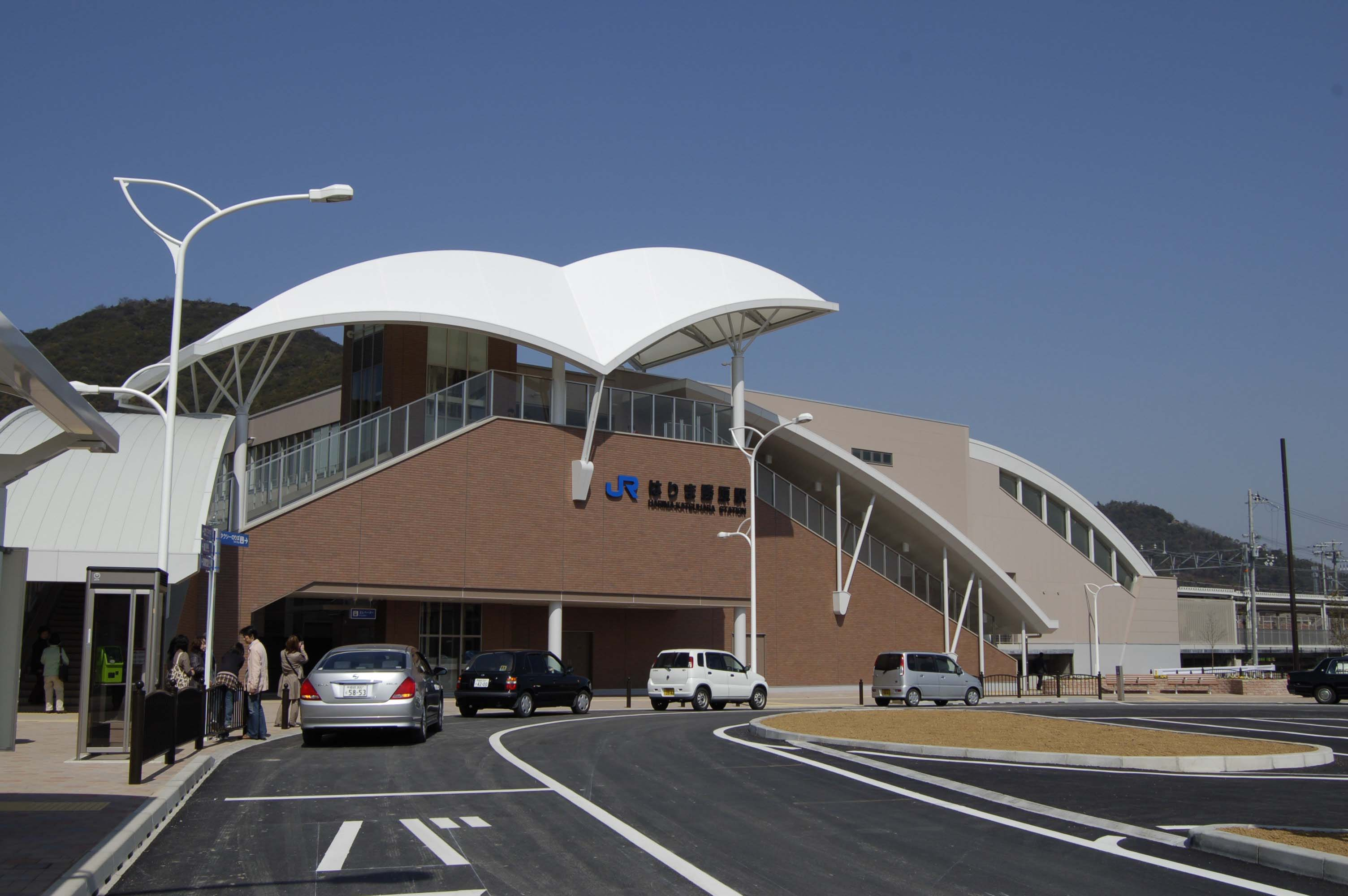
- Harima-Katsuhara Station in March 2008

General information
- Location: Kumami Katsuhara-ku, Himeji-shi, Hyōgo-ken 671-1211; Japan
- Coordinates: 34.810164°N 134.614075°E
- Owner: West Japan Railway Company
- Operator: West Japan Railway Company
- Line: San'yō Main Line
- Distance: 59.4 km (36.9 miles) from Kobe
- Platforms: 2 side platforms
- Connections: Bus stop

Other information
- Status: Staffed
- Website: Official website

History
- Opened: 15 March 2008

Passengers
- FY2019: 5507 daily
Location
- Location within Hyōgo Prefecture Location within Japan

Harima-Katsuhara Station (はりま勝原駅, Harima-Katsuhara-eki) is a passenger railway station located in the city of Himeji, Hyōgo Prefecture, Japan, operated by the West Japan Railway Company (JR West).

== Lines ==
Harima-Katsuhara Station is served by the JR San'yō Main Line, and is located 62.2 kilometers from the terminus of the line at Kobe and 95.35 kilometers from Osaka.

== Station layout ==
The station consists of two opposed ground-level side platforms connected by an elevated station building. The station is staffed.

=== Platforms ===
1	■ San'yō Main Line	for Kamigōri and Okayama
2, 3	■ San'yō Main Line	for Himeji and Osaka

== Adjacent stations ==
«	Service	»
JR West
Sanyō Main Line (JR Kobe Line)
Limited Express Super Hakuto: Does not stop at this station
Agaho	Special Rapid	Aboshi
Agaho	Local; Rapid service: Nishi-Akashi or Akashi - Takatsuki or Kyoto	Aboshi

== History ==
Harima-Katsuhara Station was opened on 15 March 2008.

== Passenger statistics ==
In fiscal 2019, the station was used by an average of 5,507 passengers daily

== Surrounding area ==
- Hyogo Prefectural Himeji Minami High School

== See also ==
- List of railway stations in Japan
