= Himeji-Bessho Station =

Railway station in Himeji, Hyōgo Prefecture, Japan

Himeji-Bessho Station ひめじ別所駅
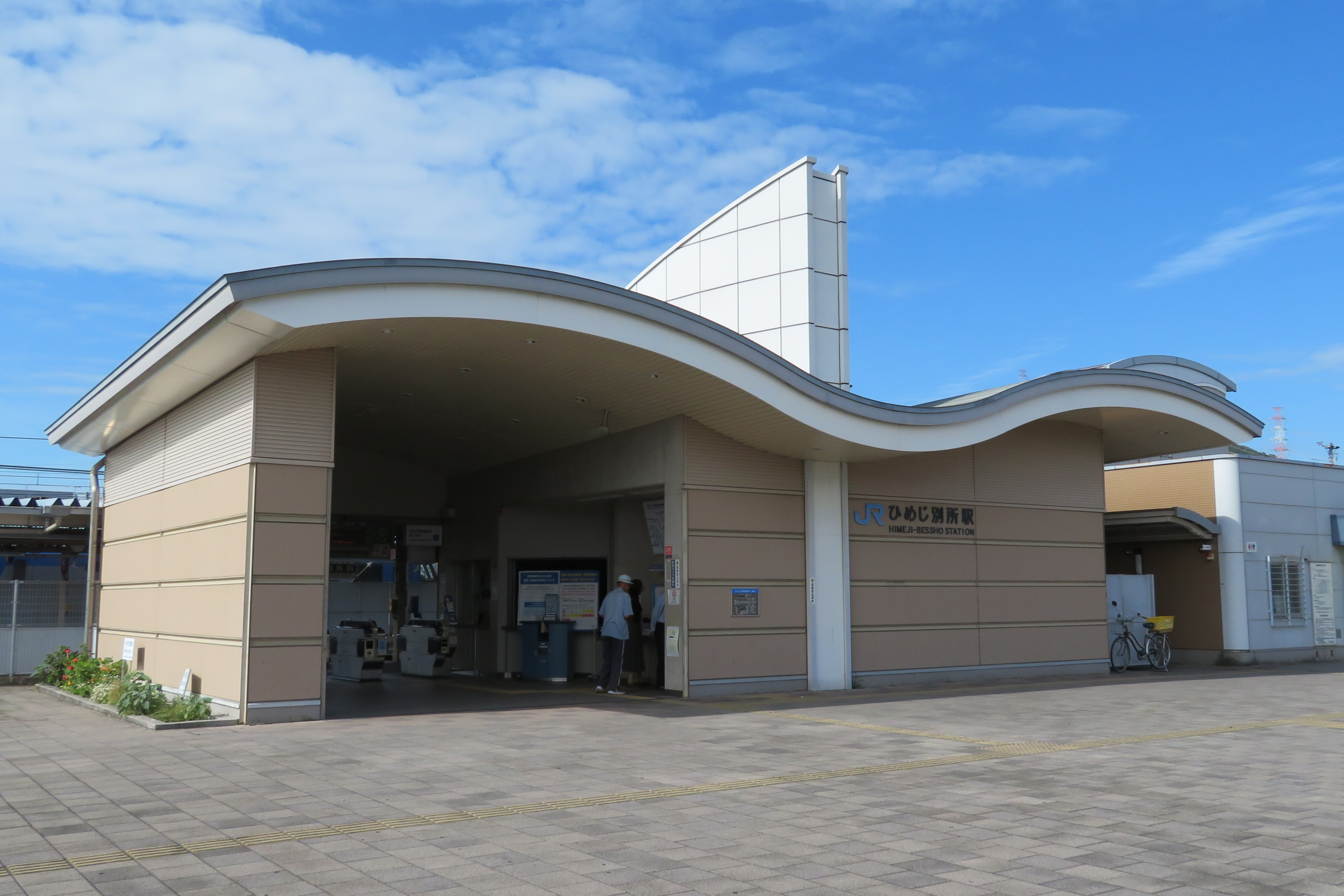
- Himeji-Bessho Station, September 2019

General information
- Location: Imaike1571-1 Bessho-chō Bessho, Himeji-shi, Hyōgo-ken 671-0221; Japan
- Coordinates: 34°48′20″N 134°45′12″E
- Owner: West Japan Railway Company
- Operator: West Japan Railway Company
- Line: San'yō Main Line
- Distance: 48.4 km (30.1 miles) from Kobe
- Platforms: 2 side platforms
- Tracks: 2
- Connections: Bus stop

Construction
- Structure type: Ground level
- Accessible: Yes

Other information
- Status: Staffed
- Station code: JR-A82
- Website: Official website

History
- Opened: 1 March 2005

Passengers
- FY2019: 1924 daily

Services
Preceding station	JR West	Following station
Gochaku towards Himeji	JR Kōbe Line Rapid	Sone towards Ōsaka
Location
- Location within Hyōgo Prefecture Location within Japan

Himeji-Bessho Station (ひめじ別所駅, Himeji-Bessho-eki) is a passenger railway station located in the city of Himeji, Hyōgo Prefecture, Japan, operated by the West Japan Railway Company (JR West). The station was opened on March 1, 2005, on the north-east side of Himeji Freight Station (姫路貨物駅) operated by Japan Freight Railway Company (JR Freight).

== Lines ==
Himeji-Bessho Station is served by the JR San'yō Main Line, and is located 48.4 kilometers from the terminus of the line at Kobe and 81.5 kilometers from Osaka.

== Station layout ==
The station consists of two ground-level side platforms connected by a footbridge. The station is staffed.

=== Platforms ===
1	■ San'yō Main Line	for Sannomiya and Osaka
2	■ San'yō Main Line	for Kakogawa and Himeji

== History ==
Himeji-Bessho Station was opened on 1 March 2005 as an infill station.

Station numbering was introduced in March 2018 with Himeji-Bessho being assigned station number JR-A82.

== Passenger statistics ==
In fiscal 2019, the station was used by an average of 1924 passengers daily

== Surrounding area ==
- Japan National Route 2
- Himeji City Higashi Junior High School
- Hyogo Prefectural Himeji Bessho High School
- Hakuryo Junior and Senior High School

== See also ==
- List of railway stations in Japan
