= Kasumigaoka Station =

Kasumigaoka Station is the name of two train stations in Japan:

- Kasumigaoka Station (Hyōgo)
- Kasumigaoka Station (Nara)

== See also ==
- Kokuritsu-Kyōgijō Station, for the Japan National Stadium
