= Higashi-Tarumi Station =

Railway station in Kobe, Japan

Higashi-Tarumi Station 東垂水駅
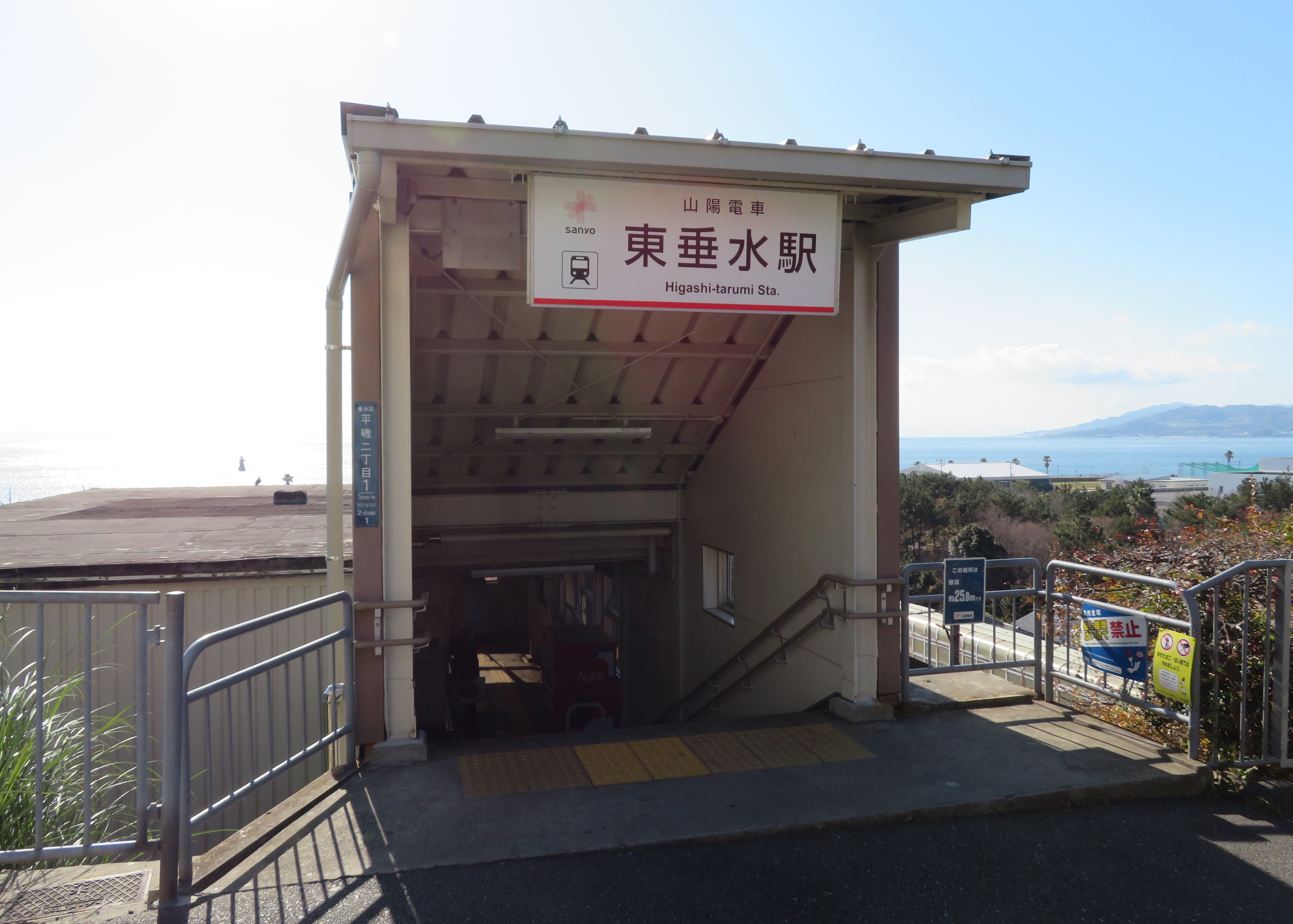
- Higashi-Tarumi Station, January 2019

General information
- Location: 2-chōme-1 Hiraiso, Tarumi-ku, Kobe-shi, Hyōgo-ken 655-0892; Japan
- Coordinates: 34.6292°N 135.0636°E
- Operator: Sanyo Electric Railway
- Line: ■ Main Line
- Distance: 8.6 km from Nishidai
- Platforms: 2 side platforms
- Connections

Other information
- Station code: SY10
- Website: Official website

History
- Opened: 12 April 1917

Passengers
- FY2019: 767 (boarding only)
Location
- Location within Hyōgo Prefecture Location within Japan

Higashi-Tarumi Station (東垂水駅, Higashi-Tarumi-eki) is a passenger railway station located in Tarumi-ku, Kobe, Hyōgo Prefecture, Japan, operated by the private Sanyo Electric Railway.

== Lines ==
Higashi-Tarumi Station is served by the Sanyo Electric Railway Main Line and is 8.6 kilometers from the terminus of the line at Nishidai.

== Station layout ==
The station consists of two opposed side platforms connected by an elevated station building. The station is unattended.

=== Platforms ===
sea side	■ Main Line	for Sanyo Akashi, Sanyo Himeji and Sanyo-Aboshi
mountain side	■ Main Line	for Sannomiya and Osaka

== Adjacent stations ==
«	Service	»
Sanyo Electric Railway
Main Line
Limited Express: Does not stop at this station
S Limited Express: Does not stop at this station
Takinochaya	Local	Sanyo Tarumi

== History ==
Higashi-Tarumi Station opened on April 12, 1917.

== Passenger statistics ==
In fiscal 2018, the station was used by an average of 767 passengers daily (boarding passengers only).

== Surrounding area ==
- Higashi Tarumi Observatory Park
- Hiraiso Kaizuri Park
- Tarumi Sports Garden Multipurpose Ground

== See also ==
- List of railway stations in Japan
