= Takinochaya Station =

Railway station in Kobe, Japan

Takinochaya Station 滝の茶屋駅
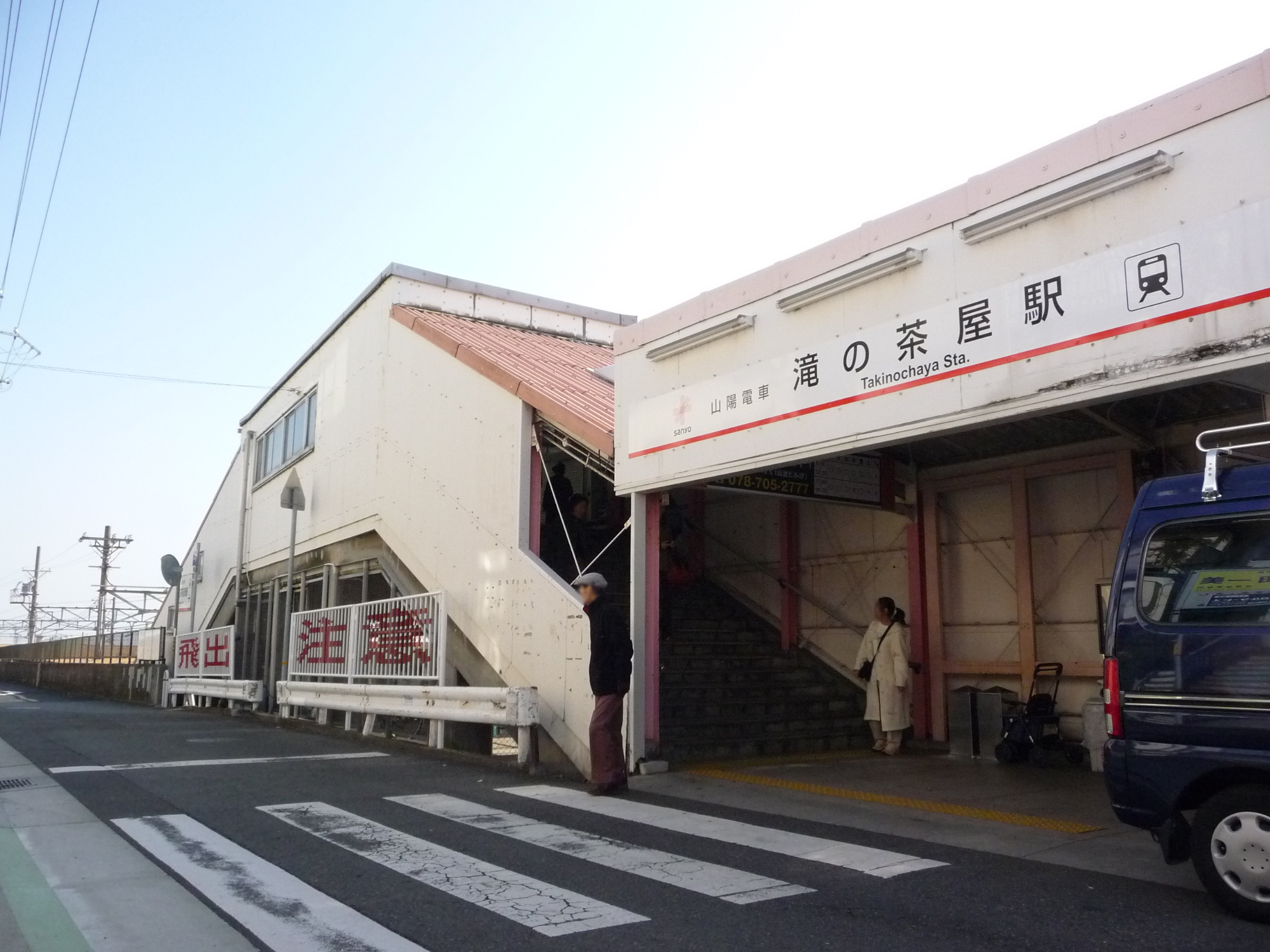
- Takinochaya Station, December 2008

General information
- Location: 1-chōme-1 Shirogayama, Tarumi-ku, Kobe-shi, Hyōgo-ken 655-0884; Japan
- Coordinates: 34.6309303°N 135.0720549°E
- Operator: Sanyo Electric Railway
- Line: ■ Main Line
- Distance: 7.8 km from Nishidai
- Platforms: 2 side platforms
- Connections

Other information
- Station code: SY09
- Website: Official website

History
- Opened: 12 April 1917

Passengers
- FY2019: 2814 (boarding only)
Location
- Location within Hyōgo Prefecture Location within Japan

Takinochaya Station (滝の茶屋駅, Takinochaya-eki) is a passenger railway station located in Tarumi-ku, Kobe, Hyōgo Prefecture, Japan, operated by the private Sanyo Electric Railway.

== Lines ==
Takinochaya Station is served by the Sanyo Electric Railway Main Line and is 7.8 kilometers from the terminus of the line at Nishidai.

== Station layout ==
The station consists of two unnumbered side platforms connected by an elevated station building.

=== Platforms ===
south	■ Main Line	for Sanyo Akashi, Sanyo Himeji and Sanyo-Aboshi
north	■ Main Line	for Sannomiya and Osaka

== Adjacent stations ==
«	Service	»
Sanyo Electric Railway
Sanyo Shioya	Local	Higashi-Tarumi
Sanyo Suma	S Limited Express	Sanyo Tarumi
Sanyo Suma	Through Limited Express (eastbound: first - morning) (westbound: evening - last)	Sanyo Tarumi

== History ==
Takinochaya Station opened on April 12, 1917.

== Passenger statistics ==
In fiscal 2018, the station was used by an average of 2814 passengers daily (boarding passengers only).

== Surrounding area ==
- Hyogo Prefectural Visual Special Needs School
- Kobe Municipal Higashi Tarumizu Elementary School

== See also ==
- List of railway stations in Japan
