= Sanyo-Tarumi Station =

Railway station in Kobe, Japan

Sanyo Tarumi Station 山陽垂水駅
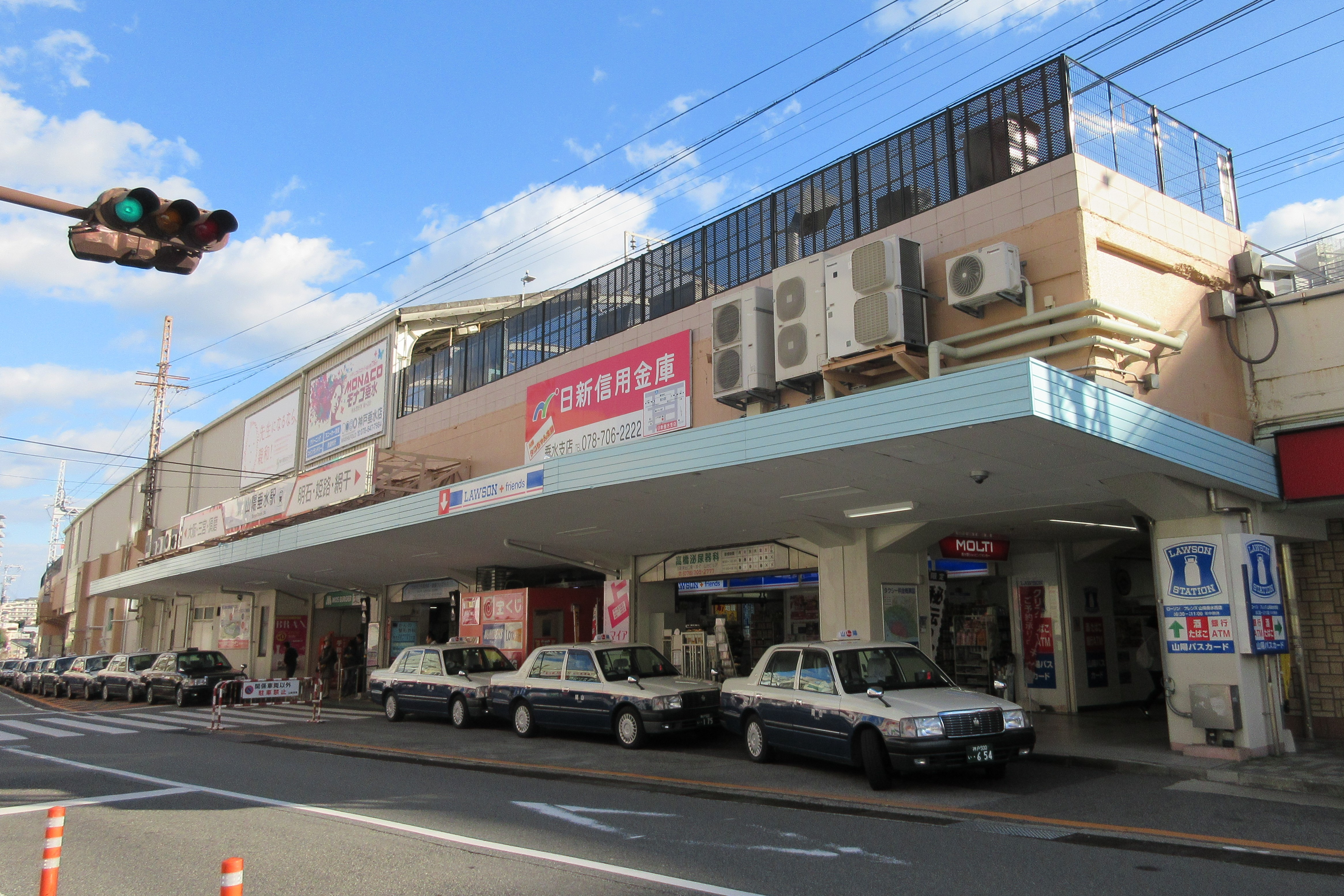
- Sanyo Tarumi Station, November 2017

General information
- Location: 1-37 Kanda-cho, Tarumi-ku, Kobe-shi, Hyōgo-ken 655-0027; Japan
- Coordinates: 34.6295355°N 135.0536442°E
- Operator: Sanyo Electric Railway
- Line: ■ Main Line
- Distance: 9.6 km from Nishidai
- Platforms: 2 side platforms
- Connections

Other information
- Station code: SY11
- Website: Official website

History
- Opened: 12 April 1917
- Former names: Tarumi (to 1943); Dentetsu-Tarumi (to 1991)

Passengers
- FY2019: 5761 (boarding only)
Location
- Location within Hyōgo Prefecture Location within Japan

Sanyo-Tarumi Station (山陽垂水駅, Sanyō Tarumi-eki) is a passenger railway station located in Tarumi-ku, Kobe, Hyōgo Prefecture, Japan, operated by the private Sanyo Electric Railway.

== Lines ==
Sanyo-Tarumi Station is served by the Sanyo Electric Railway Main Line and is 9.6 kilometers from the terminus of the line at Nishidai.

== Station layout ==
The station consists of two elevated side platforms with the station building underneath.

=== Platforms ===
1	■ Main Line	for Sanyo-Akashi, Sanyo-Himeji and Sanyo-Aboshi
2	■ Main Line	for Sannomiya and Osaka

== Adjacent stations ==
«	Service	»
Sanyo Electric Railway
Sanyo Electric Railway Main Line
Higashi-Tarumi	Local	Kasumigaoka
Takinochaya	S Limited Express	Kasumigaoka
Takinochaya (eastbound: first - morning) (westbound: evening - last); Sanyo-Suma (others)	Through Limited Express	Maiko-kōen

== History ==
Sanyo-Tarumi Station opened on April 12, 1917 as Tarumi Station (垂水駅). It was renamed Dentetsu Tarumi Station (電鉄垂水駅) on November 20, 1943, and renamed to its present name on April 7,1991.

== Passenger statistics ==
In fiscal 2018, the station was used by an average of 5761 passengers daily (boarding passengers only).

== Surrounding area ==
- JR Tarumi Station
- Tarumi Ward Office
- Watatsumi Shrine

== See also ==
- List of railway stations in Japan
