= Goshikizuka (Sentsubo) Kofun =

Kofun period burial mound cluster in Kobe, Japan

Goshikizuka Kofun
- 五色塚古墳 (Japanese)
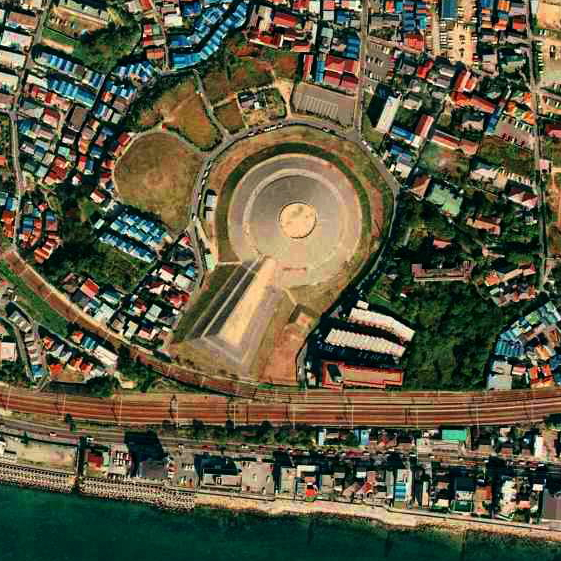
- Goshikizuka Kofun

- Goshikizuka Kofun Goshikizuka (Sentsubo) Kofun (Japan)
- 34°37′46.6″N 135°2′45.08″E
- Type: Kofun
- Periods: Kofun period
- Location: Tarumi-ku, Kobe, Japan
- Region: Kansai region

History
- Built: late 4th - mid-5th century AD

Site notes
- Public access: Yes
- National Historic Site of Japan

The Goshikizuka Kofun (五色塚古墳) is a kofun burial mound located in the Goshikiyama neighborhood of Tarumi-ku, Kobe, Hyōgo Prefecture, in the Kansai region of Japan. The tumulus is the largest in Hyōgo Prefecture, and is estimated to have been built around the end of the 4th century and the beginning of the 5th century (mid-Kofun period). It is known as the first kofun to be restored to what archaeologists believe to be its original appearance. It is also known as the Sentsubo Kofun (千壺古墳) . Together with the smaller neighboring Kotsubo Kofun (小壺古墳) it was designated a National Historic Site in 1921, with the area under protection extended in 1974, 1979 and 2006.

== Overview ==
The Goshikizuka Kofun is a zenpō-kōen-fun (前方後円墳), which is shaped like a keyhole, having one square end and one circular end, when viewed from above. It is located at the southern end of the Tarumi hill in the western part of Kobe city, overlooking the Akashi Strait on the Seto Inland Sea and Awaji Island, and is orientated to the south. The origins the name "Goshikizuka" is unknown, but dates to at least the early Edo Period, when the tumulus was believed to have been the tomb of Emperor Chuai. The name "sentsubo" is from the vast number of haniwa on the site. The tumulus area was protected for centuries as it was in a pine forest; however, the trees were harvested in World War II and the area was cleared for fields and urban development after the end of the war. The tracks of the San'yō Main Line railway passing's front of anterior portion of the tumulus, and construction of roads has destroyed a portion of the surrounding moats.

Structurally, the tumulus is built in three tiers. The length of the tumulus is 194 meters. Cylindrical haniwa rows are laid on each tier of the mound, and fukiishi on each step slope. The number of haniwa is estimated to be over 2200 and the number of fukiishi is estimated to be approximately 2.23 million (2784 tons), with the upper and middle stones coming from the northeastern coast of Awaji Island. The tumulus is surrounded by double deep moats with shallow external ditches, and inside the moat are three square island-shaped mounds on the left and right of the main tumulus constriction and northeast of the posterior circular portion. The burial chamber is not clear, but it is believed to be a pit-type stone chamber as fragments of crystalline schist originating in Tokushima Prefecture have been found. It is unclear for whom this tomb was constructed, but it is believed to have been for a ruler who controlled both sides of Akashi Strait. In construction method and scale, it is comparable to the royal tombs of Yamato. The dimensions of the tumulus are almost identical to the Sakiryoyama Kofun in Nara. As the surrounding area does not appear to have had the economic base for such a construction, it is also theorized that this indicates a strong connection with the Yamato Kingdom. The Nihon Shoki mentions a large tumulus being constructed in this area during the reign of Empress Jingū, but states that it was a "fake tomb" without an actual burial.

The tumulus was excavated from 1965 to 1974, 1977, and 1982 to 1993. In 2012, the excavated items (the cylindrical haniwa group) were collectively designated as National Important Cultural Property. Most of the excavated items are stored at the Kobe City Archaeological Center.

== Kotsubo Kofun ==
The Kotsubo Kofun is large circular enpun (円墳)-style mound, with a diameter of 70 meters, and height of 8.5 meters, making it the second largest enpun in the prefecture after the Chasuriyama Kofun in Asago. It was constructed in two tiers and was surrounded by a moat. It had an estimated 320 haniwa in two rows, including cylindrical, morning glory-shaped, and figurative haniwa, but unlike the Goshikizuka Kofun, no fukiishi were found. From the haniwa, the tumulus is estimated to be contemporary with the Goshikizuka Kofun, or from around the end of the 4th century and the beginning of the 5th century, but it is not clear which was constructed first. According to literature, the surrounding area once had a number of other large enpun burial mounds, but these have since been destroyed.

The site is open to the public as an archaeological park, and is located about a ten-minute walk from Kasumigaoka Station on the Sanyo Electric Railway Main Line or 15-minutes from Tarumi Station on the JR West San'yō Main Line

Name	Location	Type	Size
Goshikizuka Kofun	34°37′46.6″N 135°2′45.08″E	keyhole	length 194m posterior circular portion: 125.5 m dia anterior width:82.4m
Kotsubo Kofun	34°37′49″N 135°2′41.49″E	Circular	dia 70.0m height 8.5m

== Gallery ==
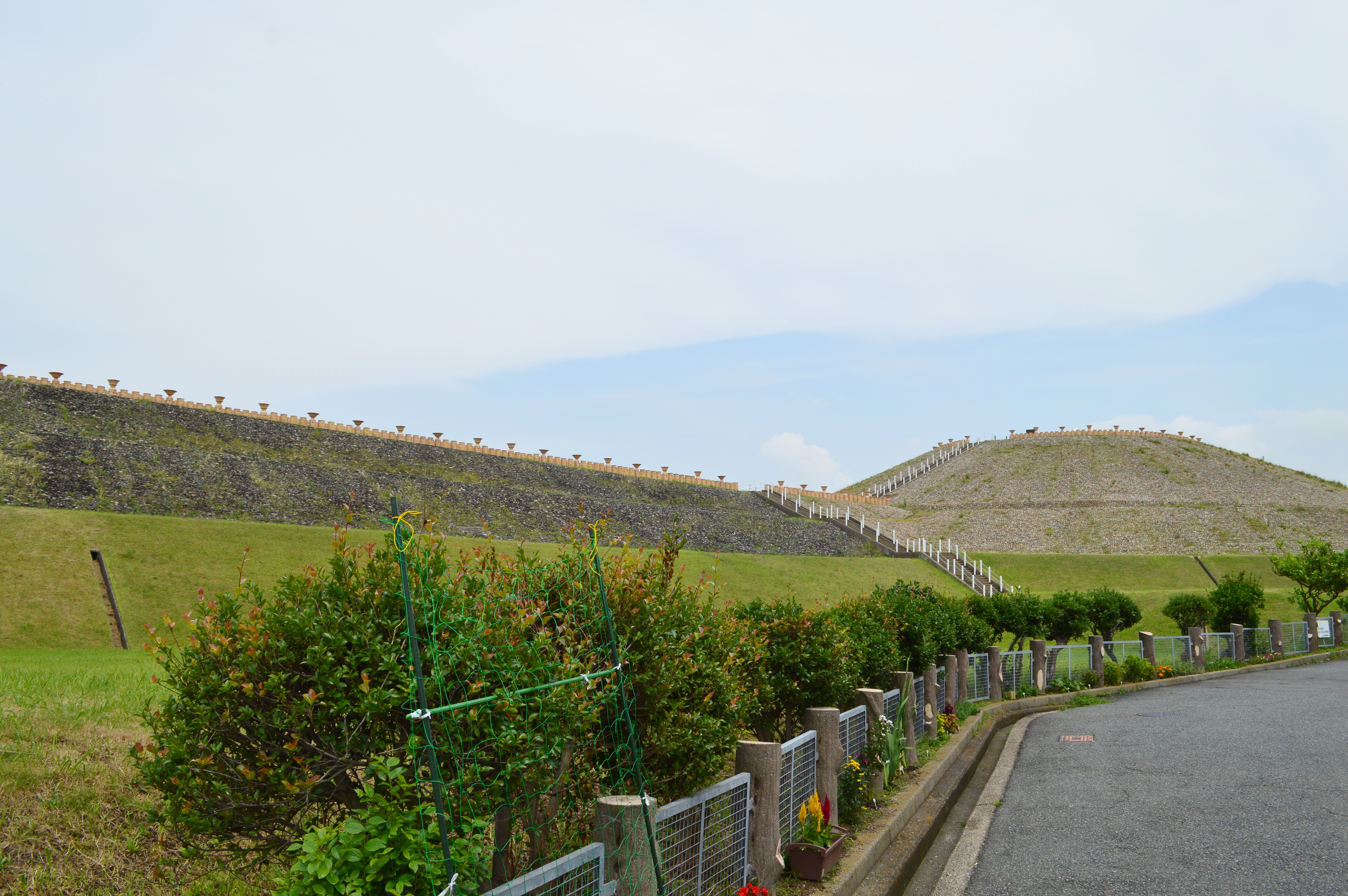
Goshikizuka Kofun

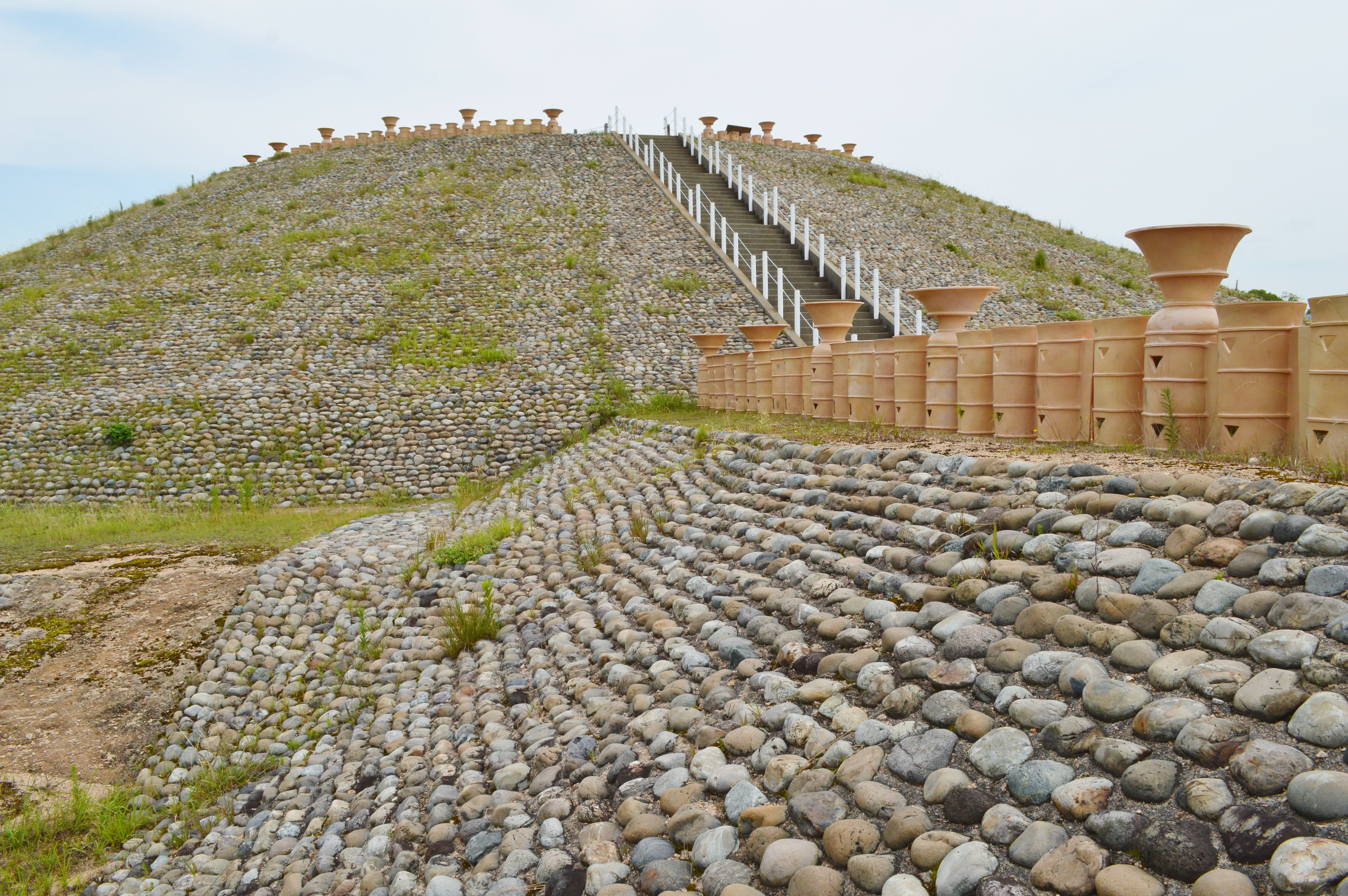
Goshikizuka Kofun, haniwa and fukiishi

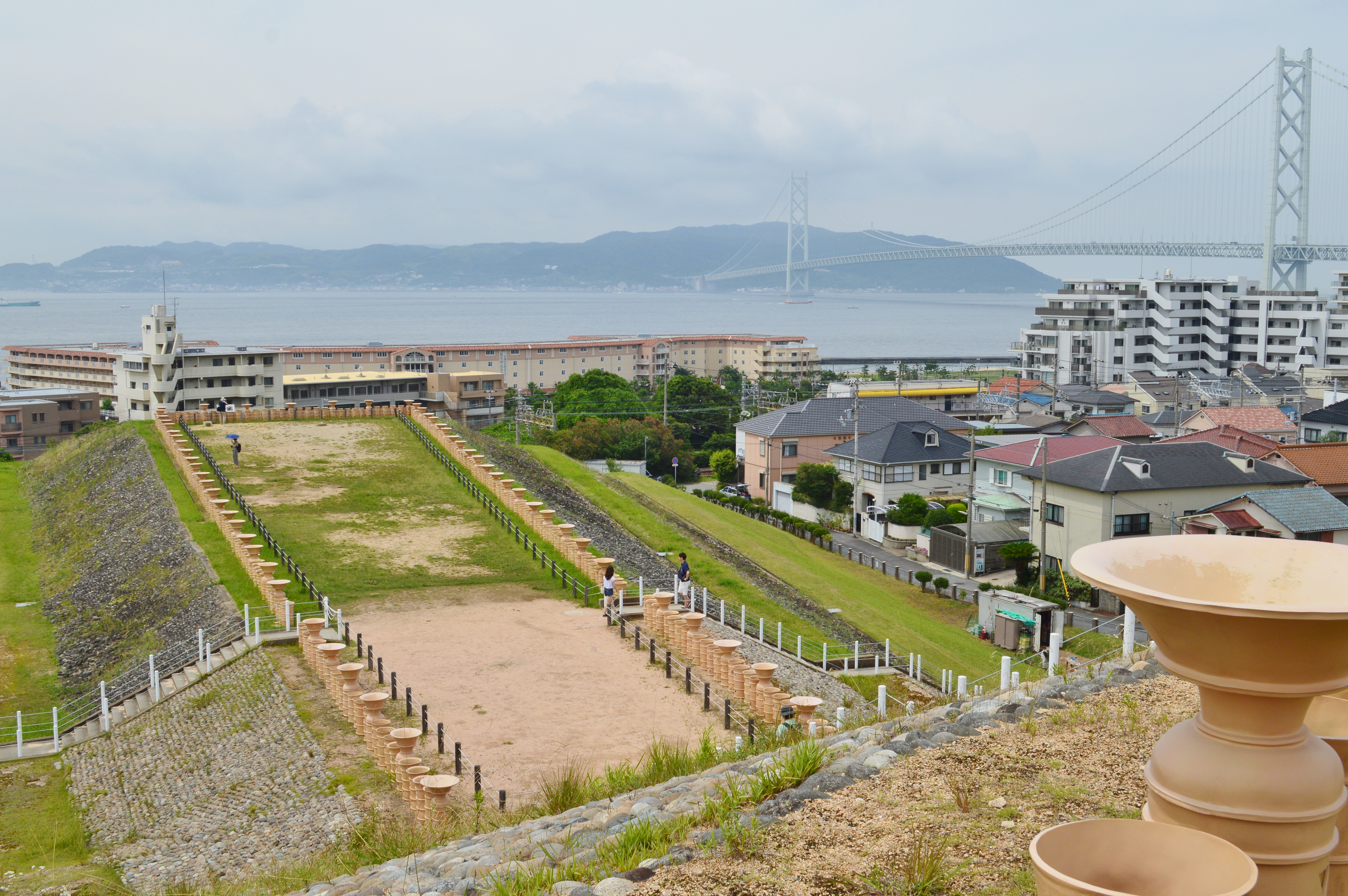
Awaji Island and Akashi Strait from Goshikuzuka Kofun

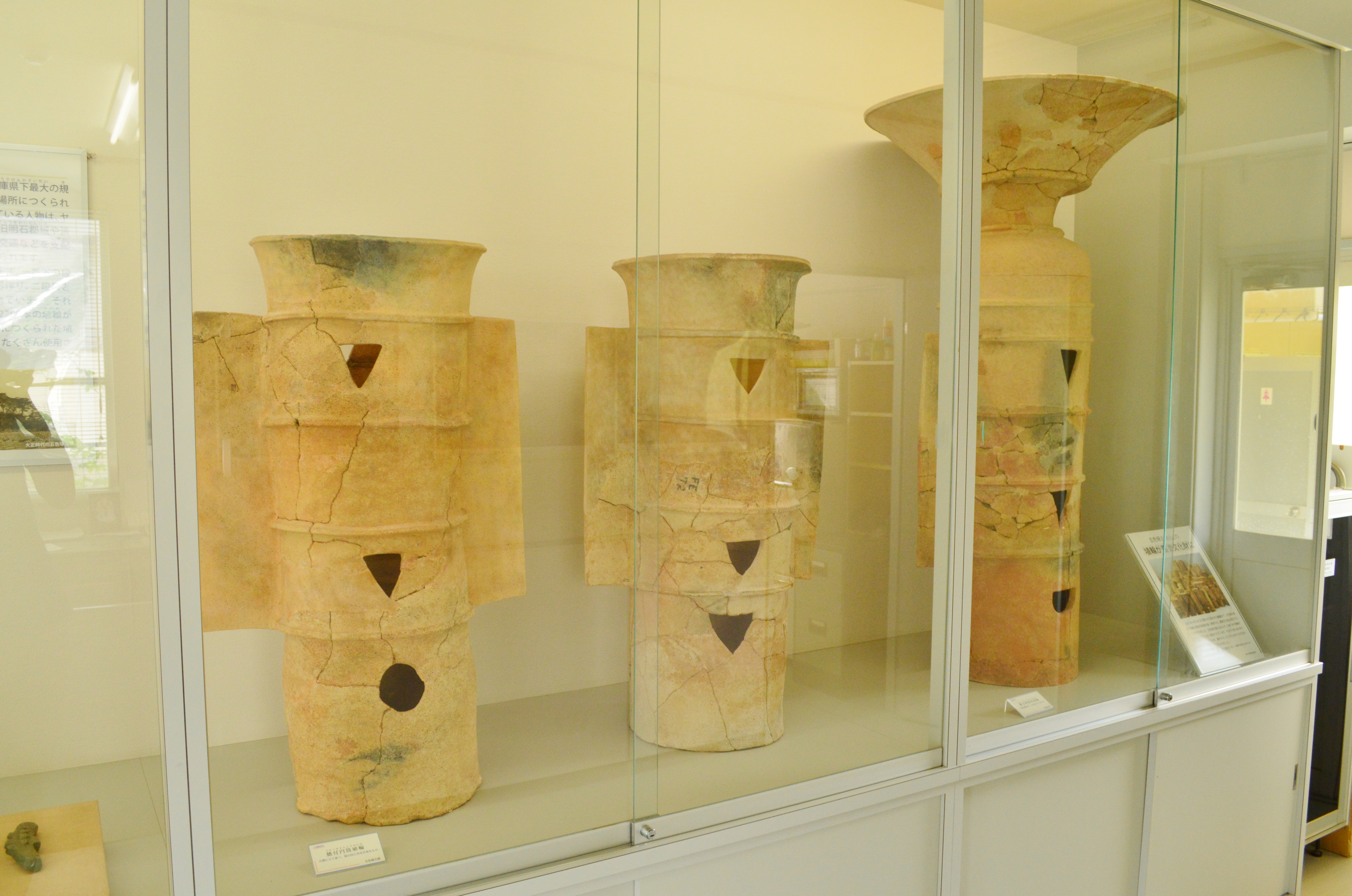
Haniwa from Goshikizuka Kofun

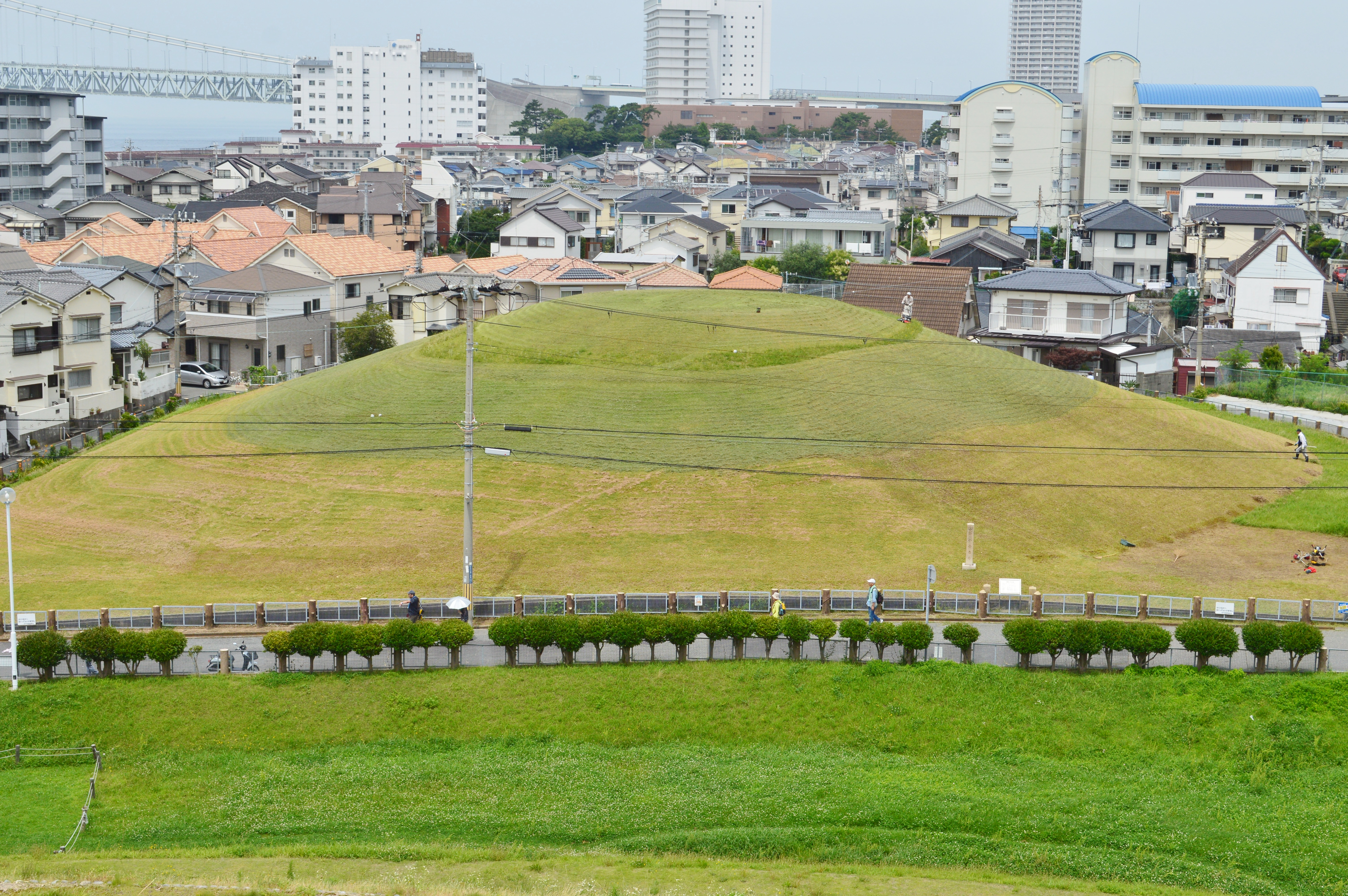
Kotsubo Kofun

== See also ==
- List of Historic Sites of Japan (Hyōgo)
