= Kasumigaoka Station (Hyōgo) =

Railway station in Kobe, Japan

Kasumigaoka Station 霞ヶ丘駅
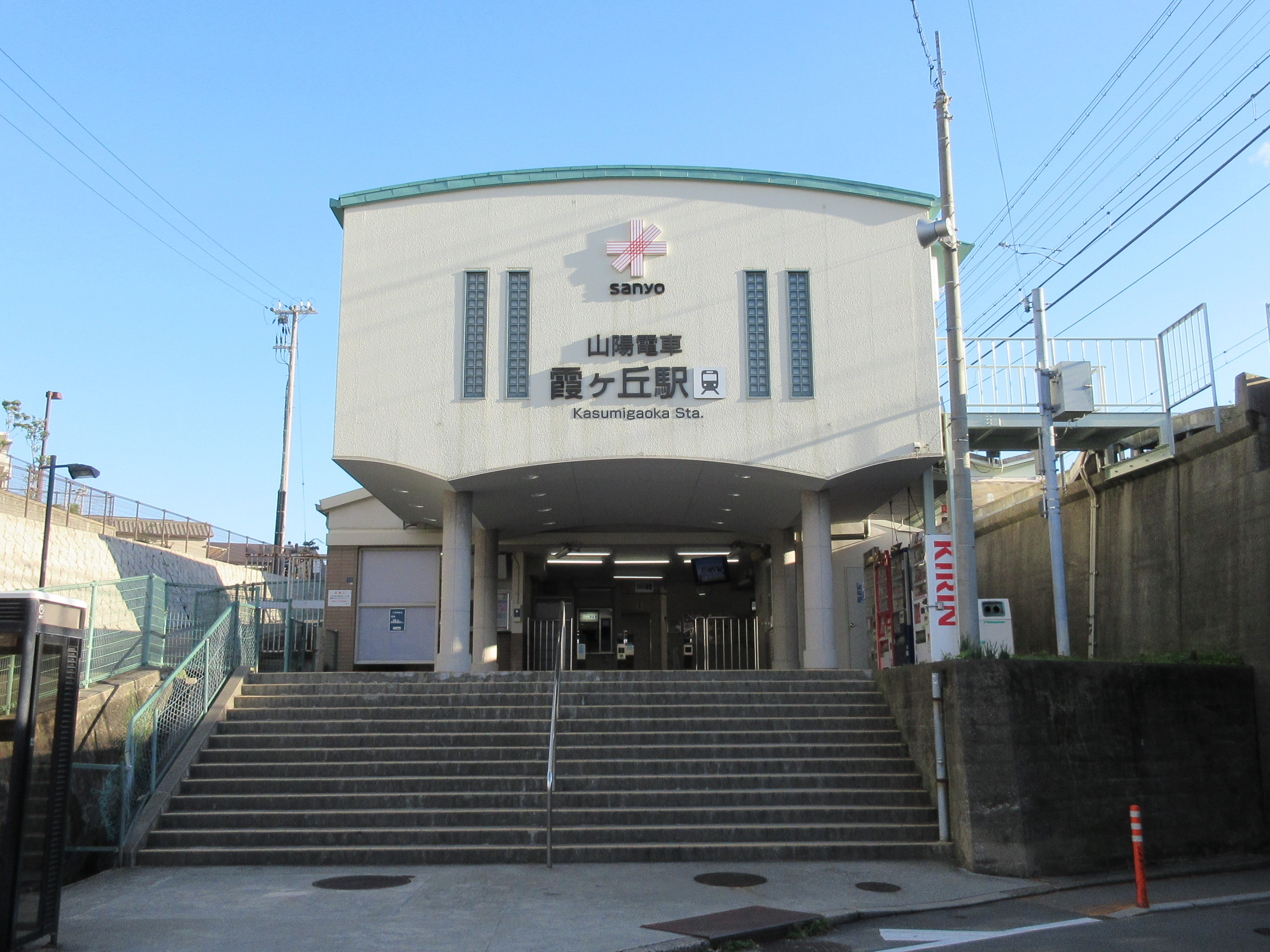
- Kasumigaoka Station, November 2017

General information
- Location: 5-chōme-4 Goshikiyama, Tarumi-ku, Kobe-shi, Hyōgo-ken 655-0035; Japan
- Coordinates: 34°37′51″N 135°02′32″E
- Operator: Sanyo Electric Railway
- Line: ■ Main Line
- Distance: 10.7 km from Nishidai
- Platforms: 2 island platforms
- Connections

Other information
- Station code: SY12
- Website: Official website

History
- Opened: 12 April 1917
- Former names: Utashikiyama (to 1964)

Passengers
- FY2019: 1041 (boarding only)
Location
- Location within Hyōgo Prefecture Location within Japan

Kasumigaoka Station (霞ヶ丘駅, Kasumigaoka-eki) is a passenger railway station located in Tarumi-ku, Kobe, Hyōgo Prefecture, Japan, operated by the private Sanyo Electric Railway.

== Lines ==
Kasumigaoka Station is served by the Sanyo Electric Railway Main Line and is 10.7 kilometers from the terminus of the line at Nishidai.

== Station layout ==
The station consists of two island platforms connected by an elevated station building. The station is unattended.

=== Platforms ===
1, 2	■ Main Line	for Sanyo Akashi, Sanyo Himeji and Sanyo-Aboshi
3, 4	■ Main Line	for Sannomiya and Osaka

== Adjacent stations ==
«	Service	»
Sanyo Electric Railway
Sanyo Electric Railway Main Line
Sanyo Tarumi	Local	Maiko-kōen
Sanyo Tarumi	S Limited Express	Sanyo Akashi
Through Limited Express: Does not stop at this station

== History ==
Kasumigaoka Station opened on April 12, 1917 as Utashikiyama Station (歌敷山駅). It was renamed to its present name on June 1, 1964

== Passenger statistics ==
In fiscal 2018, the station was used by an average of 1041 passengers daily (boarding passengers only).

== Surrounding area ==
- Goshikizuka (Sentsubo) Kofun
- Marinepia Kobe

== See also ==
- List of railway stations in Japan
