= Kiyohata Station =

Railway station in Hidaka, Hokkaido, Japan

Coordinates: 42.4556°N 142.1767°E

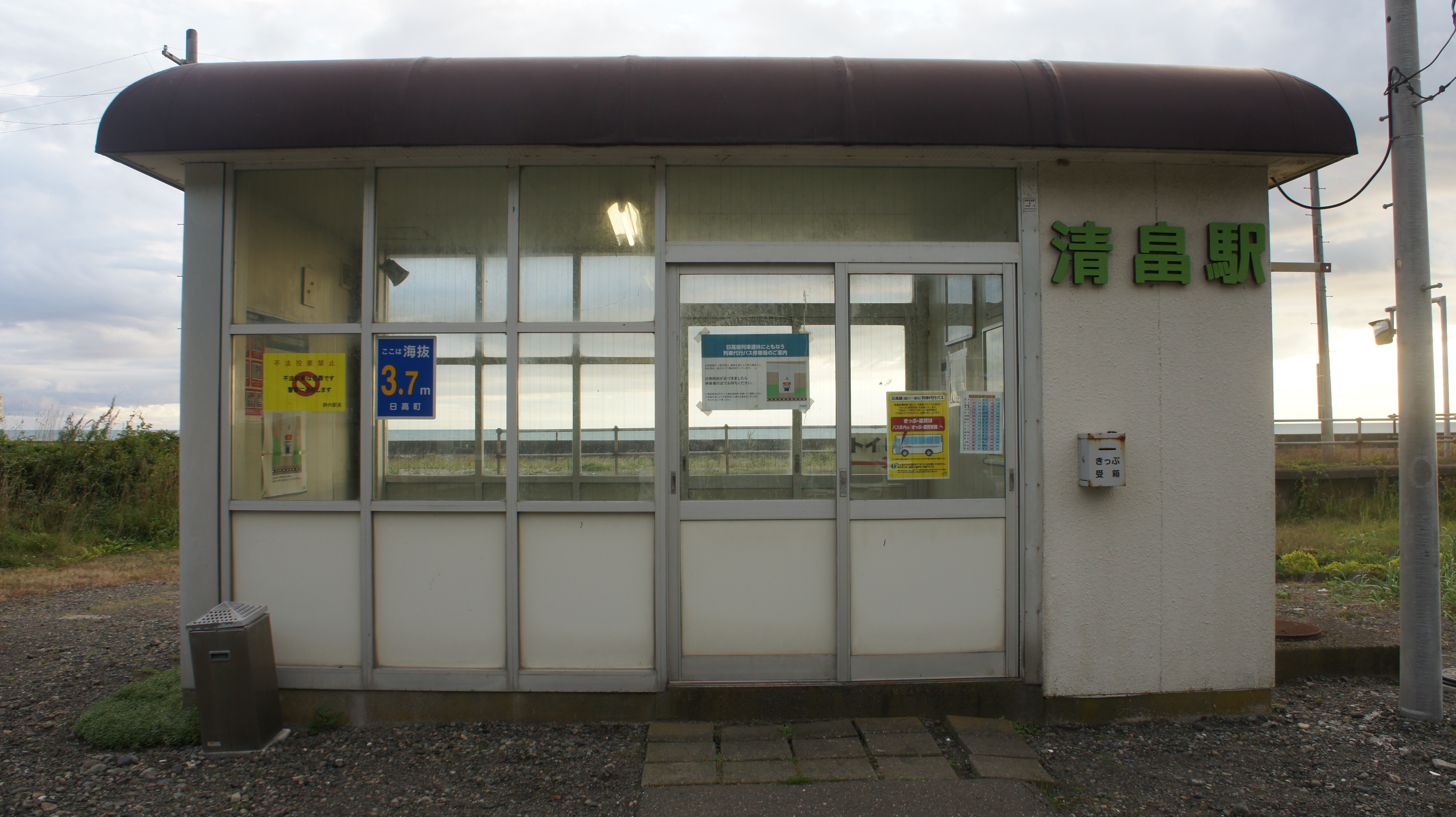
JR Hidaka-Main-Line Kiyohata Station building

Kiyohata Station (清畠駅, Kiyohata-eki) was a railway station on the Hidaka Main Line in Hidaka, Hokkaido, Japan, operated by the Hokkaido Railway Company (JR Hokkaido).

Services on the 116 km section of the line between Mukawa and Samani have been suspended indefinitely since January 2015 due to storm damage.

== Adjacent stations ==
| « | Service | » |
Hidaka Main Line
| Toyosato | Local | Atsuga |

== History ==
The station opened on 6 September 1924, named Kenomai Station (慶能舞駅). It was renamed Kiyohata on 1 April 1944. With the privatization of Japanese National Railways (JNR) on 1 April 1987, the station came under the control of JR Hokkaido.

== See also ==
- List of railway stations in Japan
