= Ōkaribe Station =

Railway station in Niikappu, Hokkaido, Japan

Coordinates: 42.3958°N 142.2591°E

Ōkaribe Station 大狩部駅

General information
- Location: Ōkaribe, Niikappu, Niikappu District, Hokkaido; Japan
- Operator: JR Hokkaido
- Line: Hidaka Main Line

History
- Opened: 15 July 1958
- Closed: 1 April 2021
Location
- Location within Japan

Ōkaribe Station (大狩部駅, Ōkaribe eki) was a railway station on the Hidaka Main Line in Niikappu, Hokkaido, Japan, operated by the Hokkaido Railway Company (JR Hokkaido).

Services on the 116 km (72 mi) section of the line between Mukawa and Samani have been suspended indefinitely since January 2015 due to storm damage.

== History ==
The station opened on 15 July 1958. With the privatization of Japanese National Railways (JNR) on 1 April 1987, the station came under the control of JR Hokkaido.

== See also ==
- List of railway stations in Japan
