= Shizunai Station =

Railway station in Shinhidaka, Hokkaido, Japan

Coordinates: 42.3367°N 142.3613°E

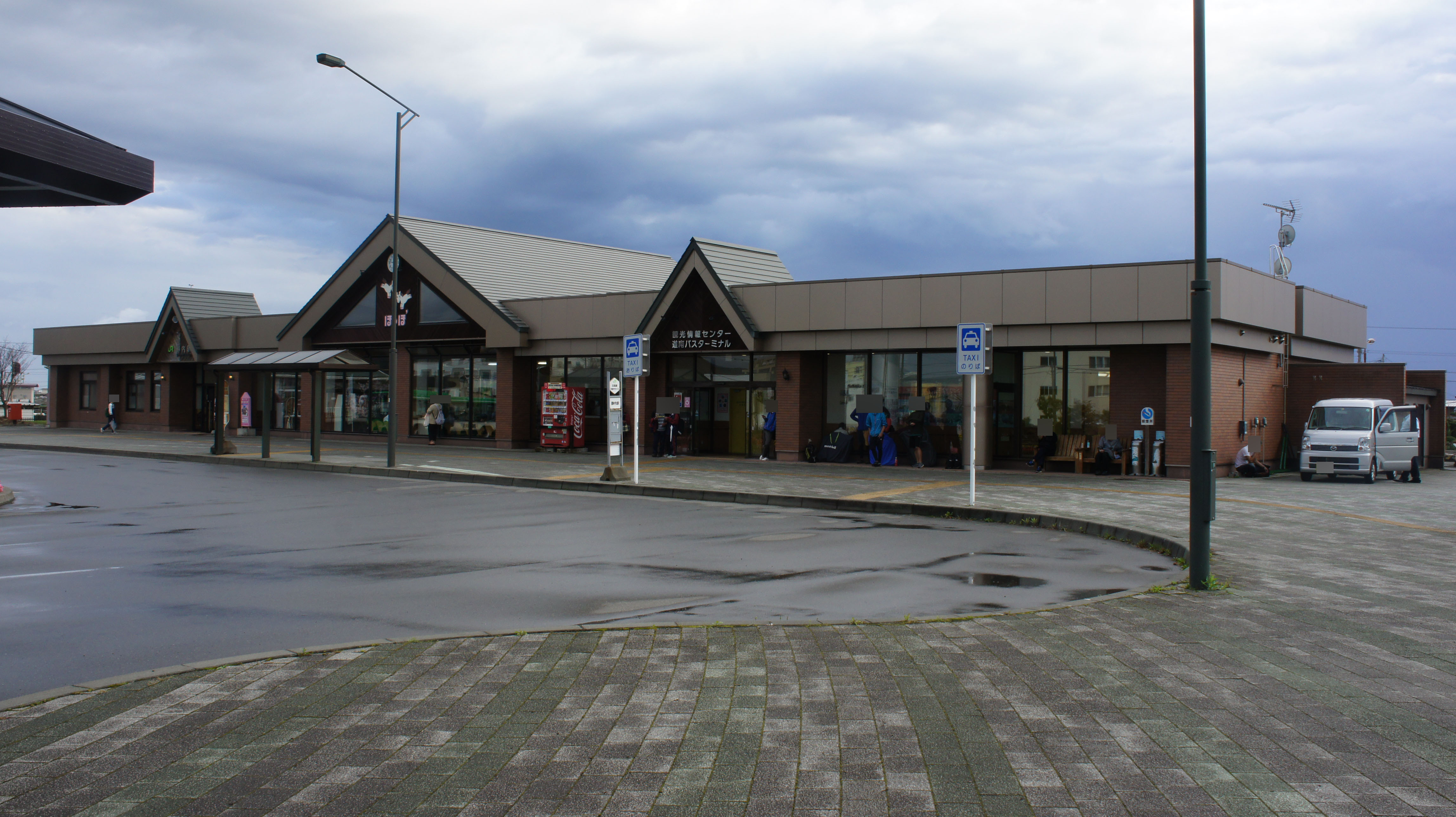
The station building

Shizunai Station (静内駅, Shizunai-eki) was a railway station on the Hidaka Main Line in Shinhidaka, Hokkaido, Japan, operated by the Hokkaido Railway Company (JR Hokkaido).

Services on the 116 km section of the line between Mukawa and Samani have been suspended indefinitely since January 2015 due to storm damage.

== History ==
The station opened on 7 December 1926. With the privatization of Japanese National Railways (JNR) on 1 April 1987, the station came under the control of JR Hokkaido.

== See also ==
- List of railway stations in Japan
