= Tomikawa Station =

Railway station in Hidaka, Hokkaido, Japan

Coordinates: 42.5167°N 142.0214°E

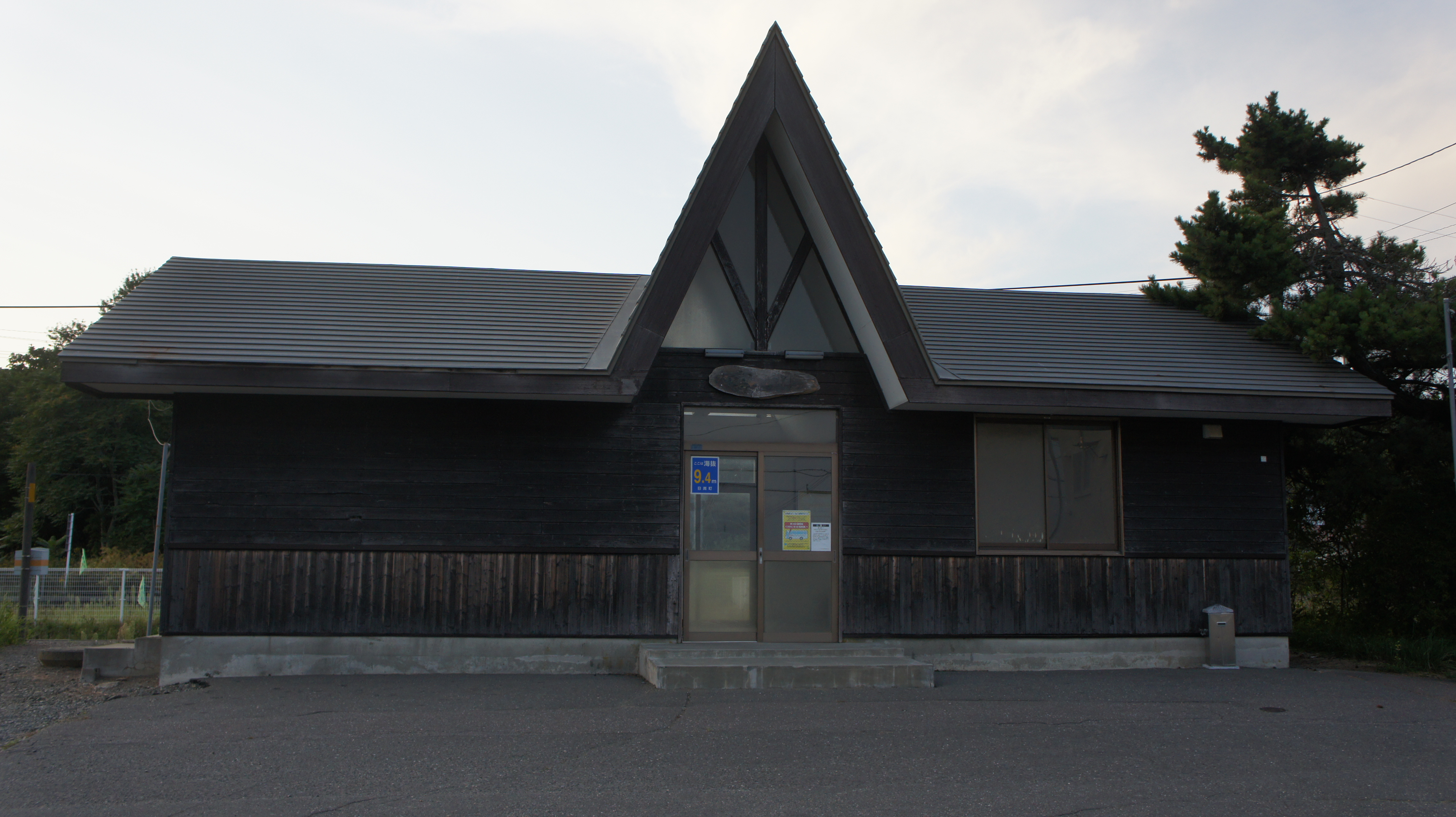
The station building

Tomikawa Station (富川駅, Tomikawa-eki) was a railway station on the Hidaka Main Line in Hidaka, Hokkaido, Japan, operated by the Hokkaido Railway Company (JR Hokkaido).

Services on the 116 km section of the line between Mukawa and Samani have been suspended indefinitely since January 2015 due to storm damage.

== Adjacent stations ==
«	Service	»
Hidaka Main Line
Shiomi	Local	Hidaka-Mombetsu

== History ==
The station opened on 1 October 1913, named Sarufuto Station (佐瑠太駅). It was renamed Tomikawa on 1 April 1944. With the privatization of Japanese National Railways (JNR) on 1 April 1987, the station came under the control of JR Hokkaido.

== See also ==
- List of railway stations in Japan
