= Niikappu, Hokkaido =

Niikappu 新冠町 Niikappu-chō
- Town
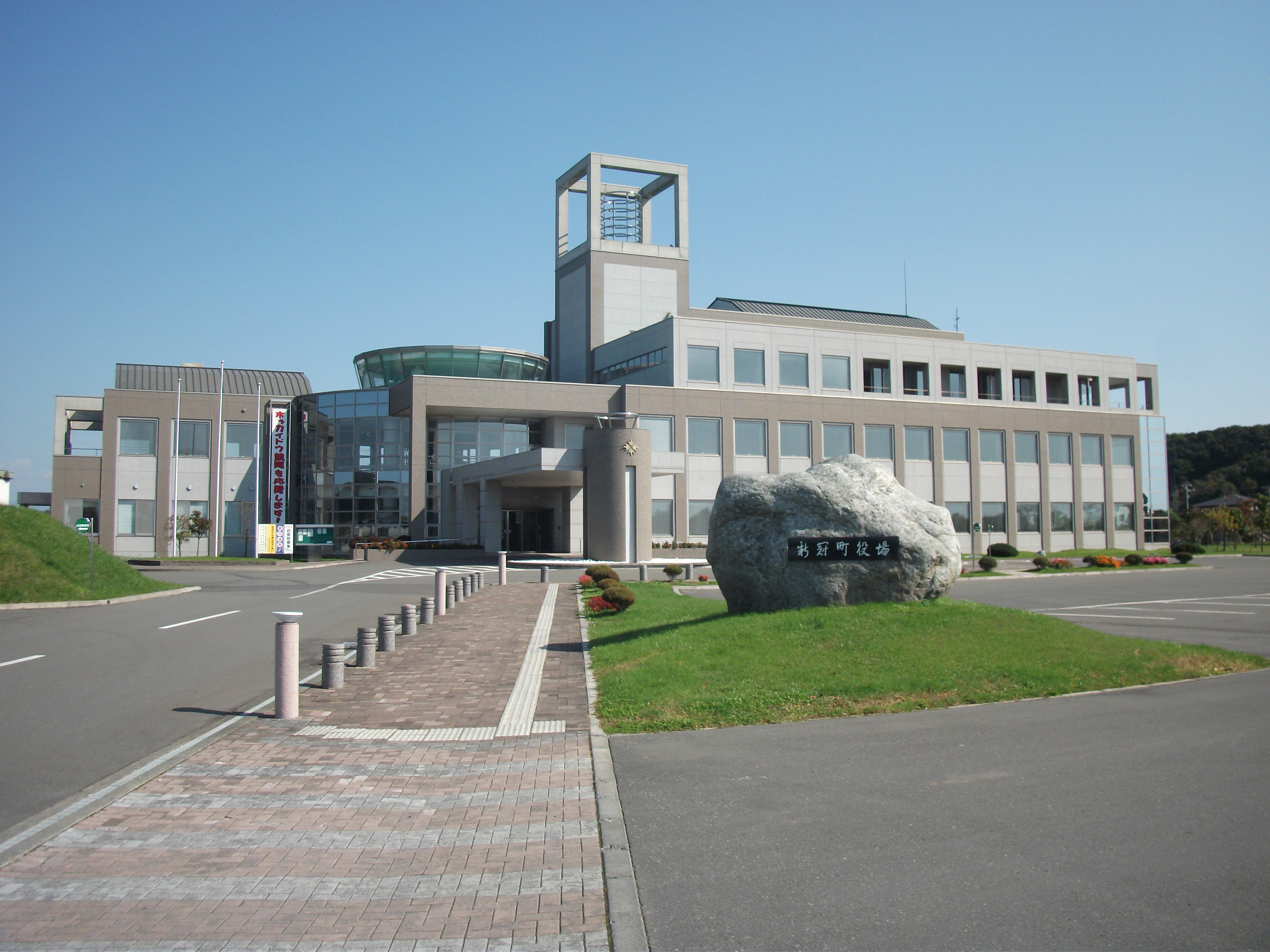
- Niikappu Town Hall

- Flag Coat of Arms

- Location of Niikappu in Hokkaido (Hidaka Subprefecture)
- Interactive map of Niikappu
- Coordinates: 42°21′45″N 142°19′06″E
- Country: Japan
- Region: Hokkaido
- Prefecture: Hokkaido (Hidaka Subprefecture)
- District: Niikappu

Government
  - Mayor: Kotake Kuniaki (小竹 國昭)

Area
  - Total: 585.71 km^{2} (226.14 sq mi)

Population (January 31, 2026)
  - Total: 4,942
  - Density: 8.438/km^{2} (21.85/sq mi)
- Time zone: UTC+09:00 (JST)
- City hall address: 3-2 Aza-Hokusei-chō, Niikappu-chō, Niikappu-gun, Hokkaidō 059-2492
- Website: www.niikappu.jp
- Symbols
- Flower: Azalea
- Mascot: Nikappun (にいかっぷん)
- Tree: Higatsura (ヒガツラ)

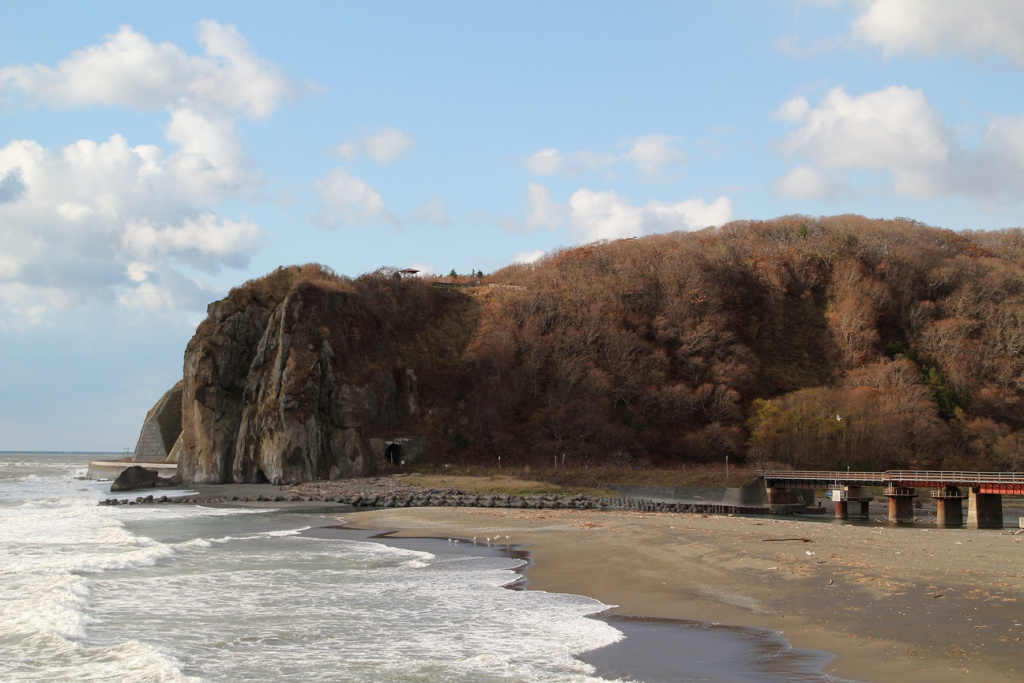
mount of Niikkapu River

Niikappu (新冠町, Niikappu-chō) is a town located in Hidaka Subprefecture, Hokkaidō, Japan. As of 31 January 2026, the town had an estimated population of 4,942 in 280 households, and a population density of 8.4 people per km^{2}. The total area of the town is 585.71 km^{2} (226.14 sq mi).

== Geography ==
Niikappu is located in southern Hokkaido, in the central coastal area of the Hidaka Subprefecture. The mountainous area originating from the Hidaka Mountains in the north is designated as the Hidakasanmyaku-Erimo-Tokachi National Park. The southern part faces the Pacific Ocean. Its highest point is Mount Poroshiri (2053 meters), and the lowest is at the coast. The town runs 45 kilometres (28 mi) east-west and 44 kilometres (27 mi) north-south along the Niikappu River.

=== Neighboring municipalities ===
- Obihiro
- Biratori
- Hisaka
- Shinhidaka
- Nakasatsunai

=== Climate ===
Niikappu has a humid continental climate (Köppen Dfb) with warm summers and cold winters. With an alternate definition, using the −3 °C (27 °F) isotherm, Niikappu falls in the rare oceanic climate (Cfb) of the east coast of the continents due to the warm current of Tsugaru. Owing to its slightly more southerly latitude, easterly aspect and location on the sea, snowfall is much lighter than in the major cities of western Hokkaido like Sapporo, Hakodate, Asahikawa and Wakkanai. Precipitation in heaviest in the summer months when remnant typhoons may approach. Year-round sunshine, although less than in the Tokachi Plain, is also higher than western Hokkaido.

Climate data for Shinwa, Niikappu (新和; 1991–2020)
Month	Jan	Feb	Mar	Apr	May	Jun	Jul	Aug	Sep	Oct	Nov	Dec	Year
Record high °C (°F)	9.4 (48.9)	13.2 (55.8)	17.9 (64.2)	25.4 (77.7)	31.3 (88.3)	33.2 (91.8)	35.0 (95.0)	36.0 (96.8)	33.0 (91.4)	25.9 (78.6)	20.9 (69.6)	15.5 (59.9)	36.0 (96.8)
Mean daily maximum °C (°F)	−0.1 (31.8)	0.7 (33.3)	4.8 (40.6)	11.7 (53.1)	17.9 (64.2)	21.4 (70.5)	24.8 (76.6)	26.0 (78.8)	22.8 (73.0)	16.4 (61.5)	8.9 (48.0)	1.9 (35.4)	13.1 (55.6)
Daily mean °C (°F)	−7.1 (19.2)	−6.1 (21.0)	−0.9 (30.4)	5.1 (41.2)	11.3 (52.3)	15.6 (60.1)	19.7 (67.5)	20.7 (69.3)	16.5 (61.7)	9.3 (48.7)	2.6 (36.7)	−4.2 (24.4)	6.9 (44.4)
Mean daily minimum °C (°F)	−14.5 (5.9)	−14.0 (6.8)	−7.3 (18.9)	−1.7 (28.9)	4.5 (40.1)	10.3 (50.5)	15.7 (60.3)	16.4 (61.5)	11.0 (51.8)	2.9 (37.2)	−3.2 (26.2)	−10.3 (13.5)	0.8 (33.4)
Record low °C (°F)	−28.6 (−19.5)	−29.2 (−20.6)	−23.3 (−9.9)	−13.3 (8.1)	−4.8 (23.4)	−0.5 (31.1)	4.9 (40.8)	6.1 (43.0)	−0.7 (30.7)	−6.8 (19.8)	−15.7 (3.7)	−26.7 (−16.1)	−29.2 (−20.6)
Average precipitation mm (inches)	42.2 (1.66)	40.0 (1.57)	69.3 (2.73)	98.5 (3.88)	127.7 (5.03)	99.4 (3.91)	150.6 (5.93)	206.3 (8.12)	161.2 (6.35)	125.0 (4.92)	106.6 (4.20)	74.0 (2.91)	1,300.6 (51.20)
Average precipitation days (≥ 1.0 mm)	9.0	9.1	11.1	12.3	11.8	9.9	11.4	12.0	11.5	13.0	13.5	11.5	136.2
Mean monthly sunshine hours	118.2	116.4	140.7	162.3	182.8	150.5	117.2	133.3	152.9	144.0	106.6	107.1	1,631.8
Source: Japan Meteorological Agency

=== Demographics ===
Per Japanese census data, the population of Niikappu has declined in recent decades.

Historical population
Year	Pop.	±%
1970	9,455	—
1980	7,634	−19.3%
1990	6,947	−9.0%
2000	6,204	−10.7%
2010	5,777	−6.9%
2020	5,309	−8.1%

== History ==
The area of Niikappu was settled by Japanese colonists in September 1881. It was established as a village in 1923 under the second-class town and village system and raised to town status in 1961.

== Government ==
Niikappu has a mayor-council form of government with a directly elected mayor and a unicameral town council of 11 members. Niikappu, as part of Hidaka Subprefecture, contributes two members to the Hokkaidō Prefectural Assembly. In terms of national politics, the town is part of the Hokkaidō 9th district of the lower house of the Diet of Japan.

== Economy ==
Cliff art outside Niikappu (1992)

The town is mainly known for production of racehorses, including Haiseiko, Narita Brian, and Oguri Cap. Other popular exports include kelp, green capsicum, and milk.

== Education ==
Niikappu has two public elementary schools and one public middle school operated by the town. The town does not have a high school.

== Transportation ==
=== Railways ===
Niikappu was served by the JR Hokkaido Hidaka Main Line. However, no trains have operated between Mukawa and Samani since January 2015, due to storm damage. Plans to restore this section of the line have been abandoned, due to declining passenger numbers and very high maintenance costs, and the section was officially closed on 1 April 2021, and replaced by a bus service.

Defunct railway stations in Niikappu: Ōkaribe - Seppu - Niikappu

=== Highways ===
- Hidaka Expressway
- National Route 235

== Local attractions ==
- Niikappu Mud Volcano - Hokkaido Designated Natural Monument
- Niikappu Local History Museum
- Niikappu Onsen
- Niikappu Record Hall, Japan's largest vinyl gramophone records museum.
- Hangandate Forest Park, a seaside park with a playground and an ocean view
- Yushun Memorial Hall
- Taiyo no Mori DiMasio Museum, a converted elementary school dedicated to housing the works of French artist Gerard Dimaccio.
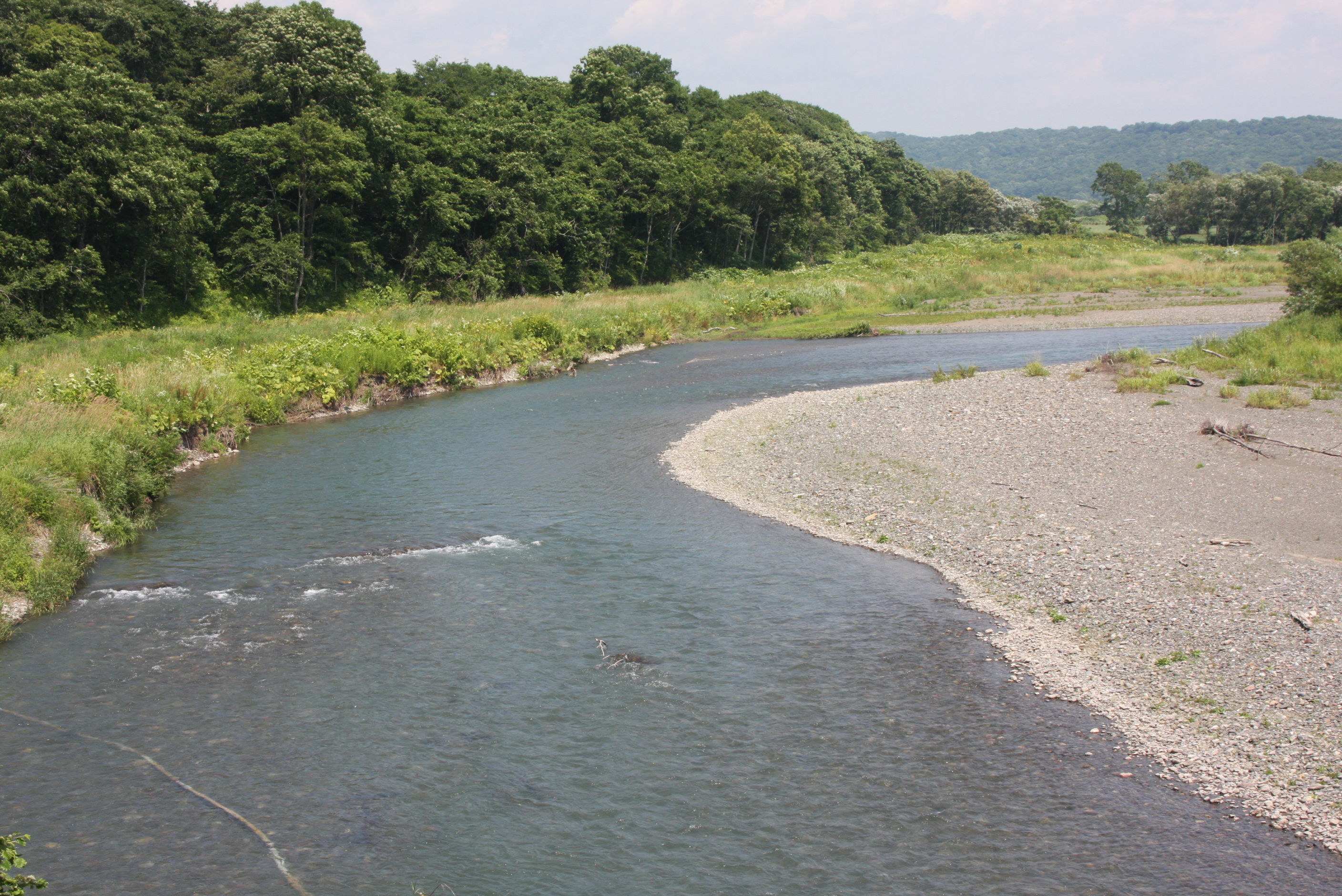
Niikappu River

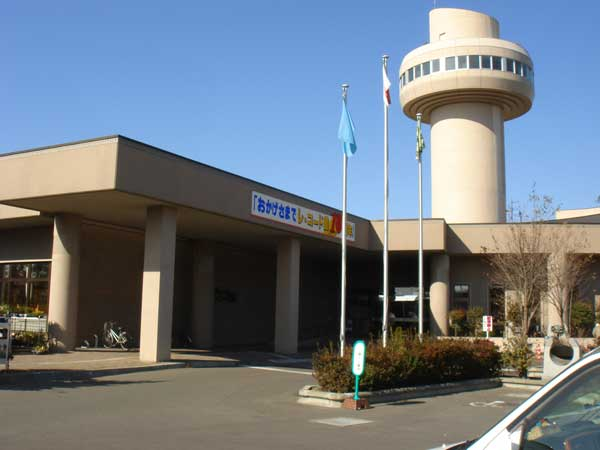
Niikappu Record Museum

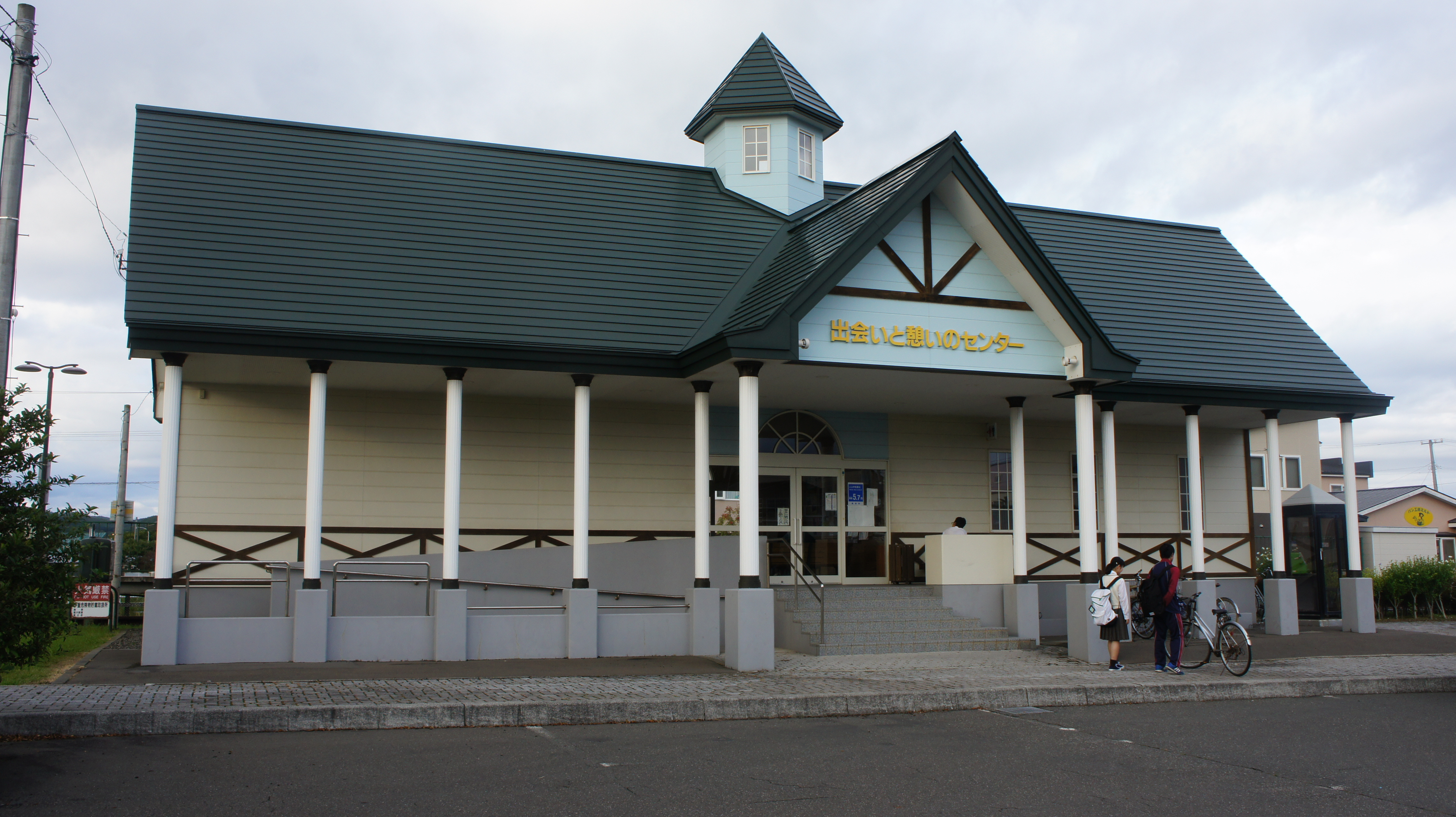
former Niikappu Station

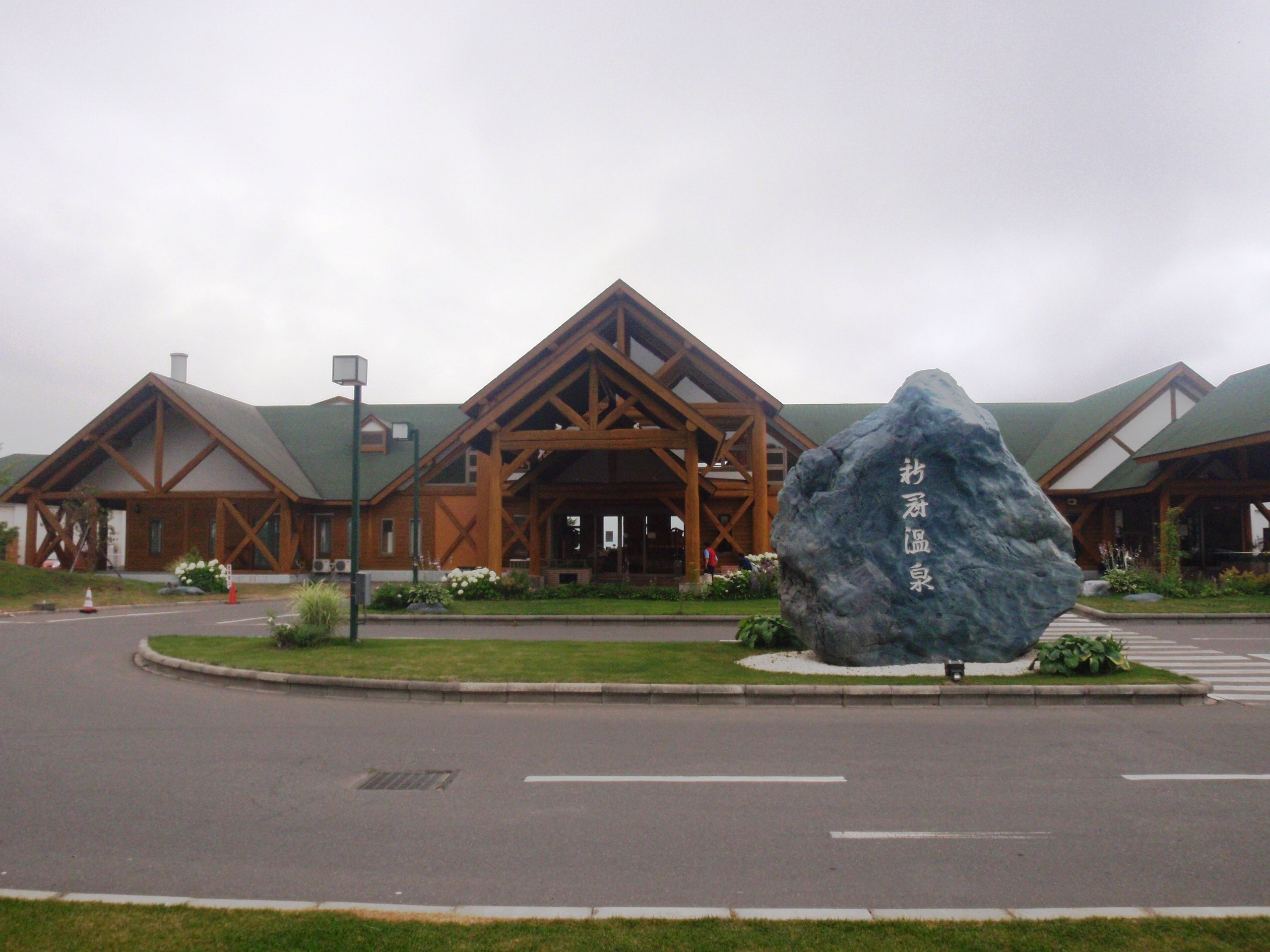
Niikappu Onsen

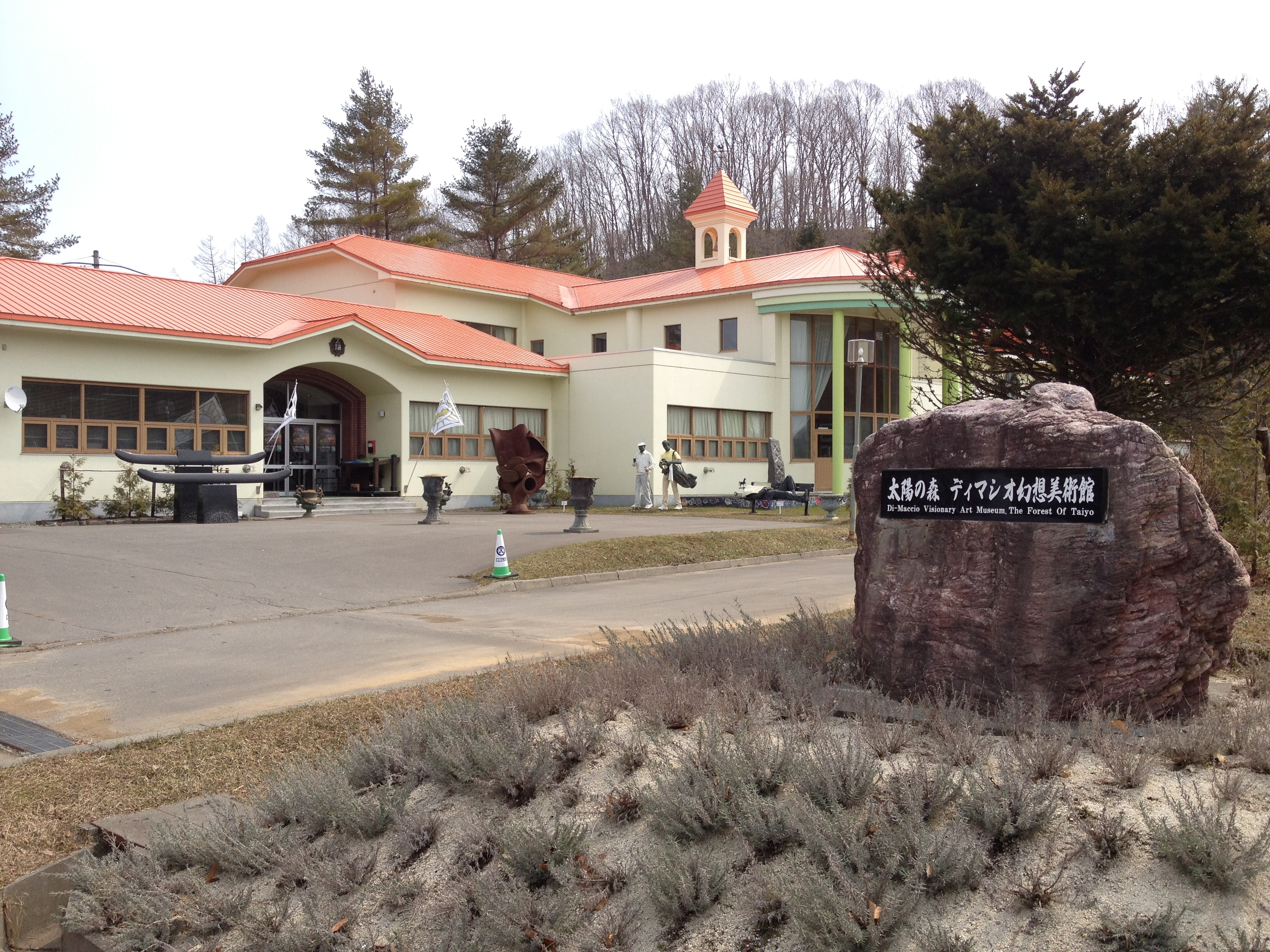
Dimaccio. Art Museum

=== Mascot ===
Nikappun, the town's mascot

Niikappu's mascot is Nikappun (にいかっぷん). She is a superhero horse who wears earrings made of azalea and green bell peppers and a cape. Her weapon is an asparagus. Her heart-shape nose is a sign of peace. She watches over Niikappu everyday.
