= Higashichō Station =

Railway station in Urakawa, Hokkaido, Japan

Coordinates: 42.1562°N 142.7886°E

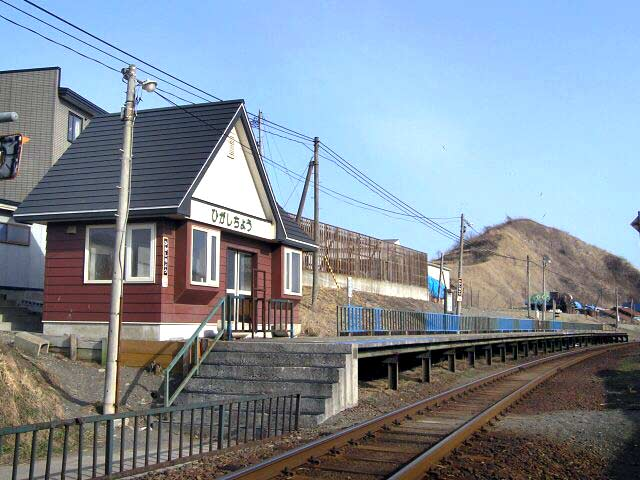
The station building and platform

Higashichō Station (東町駅, Higashichō-eki) was a railway station on the Hidaka Main Line in Urakawa, Hokkaido, Japan, operated by the Hokkaido Railway Company (JR Hokkaido).

== Lines ==
Higashichō Station is served by the Hidaka Main Line. However, services on the 116 km section of the line between Mukawa and Samani have been suspended indefinitely since January 2015 due to storm damage.

== Adjacent stations ==
«	Service	»
Hidaka Main Line
Urakawa	Local	Hidaka-Horobetsu

== History ==
The station opened on 1 September 1977. With the privatization of Japanese National Railways (JNR) on 1 April 1987, the station came under the control of JR Hokkaido.

== See also ==
- List of railway stations in Japan
