= 富川駅 =

富川駅 or 富川驛 may refer to:

- Bucheon Station
- Tomikawa Station
