= Hidaka Main Line =

Railway line in Hokkaido, Japan

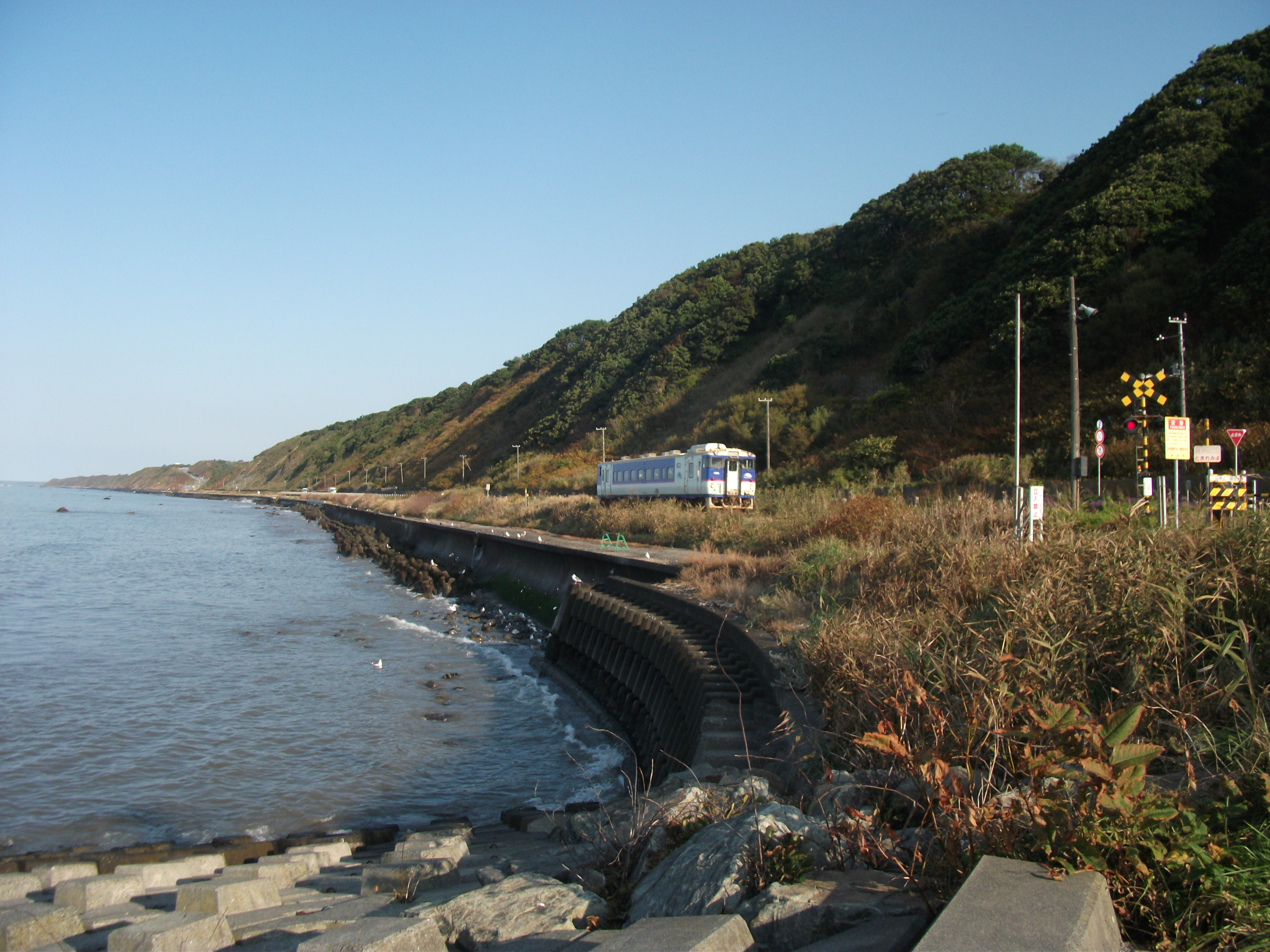
- A KiHa 40 series local train on the Hidaka Main Line between Okaribe and Seppu in October 2011

Overview
- Native name: 日高本線
- Status: Operational
- Owner: JR Hokkaido
- Locale: Hokkaido
- Termini: Tomakomai; Samani
- Stations: 4 (since March 2023); 5 (January 2015–March 2023); 29 (before January 2015)

Service
- Type: Heavy rail
- Operator: JR Hokkaido
- Rolling stock: KiHa 40 series DMU, Bus

History
- Opened: October 1913; 112 years ago
- Closed: 1 April 2021 (Mukawa–Samani section replaced by bus service in January 2015, formally closed on 1 April 2021)

Technical
- Line length: 30.5 km (19.0 mi)
- Number of tracks: Entire line single tracked
- Character: Rural
- Track gauge: 1,067 mm (3 ft 6 in)
- Old gauge: 762 mm (2 ft 6 in)
- Electrification: None
- Operating speed: 95 km/h (59 mph)
Route map

The Hidaka Main Line (日高本線, Hidaka-honsen) is a railway line in Hokkaido, Japan operated by Hokkaido Railway Company (JR Hokkaido). It runs between Tomakomai Station in Tomakomai and Mukawa Station in Mukawa, along the coast of Hidaka Subprefecture.

Prior to storm damage in January 2015, which resulted in an indefinite suspension of services on most of the line, the line was 146.5 km (91.0 mi) in length, and trains ran a further 116.0 km (72.1 mi) to terminate at Samani Station in Samani. This section was formally closed on 1 April 2021 and permanently replaced by bus service. The closure of this section made the line the second shortest in Japan to be classified as a "main line", at just 30.5 km (19.0 mi), after the Rumoi Main Line's length of 14.4 km (8.9 mi). After the Rumoi Main Line's closure on 1 April 2026, the Hidaka Main Line became the shortest main line in Japan.

== Services ==
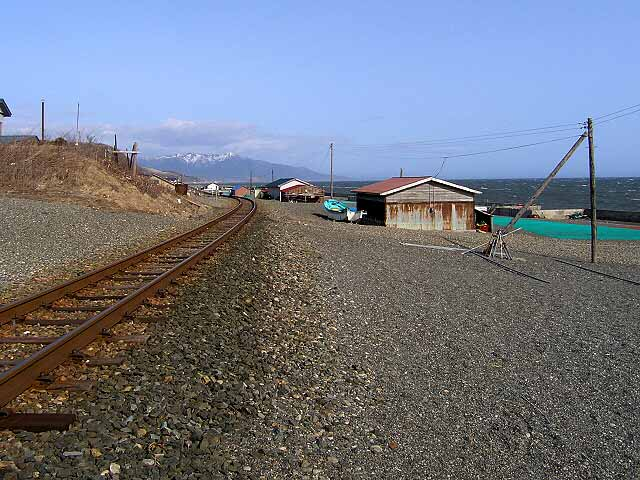
The coastline near Hidaka-Mombetsu

All regular trains are local trains, which stop at all stations.

== Stations ==
Station			Distance (km)	Transfers	Location
H18	Tomakomai	苫小牧	0.0	■ Muroran Main Line ■ Chitose Line	Tomakomai
	Yūfutsu	勇払	13.1		Tomakomai
	Hama-Atsuma	浜厚真	22.7		Atsuma, Yūfutsu District
	~~Hama-Taura~~	浜田浦	27.0		Mukawa, Yūfutsu District
	Mukawa	鵡川	30.5		Mukawa, Yūfutsu District
↓ Closed 1 April 2021 ↓
	Shiomi	汐見	34.5		Mukawa, Yūfutsu District
	Tomikawa	富川	43.6		Hidaka, Saru District
	Hidaka-Mombetsu	日高門別	51.3		Hidaka, Saru District
	Toyosato	豊郷	56.3		Hidaka, Saru District
	Kiyohata	清畠	61.1		Hidaka, Saru District
	Atsuga	厚賀	65.6		Hidaka, Saru District
	Ōkaribe	大狩部	71.1		Niikappu, Niikappu District
	Seppu	節婦	73.1		Niikappu, Niikappu District
	Niikappu	新冠	77.2		Niikappu, Niikappu District
	Shizunai	静内	82.1		Shinhidaka, Hidaka District
	Higashi-Shizunai	東静内	90.9		Shinhidaka, Hidaka District
	Harutachi	春立	97.0		Shinhidaka, Hidaka District
	Hidaka-Tōbetsu	日高東別	99.4		Shinhidaka, Hidaka District
	Hidaka-Mitsuishi	日高三石	105.8		Shinhidaka, Hidaka District
	Hōei	蓬栄	109.8		Shinhidaka, Hidaka District
	Honkiri	本桐	113.0		Shinhidaka, Hidaka District
	Ogifushi	荻伏	120.2		Urakawa, Urakawa District
	Efue	絵笛	125.1		Urakawa, Urakawa District
	Urakawa	浦河	130.3		Urakawa, Urakawa District
	Higashichō	東町	132.4		Urakawa, Urakawa District
	Hidaka-Horobetsu	日高幌別	136.9		Urakawa, Urakawa District
	Utoma	鵜苫	141.1		Samani, Samani District
	Nishi-Samani	西様似	143.6		Samani, Samani District
	Samani	様似	146.5		Samani, Samani District

== History ==
The first section was opened in October 1913 by the Tomakomai Light Railway (苫小牧軽便鉄道, Tomakomai Keiben Tetsudō), operating between Tomakomai and Sarufuto (佐瑠太) (present-day Tomikawa). The section between Sarufuto and Shizunai was operated by the Hidaka Takushoku Railway (日高拓殖鉄道, Hidaka Takushoku Tetsudō). Both lines were light railways with a track gauge of 762 mm (2 ft 6 in).

The lines were nationalized on 1 August 1927, and merged into one, becoming the Hidaka Line. The track gauge was widened to 1,067 mm (3 ft 6 in) between Tomakomai and Sarufuto on 26 November 1929, and between Sarafuto and Shizunai on 10 November 1931. The line was extended from Shizunai to Hidaka-Mitsuishi on 15 December 1933, to Urakawa on 24 October 1935, and to Samani on 10 August 1937.

With the privatization of JNR on 1 April 1987, the line came under the control of JR Hokkaido.

=== Service suspension ===
Following storm damage between Atsuga and Ōkaribe stations on 8 January 2015, rail services had been suspended on the 116.0 km (72.1 mi) section beyond Mukawa station, with buses providing a substitute service. Further damage was caused to the line by Typhoon 17 or Typhoon Kilo on 12 September 2015, and no date had been set for the resumption of rail services beyond Mukawa. In December 2016, JR Hokkaido announced that it had abandoned plans to reopen the suspended section of the line, and was in discussion with the local governments involved.

Due to low ridership and very high repair costs, including coastal defences between Atsuga and Ōkaribe, JR Hokkaido held several meetings with the seven towns along the suspended segment of the line, suggesting to abandon plans to restore the line and replace it with a bus service. In November 2019, six out of the seven towns agreed to replace the damaged section with a bus service. However, the town of Urakawa still strongly requested for the whole line to be restored; Urakawa's mayor reasoned that it would still take a while for the 'developing' Hidaka Expressway to reach the town, therefore it being necessary to retain the rail service.

In September 2020, after five years of meetings and discussions, many of which involved extensive arguments and disagreements, all seven towns eventually agreed with JR Hokkaido to abandon the line's damaged section and replace it with a bus service. The 116.0 km (72.1 mi) section was formally closed on 1 April 2021.

== See also ==
- List of railway lines in Japan
