= Toyosato Station =

Toyosato Station (豊郷駅) is the name of two train stations in Japan:

- Toyosato Station (Hokkaidō)
- Toyosato Station (Shiga)
