= Hama-Taura Station =

Railway station in Mukawa, Hokkaido, Japan

Coordinates: 42.5906°N 141.8836°E

Hama-Taura Station 浜田浦駅
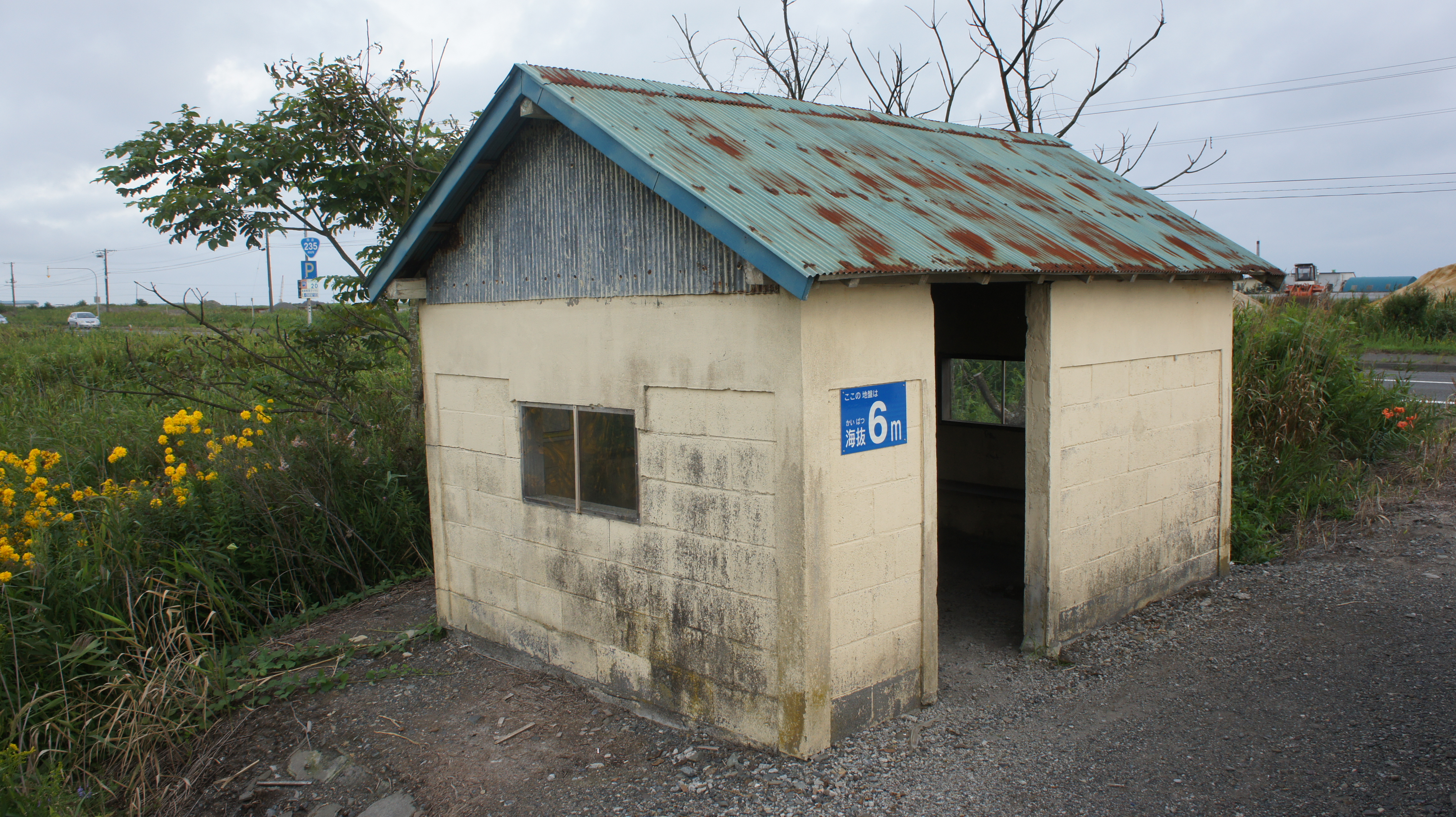
- Hama-Taura Station Waiting room

General information
- Location: Mukawa; Hokkaido Prefecture; Japan
- Operator: JR Hokkaido
- Line: Hidaka Main Line
- Platforms: 1 side platform
- Tracks: 1

Construction
- Structure type: At grade

History
- Opened: 18 December 1959; 66 years ago
- Closed: 18 March 2023

Services
Preceding station	JR Hokkaido	Following station
Hama-Atsuma towards Tomakomai	Hidaka Main Line	Mukawa Terminus
Location
- Location within Hokkaido Location within Japan

Hama-Taura Station (浜田浦駅, Hama-Taura eki) was a railway station on the Hidaka Main Line in Mukawa, Hokkaidō, Japan, operated by the Hokkaido Railway Company (JR Hokkaido).

Some trains pass through this station, but a total of 12 trains stop here each day.

2021 In July, JR Hokkaido notified Mukawa Town of its intention to abolish this station in agreement with the residents. According to a JR survey, the average number of passengers per day at the station was 2 from 2016 to 2020, and 1 in 2021. According to Mukawa Mayor Yoshiyuki Takenaka, he revealed at the regular town assembly that JR Hokkaido told him that the station was scheduled to be abolished on April 1, 2023.
