= Hidaka, Hokkaido =

Hidaka 日高町
- Town
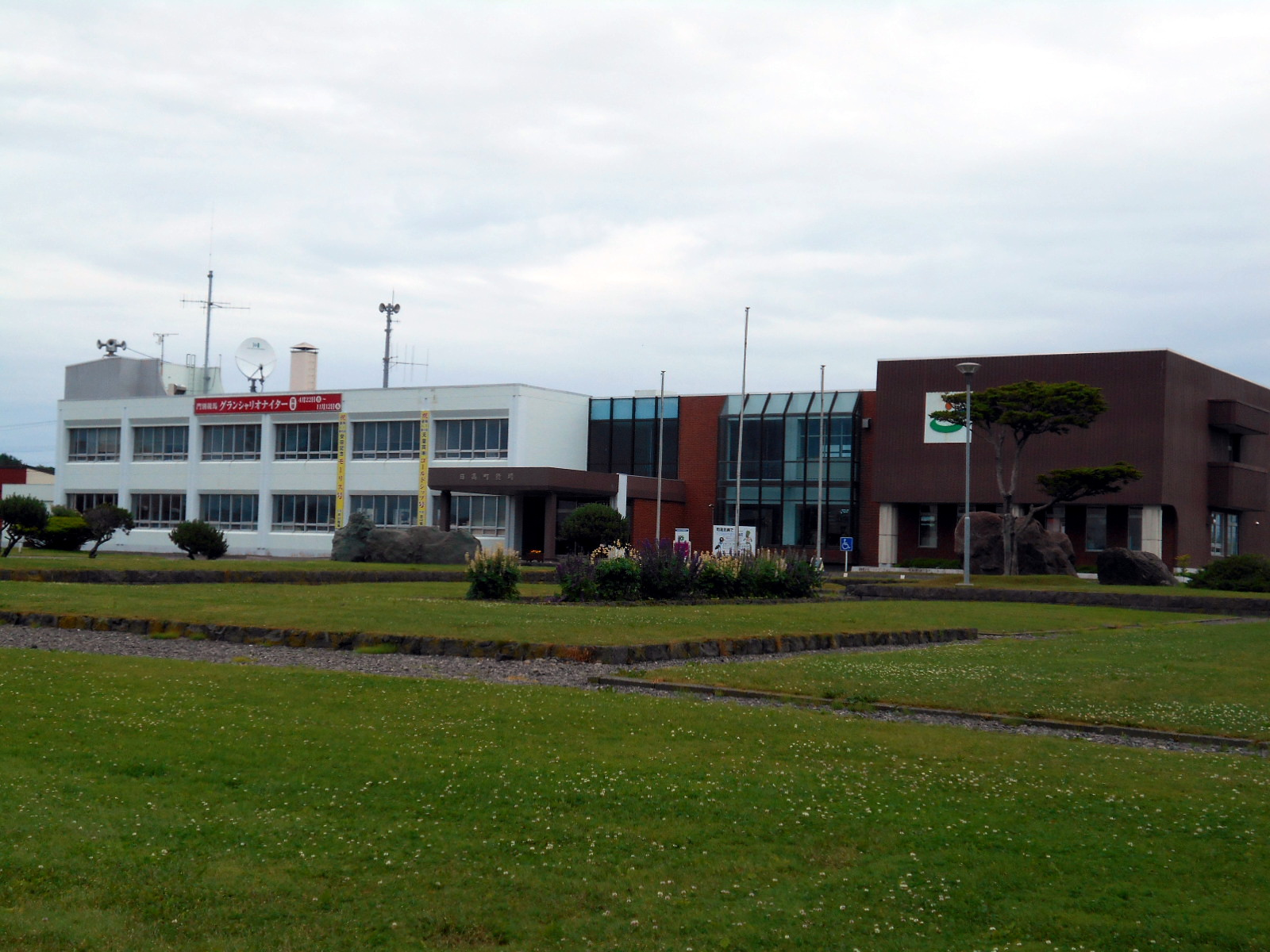
- Hidaka Town hall

- Flag Emblem

- Location of Hidaka in Hokkaido (Tokachi Subprefecture)
- Interactive map of Hidaka
- Coordinates: 42°28′49″N 142°04′27″E
- Country: Japan
- Region: Hokkaido
- Prefecture: Hokkaido (Hidaka Subprefecture)
- District: Saru

Government
  - Mayor: Shigeru Miwa (三輪 茂)

Area
  - Total: 992.67 km^{2} (383.27 sq mi)

Population (December 31, 2025)
  - Total: 10,767
  - Density: 10.847/km^{2} (28.092/sq mi)
- Time zone: UTC+09:00 (JST)
- City hall address: 210-1 Monbetsu Honchō, Hidaka-chō, Saru-gun, Hokkaidō 059-2192
- Climate: Dfb
- Website: Official website
- Symbols
- Flower: Siebold's primrose
- Mascot: Kurumi-chan
- Tree: Daimyo oak

Hidaka (日高町, Hidaka-chō) is a town located in Hidaka Subprefecture, Hokkaidō, Japan. As of 31 December 2025, the town had an estimated population of 10,767 in 6224 households, and a population density of 11 people per km^{2}. The total area of the town is 992.07 km^{2} (383.04 sq mi).

== Geography ==
Hidaka Town is divided into two exclaves, which coincide with the former towns of Hidaka and Monbetsu, separated from each other by the town of Biratori. The town is located in the northern part of Hidaka Subprefecture, on the upper and lower reaches of the Saru River. Hidaka Ward (Hidaka-ku) lies in the Hidaka Mountains at a cross road leading to Sapporo, Furano, Obihiro, and Biratori. These crossroads lead to Hidaka and Nisshō passes. Monbetsu Ward (Monbetsu-ku) lies on the coast of the Pacific Ocean at the outlet of the Saru River. The eastern part is mostly forested, and the mountainous region originating from the Hidaka Mountains and the upper reaches of the Saru River are within the borders of the Hidakasanmyaku-Erimo-Tokachi National Park.

Hidaka ward has an area of 563.94 square kilometres (217.74 sq mi) and Monbetsu ward has an area of 428.73 square kilometres (165.53 sq mi).

=== Neighboring municipalities ===
- Obihiro
- Memuro
- Shimizu
- Biratori
- Niikappu
- Mukawa
- Shimukappu
- Minamifurano

=== Climate ===
According to the Köppen climate classification, Hidaka has a humid continental climate. It has large temperature differences, including large annual and daily temperature ranges. It receives a lot of snow, and is designated as a heavy snow area. In winter, temperatures below -20 °C are not uncommon, making it extremely cold.

Climate data for Mobetsu（1991 - 2020）
| Month | Jan | Feb | Mar | Apr | May | Jun | Jul | Aug | Sep | Oct | Nov | Dec | Year |
|---|---|---|---|---|---|---|---|---|---|---|---|---|---|
| Record high °C (°F) | 9.5 (49.1) | 10.4 (50.7) | 14.3 (57.7) | 20.4 (68.7) | 25.7 (78.3) | 31.3 (88.3) | 32.2 (90.0) | 32.1 (89.8) | 29.8 (85.6) | 23.4 (74.1) | 19.1 (66.4) | 15.6 (60.1) | 32.2 (90.0) |
| Mean daily maximum °C (°F) | 0.0 (32.0) | 0.6 (33.1) | 4.3 (39.7) | 9.9 (49.8) | 15.0 (59.0) | 18.4 (65.1) | 22.1 (71.8) | 24.1 (75.4) | 21.8 (71.2) | 16.0 (60.8) | 9.1 (48.4) | 2.5 (36.5) | 12.0 (53.6) |
| Daily mean °C (°F) | −4.9 (23.2) | −4.3 (24.3) | 0.1 (32.2) | 5.3 (41.5) | 10.5 (50.9) | 14.5 (58.1) | 18.6 (65.5) | 20.5 (68.9) | 17.3 (63.1) | 10.9 (51.6) | 4.4 (39.9) | −2.1 (28.2) | 7.6 (45.7) |
| Mean daily minimum °C (°F) | −10.3 (13.5) | −10.0 (14.0) | −4.6 (23.7) | 0.6 (33.1) | 6.1 (43.0) | 11.1 (52.0) | 15.8 (60.4) | 17.4 (63.3) | 12.8 (55.0) | 5.6 (42.1) | −0.5 (31.1) | −6.9 (19.6) | 3.1 (37.6) |
| Record low °C (°F) | −22.7 (−8.9) | −23.4 (−10.1) | −20.7 (−5.3) | −11.5 (11.3) | −2.6 (27.3) | 2.8 (37.0) | 6.8 (44.2) | 8.7 (47.7) | 1.7 (35.1) | −3.9 (25.0) | −11.9 (10.6) | −20.1 (−4.2) | −23.4 (−10.1) |
| Average precipitation mm (inches) | 25.2 (0.99) | 24.0 (0.94) | 38.3 (1.51) | 65.7 (2.59) | 97.1 (3.82) | 87.0 (3.43) | 130.7 (5.15) | 178.5 (7.03) | 127.3 (5.01) | 93.8 (3.69) | 73.0 (2.87) | 43.3 (1.70) | 983.7 (38.73) |
| Average precipitation days (≥ 1.0 mm) | 6.5 | 6.1 | 7.1 | 9.4 | 9.9 | 8.8 | 10.2 | 10.6 | 10.5 | 10.2 | 10.1 | 8.2 | 107.6 |
| Mean monthly sunshine hours | 142.0 | 152.0 | 186.8 | 179.3 | 185.4 | 154.6 | 122.3 | 140.3 | 166.9 | 164.6 | 126.5 | 118.7 | 1,839.3 |
Source 1: Japan Meteorological Agency
Source 2: Japan Meteorological Agency

Climate data for Hidaka（1991 - 2020）
| Month | Jan | Feb | Mar | Apr | May | Jun | Jul | Aug | Sep | Oct | Nov | Dec | Year |
|---|---|---|---|---|---|---|---|---|---|---|---|---|---|
| Record high °C (°F) | 7.7 (45.9) | 13.6 (56.5) | 17.7 (63.9) | 26.4 (79.5) | 32.0 (89.6) | 34.4 (93.9) | 35.8 (96.4) | 35.5 (95.9) | 32.0 (89.6) | 25.6 (78.1) | 19.3 (66.7) | 13.4 (56.1) | 35.8 (96.4) |
| Mean daily maximum °C (°F) | −2.5 (27.5) | −1.4 (29.5) | 3.0 (37.4) | 10.3 (50.5) | 17.5 (63.5) | 21.6 (70.9) | 24.8 (76.6) | 25.5 (77.9) | 21.5 (70.7) | 14.6 (58.3) | 6.6 (43.9) | −0.3 (31.5) | 11.7 (53.1) |
| Daily mean °C (°F) | −7.6 (18.3) | −6.8 (19.8) | −2.1 (28.2) | 4.3 (39.7) | 11.0 (51.8) | 15.6 (60.1) | 19.5 (67.1) | 20.2 (68.4) | 15.6 (60.1) | 8.6 (47.5) | 1.9 (35.4) | −4.8 (23.4) | 6.3 (43.3) |
| Mean daily minimum °C (°F) | −13.6 (7.5) | −13.4 (7.9) | −8.0 (17.6) | −1.4 (29.5) | 4.7 (40.5) | 10.4 (50.7) | 15.4 (59.7) | 15.9 (60.6) | 10.7 (51.3) | 3.2 (37.8) | −2.7 (27.1) | −9.7 (14.5) | 0.9 (33.6) |
| Record low °C (°F) | −25.3 (−13.5) | −27.8 (−18.0) | −21.8 (−7.2) | −15.6 (3.9) | −4.0 (24.8) | 0.0 (32.0) | 5.5 (41.9) | 6.6 (43.9) | −0.4 (31.3) | −5.1 (22.8) | −15.2 (4.6) | −21.7 (−7.1) | −27.8 (−18.0) |
| Average precipitation mm (inches) | 45.4 (1.79) | 41.3 (1.63) | 69.3 (2.73) | 100.4 (3.95) | 115.2 (4.54) | 77.5 (3.05) | 140.3 (5.52) | 224.1 (8.82) | 164.4 (6.47) | 136.0 (5.35) | 122.9 (4.84) | 73.9 (2.91) | 1,324.3 (52.14) |
| Average snowfall cm (inches) | 121 (48) | 106 (42) | 95 (37) | 27 (11) | 0 (0) | 0 (0) | 0 (0) | 0 (0) | 0 (0) | 0 (0) | 25 (9.8) | 109 (43) | 495 (195) |
| Average precipitation days (≥ 1.0 mm) | 11.1 | 11.4 | 13.0 | 13.3 | 12.0 | 8.7 | 11.0 | 12.1 | 12.5 | 13.8 | 14.9 | 13.3 | 148.6 |
| Mean monthly sunshine hours | 68.0 | 78.0 | 106.8 | 146.8 | 181.2 | 169.3 | 142.0 | 146.0 | 136.0 | 117.5 | 63.8 | 51.7 | 1,403 |
Source 1: Japan Meteorological Agency
Source 2: Japan Meteorological Agency

=== Demographics ===
Per Japanese census data, the population of Hidaka has declined in recent decades.

Historical population
| Year | Pop. | ±% |
|---|---|---|
| 1970 | 21,228 | — |
| 1980 | 18,875 | −11.1% |
| 1990 | 16,976 | −10.1% |
| 2000 | 15,783 | −7.0% |
| 2010 | 13,615 | −13.7% |
| 2020 | 11,279 | −17.2% |

== History ==
Japanese settlement in the area of Hidaka dates from 1881. In 1923, Usappu Village was organized under the second-class town and village system. It was renamed Hidaka in 1943and became town in 1962. In 2002, the mountainous town of Hidaka, facing increasingly difficult municipal management, launched a merger study group with the towns of Biratori and Monbetsu. In 2003, the neighboring towns of Hobetsu and Mukawa also joined the group. However, Biratori expressed reluctance to merge with Monbetsu, the town with the largest population in the area, and this attitude led to Mukawa and Hobetsu withdrawing from the council. In a referendum held in 2004, 60% of Hidaka Town favored a three-town merger (with one-quarter favoring a two-town merger with Biratori). However, in September of that year, Biratori withdrew from the council, stating that it would continue to govern independently. Per a second referendum in 2005, with 70% of Hidaka Town residents supporting the merger. It was decided to use the former Monbetsu town hall as the new town hall, and to name to merged town Hidaka. On March 1, 2006, the town of Monbetsu was officially merged into Hidaka.

== Government ==
Hidaka has a mayor-council form of government with a directly elected mayor and a unicameral town council of 14 members. Hidaka, as part of Hidaka Subprefecture, contributes two members to the Hokkaidō Prefectural Assembly. In terms of national politics, the town is part of the Hokkaidō 9th district of the lower house of the Diet of Japan.

== Economy ==
The main industries in the Monbetsu area are rice farming, field crops, dairy farming, horse breeding, and commercial fishing. The main industries in the Hidaka area are field crops and forestry.

== Education ==
Hidaka has four public elementary schools and four public middle school operated by the town. The town has two public high schools operated by the Hokkaido Board of Education.

== Transportation ==
=== Railways ===
Hidaka has not had any passenger rail service since the discontinuation of the JR Hokkaido Hidaka Main Line since January 2015, due to storm damage. Plans to restore this section of the line have been abandoned, due to declining passenger numbers and very high maintenance costs, and the section was officially closed on 1 April 2021 and replaced by a bus service.

Former stations in Hidaka: Tomikawa - Hidaka-Mombetsu - Toyosato - Kiyohata - Atsuga

=== Highways ===
- Hidaka Expressway
- National Route 235
- National Route 237
- National Route 274

== Local attractions ==
- Shibechari River Basin Chashi Ruins and Appetsu Chashi Ruins National Historic Site
- Saru River Source Primeval Forest, Natural Monument
- Monbetsu Racecourse
- Sarugawa Hot Springs
- Hidaka Mountain Villa Park
- Hidaka International Ski Resort
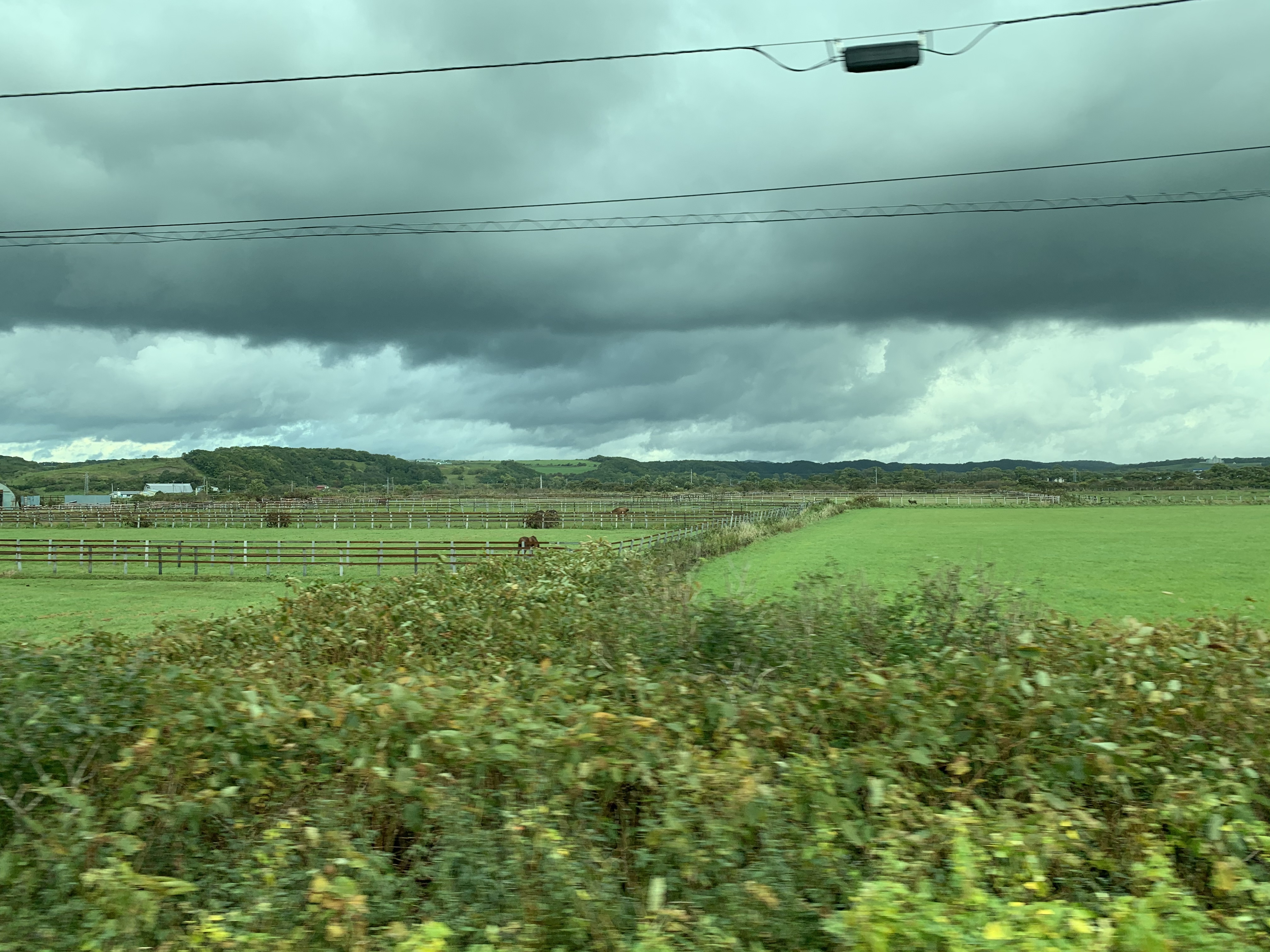
Hidaka panorama

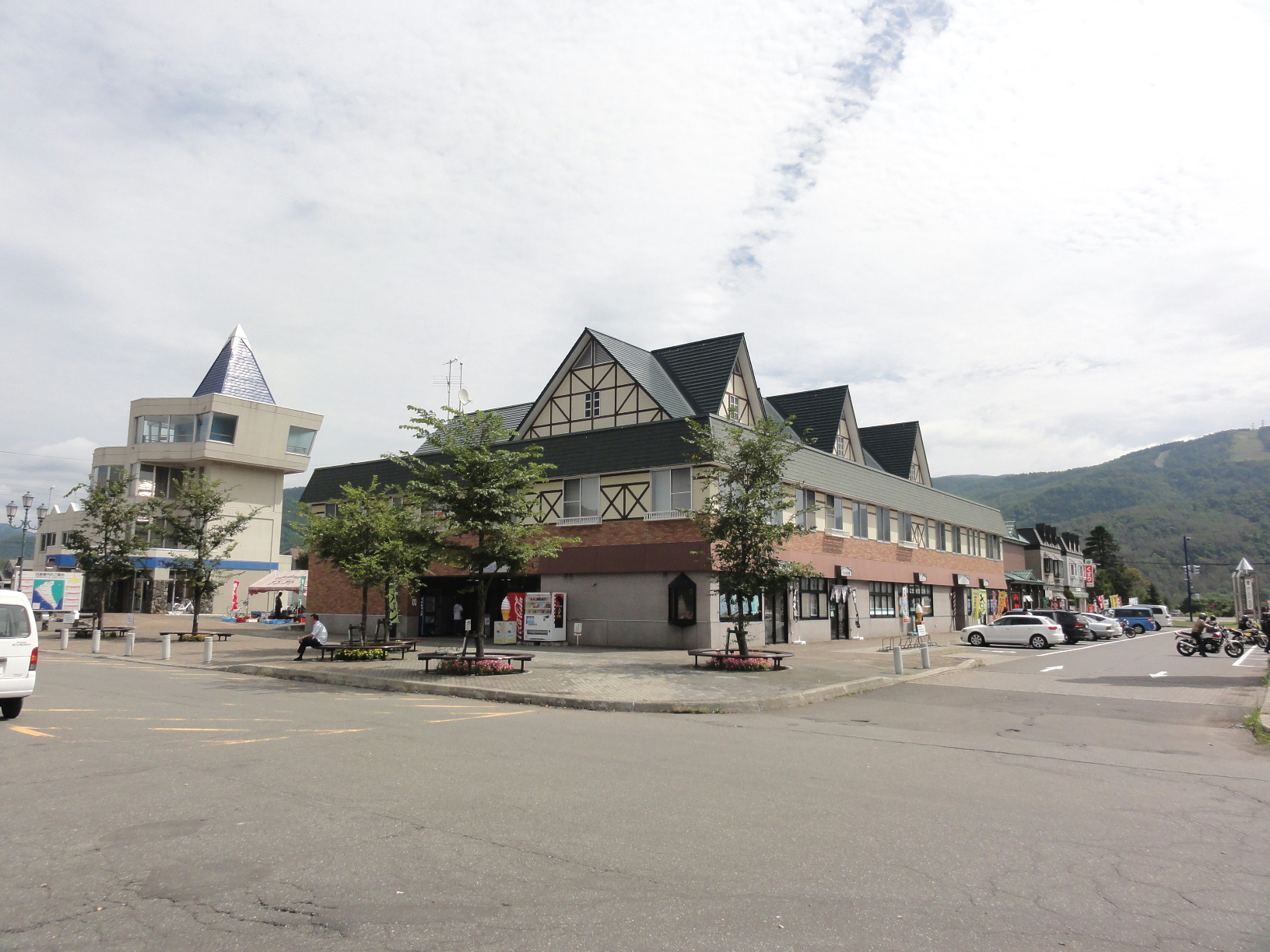
Hidaka road station

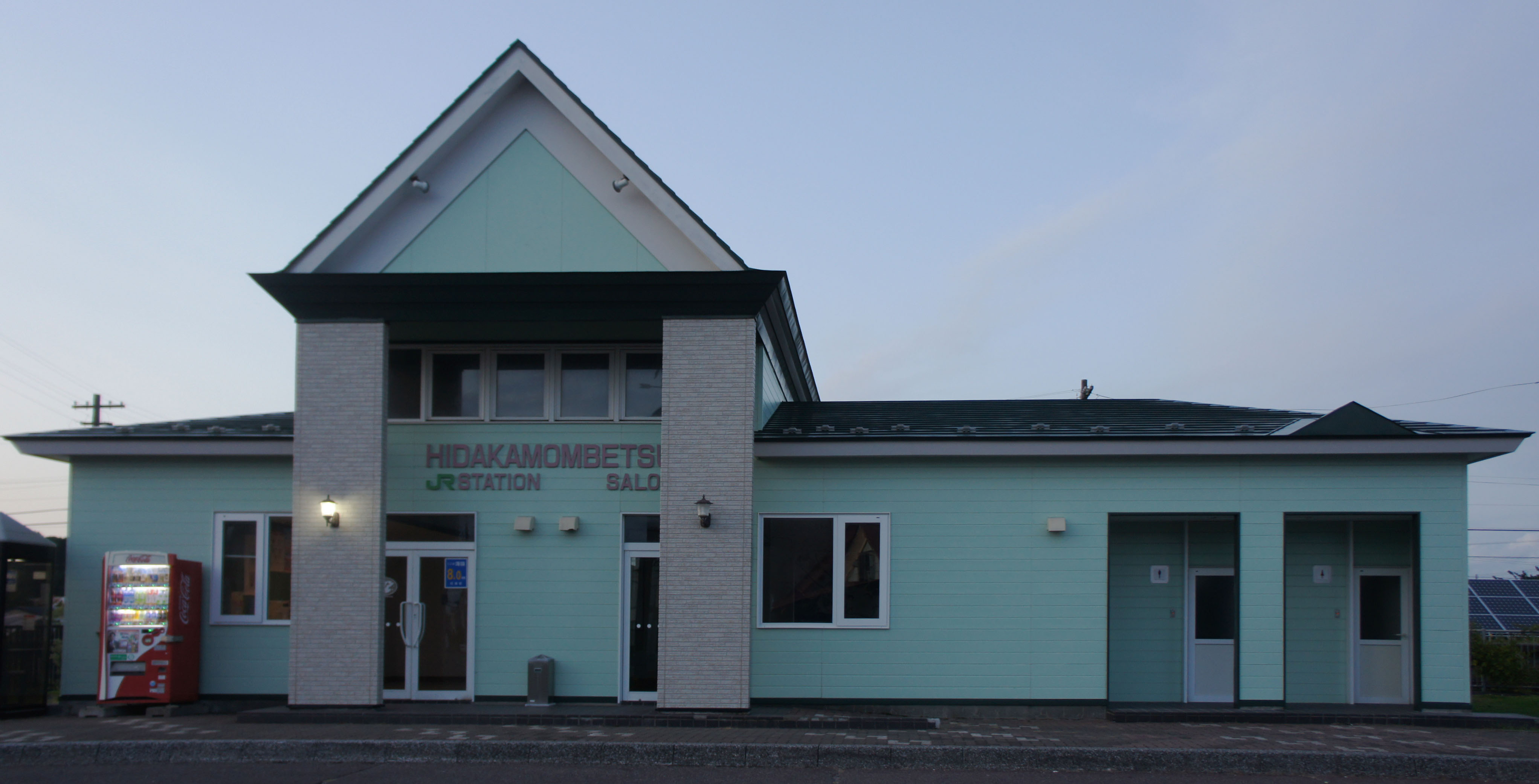
former Monbetsu train station

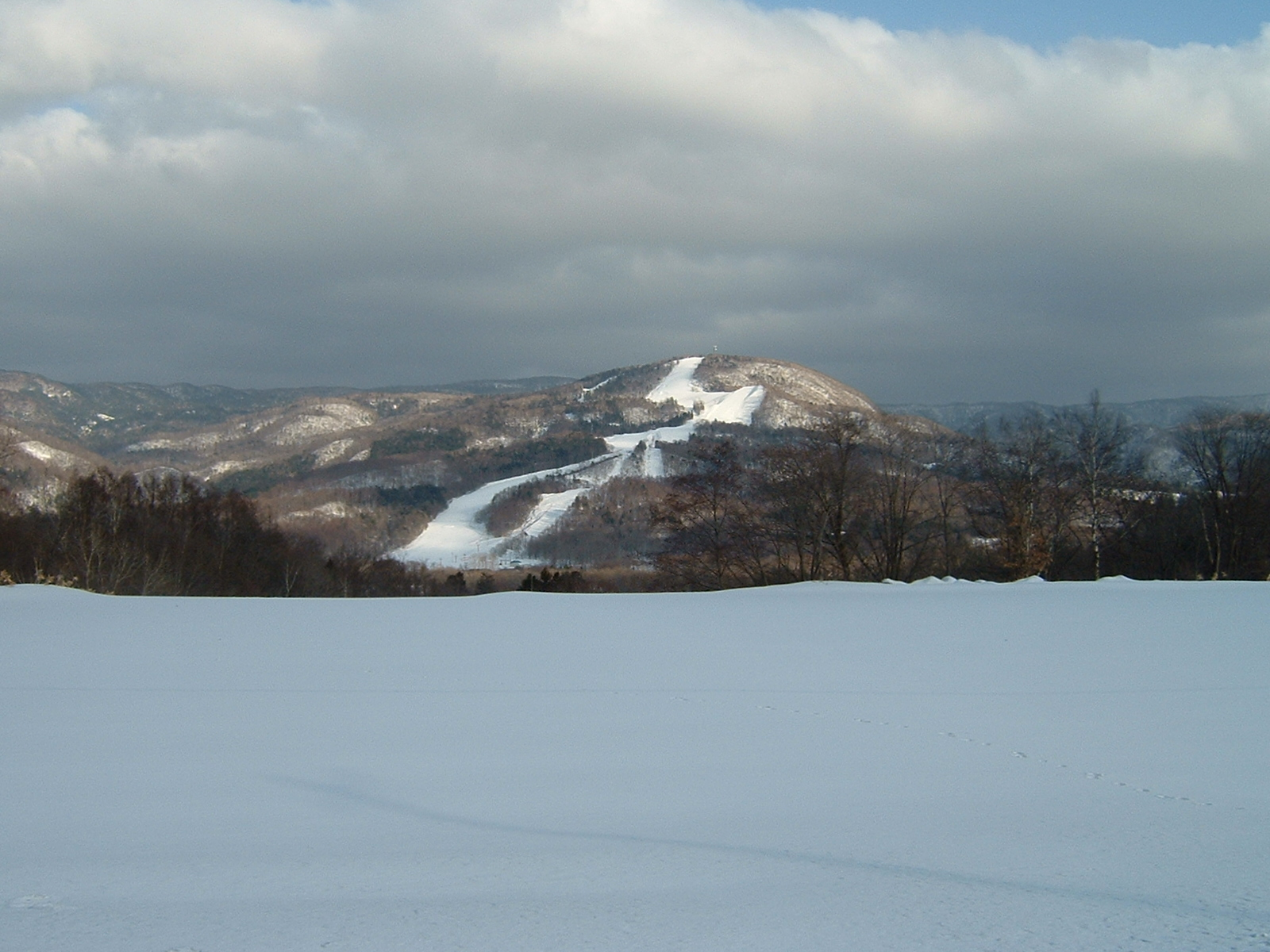
Hidaka International Ski Resort

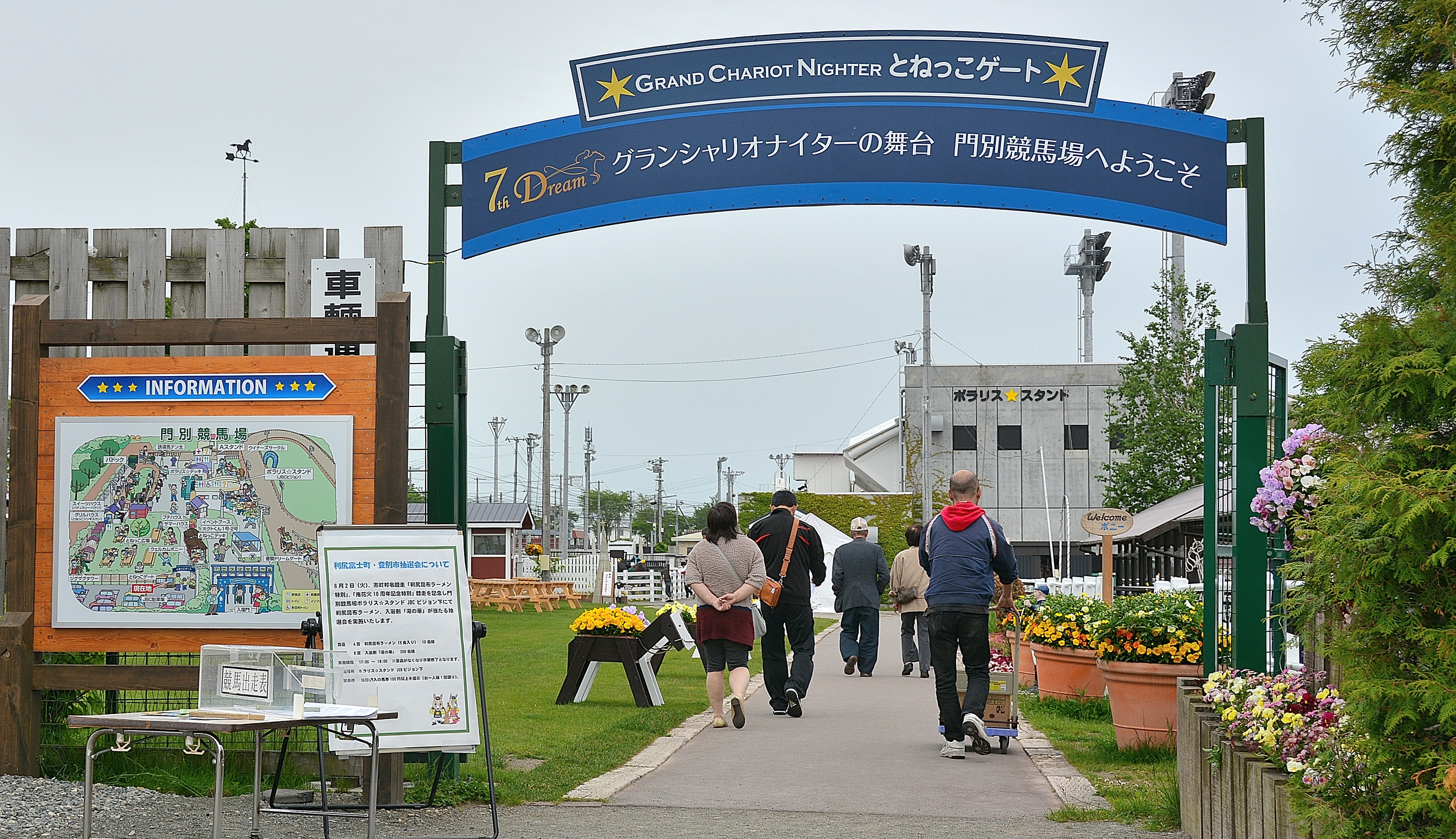
Monbetsu racecorse

=== Mascot ===
Kurumi-chan and Tonekko-kun,
the town's mascots

Hidaka's mascot is Kurumi-chan (クルミちゃん). Her name means "walnut". She is a squirrel who loves walnuts grown in the town. Her companion is Tonekko-kun (とねっこクン) who is a horse from Monbetsu. Tonekko-kun's designer is Hiroshi Kurogane.
