= Nishi-Samani Station =

Railway station in Samani, Hokkaido, Japan

Coordinates: 42.1388°N 142.9086°E

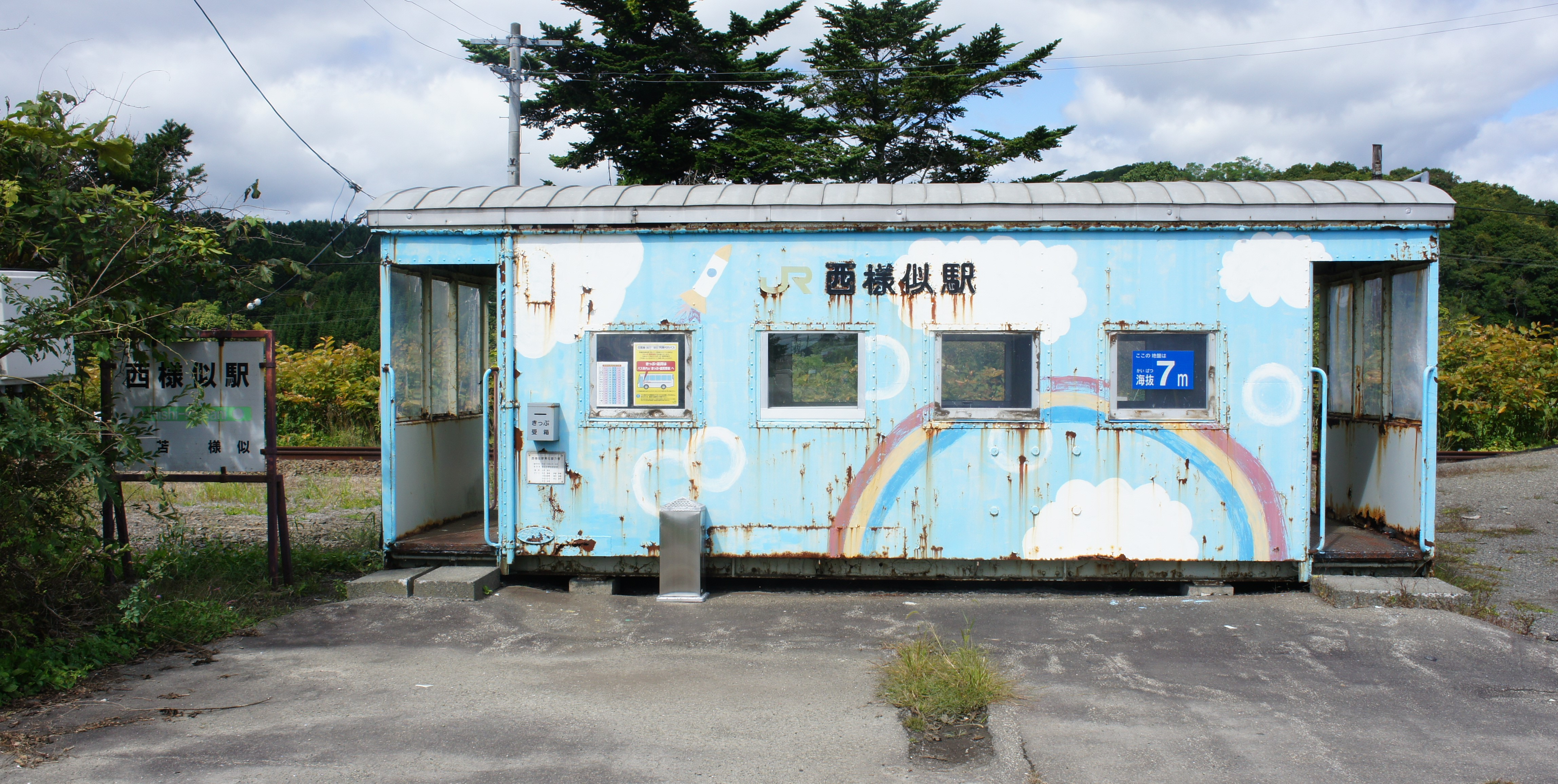
Nishi-Samani Station buildings

Nishi-Samani Station (西様似駅, Nishi-Samani-eki) was a railway station on the Hidaka Main Line in Samani, Hokkaido, Japan, operated by the Hokkaido Railway Company (JR Hokkaido).

Services on the 116 km section of the line between Mukawa and Samani have been suspended indefinitely since January 2015 due to storm damage.

== Lines ==
- Hidaka Main Line

== Adjacent stations ==
«	Service	»
Hidaka Main Line
Utoma	Local	Samani

== History ==
The station opened on 10 August 1937. With the privatization of Japanese National Railways (JNR) on 1 April 1987, the station came under the control of JR Hokkaido.

== See also ==
- List of railway stations in Japan
