= Yūfutsu Station =

Railway station in Tomakomai, Hokkaido, Japan

Coordinates: 42.6319°N 141.7283°E

Yūfutsu Station 勇払駅
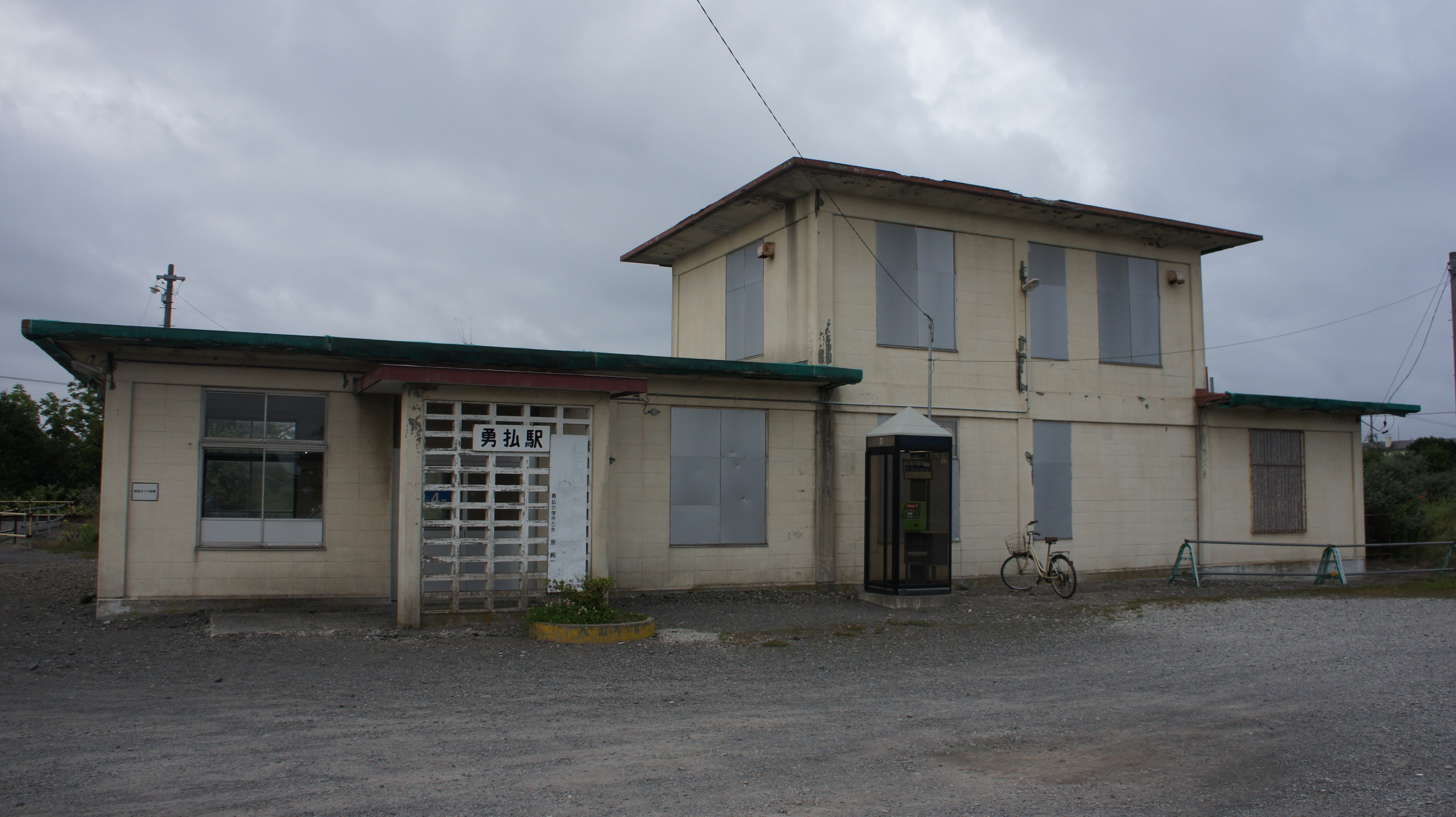
- JR Hidaka Main Line Yufutsu Station Building

General information
- Location: Yūfutsu 142, Tomakomai; Hokkaido Prefecture; Japan
- Operator: JR Hokkaido
- Line: Hidaka Main Line
- Platforms: 1 side platform
- Tracks: 1

Construction
- Structure type: At grade

History
- Opened: 1 October 1913; 112 years ago

Services
Preceding station	JR Hokkaido	Following station
Tomakomai Terminus	Hidaka Main Line	Hama-Atsuma towards Mukawa
Location
- Location within Hokkaido Location within Japan

Yūfutsu Station (勇払駅, Yūfutsu-eki) is a railway station on the Hidaka Main Line in Tomakomai, Hokkaido, Japan, operated by the Hokkaido Railway Company (JR Hokkaido).

== History ==
Tomakomai Light Railway opened the station on October 1, 1913. On December 2, 1962, the station was moved to the present location due to rerouting of the line.
