= Mukawa, Hokkaido =

Mukawa むかわ町
- Town
- Flag Emblem

- Location of Mukawa in Hokkaido (Iburi Subprefecture)

- Location in Japan
- Coordinates: 42°34′N 141°56′E
- Country: Japan
- Region: Hokkaido
- Prefecture: Hokkaido (Iburi Subprefecture)
- District: Yūfutsu

Area
  - Total: 166.43 km^{2} (64.26 sq mi)

Population (April 30, 2017)
  - Total: 8,527
  - Density: 51.23/km^{2} (132.7/sq mi)
- Time zone: UTC+09:00 (JST)
- Climate: Dfb
- Website: www.town.mukawa.lg.jp

Mukawa (むかわ町, Mukawa-chō) is a town located in Iburi Subprefecture, Hokkaido, Japan.

On March 27, 2006, Mukawa (鵡川町) absorbed the town of Hobetsu to create the new town of Mukawa. The new town was given the same name as the former town of Mukawa, but in hiragana, instead of former kanji name.

As of April 30, 2017, the town (including the Hobetsu area) has an estimated population of 8,527, with a total of 4,369 households. The total area is 166.43 km^{2}.

Mukawa is situated on the southern coast of Hokkaido, bordering the Pacific Ocean. It can be accessed via train from Tomakomai. By car, the town is approximately 1/2 hour east of Tomakomai along Route 235.

The town is famed for shishamo, a small fish that is hung on bamboo poles. Shishamo are currently included in the Mukawa town sign. The shishamo are harvested during the Fall season. During this season the town holds a number of shishamo themed events, including a town race in October and Shishamo Matsuri in November.

A large community center in the town features an indoor swimming pool, exercise room, hotel, onsen, cafe, restaurant, and lecture hall. During the late Summer, an obon matsuri is held near the town's community center.

== Population Statistics ==
In recent years, Mukawa has faced an overall decline in population. In 1995, there were 7,853 people and 2,786 households. In 2000, the population declined to 7,232 people with 2,744 households, and by 2005, the population had declined to 6,765 people and 2,698 households. These numbers do not include the population of Mukawa's Hobetsu area.

== Climate ==
Climate data for Mukawa (1991−2020 normals, extremes 1978−present)
Month	Jan	Feb	Mar	Apr	May	Jun	Jul	Aug	Sep	Oct	Nov	Dec	Year
Record high °C (°F)	9.2 (48.6)	9.2 (48.6)	15.5 (59.9)	22.2 (72.0)	28.1 (82.6)	30.5 (86.9)	32.5 (90.5)	34.8 (94.6)	30.0 (86.0)	24.0 (75.2)	18.2 (64.8)	15.0 (59.0)	34.8 (94.6)
Mean daily maximum °C (°F)	−0.7 (30.7)	0.0 (32.0)	3.9 (39.0)	10.1 (50.2)	15.4 (59.7)	18.8 (65.8)	22.4 (72.3)	24.3 (75.7)	22.0 (71.6)	16.1 (61.0)	8.8 (47.8)	1.9 (35.4)	11.9 (53.4)
Daily mean °C (°F)	−6.0 (21.2)	−5.3 (22.5)	−0.4 (31.3)	5.1 (41.2)	10.5 (50.9)	14.6 (58.3)	18.7 (65.7)	20.3 (68.5)	16.9 (62.4)	10.3 (50.5)	3.8 (38.8)	−3.0 (26.6)	7.1 (44.8)
Mean daily minimum °C (°F)	−12.5 (9.5)	−12.1 (10.2)	−5.5 (22.1)	−0.3 (31.5)	5.6 (42.1)	11.0 (51.8)	15.7 (60.3)	16.9 (62.4)	11.7 (53.1)	4.3 (39.7)	−1.6 (29.1)	−8.7 (16.3)	2.0 (35.7)
Record low °C (°F)	−26.2 (−15.2)	−26.7 (−16.1)	−23.9 (−11.0)	−11.7 (10.9)	−3.4 (25.9)	1.5 (34.7)	7.2 (45.0)	6.4 (43.5)	0.6 (33.1)	−5.1 (22.8)	−13.2 (8.2)	−22.8 (−9.0)	−26.7 (−16.1)
Average precipitation mm (inches)	27.8 (1.09)	25.6 (1.01)	41.2 (1.62)	65.7 (2.59)	103.2 (4.06)	86.7 (3.41)	127.5 (5.02)	179.0 (7.05)	141.0 (5.55)	96.3 (3.79)	72.9 (2.87)	44.6 (1.76)	1,018 (40.08)
Average precipitation days (≥ 1.0 mm)	7.9	6.9	8.0	10.2	11.3	9.1	10.7	11.2	10.6	11.1	11.1	8.8	116.9
Mean monthly sunshine hours	131.3	139.8	176.9	175.7	186.5	148.8	124.2	146.3	163.0	160.8	125.6	121.5	1,800.4
Source: JMA

== Transportation ==
=== Rail ===
Mukawa is served by the JR Hokkaido Hidaka Main Line. However, no trains have operated between Mukawa and Samani since January 2015, due to storm damage. Plans to restore this section of the line have been abandoned, due to declining passenger numbers and very high maintenance costs, and the section will be officially closed on 1 April 2021 to be replaced by a bus service.

Stations in Mukawa: ~~Hama-Taura~~ - Mukawa - ~~Shiomi~~

There has been no train service at Shiomi since January 2015, as it falls into the affected section of the line.

== Workforce ==
As of the 2006, as total of 3,884 people are employed in Mukawa (excluding the workforce of Hobetsu). The working population is broken into different categories depending on occupational type and the number of workers, as shown below:

Official Business:	161
Service:	880
Real Estate:	10
Circulation of Money & Insurance:	32
Wholesale Trade & Retail:	550
Transportation & Communication:	178
Electricity, Gas, Thermal Supply & Aqueduct:	10
Production:	349
Construction:	602
Mining:	21
Fishing:	70
Forestry:	28
Farmers:	991
Unclassified:	2

== Land Usage ==
The 2006 Handbook does not distinguish between Hobetsu or Mukawa regarding land usage. The areas of Hobetsu (546.48 km^{2}), and Mukawa (166.43 km^{2}) total to 712.91 km^{2}. Of this total area, the land usage is divided into the following categories:

Housing Site:	5.39 km^{2}
Wilderness:	9.75 km^{2}
Mixed-breed Area:	9.93 km^{2}
Ranch:	13.64 km^{2}
Fields with Crops:	18.9 km^{2}
Rice Fields:	38.51 km^{2}
Swamp:	0.09 km^{2}
Forest:	517.81 km^{2}
Other:	98.89 km^{2}

== Annual expenditure ==
As with the proceeding information, the following comes from the Mukawa 2006 Handbook. The following information regarding the 2005 town expenditures does not consider Mukawa and Hobetsu separately. The unit of currency is millions of yen.

Hygienic	925.30	(10.1%)
Bond	1,603.99	(17.6%)
Public Welfare	1,651.38	(18.2%)
General Affairs	1,476.07	(16.2%)
Civil Works	869.44	(9.5%)
Education	687.74	(7.6%)
Commercial	278.96	(3.1%)
Agriculture, Forestry & Fisheries	353.02	(9.4%)
Fire Fighting	582.83	(6.4%)
Town Assembly	142.10	(1.6%)
Others	19.88	(0.3%)
Total	9,088.91	(100%)

== Annual Income ==
The following information for the 2005 income is also from the Mukawa 2006 Handbook, and as with the annual expenditure, Mukawa and Hobetsu are considered as a unified area. The unit of currency is millions of yen.

Town Bond	1,535.30	(16.6%)
Tax Allocated to Local Governments	4.340.38	(46.8%)
Town Tax	882.07	(9.5%)
Prefecture Subsidy	516.10	(5.6%)
Earnings	528.44	(5.7%)
National Treasury Disbursement	361.89	(3.9%)
Rent & Commission	386.97	(2.0%)
Estate Revenue	102.87	(1.1%)
Beginning Balance	200.12	(2.2%)
Transfer of Money	135.02	(1.4%)
Others	479.15	(5.2%)
Total	9,268.94	(100%)

== Notable people ==
- Seino Araida (1917–2011), Japanese Ainu activist
- Akira Suzuki, chemist, 2010 Nobel Prize in Chemistry winner.
