= Hama-Atsuma Station =

Railway station in Atsuma, Hokkaido, Japan

Coordinates: 42.6069°N 141.8366°E

Hama-Atsuma Station 浜厚真駅
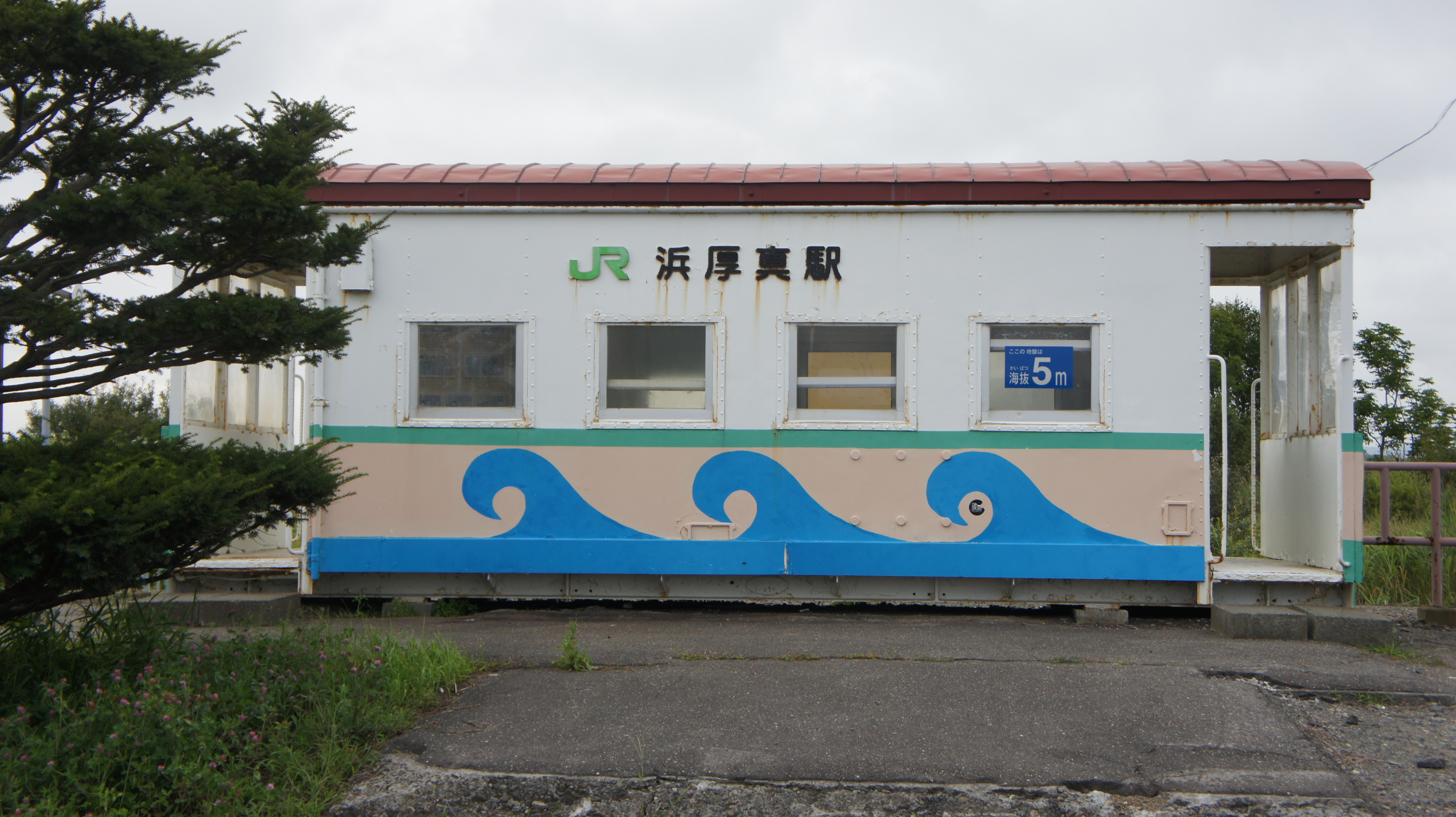
- Station building

General information
- Operator: JR Hokkaido
- Line: Hidaka Main Line
- Platforms: 1 side platform
- Tracks: 2

Construction
- Structure type: At grade

History
- Opened: 1 October 1913; 113 years ago

Services
Preceding station	JR Hokkaido	Following station
Yūfutsu towards Tomakomai	Hidaka Main Line	Mukawa Terminus
Location
- Location within Hokkaido Location within Japan

Hama-Atsuma Station (浜厚真駅, Hama-Atsuma-eki) is a railway station on the Hidaka Main Line in Atsuma, Hokkaidō, Japan, operated by the Hokkaido Railway Company (JR Hokkaido).
