= Niikappu District, Hokkaido =

District in Hokkaido, Japan

Coordinates: 42.569°N 142.509°E

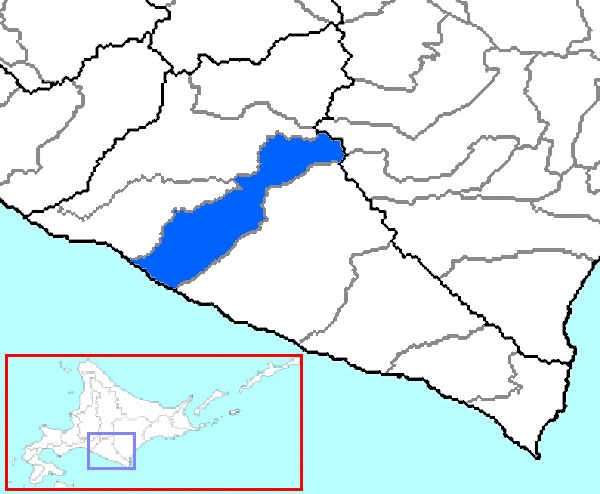
The area of Niikappu District in Hidaka Subprefecture.

Niikappu (新冠郡, Niikappu-gun) is a district located in Hidaka Subprefecture, Hokkaido, Japan.

As of 2010, the district has an estimated population of 5,862 and a density of 10.0 persons per km^{2}. The total area is 585.88 km^{2}.

== Towns and villages ==
- Niikappu
