= Samani Station =

Railway station in Samani, Hokkaido, Japan

Coordinates: 42.1283°N 142.9360°E

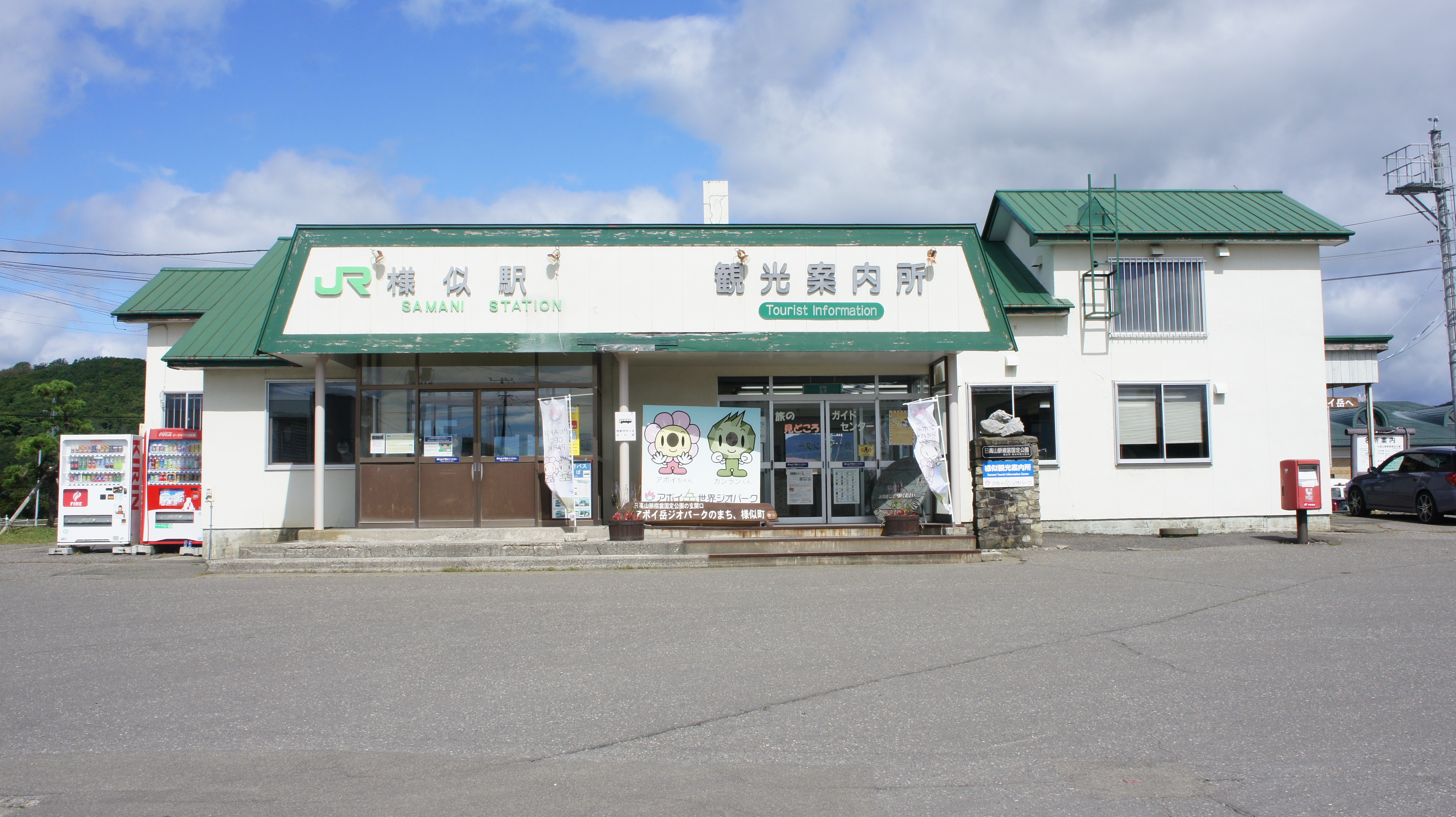
The station building in September 2017

Samani Station (様似駅, Samani-eki) was a railway station on the Hidaka Main Line in Samani, Hokkaido, Japan, operated by the Hokkaido Railway Company (JR Hokkaido).

== Lines ==
Samani Station was the eastern terminus of the 146.5 km Hidaka Main Line from Tomakomai, however services on the 116 km section of the line between Mukawa and Samani have been suspended indefinitely since January 2015 due to storm damage.

== Adjacent stations ==
| « | Service | » |
Hidaka Main Line
| Nishi-Samani | Local | Terminus |

== History ==
The station opened on 10 August 1937. With the privatization of Japanese National Railways (JNR) on 1 April 1987, the station came under the control of JR Hokkaido.

== See also ==
- List of railway stations in Japan
