= Mukawa Station =

Railway station in Mukawa, Hokkaido, Japan

Coordinates: 42°34′44.1″N 141°55′26.1″E

Mukawa Station 鵡川駅
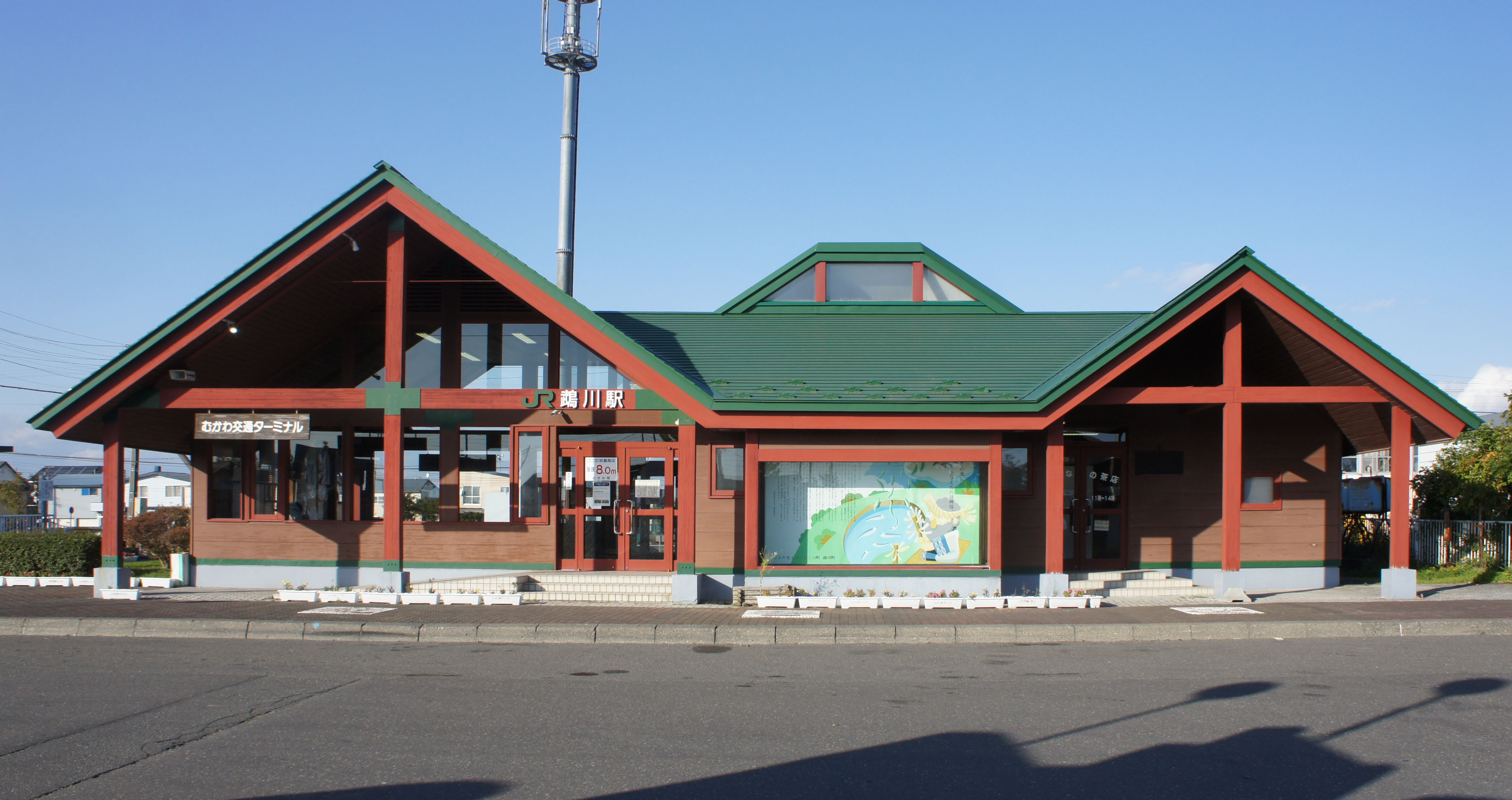
- The station building

General information
- Operator: JR Hokkaido
- Line: Hidaka Main Line
- Platforms: 1 side platform
- Tracks: 1

Construction
- Structure type: At grade

History
- Opened: 1 October 1913; 113 years ago

Services
Preceding station	JR Hokkaido	Following station
Hama-Atsuma towards Tomakomai	Hidaka Main Line	Terminus
Former Services
Preceding station	JR Hokkaido	Following station
Hama-Taura towards Tomakomai	Hidaka Main Line Former services	Shiomi towards Samani
Location
- Location within Hokkaido Location within Japan

Mukawa Station (鵡川駅, Mukawa-eki) is a railway station on the Hidaka Main Line in Mukawa, Hokkaido, Japan, operated by the Hokkaido Railway Company (JR Hokkaido).

Services on the 116 km (72 mi) section of the line between Mukawa and Samani have been suspended indefinitely since January 2015 due to storm damage.

== History ==
The station opened on 1 October 1913. With the privatization of Japanese National Railways (JNR) on 1 April 1987, the station came under the control of JR Hokkaido.

== See also ==
- List of railway stations in Japan
