= List of railway stations in Japan: H =

List of railway stations in Japan

| A | B | C | D | E | F | G | H | I | J | KL | M | N | O | P | R | S | T | U | W | Y | Z |

This list shows the railway stations in Japan that begin with the letter H. This is a subset of the full list of railway stations in Japan.

== Station list ==
=== Ha ===
| Haba Station (Gifu) | 羽場駅 (岐阜県) |
| Haba Station (Nagano) | 羽場駅 (長野県) |
| Habu Station | 埴生駅 |
| Hachigata Station | 鉢形駅 |
| Hachihama Station | 八浜駅 |
| Hachihommatsu Station | 八本松駅 |
| Hachiken Station | 八軒駅 |
| Hachiman Station | 八幡駅 (静岡県) |
| Hachimanmae Station (Kyoto) | 八幡前駅 (京都府) |
| Hachimanmae Station (Wakayama) | 八幡前駅 (和歌山県) |
| Hachimantai Station | 八幡平駅 |
| Hachimanyama Station | 八幡山駅 |
| Hachimori Station | 八森駅 |
| Hachinohe Station | 八戸駅 |
| Hachinohekamotsu Station | 八戸貨物駅（はちのへかもつ） |
| Hachiōji Station | 八王子駅（はちおうじ） |
| Hachiōji-Minamino Station | 八王子みなみ野駅（はちおうじみなみの） |
| Hachirōgata Station | 八郎潟駅（はちろうがた） |
| Hachisu Station | 蓮駅 |
| Hadachi Station | 羽立駅 |
| Hadakajima Station | 波高島駅（はだかじま） |
| Hadano Station | 秦野駅（はだの） |
| Hadasu Station | 波田須駅（はだす） |
| Haenosaki Station | 南風崎駅（はえのさき） |
| Hagadai Station | 芳賀台停留場（はがだい） |
| Haga Industrial Park Management Center Station | 芳賀町工業団地管理センター前停留場（はがちょうこうぎょうだんちかんりせんたーまえ） |
| Haga Takanezawa Industrial Park Station | 芳賀・高根沢工業団地停留場（はがたかねざわこうぎょうだんち） |
| Hage Station | 半家駅（はげ） |
| Hagi Station | 萩駅（はぎ） |
| Hagiharatenjin Station | 萩原天神駅（はぎはらてんじん） |
| Hagino Station | 萩野駅（はぎの） |
| Haginochaya Station | 萩ノ茶屋駅（はぎのちゃや） |
| Haginodai Station | 萩の台駅（はぎのだい） |
| Hagiurashōgakkō-mae Station | 萩浦小学校前駅（はぎうらしょうがっこうまえ） |
| Hagiwara Station (Aichi) | 萩原駅 (愛知県)（はぎわら） |
| Hagiwara Station (Fukuoka) | 萩原駅 (福岡県)（はぎわら） |
| Hagiyama Station | 萩山駅（はぎやま） |
| Hagoromo Station | 羽衣駅（はごろも） |
| Hagurazaki Station | 羽倉崎駅（はぐらざき） |
| Hagure Station | 波久礼駅（はぐれ） |
| Haguro Station (Aichi) | 羽黒駅 (愛知県)（はぐろ） |
| Haguro Station (Ibaraki) | 羽黒駅 (茨城県)（はぐろ） |
| Haguroshita Station | 羽黒下駅（はぐろした） |
| Hagyū Station | 萩生駅（はぎゅう） |
| Haibara Station | 榛原駅（はいばら） |
| Haijima Station | 拝島駅（はいじま） |
| Haiki Station | 早岐駅（はいき） |
| Hainuzuka Station | 羽犬塚駅（はいぬづか） |
| Haji Station | 土師駅（はじ） |
| Hajinosato Station | 土師ノ里駅（はじのさと） |
| Hakariishi Station | 計石駅（はかりいし） |
| Hakata Station | 博多駅（はかた） |
| Hakataminami Station | 博多南駅（はかたみなみ） |
| Hakawa Station | 波川駅（はかわ） |
| Hakenomiya Station | 八景水谷駅（はけのみや） |
| Haki Station | 葉木駅（はき） |
| Hakkeijima Station | 八景島駅（はっけいじま） |
| Hakodate Station | 函館駅（はこだて） |
| Hakoishi Station | 箱石駅（はこいし） |
| Hakonegasaki Station | 箱根ヶ崎駅（はこねがさき） |
| Hakone-Itabashi Station | 箱根板橋駅（はこねいたばし） |
| Hakone-Yumoto Station | 箱根湯本駅（はこねゆもと） |
| Hakotsukuri Station | 箱作駅（はこつくり） |
| Hakozaki Station | 箱崎駅（はこざき） |
| Hakozaki-Kyūdaimae Station | 箱崎九大前駅（はこざききゅうだいまえ） |
| Hakozaki-Miyamae Station | 箱崎宮前駅（はこざきみやまえ） |
| Hakuba Station | 白馬駅（はくば） |
| Hakuba-Ōike Station | 白馬大池駅（はくばおおいけ） |
| Hakui Station | 羽咋駅（はくい） |
| Hakunōkōkōmae Station | 柏農高校前駅（はくのうこうこうまえ） |
| Hakuraku Station | 白楽駅（はくらく） |
| Hakurindai Station | 柏林台駅（はくりんだい） |
| Hakusan Station (Niigata) | 白山駅 (新潟県)（はくさん） |
| Hakusan Station (Tokyo) | 白山駅 (東京都)（はくさん） |
| Hakusannagataki Station | 白山長滝駅（はくさんながたき） |
| Hakushima Station (Hiroden) | 白島停留場（はくしま） |
| Hakushima Station (Astram Line) | 白島駅（はくしま） |
| Hakuyachō Station | 柏矢町駅（はくやちょう） |
| Hakuyō Station | 柏陽駅（はくよう） |
| Hama Station | 浜駅（はま） |
| Hama-Atsuma Station | 浜厚真駅（はまあつま） |
| Hamachō Station | 浜町駅（はまちょう） |
| Hamada Station | 浜田駅（はまだ） |
| Hamadayama Station | 浜田山駅（はまだやま） |
| Hamaderaekimae Station | 浜寺駅前駅（はまでらえきまえ） |
| Hamaderakōen Station | 浜寺公園駅（はまでらこうえん） |
| Hamagōchi Station | 浜河内駅（はまごうち） |
| Hamahara Station | 浜原駅（はまはら） |
| Hamakazumi Station | 浜加積駅（はまかづみ） |
| Hama-Kanaya Station | 浜金谷駅（はまかなや） |
| Hama-Kawasaki Station | 浜川崎駅（はまかわさき） |
| Hamakita Station | 浜北駅（はまきた） |
| Hama-Koshimizu Station | 浜小清水駅（はまこしみず） |
| Hamamatsu Station | 浜松駅（はままつ） |
| Hamamatsuchō Station | 浜松町駅（はままつちょう） |
| Hamamatsudaigakumae Station | 浜松大学前駅（はままつだいがくまえ） |
| Hamamura Station | 浜村駅（はまむら） |
| Hamanaka Station | 浜中駅（はまなか） |
| Hamanako-Sakume Station | 浜名湖佐久米駅（はまなこさくめ） |
| Hamano Station | 浜野駅（はまの） |
| Hamanomiya Station | 浜の宮駅（はまのみや） |
| Hamasaka Station | 浜坂駅（はまさか） |
| Hamasaki Station | 浜崎駅（はまさき） |
| Hamataura Station | 浜田浦駅（はまたうら） |
| Hamayamakōen-Kitaguchi Station | 浜山公園北口駅（はまやまこうえんきたぐち） |
| Hamayoshida Station | 浜吉田駅（はまよしだ） |
| Hamura Station | 羽村駅（はむら） |
| Hanabatake Station | 花畑駅（はなばたけ） |
| Hanaizumi Station | 花泉駅（はないずみ） |
| Hanakoganei Station | 花小金井駅（はなこがねい） |
| Hanakuma Station | 花隈駅（はなくま） |
| Hanamaki Station | 花巻駅（はなまき） |
| Hanamakikūkō Station | 花巻空港駅（はなまきくうこう） |
| Hanami Station | 花見駅（はなみ） |
| Hanamizukidōri Station | はなみずき通駅（はなみずきどおり） |
| Hanamizuzaka Station | 花水坂駅（はなみずざか） |
| Hanandō Station | 花堂駅（はなんどう） |
| Hanasaki Station (Hokkaido) | 花咲駅（はなさき） |
| Hanasaki Station (Saitama) | 花崎駅（はなさき） |
| Hanashiro Station | 花白駅（はなしろ） |
| Hanataguchi Station | 花田口駅（はなたぐち） |
| Hanaten Station | 放出駅（はなてん） |
| Hanawa Station | 花輪駅（はなわ） |
| Hanayama Station | 花山駅（はなやま） |
| Hanazono Station (Kagawa) | 花園駅 (香川県)（はなぞの） |
| Hanazono Station (Kyoto) | 花園駅 (京都府)（はなぞの） |
| Hanazonochō Station | 花園町駅（はなぞのちょう） |
| Handa Station | 半田駅（はんだ） |
| Handafutō Station | 半田埠頭駅（はんだふとう） |
| Handaguchi Station | 半田口駅（はんだぐち） |
| Handaibyōinmae Station | 阪大病院前駅（はんだいびょういんまえ） |
| Hane Station | 波根駅（はね） |
| Haneda Airport Terminal 1 Station | 羽田空港第1ターミナル駅（はねだくうこうだいいちたーみなる） |
| Haneda Airport Terminal 1·2 Station | 羽田空港第1・第2ターミナル駅（はねだくうこうだいいちだいにたーみなる） |
| Haneda Airport Terminal 2 Station | 羽田空港第2ターミナル駅（はねだくうこうだいにたーみなる） |
| Haneda Airport Terminal 3 Station | 羽田空港第3ターミナル駅（はねだくうこうだいさんたーみなる） |
| Haneo Station | 羽根尾駅（はねお） |
| Hanno Station | 母野駅（はんの） |
| Hannō Station | 飯能駅（はんのう） |
| Hanoura Station | 羽ノ浦駅（はのうら） |
| Hanshin-Kokudō Station | 阪神国道駅（はんしんこくどう） |
| Hanuki Station | 羽貫駅（はぬき） |
| Hanyū Station | 羽生駅（はにゅう） |
| Hanyūda Station | 羽生田駅（はにゅうだ） |
| Hanzōmon Station | 半蔵門駅（はんぞうもん） |
| Haobi Station | 羽帯駅（はおび） |
| Hara Station (Aichi) | 原駅 (愛知県)（はら） |
| Hara Station (Kagawa) | 原駅 (香川県)（はら） |
| Hara Station (Shizuoka) | 原駅 (静岡県)（はら） |
| Harada Station | 原田駅 (静岡県)（はらだ） |
| Haraichi Station | 原市駅（はらいち） |
| Haraigawa Station | 払川駅（はらいがわ） |
| Harajuku Station | 原宿駅（はらじゅく） |
| Haramizu Station | 原水駅（はらみず） |
| Haramukō Station | 原向駅（はらむこう） |
| Harano Station | 原野駅（はらの） |
| Haranomachi Station | 原ノ町駅（はらのまち） |
| Haranoya Station | 原谷駅（はらのや） |
| Haratai Station | 腹帯駅（はらたい） |
| Harataima Station | 原当麻駅（はらたいま） |
| Harborland Station | ハーバーランド駅 |
| Harima Station | 播磨駅（はりま） |
| Harimachō Station | 播磨町駅（はりまちょう） |
| Harima-Katsuhara Station | はりま勝原駅（はりまかつはら） |
| Harima-Shimosato Station | 播磨下里駅（はりましもさと） |
| Harima-Shingū Station | 播磨新宮駅（はりましんぐう） |
| Harima-Takaoka Station | 播磨高岡駅（はりまたかおか） |
| Harima-Tokusa Station | 播磨徳久駅（はりまとくさ） |
| Harimayabashi Station | はりまや橋駅（はりまやばし） |
| Harima-Yokota Station | 播磨横田駅（はりまよこた） |
| Harinakano Station | 針中野駅（はりなかの） |
| Hariusu Station | 張碓駅（はりうす） |
| Harmony Hall Station | ハーモニーホール駅 |
| Haruda Station | 原田駅 (福岡県)（はるだ） |
| Harue Station | 春江駅（はるえ） |
| Haruhino Station | はるひ野駅（はるひの） |
| Haruka Station | 春賀駅（はるか） |
| Haruki Station | 春木駅（はるき） |
| Harukiba Station | 春木場駅（はるきば） |
| Harumachi Station | 原町駅（はるまち） |
| Haruta Station | 春田駅（はるた） |
| Harutachi Station | 春立駅（はるたち） |
| Haruyama Station | 晴山駅（はるやま） |
| Hasama Station | 飯山満駅（はさま） |
| Hase Station (Hyogo) | 長谷駅 (兵庫県)（はせ） |
| Hase Station (Kanagawa) | 長谷駅 (神奈川県)（はせ） |
| Hasedera Station | 長谷寺駅（はせでら） |
| Hashi Station | 波子駅（はし） |
| Hashibetsu Station | 箸別駅（はしべつ） |
| Hashihama Station | 波止浜駅（はしはま） |
| Hashikami Station | 階上駅（はしかみ） |
| Hashikura Station | 箸蔵駅（はしくら） |
| Hashimashiyakushomae Station | 羽島市役所前駅（はしましやくしょまえ） |
| Hashimoto Station (Fukuoka) | 橋本駅 (福岡県)（はしもと） |
| Hashimoto Station (Kanagawa) | 橋本駅 (神奈川県)（はしもと） |
| Hashimoto Station (Kyoto) | 橋本駅 (京都府)（はしもと） |
| Hashimoto Station (Wakayama) | 橋本駅 (和歌山県)（はしもと） |
| Hashio Station | 箸尾駅（はしお） |
| Hashioka Station | 端岡駅（はしおか） |
| Hashirano Station | 柱野駅（はしらの） |
| Hassamu Station | 発寒駅（はっさむ） |
| Hassamu-Chūō Station | 発寒中央駅（はっさむちゅうおう） |
| Hassamuminami Station | 発寒南駅（はっさむみなみ） |
| Hasuda Station | 蓮田駅（はすだ） |
| Hasugaike Station | 蓮ヶ池駅（はすがいけ） |
| Hasumachi (Babakinenkōen-mae) Station | 蓮町（馬場記念公園前）駅（はすまちばばきねんこうえんまえ） |
| Hasune Station | 蓮根駅（はすね） |
| Hasunuma Station | 蓮沼駅（はすぬま） |
| Hata Station (Nagano) | 波田駅（はた） |
| Hata Station (Hyogo) | 葉多駅（はた） |
| Hatabu Station | 幡生駅（はたぶ） |
| Hatada Station | 畑田駅（はただ） |
| Hatae Station | 波多江駅（はたえ） |
| Hatagaya Station | 幡ヶ谷駅（はたがや） |
| Hatakeda Station | 畠田駅（はたけだ） |
| Hataki Station | 八多喜駅（はたき） |
| Hatama Station | 端間駅（はたま） |
| Hatanodai Station | 旗の台駅（はたのだい） |
| Hataura Station | 波多浦駅（はたうら） |
| Hataya Station | 幡屋駅（はたや） |
| Hatchōbori Station (Hiroshima) | 八丁堀停留場（はっちょうぼり） |
| Hatchōbori Station (Tokyo) | 八丁堀駅（はっちょうぼり） |
| Hatchōmuta Station | 八丁牟田駅（はっちょうむた） |
| Hatchōnawate Station | 八丁畷駅（はっちょうなわて） |
| Hatogaya Station | 鳩ヶ谷駅（はとがや） |
| Hatonosu Station | 鳩ノ巣駅（はとのす） |
| Hatori Station | 羽鳥駅（はとり） |
| Hatsudai Station | 初台駅（はつだい） |
| Hatsuishi Station | 初石駅（はついし） |
| Hatsukaichi Station | 廿日市駅（はつかいち） |
| Hatsukaichi-shiyakusho-mae Station | 廿日市市役所前駅（はつかいちしやくしょまえ） |
| Hatsukari Station | 初狩駅（はつかり） |
| Hatsuno Station | 初野駅（はつの） |
| Hatsushiba Station | 初芝駅（はつしば） |
| Hatsushima Station | 初島駅（はつしま） |
| Hatsutomi Station | 初富駅（はつとみ） |
| Hatta Station | 八田駅（はった） |
| Hattaushi Station | 初田牛駅（はったうし） |
| Hattori Station | 服部駅 (岡山県)（はっとり） |
| Hattorigawa Station | 服部川駅（はっとりがわ） |
| Hattori-tenjin Station | 服部天神駅（はっとりてんじん） |
| Hattō Station | 八東駅（はっとう） |
| Haya Station | 芳養駅（はや） |
| Hayabusa Station | 隼駅（はやぶさ） |
| Hayadōri Station | 早通駅（はやどおり） |
| Hayaguchi Station | 早口駅（はやぐち） |
| Hayahoshi Station | 速星駅（はやほし） |
| Hayakawa Station | 早川駅（はやかわ） |
| Hayakita Station | 早来駅（はやきた） |
| Hayase Station | 早瀬駅（はやせ） |
| Hayashi Station | 林駅（はやし） |
| Hayashima Station | 早島駅（はやしま） |
| Hayashimichi Station | 林道駅（はやしみち） |
| Hayashino Station | 林野駅（はやしの） |
| Hayashisaki-Matsuekaigan Station | 林崎松江海岸駅（はやしさきまつえかいがん） |
| Hayashizaki Station | 林崎駅（はやしざき） |
| Hayato Station (Fukushima) | 早戸駅（はやと） |
| Hayato Station (Kagoshima) | 隼人駅（はやと） |
| Hayatsukikazumi Station | 早月加積駅（はやつきかづみ） |
| Hayuka Station | 羽床駅（はゆか） |
| Hazakawa Station | 迫川駅（はざかわ） |
| Hazama Station (Kagawa) | 羽間駅（はざま） |
| Hazama Station (Tokyo) | 狭間駅（はざま） |
| Hazawa yokohama-kokudai Station | 羽沢横浜国大駅（はざわよこはまこくだい） |
| Haze Station | 波瀬駅（はぜ） |

=== He ===
| Hebita Station | 蛇田駅（へびた） |
| Hegawa Station | 辺川駅（へがわ） |
| Heguri Station | 平群駅（へぐり） |
| Heiandōri Station | 平安通駅（へいあんどおり） |
| Heijō Station | 平城駅（へいじょう） |
| Heisei Station | 平成駅（へいせい） |
| Heita Station | 平田駅 (岩手県)（へいた） |
| Heiwa Station | 平和駅（へいわ） |
| Heiwadai Station (Chiba) | 平和台駅 (千葉県)（へいわだい） |
| Heiwadai Station (Tokyo) | 平和台駅 (東京都)（へいわだい） |
| Heiwadōri Station | 平和通駅（へいわどおり） |
| Heiwadōri-Itchōme Station | 平和通一丁目駅（へいわどおりいっちょうめ） |
| Heiwajima Station | 平和島駅（へいわじま） |
| Heizu Station | 平津駅（へいづ） |
| Hekikai-Furui Station | 碧海古井駅（へきかいふるい） |
| Hekinan Station | 碧南駅（へきなん） |
| Hekinan-Chūō Station | 碧南中央駅（へきなんちゅうおう） |
| Hemi Station | 逸見駅（へみ） |
| Henashi Station | 艫作駅（へなし） |
| Hesaka Station | 戸坂駅（へさか） |
| Heta Station | 戸田駅 (山口県)（へた） |

=== Hi ===
| Hibari Station | 陽羽里駅（ひばり） |
| Hibarigaoka Station (Hokkaido) | ひばりが丘駅（ひばりがおか） |
| Hibarigaoka Station (Tokyo) | ひばりヶ丘駅（ひばりがおか） |
| Hibarigaoka-Hanayashiki Station | 雲雀丘花屋敷駅（ひばりがおかはなやしき） |
| Hibayama Station | 比婆山駅（ひばやま） |
| Hibino Station (Aisai, Aichi) | 日比野駅 (愛知県愛西市)（ひびの） |
| Hibino Station (Nagoya) | 日比野駅 (名古屋市)（ひびの） |
| Hibiya Station | 日比谷駅（ひびや） |
| Hida-Furukawa Station | 飛騨古川駅（ひだふるかわ） |
| Hida-Hagiwara Station | 飛騨萩原駅（ひだはぎわら） |
| Hida-Hosoe Station | 飛騨細江駅（ひだほそえ） |
| Hida-Ichinomiya Station | 飛騨一ノ宮駅（ひだいちのみや） |
| Hidaka-Horobetsu Station | 日高幌別駅（ひだかほろべつ） |
| Hidaka-Mitsuishi Station | 日高三石駅（ひだかみついし） |
| Hidaka-Mombetsu Station | 日高門別駅（ひだかもんべつ） |
| Hida-Kanayama Station | 飛騨金山駅（ひだかなやま） |
| Hidaka-Tōbetsu Station | 日高東別駅（ひだかとうべつ） |
| Hida-Kokufu Station | 飛騨国府駅（ひだこくふ） |
| Hida-Miyada Station | 飛騨宮田駅（ひだみやだ） |
| Hida-Osaka Station | 飛騨小坂駅（ひだおさか） |
| Hidariishi Station | 左石駅（ひだりいし） |
| Hidariseki Station | 左堰駅（ひだりせき） |
| Hideshio Station | 日出塩駅（ひでしお） |
| Hideya Station | 日出谷駅（ひでや） |
| Hido Station | 比土駅（ひど） |
| Hie Station | 比延駅（ひえ） |
| Hieizan-Sakamoto Station | 比叡山坂本駅（ひえいざんさかもと） |
| Higashi-Abiko Station | 東我孫子駅（ひがしあびこ） |
| Higashi-Agano Station | 東吾野駅（ひがしあがの） |
| Higashi-Ainonai Station | 東相内駅（ひがしあいのない） |
| Higashi-Akasaka Station | 東赤坂駅（ひがしあかさか） |
| Higashi-Akiru Station | 東秋留駅（ひがしあきる） |
| Higashi-Amagi Station | 東甘木駅（ひがしあまぎ） |
| Higashi-Aohara Station | 東青原駅（ひがしあおはら） |
| Higashi-Aomori Station | 東青森駅（ひがしあおもり） |
| Higashi-Aoyama Station | 東青山駅（ひがしあおやま） |
| Higashi-Asahikawa Station | 東旭川駅（ひがしあさひかわ） |
| Higashi-Azuma Station | 東あずま駅（ひがしあずま） |
| Higashi-Beppu Station | 東別府駅（ひがしべっぷ） |
| Higashibetsuin Station | 東別院駅（ひがしべついん） |
| Higashi-Biwajima Station | 東枇杷島駅（ひがしびわじま） |
| Higashi-Chiba Station | 東千葉駅（ひがしちば） |
| Higashichō Station | 東町駅（ひがしちょう） |
| Higashidate Station | 東館駅（ひがしだて） |
| Higashi-Fuchū Station | 東府中駅（ひがしふちゅう） |
| Higashi-Fujishima Station | 東藤島駅（ひがしふじしま） |
| Higashi-Fujiwara Station | 東藤原駅（ひがしふじわら） |
| Higashi-Fukuma Station | 東福間駅（ひがしふくま） |
| Higashi-Fukushima Station | 東福島駅（ひがしふくしま） |
| Higashi-Fukuyama Station | 東福山駅（ひがしふくやま） |
| Higashi-Funabashi Station | 東船橋駅（ひがしふなばし） |
| Higashi-Funaoka Station | 東船岡駅（ひがしふなおか） |
| Higashi-Fusamoto Station | 東総元駅（ひがしふさもと） |
| Higashi-Fushimi Station | 東伏見駅（ひがしふしみ） |
| Higashi-Fussa Station | 東福生駅（ひがしふっさ） |
| Higashi-Futami Station | 東二見駅（ひがしふたみ） |
| Higashi-Gejō Station | 東下条駅（ひがしげじょう） |
| Higashi-Ginza Station | 東銀座駅（ひがしぎんざ） |
| Higashi-Gyōda Station | 東行田駅（ひがしぎょうだ） |
| Higashi-Hachimori Station | 東八森駅（ひがしはちもり） |
| Higashi-Hatchō Station | 東八町駅（ひがしはっちょう） |
| Higashi-Hagi Station | 東萩駅（ひがしはぎ） |
| Higashi-Hagoromo Station | 東羽衣駅（ひがしはごろも） |
| Higashi-Hakuraku Station | 東白楽駅（ひがしはくらく） |
| Higashihama Station | 東浜駅（ひがしはま） |
| Higashi-Hanawa Station | 東花輪駅（ひがしはなわ） |
| Higashi-Hanazono Station | 東花園駅（ひがしはなぞの） |
| Higashi-Hannō Station | 東飯能駅（ひがしはんのう） |
| Higashi-Hashisaki Station | 東觜崎駅（ひがしはしさき） |
| Higashi-Hazu Station | 東幡豆駅（ひがしはず） |
| Higashi-Hie Station | 東比恵駅（ひがしひえ） |
| Higashi-Himeji Station | 東姫路駅（ひがしひめじ） |
| Higashi-Hiroshima Station | 東広島駅（ひがしひろしま） |
| Higashihonganjimae Station | 東本願寺前駅（ひがしほんがんじまえ） |
| Higashi-Horonuka Station | 東幌糠駅（ひがしほろぬか） |
| Higashi-Ichiki Station | 東市来駅（ひがしいちき） |
| Higashi-Ikebukuro Station | 東池袋駅（ひがしいけぶくろ） |
| Higashi-Ikebukuro-Yonchōme Station | 東池袋四丁目駅（ひがしいけぶくろよんちょうめ） |
| Higashi-Ikoma Station | 東生駒駅（ひがしいこま） |
| Higashi-Isahaya Station | 東諌早駅（ひがしいさはや） |
| Higashi-Ishiguro Station | 東石黒駅（ひがしいしぐろ） |
| Higashi-Ishinden Station | 東一身田駅（ひがしいしんでん） |
| Higashi-Iwase Station | 東岩瀬駅（ひがしいわせ） |
| Higashi-Iwatsuki Station | 東岩槻駅（ひがしいわつき） |
| Higashi-Jūjō Station | 東十条駅（ひがしじゅうじょう） |
| Higashi-Kaijin Station | 東海神駅（ひがしかいじん） |
| Higashi-Kaimon Station | 東開聞駅（ひがしかいもん） |
| Higashi-Kaizuka Station | 東貝塚駅（ひがしかいづか） |
| Higashi-Kakogawa Station | 東加古川駅（ひがしかこがわ） |
| Higashi-Kanagawa Station | 東神奈川駅（ひがしかながわ） |
| Higashi-Kanai Station | 東金井駅（ひがしかない） |
| Higashi-Kanazawa Station | 東金沢駅（ひがしかなざわ） |
| Higashi-Karatsu Station | 東唐津駅（ひがしからつ） |
| Higashi-Kariya Station | 東刈谷駅（ひがしかりや） |
| Higashi-Kashiwazaki Station | 東柏崎駅（ひがしかしわざき） |
| Higashi-Katsura Station | 東桂駅（ひがしかつら） |
| Higashi-Kawaguchi Station | 東川口駅（ひがしかわぐち） |
| Higashi-Kishiwada Station | 東岸和田駅（ひがしきしわだ） |
| Higashi-Kitazawa Station | 東北沢駅（ひがしきたざわ） |
| Higashi-Kiyokawa Station | 東清川駅（ひがしきよかわ） |
| Higashi-Koganei Station | 東小金井駅（ひがしこがねい） |
| Higashi-Kohama Station | 東粉浜駅（ひがしこはま） |
| Higashi-Koizumi Station | 東小泉駅（ひがしこいずみ） |
| Higashi-Kokura Station | 東小倉駅（ひがしこくら） |
| Higashi-Komoro Station | 東小諸駅（ひがしこもろ） |
| Higashi-Kōge Station | 東郡家駅（ひがしこおげ） |
| Higashi-Kōenji Station | 東高円寺駅（ひがしこうえんじ） |
| Higashikōgyōmae Station | 東工業前駅（ひがしこうぎょうまえ） |
| Higashi-Kunebetsu Station | 東久根別駅（ひがしくねべつ） |
| Higashi-Kurume Station | 東久留米駅（ひがしくるめ） |
| Higashi-Kushiro Station | 東釧路駅（ひがしくしろ） |
| Higashikuyakushomae Station | 東区役所前駅（ひがしくやくしょまえ） |
| Higashi-Maizuru Station | 東舞鶴駅（ひがしまいづる） |
| Higashi-Matsubara Station | 東松原駅（ひがしまつばら） |
| Higashi-Matsudo Station | 東松戸駅（ひがしまつど） |
| Higashi-Matsue Station (Shimane) | 東松江駅 (島根県)（ひがしまつえ） |
| Higashi-Matsue Station (Wakayama) | 東松江駅 (和歌山県)（ひがしまつえ） |
| Higashi-Matsusaka Station | 東松阪駅（ひがしまつさか） |
| Higashi-Matsuyama Station | 東松山駅（ひがしまつやま） |
| Higashi-Menda Station | 東免田駅（ひがしめんだ） |
| Higashi-Mihama Station | 東美浜駅（ひがしみはま） |
| Higashi-Mikkaichi Station | 東三日市駅（ひがしみっかいち） |
| Higashi-Mikuni Station | 東三国駅（ひがしみくに） |
| Higashi-Minato Station | 東湊駅（ひがしみなと） |
| Higashi-Mito Station | 東水戸駅（ひがしみと） |
| Higashi-Miyahara Station | 東宮原駅（ひがしみやはら） |
| Higashi-Mizumaki Station | 東水巻駅（ひがしみずまき） |
| Higashi-Monzen Station | 東門前駅（ひがしもんぜん） |
| Higashi-Mori Station | 東森駅（ひがしもり） |
| Higashi-Moro Station | 東毛呂駅（ひがしもろ） |
| Higashi-Mukō Station | 東向日駅（ひがしむこう） |
| Higashi-Mukōjima Station | 東向島駅（ひがしむこうじま） |
| Higashi-Murayama Station | 東村山駅（ひがしむらやま） |
| Higashi-Muroran Station | 東室蘭駅（ひがしむろらん） |
| Higashi-Nagahara Station | 東長原駅（ひがしながはら） |
| Higashi-Nagasaki Station | 東長崎駅（ひがしながさき） |
| Higashi-Nagasawa Station | 東長沢駅（ひがしながさわ） |
| Higashi-Nagoyakō Station | 東名古屋港駅（ひがしなごやこう） |
| Higashi-Nakagami Station | 東中神駅（ひがしなかがみ） |
| Higashi-Nakama Station | 東中間駅（ひがしなかま） |
| Higashi-Nakano Station | 東中野駅（ひがしなかの） |
| Higashi-Nakatsu Station | 東中津駅（ひがしなかつ） |
| Higashi-Nakayama Station | 東中山駅（ひがしなかやま） |
| Higashi-Namerikawa Station | 東滑川駅（ひがしなめりかわ） |
| Higashi-Narawa Station | 東成岩駅（ひがしならわ） |
| Higashi-Narita Station | 東成田駅（ひがしなりた） |
| Higashi-Naruo Station | 東鳴尾駅（ひがしなるお） |
| Higashine Station | 東根駅（ひがしね） |
| Higashi-Nihombashi Station | 東日本橋駅（ひがしにほんばし） |
| Higashi-Niigata Station | 東新潟駅（ひがしにいがた） |
| Higashi-Niitsu Station | 東新津駅（ひがしにいつ） |
| Higashi-Nikkawa Station | 東新川駅 (群馬県)（ひがしにっかわ） |
| Higashino Station (Gifu) | 東野駅 (岐阜県)（ひがしの） |
| Higashino Station (Kyoto) | 東野駅 (京都府)（ひがしの） |
| Higashinodanchi Station | ひがし野団地駅（ひがしのだんち） |
| Higashi-Nojiri Station | 東野尻駅（ひがしのじり） |
| Higashi-Noshiro Station | 東能代駅（ひがしのしろ） |
| Higashi-Obama Station | 東小浜駅（ひがしおばま） |
| Higashi-Ōbuke Station | 東大更駅（ひがしおおぶけ） |
| Higashi-Ōdate Station | 東大館駅（ひがしおおだて） |
| Higashi-Ōgaki Station | 東大垣駅（ひがしおおがき） |
| Higashi-ogu-sanchōme Station | 東尾久三丁目停留場（ひがしおぐさんちょうめ） |
| Higashi-Oiwake Station | 東追分駅（ひがしおいわけ） |
| Higashi-Ōjima Station | 東大島駅（ひがしおおじま） |
| Higashi-Okayama Station | 東岡山駅（ひがしおかやま） |
| Higashi-Okazaki Station | 東岡崎駅（ひがしおかざき） |
| Higashi-Ōme Station | 東青梅駅（ひがしおうめ） |
| Higashi-Ōmiya Station | 東大宮駅（ひがしおおみや） |
| Higashi-Onomichi Station | 東尾道駅（ひがしおのみち） |
| Higashi-Ōsaki Station | 東大崎駅（ひがしおおさき） |
| Higashi-Ōte Station | 東大手駅（ひがしおおて） |
| Higashi-Rinkan Station | 東林間駅（ひがしりんかん） |
| Higashi-Rokusen Station | 東六線駅（ひがしろくせん） |
| Higashi-Saigawa-Sanshirō Station | 東犀川三四郎駅（ひがしさいがわさんしろう） |
| Higashi-Sakata Station | 東酒田駅（ひがしさかた） |
| Higashi-Sanjō Station | 東三条駅（ひがしさんじょう） |
| Higashi-Sano Station | 東佐野駅（ひがしさの） |
| Higashi-Sapporo Station | 東札幌駅（ひがしさっぽろ） |
| Higashi-Sendai Station | 東仙台駅（ひがしせんだい） |
| Higashi-Shikagoe Station | 東鹿越駅（ひがししかごえ） |
| Higashi-Shingi Station | 東新木駅（ひがししんぎ） |
| Higashi-Shinjō Station | 東新庄駅（ひがししんじょう） |
| Higashi-Shinjuku Station | 東新宿駅（ひがししんじゅく） |
| Higashi-Shinkawa Station | 東新川駅 (山口県)（ひがししんかわ） |
| Higashi-Shinmachi Station | 東新町駅（ひがししんまち） |
| Higashi-Shinminato Station | 東新湊駅（ひがししんみなと） |
| Higashi-Shiogama Station | 東塩釜駅（ひがししおがま） |
| Higashi-Shiroishi Station | 東白石駅（ひがししろいし） |
| Higashi-Shizunai Station | 東静内駅（ひがししずない） |
| Higashi-Shizuoka Station | 東静岡駅（ひがししずおか） |
| Higashi-Shukugo Station | 東宿郷停留場（ひがししゅくごう） |
| Higashisono Station | 東園駅（ひがしその） |
| Higashi-Sōja Station | 東総社駅（ひがしそうじゃ） |
| Higashi-Sukumo Station | 東宿毛駅（ひがしすくも） |
| Higashi-Suma Station | 東須磨駅（ひがしすま） |
| Higashi-Tabira Station | 東田平駅（ひがしたびら） |
| Higashi-Tagonoura Station | 東田子の浦駅（ひがしたごのうら） |
| Higashi-Takasaki Station | 東高崎駅（ひがしたかさき） |
| Higashi-Takasu Station | 東高須駅（ひがしたかす） |
| Higashi-Taku Station | 東多久駅（ひがしたく） |
| Higashi-Taragi Station | 東多良木駅（ひがしたらぎ） |
| Higashi-Tarumi Station | 東垂水駅（ひがしたるみ） |
| Higashi-Tengachaya Station | 東天下茶屋駅（ひがしてんがちゃや） |
| Higashi-Tokorozawa Station | 東所沢駅（ひがしところざわ） |
| Higashi-Tomioka Station | 東富岡駅（ひがしとみおか） |
| Higashi-Tondendōri Station | 東屯田通駅（ひがしとんでんどおり） |
| Higashi-Totsuka Station | 東戸塚駅（ひがしとつか） |
| Higashi-Toyama Station | 東富山駅（ひがしとやま） |
| Higashi-Tsuno Station | 東都農駅（ひがしつの） |
| Higashi-Tsuyama Station | 東津山駅（ひがしつやま） |
| Higashi-Tsuzuki Station | 東都筑駅（ひがしつづき） |
| Higashi-Umeda Station | 東梅田駅（ひがしうめだ） |
| Higashiura Station | 東浦駅（ひがしうら） |
| Higashi-Urawa Station | 東浦和駅（ひがしうらわ） |
| Higashi-Washinomiya Station | 東鷲宮駅（ひがしわしのみや） |
| Higashiyama Station (Hokkaido) | 東山駅 (北海道)（ひがしやま） |
| Higashiyama Station (Kyoto) | 東山駅 (京都府)（ひがしやま） |
| Higashiyama Station (Nara) | 東山駅 (奈良県)（ひがしやま） |
| Higashi-Yamata Station | 東山田駅（ひがしやまた） |
| Higashi-Yamakita Station | 東山北駅（ひがしやまきた） |
| Higashiyamakōen Station (Aichi) | 東山公園駅 (愛知県)（ひがしやまこうえん） |
| Higashiyamakōen Station (Tottori) | 東山公園駅 (鳥取県)（ひがしやまこうえん） |
| Higashi-Yamanashi Station | 東山梨駅（ひがしやまなし） |
| Higashi-Yamashiro Station | 東山代駅（ひがしやましろ） |
| Higashiyamatoshi Station | 東大和市駅（ひがしやまとし） |
| Higashi-Yamoto Station | 東矢本駅（ひがしやもと） |
| Higashi-Yatsuo Station | 東八尾駅（ひがしやつお） |
| Higashi-Yodogawa Station | 東淀川駅（ひがしよどがわ） |
| Higashi-Yokota Station | 東横田駅（ひがしよこた） |
| Higashi-Yūki Station | 東結城駅（ひがしゆうき） |
| Higashi-Zushi Station | 東逗子駅（ひがしずし） |
| Higata Station | 干潟駅（ひがた） |
| Higiri Station | 日切駅（ひぎり） |
| Higobashi Station | 肥後橋駅（ひごばし） |
| Higo-Futami Station | 肥後二見駅（ひごふたみ） |
| Higo-Ikura Station | 肥後伊倉駅（ひごいくら） |
| Higo-Kōda Station | 肥後高田駅（ひごこうだ） |
| Higo-Nagahama Station | 肥後長浜駅（ひごながはま） |
| Higo-Nishinomura Station | 肥後西村駅（ひごにしのむら） |
| Higo-Ōzu Station | 肥後大津駅（ひごおおづ） |
| Higoshi Station | 樋越駅（ひごし） |
| Higo-Tanoura Station | 肥後田浦駅（ひごたのうら） |
| Higuchi Station (Ibaraki) | ひぐち駅（ひぐち） |
| Higuchi Station (Saitama) | 樋口駅（ひぐち） |
| Hiji Station | 日出駅（ひじ） |
| Hijidai Station | 比地大駅（ひじだい） |
| Hijirikōgen Station | 聖高原駅（ひじりこうげん） |
| Hijiyama-bashi Station | 比治山橋駅（ひじやまばし） |
| Hijiyama-shita Station | 比治山下駅（ひじやました） |
| Hikari Station | 光駅（ひかり） |
| Hikarigaoka Station | 光が丘駅（ひかりがおか） |
| Hikarinomori Station | 光の森駅（ひかりのもり） |
| Hikawadai Station | 氷川台駅（ひかわだい） |
| Hiketa Station | 引田駅（ひけた） |
| Hikifune Station | 曳舟駅（ひきふね） |
| Hikiji Station | 引治駅（ひきじ） |
| Hikime Station | 蟇目駅（ひきめ） |
| Hikone Station | 彦根駅（ひこね） |
| Hikoneguchi Station | 彦根口駅（ひこねぐち） |
| Hikone-Serikawa Station | ひこね芹川駅（ひこねせりかわ） |
| Hikosaki Station | 彦崎駅（ひこさき） |
| Hikosan Station | 彦山駅（ひこさん） |
| Hime Station | 姫駅（ひめ） |
| Himeji Station | 姫路駅（ひめじ） |
| Himeji-Bessho Station | ひめじ別所駅（ひめじべっしょ） |
| Himejikamotsu Station | 姫路貨物駅（ひめじかもつ） |
| Himejima Station | 姫島駅（ひめじま） |
| Himekawa Station (Hokkaido) | 姫川駅 (北海道)（ひめかわ） |
| Himekawa Station (Niigata) | 姫川駅 (新潟県)（ひめかわ） |
| Himematsu Station | 姫松駅（ひめまつ） |
| Himemiya Station | 姫宮駅（ひめみや） |
| Himi Station | 氷見駅（ひみ） |
| Hina Station | 比奈駅（ひな） |
| Hinaga Station (Mie) | 日永駅（ひなが） |
| Hinaga Station (Aichi) | 日長駅（ひなが） |
| Hinaguonsen Station | 日奈久温泉駅（ひなぐおんせん） |
| Hinase Station | 日生駅（ひなせ） |
| Hinata Station | 日当駅（ひなた） |
| Hinatawada Station | 日向和田駅（ひなたわだ） |
| Hinatayama Station | 日当山駅（ひなたやま） |
| Hineno Station | 日根野駅（ひねの） |
| Hino Station (Nagano) | 日野駅 (長野県)（ひの） |
| Hino Station (Shiga) | 日野駅 (滋賀県)（ひの） |
| Hino Station (Tokyo) | 日野駅 (東京都)（ひの） |
| Hinobori Station | 日登駅（ひのぼり） |
| Hinode Station | 日の出駅（ひので） |
| Hinodechō Station | 日ノ出町駅（ひのでちょう） |
| Hinoharu Station | 日野春駅（ひのはる） |
| Hinomiko Station | 日御子駅（ひのみこ） |
| Hinuma Station | 涸沼駅（ひぬま） |
| Hioka Station | 日岡駅（ひおか） |
| Hira Station (Aichi) | 比良駅 (愛知県)（ひら） |
| Hira Station (Shiga) | 比良駅 (滋賀県)（ひら） |
| Hirabari Station | 平針駅（ひらばり） |
| Hirabayashi Station (Niigata) | 平林駅 (新潟県)（ひらばやし） |
| Hirabayashi Station (Osaka) | 平林駅 (大阪府)（ひらばやし） |
| Hirafu Station | 比羅夫駅（ひらふ） |
| Hirafuku Station | 平福駅（ひらふく） |
| Hiragi Station | 平木駅（ひらぎ） |
| Hiragishi Station (Sapporo Municipal Subway) | 平岸駅 (札幌市)（ひらぎし） |
| Hiragishi Station (Akabira, Hokkaido) | 平岸駅 (北海道赤平市)（ひらぎし） |
| Hirahara Station | 平原駅（ひらはら） |
| Hirahata Station | 平端駅（ひらはた） |
| Hirai Station (Ehime) | 平井駅 (愛媛県)（ひらい） |
| Hirai Station (Tokyo) | 平井駅 (東京都)（ひらい） |
| Hiraishi Station (Akita) | 平石駅（ひらいし） |
| Hiraishi Station (Tochigi) | 平石停留場（ひらいし） |
| Hiraishi-chuo Elementary School | 平石中央小学校前停留場（ひらいしちゅうおうしょうがっこうまえ） |
| Hiraiso Station | 平磯駅（ひらいそ） |
| Hiraiwa Station | 平岩駅（ひらいわ） |
| Hiraizumi Station | 平泉駅（ひらいずみ） |
| Hiraka Station | 平賀駅（ひらか） |
| Hirakatakōen Station | 枚方公園駅（ひらかたこうえん） |
| Hirakatashi Station | 枚方市駅（ひらかたし） |
| Hirakawa Station | 平川駅（ひらかわ） |
| Hiraki Station | 開駅（ひらき） |
| Hirakida Station | 平木田駅（ひらきだ） |
| Hirako Station | 平子駅（ひらこ） |
| Hirakura Station | 平倉駅（ひらくら） |
| Hirama Station | 平間駅（ひらま） |
| Hiramatsu Station | 平松駅（ひらまつ） |
| Hiranai Station | 平内駅（ひらない） |
| Hiranda Station | ひらんだ駅 |
| Hirano Station (Fukushima) | 平野駅 (福島県)（ひらの） |
| Hirano Station (Hyogo) | 平野駅 (兵庫県)（ひらの） |
| Hirano Station (JR West) | 平野駅 (JR西日本)（ひらの） |
| Hirano Station (Osaka Metro) | 平野駅 (Osaka Metro)（ひらの） |
| Hiranumabashi Station | 平沼橋駅（ひらぬまばし） |
| Hiraoka Station (Nagano) | 平岡駅（ひらおか） |
| Hiraoka Station (Osaka) | 枚岡駅（ひらおか） |
| Hirata Station (Kochi) | 平田駅 (高知県)（ひらた） |
| Hirata Station (Nagano) | 平田駅 (長野県)（ひらた） |
| Hirata Station (Shiga) | 平田駅 (滋賀県)（ひらた） |
| Hiratachō Station | 平田町駅（ひらたちょう） |
| Hirataki Station | 平滝駅（ひらたき） |
| Hirato-bashi Station | 平戸橋駅（ひらとばし） |
| Hiratsuka Station | 平塚駅（ひらつか） |
| Hiratsuto Station | 平津戸駅（ひらつと） |
| Hirayama Station | 平山駅（ひらやま） |
| Hirayamajōshikōen Station | 平山城址公園駅（ひらやまじょうしこうえん） |
| Hiregasaki Station | 鰭ヶ崎駅（ひれがさき） |
| Hiro Station | 広駅（ひろ） |
| Hirodaifuzokugakkō-mae Station | 広大附属学校前駅（ひろだいふぞくがっこうまえ） |
| Hiroden-ajina Station | 広電阿品駅（ひろでんあじな） |
| Hiroden-hatsukaichi Station | 広電廿日市駅（ひろでんはつかいち） |
| Hiroden-honsha-mae Station | 広電本社前駅（ひろでんほんしゃまえ） |
| Hiroden-itsukaichi Station | 広電五日市駅（ひろでんいつかいち） |
| Hiroden-miyajima-guchi Station | 広電宮島口駅（ひろでんみやじまぐち） |
| Hiroden-nishi-hiroshima Station | 広電西広島駅（ひろでんにしひろしま(こい)） |
| Hiro-Gōdo Station | 広神戸駅（ひろごうど） |
| Hirohata Station | 広畑駅（ひろはた） |
| Hirokawa Beach Station | 広川ビーチ駅（ひろかわびーち） |
| Hiroki Station | 広木駅（ひろき） |
| Hirokōji Station (Mie) | 広小路駅（ひろこうじ） |
| Hirokōji Station (Toyama) | 広小路停留場（ひろこうじ） |
| Hirokōshita Station | 弘高下駅（ひろこうした） |
| Hirono Station (Fukushima) | 広野駅 (福島県)（ひろの） |
| Hirono Station (Hyogo) | 広野駅 (兵庫県)（ひろの） |
| Hirono Golf-jō-mae Station | 広野ゴルフ場前駅（ひろのごるふじょうまえ） |
| Hiroo Station | 広尾駅（ひろお） |
| Hirooka Station | 広丘駅（ひろおか） |
| Hirosaki Station | 弘前駅（ひろさき） |
| Hirosaki-Gakuindai-mae Station | 弘前学院大前駅（ひろさきがくいんだいまえ） |
| Hirosaki-Higashikōmae Station | 弘前東高前駅（ひろさきひがしこうまえ） |
| Hirose-dōri Station | 広瀬通駅（ひろせどおり） |
| Hirose-Yachō-no-Mori Station | ひろせ野鳥の森駅（ひろせやちょうのもり） |
| Hiroshima Station | 広島駅（ひろしま） |
| Hiroshima Station (Hiroden) | 広島駅|広島電鉄本線|広島駅（ひろしま） |
| Hiroshima Freight Terminal Station | 広島貨物ターミナル駅（ひろしまかもつたーみなる） |
| Hiroshima Port Station | 広島港駅（ひろしまこう(うじな)） |
| Hirota Station | 広田駅（ひろた） |
| Hiroto Station | 広戸駅（ひろと） |
| Hirowara Station | 広原駅（ひろわら） |
| Hirui Station | 昼飯駅（ひるい） |
| Hisai Station | 久居駅（ひさい） |
| Hisanohama Station | 久ノ浜駅（ひさのはま） |
| Hisaya-Ōdōri Station | 久屋大通駅（ひさやおおどおり） |
| Hishima Station | 比島駅（ひしま） |
| Hishiro Station | 日代駅（ひしろ） |
| Hita Station | 日田駅（ひた） |
| Hitachi Station | 日立駅（ひたち） |
| Hitachi-Aoyagi Station | 常陸青柳駅（ひたちあおやぎ） |
| Hitachi-Daigo Station | 常陸大子駅（ひたちだいご） |
| Hitachi-Kōnosu Station | 常陸鴻巣駅（ひたちこうのす） |
| Hitachinai Station | 比立内駅（ひたちない） |
| Hitachino-Ushiku Station | ひたち野うしく駅（ひたちのうしく） |
| Hitachi-Ogawa Station | 常陸小川駅（ひたちおがわ） |
| Hitachi-Ōmiya Station | 常陸大宮駅（ひたちおおみや） |
| Hitachi-Ōta Station | 常陸太田駅（ひたちおおた） |
| Hitachi-Taga Station | 常陸多賀駅（ひたちたが） |
| Hitachi-Tsuda Station | 常陸津田駅（ひたちつだ） |
| Hitoichiba Station | 一日市場駅（ひといちば） |
| Hitomaru Station | 人丸駅（ひとまる） |
| Hitomarumae Station | 人丸前駅（ひとまるまえ） |
| Hitomi Station | 人見駅（ひとみ） |
| Hitotsubashigakuen Station | 一橋学園駅（ひとつばしがくえん） |
| Hitotsugi Station | 一ツ木駅（ひとつぎ） |
| Hitoyoshi Station | 人吉駅（ひとよし） |
| Hitoyoshi-Onsen Station | 人吉温泉駅（ひとよしおんせん） |
| Hitsu Station | 比津駅（ひつ） |
| Hiu Station | 日宇駅（ひう） |
| Hiushinai Station | 緋牛内駅（ひうしない） |
| Hiwa Station | 日羽駅（ひわ） |
| Hiwada Station | 日和田駅（ひわだ） |
| Hiwasa Station | 日和佐駅（ひわさ） |
| Hiyodorigoe Station | 鵯越駅（ひよどりごえ） |
| Hiyoshi Station (Kanagawa) | 日吉駅 (神奈川県)（ひよし） |
| Hiyoshi Station (Kyoto) | 日吉駅 (京都府)（ひよし） |
| Hiyoshichō Station | 日吉町駅（ひよしちょう） |
| Hiyoshi-Honchō Station | 日吉本町駅（ひよしほんちょう） |
| Hizen-Asahi Station | 肥前旭駅（ひぜんあさひ） |
| Hizen-Iida Station | 肥前飯田駅（ひぜんいいだ） |
| Hizen-Ōura Station | 肥前大浦駅（ひぜんおおうら） |
| Hizen-Fumoto Station | 肥前麓駅（ひぜんふもと） |
| Hizen-Hama Station | 肥前浜駅（ひぜんはま） |
| Hizen-Kashima Station | 肥前鹿島駅（ひぜんかしま） |
| Hizen-Koga Station | 肥前古賀駅（ひぜんこが） |
| Hizen-Kubo Station | 肥前久保駅（ひぜんくぼ） |
| Hizen-Nagano Station | 肥前長野駅（ひぜんながの） |
| Hizen-Nagata Station | 肥前長田駅（ひぜんながた） |
| Hizen-Nanaura Station | 肥前七浦駅（ひぜんななうら） |
| Hizen-Ryūō Station | 肥前竜王駅（ひぜんりゅうおう） |
| Hizen-Shiroishi Station | 肥前白石駅（ひぜんしろいし） |
| Hizume Station | 日詰駅（ひづめ） |

=== Ho ===
| Hobara Station | 保原駅（ほばら） |
| Hobo Station | 保々駅（ほぼ） |
| Hōdatsu Station | 宝達駅（ほうだつ） |
| Hōden Station | 宝殿駅（ほうでん） |
| Hodogaya Station | 保土ヶ谷駅（ほどがや） |
| Hodokubo Station | 程久保駅（ほどくぼ） |
| Hōei Station | 蓬栄駅（ほうえい） |
| Hōfu Station | 防府駅（ほうふ） |
| Hōfu-Kamotsu Station | 防府貨物駅（ほうふかもつ） |
| Hōgi Station | 宝木駅（ほうぎ） |
| Hōjōmachi Station | 北条町駅（ほうじょうまち） |
| Hōkaiin Station | 法界院駅（ほうかいいん） |
| Hōki-Daisen Station | 伯耆大山駅（ほうきだいせん） |
| Hōki-Mizoguchi Station | 伯耆溝口駅（ほうきみぞぐち） |
| Hokkaidō-Iryōdaigaku Station | 北海道医療大学駅（ほっかいどういりょうだいがく） |
| Hokkeguchi Station | 法華口駅（ほっけぐち） |
| Hōkoku Station | 方谷駅（ほうこく） |
| Hokota Station | 鉾田駅（ほこた） |
| Hokuhoku-Ōshima Station | ほくほく大島駅（ほくほくおおしま） |
| Hokunō Station | 北濃駅（ほくのう） |
| Hokusei Station | 北星駅（ほくせい） |
| Hokuseichūōkōenguchi Station | 北勢中央公園口駅（ほくせいちゅうおうこうえんぐち） |
| Hokutetsu-Kanazawa Station | 北鉄金沢駅（ほくてつかなざわ） |
| Homi Station | 保見駅（ほみ） |
| Hommachi Station | 本町駅（ほんまち） |
| Hommachi-Gochōme Station | 本町五丁目駅（ほんまちごちょうめ） |
| Hommachi-Rokuchōme Station | 本町六丁目駅（ほんまちろくちょうめ） |
| Hommachi-Sanchōme Station | 本町三丁目駅（ほんまちさんちょうめ） |
| Hommachi-Yonchōme Station | 本町四丁目駅（ほんまちよんちょうめ） |
| Hommataga Station | 本俣賀駅（ほんまたが） |
| Hommokufutō Station | 本牧埠頭駅（ほんもくふとう） |
| Hōnanchō Station | 方南町駅（ほうなんちょう） |
| Hon-Atsugi Station | 本厚木駅（ほんあつぎ） |
| Hon-Isahaya Station | 本諫早駅（ほんいさはや） |
| Hon-Ishikura Station | 本石倉駅（ほんいしくら） |
| Honai Station | 保内駅（ほない） |
| Hon-Chiba Station | 本千葉駅（ほんちば） |
| Honda Station | 誉田駅（ほんだ） |
| Hondōri Station (Astram Line) | 本通駅 (アストラムライン)（ほんどおり） |
| Hondōri Station (Hiroden) | 本通停留場（ほんどおり） |
| Hongō Station (Aichi) | 本郷駅 (愛知県)（ほんごう） |
| Hongō Station (Fukuoka) | 本郷駅 (福岡県)（ほんごう） |
| Hongō Station (Hiroshima) | 本郷駅 (広島県)（ほんごう） |
| Hongō Station (Nagano) | 本郷駅 (長野県)（ほんごう） |
| Hongōdai Station | 本郷台駅（ほんごうだい） |
| Hongō-Sanchōme Station | 本郷三丁目駅（ほんごうさんちょうめ） |
| Hongū Station | 本宮駅 (富山県)（ほんぐう） |
| Hon-Hachinohe Station | 本八戸駅（ほんはちのへ） |
| Honjin Station | 本陣駅（ほんじん） |
| Honjo-Azumabashi Station | 本所吾妻橋駅（ほんじょあずまばし） |
| Honjō Station (Saitama) | 本庄駅（ほんじょう） |
| Honjō Station (Fukuoka) | 本城駅（ほんじょう） |
| Honjō Station (Fukui) | 本荘駅（ほんじょう） |
| Honjō-Waseda Station | 本庄早稲田駅（ほんじょうわせだ） |
| Honkawachi Station | 本川内駅（ほんかわち） |
| Honkawa-cho Station | 本川町駅（ほんかわちょう） |
| Hon-Kawagoe Station | 本川越駅（ほんかわごえ） |
| Honkiri Station | 本桐駅（ほんきり） |
| Hon-Komagome Station | 本駒込駅（ほんこまごめ） |
| Hon-Kugenuma Station | 本鵠沼駅（ほんくげぬま） |
| Hon-Kuroda Station | 本黒田駅（ほんくろだ） |
| Hon-Mutabe Station | 本牟田部駅（ほんむたべ） |
| Honna Station | 本名駅（ほんな） |
| Hon-Nagashino Station | 本長篠駅（ほんながしの） |
| Hon-Nakano Station | 本中野駅（ほんなかの） |
| Honnō Station | 本納駅（ほんのう） |
| Hon-Shiogama Station | 本塩釜駅（ほんしおがま） |
| Hon-Tatsuno Station | 本竜野駅（ほんたつの） |
| Hon-Tsubata Station | 本津幡駅（ほんつばた） |
| Hon-Yoshiwara Station | 本吉原駅（ほんよしわら） |
| Hon-Yura Station | 本由良駅（ほんゆら） |
| Hōrai Station | 蓬莱駅（ほうらい） |
| Hōraioka Station | ほうらい丘駅（ほうらいおか） |
| Horei Station | 甫嶺駅（ほれい） |
| Horie Station | 堀江駅（ほりえ） |
| Horigome Station | 堀米駅（ほりごめ） |
| Horikawa Station | 堀川駅（ほりかわ） |
| Horikawa-Koizumi Station | 堀川小泉駅（ほりかわこいずみ） |
| Horikiri Station | 堀切駅（ほりきり） |
| Horikiri-Shōbuen Station | 堀切菖蒲園駅（ほりきりしょうぶえん） |
| Horinai Station | 堀内駅（ほりない） |
| Horinouchi Station | 堀ノ内駅（ほりのうち） |
| Horita Station (Nagoya Municipal Subway) | 堀田駅 (名古屋市営地下鉄)（ほりた） |
| Horita Station (Meitetsu) | 堀田駅 (名鉄)（ほりた） |
| Horiuchi-Kōen Station | 堀内公園駅（ほりうちこうえん） |
| Horobetsu Station | 幌別駅（ほろべつ） |
| Horohirabashi Station | 幌平橋駅（ほろひらばし） |
| Horomui Station | 幌向駅（ほろむい） |
| Horonobe Station | 幌延駅（ほろのべ） |
| Horonuka Station | 幌糠駅（ほろぬか） |
| Hōryūji Station | 法隆寺駅（ほうりゅうじ） |
| Hōshakuji Station | 宝積寺駅（ほうしゃくじ） |
| Hoshida Station | 星田駅（ほしだ） |
| Hoshigaoka Station (Aichi) | 星ヶ丘駅 (愛知県)（ほしがおか） |
| Hoshigaoka Station (Osaka) | 星ヶ丘駅 (大阪府)（ほしがおか） |
| Hoshii Station | 糒駅（ほしい） |
| Hoshikawa Station (Kanagawa) | 星川駅 (神奈川県)（ほしかわ） |
| Hoshikawa Station (Mie) | 星川駅 (三重県)（ほしかわ） |
| Hoshimi Station | ほしみ駅（ほしみ） |
| Hoshino Station | 星の駅（ほしの） |
| Hoshioki Station | 星置駅（ほしおき） |
| Hoshiya Station | 布施屋駅（ほしや） |
| Hōshuyama Station | 宝珠山駅（ほうしゅやま） |
| Hosobata Station | 細畑駅（ほそばた） |
| Hosokura Mine Park Mae Station | 細倉マインパーク前駅（ほそくらまいんぱーくまえ） |
| Hosono Station | 細野駅（ほその） |
| Hōsono Station | 祝園駅（ほうその） |
| Hosooka Station | 細岡駅（ほそおか） |
| Hosorogi Station | 細呂木駅（ほそろぎ） |
| Hosoura Station | 細浦駅（ほそうら） |
| Hosoya Station (Gunma) | 細谷駅 (群馬県)（ほそや） |
| Hosoya Station (Shizuoka) | 細谷駅 (静岡県)（ほそや） |
| Hossaka Station | 発坂駅（ほっさか） |
| Hōsui-Susukino Station | 豊水すすきの駅（ほうすいすすきの） |
| Hota Station (Chiba) | 保田駅 (千葉県)（ほた） |
| Hota Station (Fukui) | 保田駅 (福井県)（ほた） |
| Hotaka Station | 穂高駅（ほたか） |
| Hotaruda Station | 螢田駅（ほたるだ） |
| Hotarugaike Station | 蛍池駅（ほたるがいけ） |
| Hotei Station | 布袋駅（ほてい） |
| Hottoyuda Station | ほっとゆだ駅 |
| Hōya Station | 保谷駅（ほうや） |
| Hōzanji Station | 宝山寺駅（ほうざんじ） |
| Hōzenji Station | 法善寺駅（ほうぜんじ） |
| Hozue Station | 上枝駅（ほずえ） |
| Hozukyō Station | 保津峡駅（ほづきょう） |
| Hozumi Station | 穂積駅（ほづみ） |

=== Hu - Hy ===
| Huis Ten Bosch Station | ハウステンボス駅 |
| Hyōgo Station | 兵庫駅（ひょうご） |
| Hyōkiyama Station | 表木山駅（ひょうきやま） |
| Hyōtanyama Station (Aichi) | 瓢箪山駅 (愛知県)（ひょうたんやま） |
| Hyōtanyama Station (Osaka) | 瓢箪山駅 (大阪府)（ひょうたんやま） |
| Hyūga Station | 日向駅（ひゅうが） |
| Hyūga-Kitakata Station | 日向北方駅（ひゅうがきたかた） |
| Hyūga-Kutsukake Station | 日向沓掛駅（ひゅうがくつかけ） |
| Hyūga-Maeda Station | 日向前田駅（ひゅうがまえだ） |
| Hyūga-Nagai Station | 日向長井駅（ひゅうがながい） |
| Hyūga-Ōtsuka Station | 日向大束駅（ひゅうがおおつか） |
| Hyūgashi Station | 日向市駅（ひゅうがし） |
| Hyūga-Shintomi Station | 日向新富駅（ひゅうがしんとみ） |
| Hyūga-Shōnai Station | 日向庄内駅（ひゅうがしょうない） |
| Hyūga-Sumiyoshi Station | 日向住吉駅（ひゅうがすみよし） |
