= Shinhidaka, Hokkaido =

Shinhidaka 新ひだか町
- Town
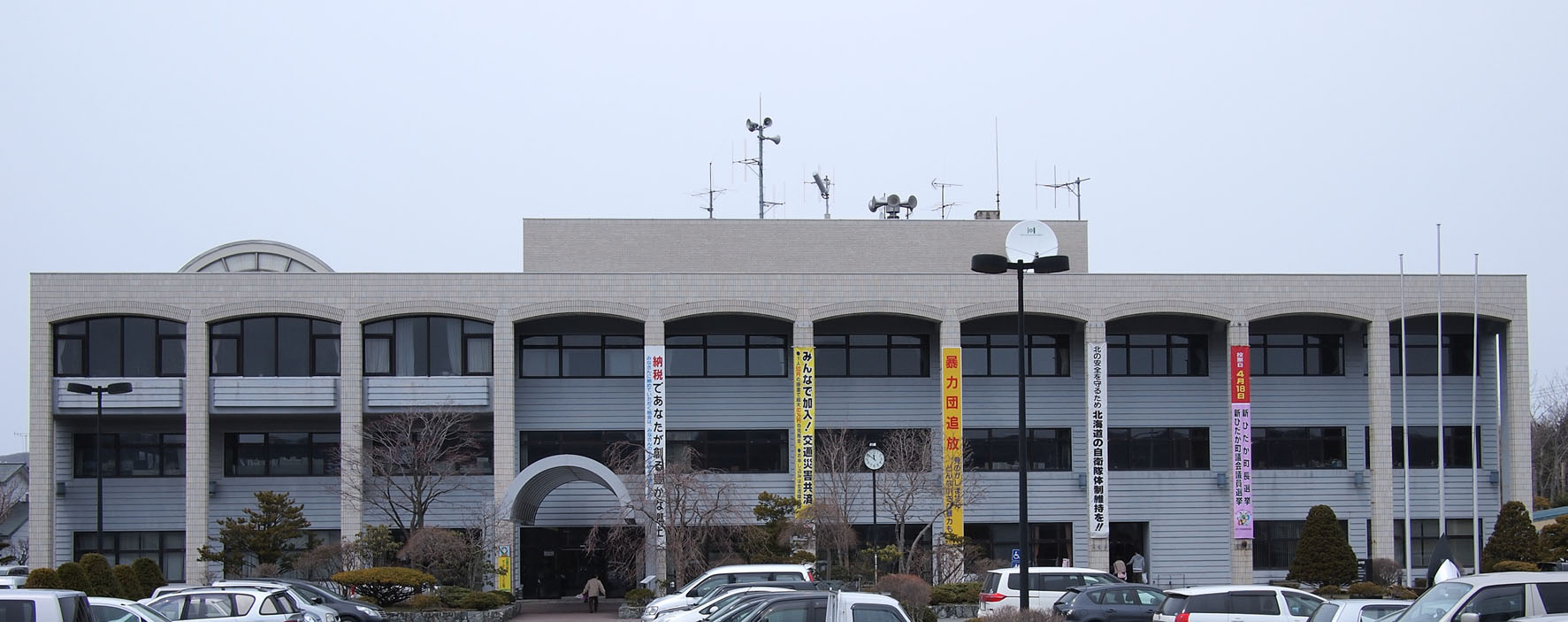
- Shinhidaka Town Hall

- Flag Seal

- Location of Shinhidaka in Hokkaido (Hidaka Subprefecture)
- Interactive map of Shinhidaka
- Coordinates: 42°20′29″N 142°22′07″E
- Country: Japan
- Region: Hokkaido
- Prefecture: Hokkaido (Hidaka Subprefecture)
- District: Hidaka

Government
  - Mayor: Yoshihide Sakai

Area
  - Total: 1,147.55 km^{2} (443.07 sq mi)

Population (December 31, 2025)
  - Total: 19,785
  - Density: 17.241/km^{2} (44.654/sq mi)
- Time zone: UTC+09:00 (JST)
- City hall address: 3-2-50, Shizunai Miyukichō, Shinhidaka-chō, Hidaka-gun, Hokkaidō 056-8650
- Climate: Dfb
- Website: www.shinhidaka-hokkaido.jp
- Symbols
- Flower: Ezoyamatsutsuji (Rhododendron kaempferi) and beach rose (Rosa rugosa)
- Mascot: Konbuman (こんぶマン) and Kobune-chan (こぶねちゃん)
- Tree: Ezoyamazakura and Japanese ash

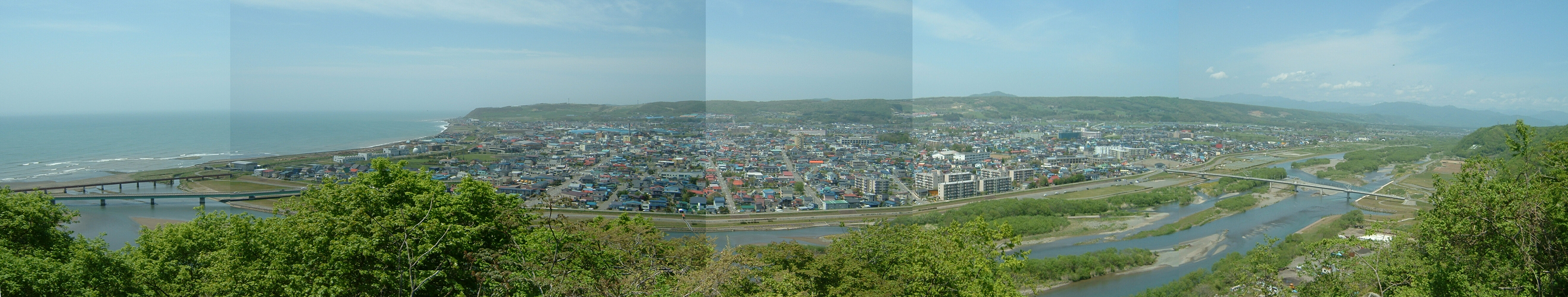
Panorama of Shizunai

Shinhidaka (新ひだか町, Shinhidaka-chō) is a town located in Hidaka Subprefecture, Hokkaidō, Japan. As of 31 December 2025, the town had an estimated population of 19,785 in 1120 households, and a population density of 17 people per km^{2}. The total area of the town is 1,147.55 km^{2} (443.07 sq mi). Although Urakawa is the capital of Hidaka Subprefecture, Shinhidaka is the most populous town and the economic center of the subprefecture.

== Geography ==
Shinhidaka is located in southern Hokkaido, in the central coastal area of the Hidaka Subprefecture. The southwestern part faces the Pacific Ocean, and the mountainous area originating from the Hidaka Mountains in the northeastern part is designated as the Hidakasanmyaku-Erimo-Tokachi National Park. The southern part faces the Pacific Ocean. The urban area spreads out at the mouth of the Shizunai River. Its highest location is Mount Kamuiekuuchikaushi (42°37′30″N 142°45′58″E) at 1,979.4 m (6,494 ft). Takami Dam, Hokkaido's largest dam, is located in Shinhidaka.

=== Neighboring municipalities ===
- Niikappu
- Urakawa
- Taiki
- Nakasatsunai

=== Climate ===
Shinhidaka has a humid continental climate (Köppen Dfb) with warm summers and cold winters. With an alternate definition, using the −3 °C (27 °F) isotherm, Shinhidaka falls in the rare oceanic climate (Cfb) of the east coast of the continents due to the warm current of Tsushima. Owing to its slightly more southerly latitude, easterly aspect, and location on the sea, snowfall is much lighter than in the major cities of western Hokkaido, like Sapporo, Hakodate, Asahikawa, and Wakkanai. Precipitation is heaviest in the summer months when remnant typhoons may approach. Year-round sunshine, although less than in the Tokachi Plain, is also higher than in western Hokkaido

Climate data for Mitsuishi, Shinhidaka (1991−2020 normals, extremes 1977−present)
Month	Jan	Feb	Mar	Apr	May	Jun	Jul	Aug	Sep	Oct	Nov	Dec	Year
Record high °C (°F)	10.7 (51.3)	10.5 (50.9)	17.3 (63.1)	22.6 (72.7)	25.8 (78.4)	28.4 (83.1)	32.1 (89.8)	33.4 (92.1)	31.2 (88.2)	23.5 (74.3)	19.9 (67.8)	14.3 (57.7)	33.4 (92.1)
Mean daily maximum °C (°F)	0.4 (32.7)	0.8 (33.4)	4.5 (40.1)	10.3 (50.5)	15.4 (59.7)	18.8 (65.8)	22.4 (72.3)	24.3 (75.7)	22.0 (71.6)	16.3 (61.3)	9.5 (49.1)	2.9 (37.2)	12.3 (54.1)
Daily mean °C (°F)	−4.6 (23.7)	−4.2 (24.4)	−0.2 (31.6)	4.7 (40.5)	10.0 (50.0)	14.2 (57.6)	18.4 (65.1)	20.0 (68.0)	16.6 (61.9)	10.1 (50.2)	4.2 (39.6)	−1.8 (28.8)	7.3 (45.1)
Mean daily minimum °C (°F)	−11.3 (11.7)	−11.2 (11.8)	−6.1 (21.0)	−1.8 (28.8)	3.7 (38.7)	9.4 (48.9)	14.8 (58.6)	16.0 (60.8)	11.0 (51.8)	3.5 (38.3)	−1.7 (28.9)	−7.5 (18.5)	1.6 (34.8)
Record low °C (°F)	−24.1 (−11.4)	−25.9 (−14.6)	−23.6 (−10.5)	−11.6 (11.1)	−5.9 (21.4)	−0.4 (31.3)	5.4 (41.7)	5.0 (41.0)	−0.8 (30.6)	−5.7 (21.7)	−12.5 (9.5)	−20.8 (−5.4)	−25.9 (−14.6)
Average precipitation mm (inches)	38.4 (1.51)	35.7 (1.41)	62.7 (2.47)	98.7 (3.89)	146.3 (5.76)	105.5 (4.15)	158.7 (6.25)	182.4 (7.18)	152.3 (6.00)	127.2 (5.01)	94.2 (3.71)	59.6 (2.35)	1,258.4 (49.54)
Average rainy days (≥ 1.0 mm)	7.4	7.2	8.1	10.8	11.0	9.0	11.3	11.5	11.3	11.9	12.6	11.1	123.2
Mean monthly sunshine hours	145.6	155.3	185.5	188.6	193.8	161.9	126.9	143.9	165.7	171.6	126.3	120.9	1,886.7
Source 1: JMA
Source 2: JMA

=== Demographics ===
Per Japanese census data, the population of Shinhidaka has declined in recent decades.

Historical population

Year	Pop.	±%
1920	12,583	—
1925	13,680	+8.7%
1930	17,174	+25.5%
1935	19,410	+13.0%
1940	19,412	+0.0%
1945	24,022	+23.7%
1950	26,570	+10.6%
1955	30,123	+13.4%
1960	32,746	+8.7%
1965	35,754	+9.2%
1970	33,241	−7.0%

Year	Pop.	±%
1975	32,257	−3.0%
1980	33,190	+2.9%
1985	32,610	−1.7%
1990	30,262	−7.2%
1995	29,337	−3.1%
2000	28,438	−3.1%
2005	27,265	−4.1%
2010	25,420	−6.8%
2015	23,231	−8.6%
2020	21,517	−7.4%

Shinhidaka population statistics

== History ==
The river valleys of what is now Shinhidaka were occupied by the Ainu. From the 19th century, people from Japan began to settle in the region.

On March 31, 2006, the town of Mitsuishi merged with the town of Shizunai to create the new town of Shinhidaka.

== Government ==
Shinhidaka has a mayor-council form of government with a directly elected mayor and a unicameral town council of 16 members. Shinhidaka, as part of Hidaka Subprefecture, contributes two members to the Hokkaidō Prefectural Assembly. In terms of national politics, the town is part of the Hokkaidō 9th district of the lower house of the Diet of Japan.

== Economy ==
The main industries are dairy farming and fishing (kelp), as well as the breeding and production of racehorses, fishing, forestry, rice farming, field crops, and livestock farming.

== Education ==
Shinhidaka has four public elementary schools and three public middle schools operated by the town. The town has two public high schools and one special education school for the handicapped operated by the Hokkaido Board of Education. The town also has one vocational training school for nursing.

== Transportation ==
=== Railways ===
Shinhidaka was served by the JR Hokkaido Hidaka Main Line. However, no trains have operated between Mukawa and Samani since January 2015, due to storm damage. Plans to restore this section of the line have been abandoned, due to declining passenger numbers and very high maintenance costs, and the section was officially closed on 1 April 2021, and replaced by a bus service.

Defunct railway stations in Shinhidaka: Shizunai - Higashi-Shizunai - Harutachi - Hidaka-Tōbetsu - Hidaka-Mitsuishi - Hōei - Honkiri

=== Highways ===
- Hidaka Expressway
- National Route 235

== Sister cities ==
- Lexington, Kentucky (United States)
- Minamiawaji, Hyōgo Prefecture (Japan)
- Mima, Tokushima Prefecture (Japan)
- Sumoto, Hyōgo Prefecture (Japan)

== Local attractions ==
- Nijikken-dōro (二十間道路), literally, road 20 ken (36 metres (118 ft)) in width, is an avenue lined with Ezo mountain cherry Prunus sargentii, (エゾヤマザクラ, Ezo-yamazakura) trees and a major tourist attraction of the town. The 8 kilometres (5.0 mi) road was created for a visit of the Imperial Family to the nearby Niikappu horse ranch in 1903. The ranch is under the jurisdiction of the Imperial Household Agency. It took five years to transplant trees from the local mountains to create the avenue. It was finished in 1916. Shinhidaka holds a cherry blossom festival yearly in May at the road in Shizunai ward.
- Chasi Ruins in the Shibechari River Basin and Appetsu Chasi Ruins, National Historic Site
- Shizunai Gotenyama Tombs - Designated by Hokkaido Cultural Property
- Shizunai Local Museum
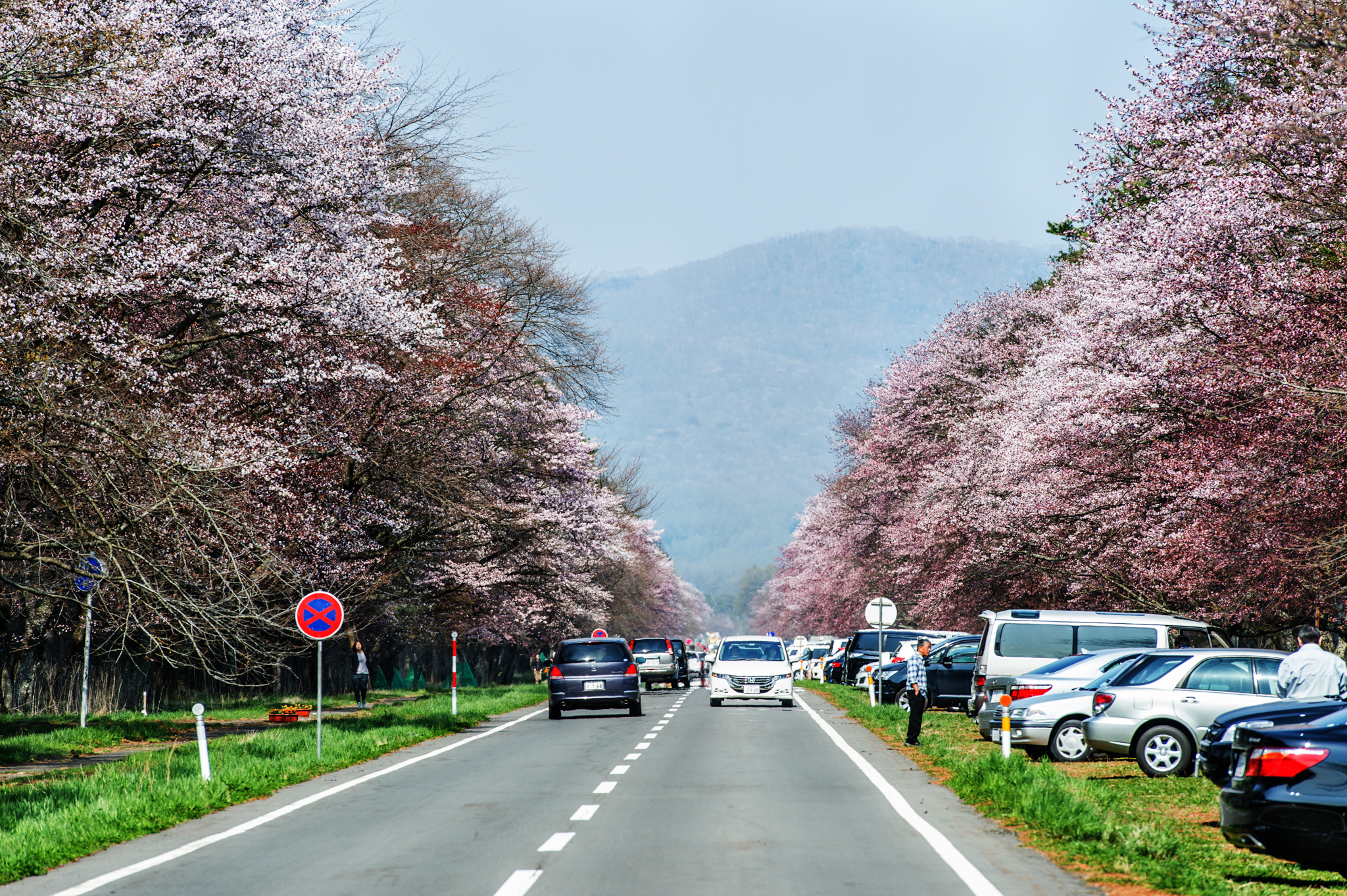
Nijikken-dōro

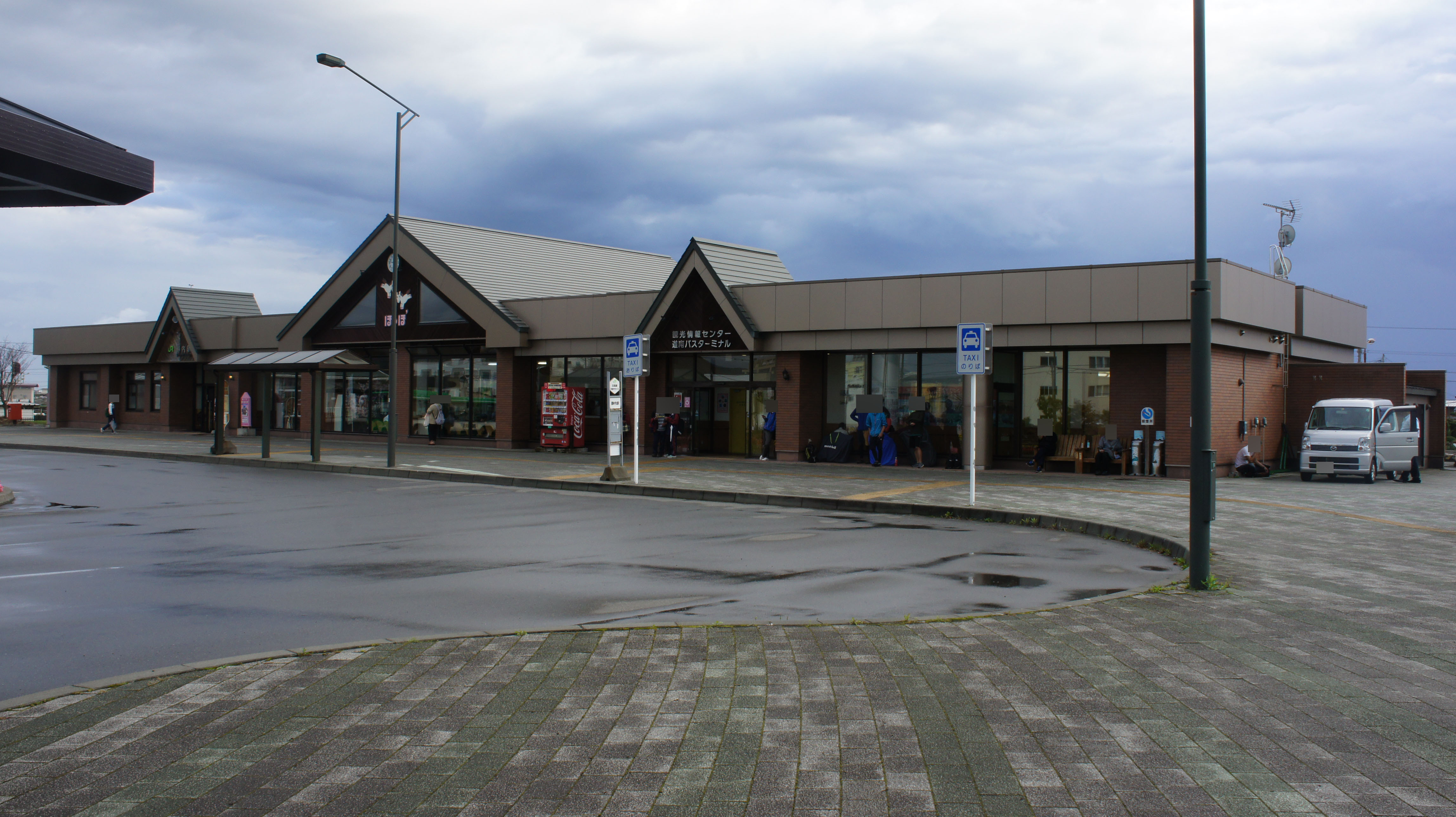
former Shizunai Station

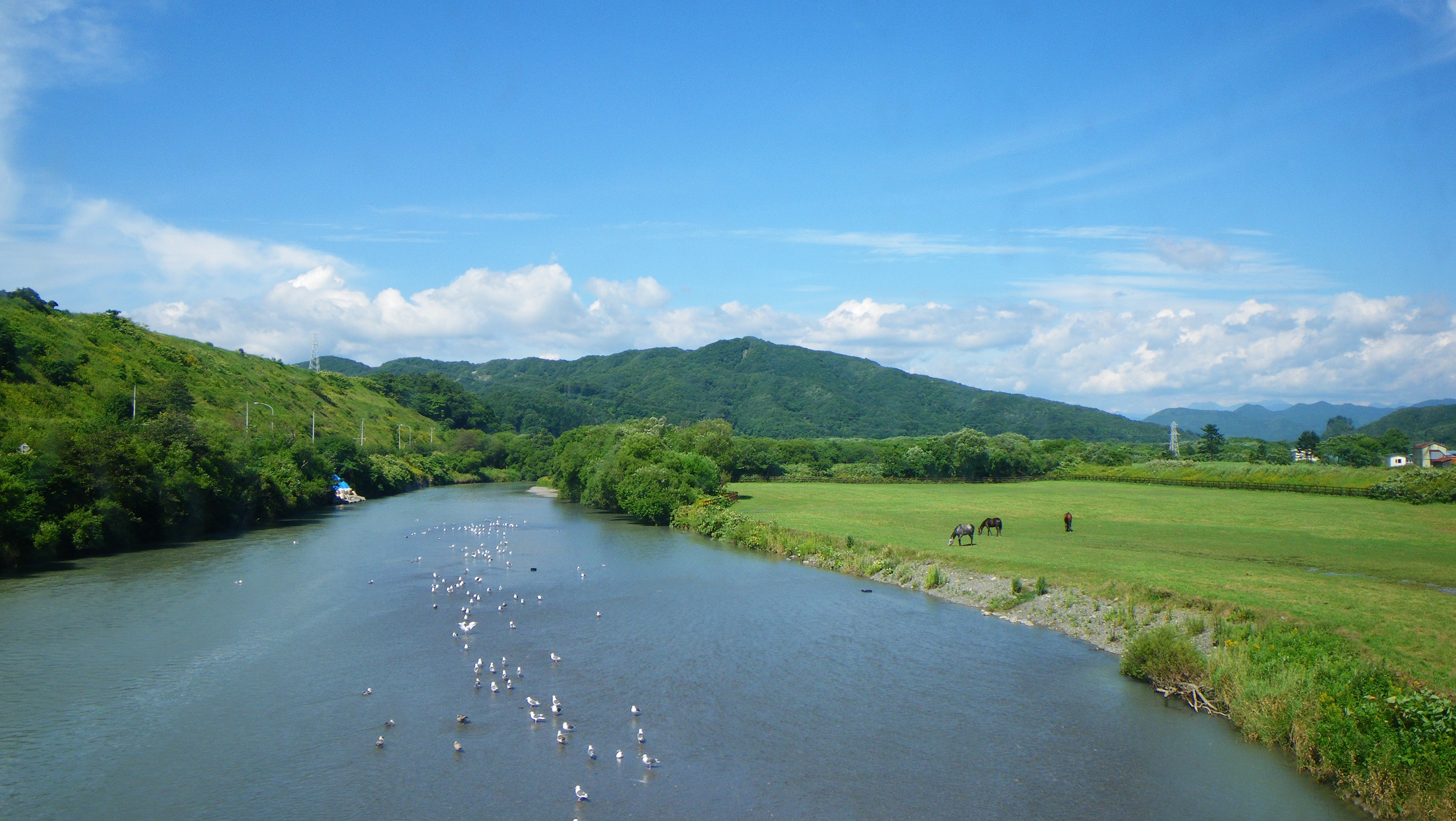
Mitsuishi River

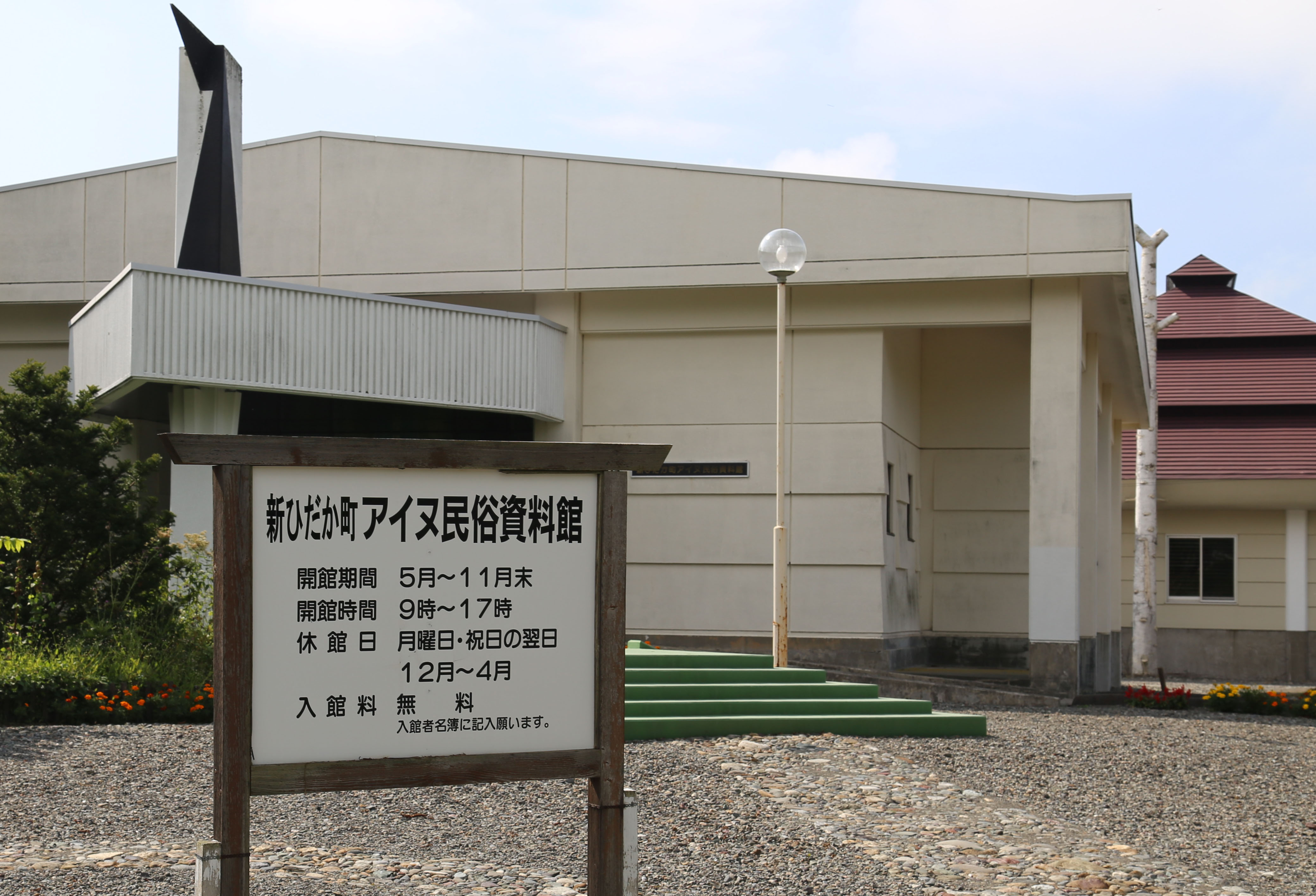
Shinhidaka Ainu Museum

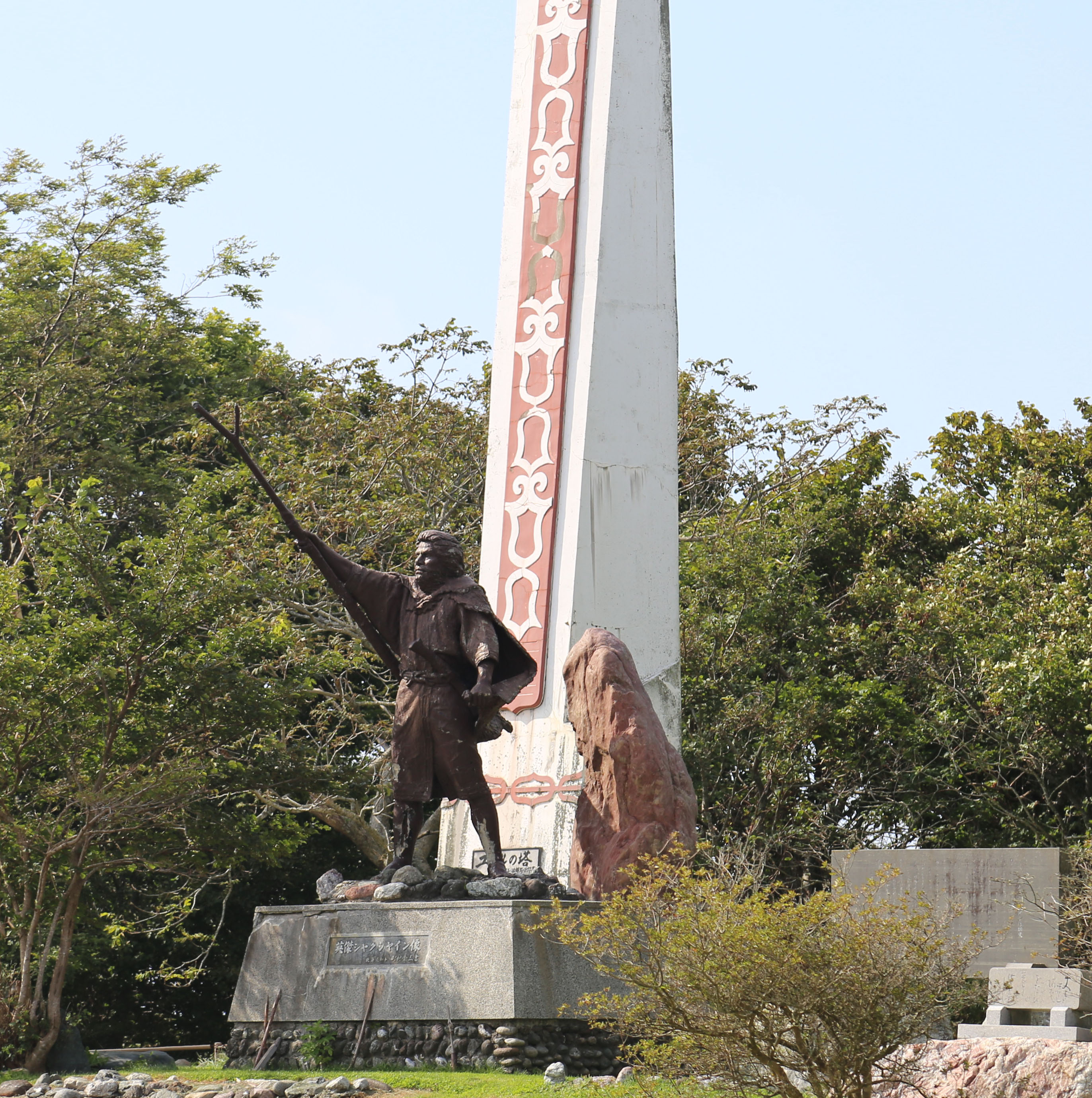
Monument to Shakushain's revolt

=== Mascots ===
Konbuman and Kobune-chan, the town's mascots

Shinhidaka's mascots are Konbuman (こんぶマン) and Kobune-chan (こぶねちゃん). They are superhero siblings.

- Kobuman is from Mitsuishi. He is usually active in events. He became mascot on February 2, 2013.
- Kobune-chan became mascot on August 10, 2017. Like her brother, she is also usually active in events.
