= Hitotsugi Station =

Railway station in Kariya, Aichi Prefecture, Japan

Hitotsugi Station 一ツ木駅

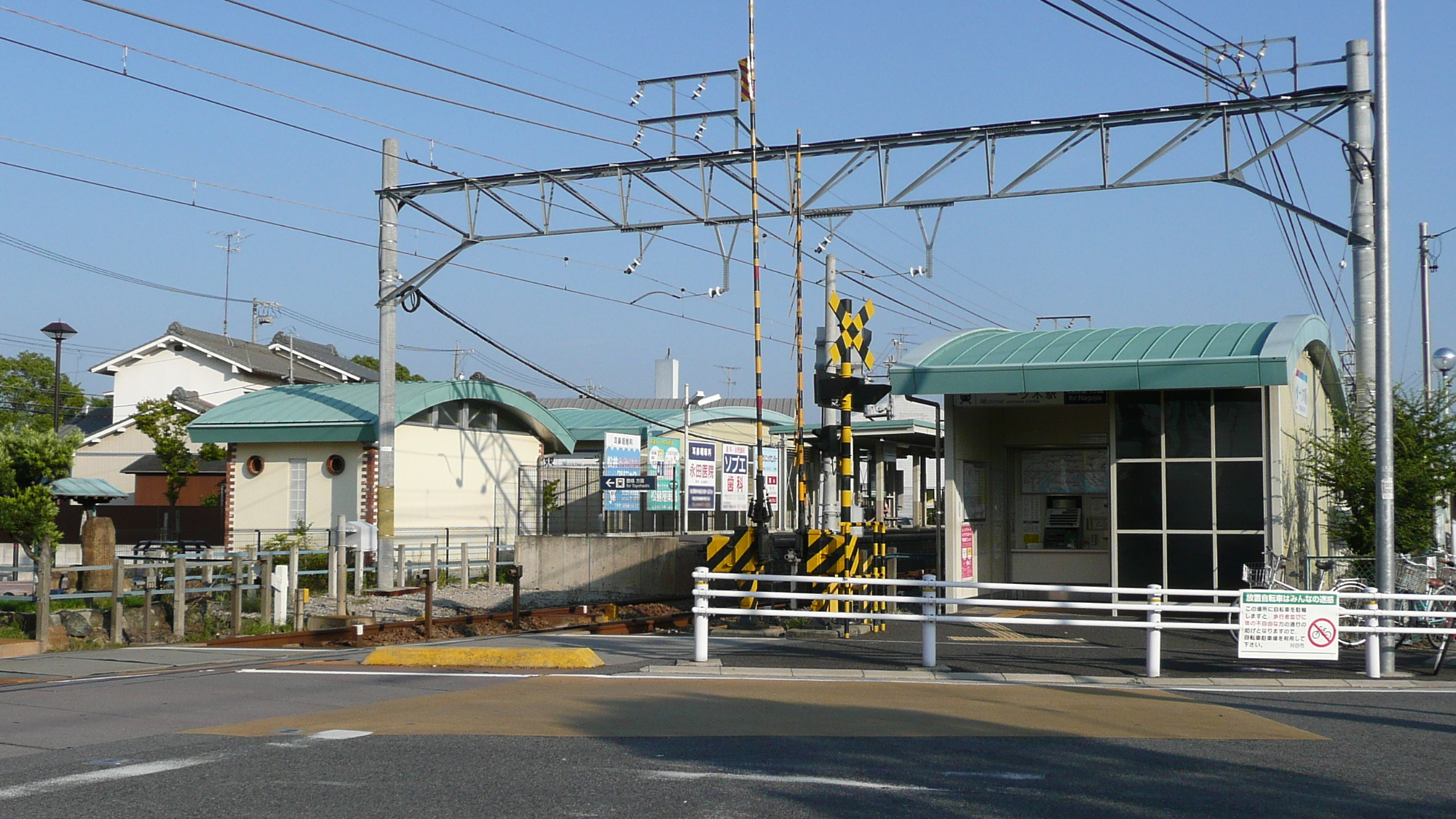
- Hitotsugi Station in September 2013

General information
- Location: 5-5-2 Hitotsugichō, Kariya-shi, Aichi-ken 448-0003; Japan
- Coordinates: 35.0138°N 137.0256°E
- Operator: Meitetsu
- Line: ■ Meitetsu Nagoya Main Line
- Distance: 44.6 kilometers from Toyohashi
- Platforms: 2 side platforms

Construction
- Structure type: At-grade

Other information
- Status: Unstaffed
- Station code: NH29
- Website: Official website

History
- Opened: 1 April 1923; 103 years ago

Passengers
- FY2017: 3432

Services
Preceding station	Meitetsu	Following station
Chiryu towards Toyohashi	Nagoya Main Line Local	Fujimatsu towards Meitetsu Gifu
Location
- Location within Aichi Prefecture Location within Japan

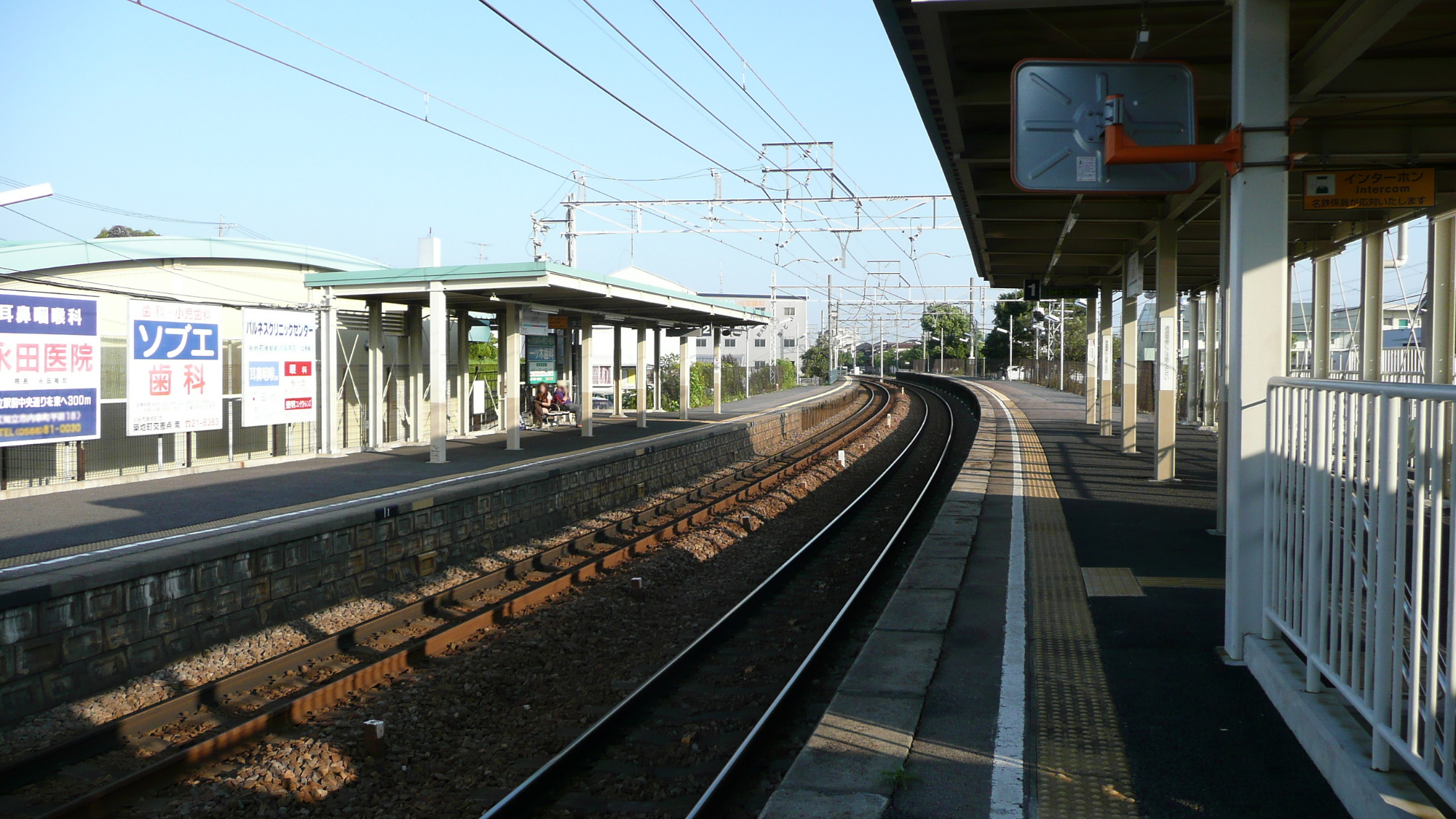
Platform

Hitotsugi Station (一ツ木駅, Hitotsugi-eki) is a railway station in the city of Kariya, Aichi Prefecture, Japan, operated by Meitetsu.

== Lines ==
Hitotsugi Station is served by the Meitetsu Nagoya Main Line, and is located 44.6 kilometers from the starting point of the line at Toyohashi.

== Station layout ==
The station has two opposed side platforms connected by a level crossing. The station has automatic turnstiles for the Tranpass system of magnetic fare cards, and is unattended.

=== Platforms ===
1	■ Nagoya Main Line	For Meitetsu Nagoya, Meitetsu Gifu and Inuyama
2	■ Nagoya Main Line	For Higashi Okazaki and Toyohashi

== Station history ==
Hitotsugi Station was opened on 1 April 1923 as a station on the Aichi Electric Railway. On 1 April 1935, the Aichi Electric Railway merged with the Nagoya Railroad (the forerunner of present-day Meitetsu).

== Passenger statistics ==
In fiscal 2017, the station was used by an average of 3432 passengers daily.

== Surrounding area ==
- Japan National Route 23
- Japan National Route 1
- Karigane Elementary School

== See also ==
- List of railway stations in Japan
