= Harukiba Station =

Railway station in Shizukuishi, Iwate Prefecture, Japan

Harukiba Station 春木場駅
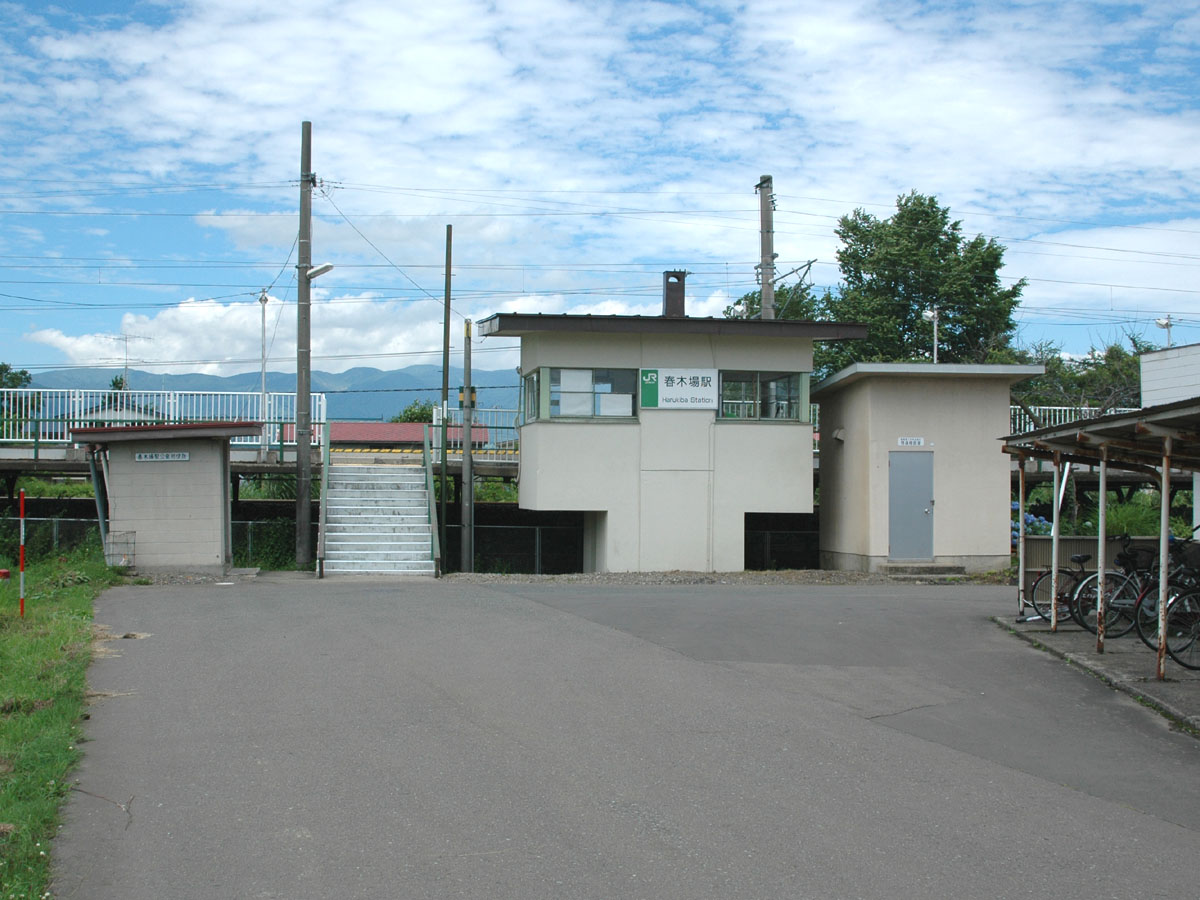
- Harukiba Station in 2007

General information
- Location: Ueno Kannon-do, Shizukuishi-cho, Iwate-gun, Iwate-ken 020-0583; Japan
- Coordinates: 39.6936°N 140.9439°E
- Operator: JR East
- Line: ■ Tazawako Line
- Distance: 18.7 km from Morioka
- Platforms: 1 side platform
- Tracks: 1

Construction
- Structure type: At grade

Other information
- Status: Unstaffed
- Website: Official website

History
- Opened: September 10, 1964

Services
Preceding station	JR East	Following station
Akabuchi towards Ōmagari	Tazawako Line	Shizukuishi towards Morioka
Location
- Location within Japan

Harukiba Station (春木場駅, Harukiba-eki) is an East Japan Railway Company (JR East) railway station located in the town of Shizukuishi, Iwate Prefecture, Japan.

== History ==
Harukiba Station opened on September 10, 1964. The station was absorbed into the JR East network upon the privatization of the JNR on April 1, 1987.

== Lines ==
Harukiba Station is served by the Tazawako Line, and is located 18.7 km from the terminus of the line at Morioka Station.

== Station layout ==
Harukiba Station has a single side platform serving a single bi-directional track. There is no station building, but only a weather shelter on the platform itself. The station is unattended.

== Surrounding area ==
- National Route 46
- Omyojin Post Office

== See also ==
- List of railway stations in Japan
