= Harumachi Station =

Railway station in Kasuya, Fukuoka Prefecture, Japan

JC 03 Harumachi Station 原町駅
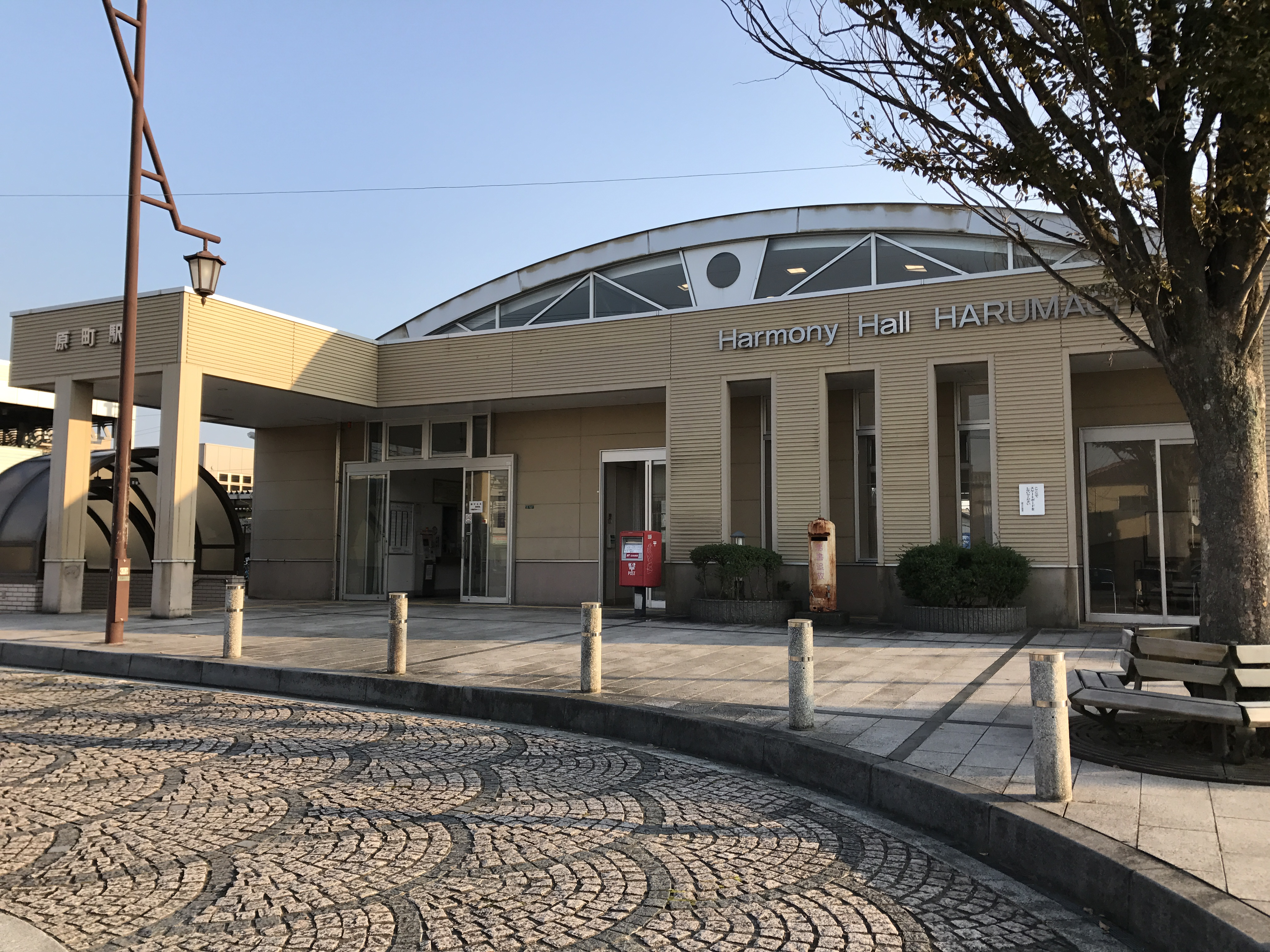
- Harumachi Station in 2016

General information
- Location: 1-1-1 Haramachi, Kasuya-machi, Kasuya-gun, Fukuoka-ken 811-2307; Japan
- Coordinates: 33°36′42″N 130°28′15″E
- Operator: JR Kyushu
- Line: JC Sasaguri Line
- Distance: 5.0 km from Yoshizuka
- Platforms: 2 side platforms
- Tracks: 2

Construction
- Structure type: At grade
- Cycle facilities: Bike shed

Other information
- Status: Staffed ticket window (outsourced)
- Website: Official website

History
- Opened: 19 June 1904

Passengers
- FY2020: 1215 daily
- Rank: 119th (among JR Kyushu stations)

Services
Preceding station	JR Kyushu	Following station
Yusu towards Hakata	Sasaguri Line Local	Chōjabaru towards Keisen
Location
- Location within Fukuoka Prefecture Location within Japan

Harumachi Station (原町駅, Harumachi-eki) is a passenger railway station located in the town of Kasuya, Fukuoka Prefecture, Japan. It is operated by JR Kyushu.

== Lines ==
The station is served by the Sasaguri Line and is located 5.0 km from the starting point of the line at Yoshizuka. The station is sometimes depicted on maps and timetables as part of the Fukuhoku Yutaka Line, of which the Sasaguri Line is a component.

== Station layout ==
The station consists of two side platforms serving two tracks. The station shares a building with a community facility named "Harmony Hall Harumachi". There is a small waiting area and a staffed ticket window. Access to the opposite side platform is by means of a covered footbridge.

Management of the station has been outsourced to the JR Kyushu Tetsudou Eigyou Co., a wholly owned subsidiary of JR Kyushu specialising in station services. It staffs the ticket window which is equipped with a POS machine but without a Midori no Madoguchi facility.

=== Platforms ===
1	■ JC Sasaguri Line	for Keisen and Iizuka
2	■ JC Sasaguri Line	for Yoshizuka and Hakata

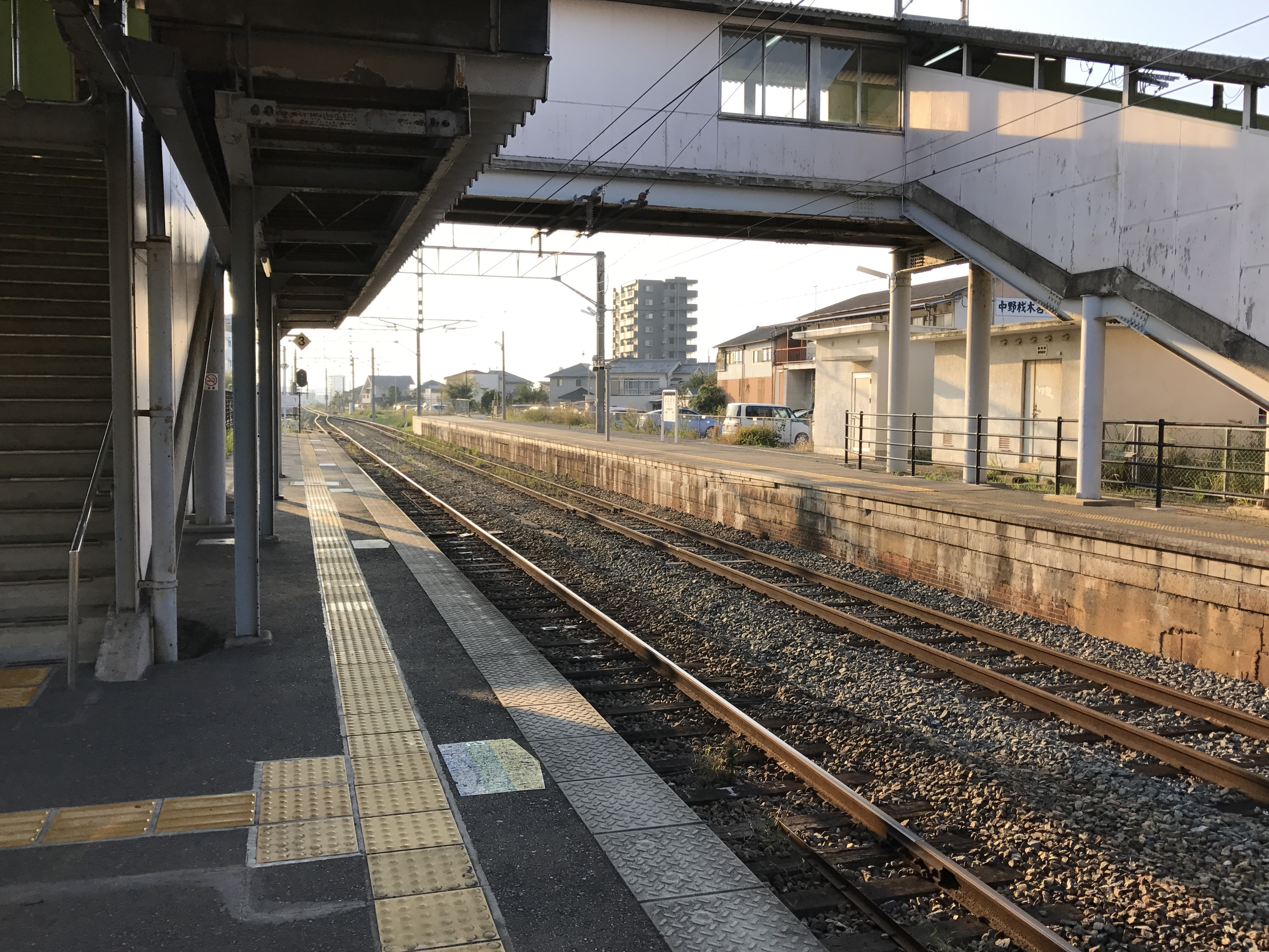
A view of the platforms and tracks. Note the covered footbrige.

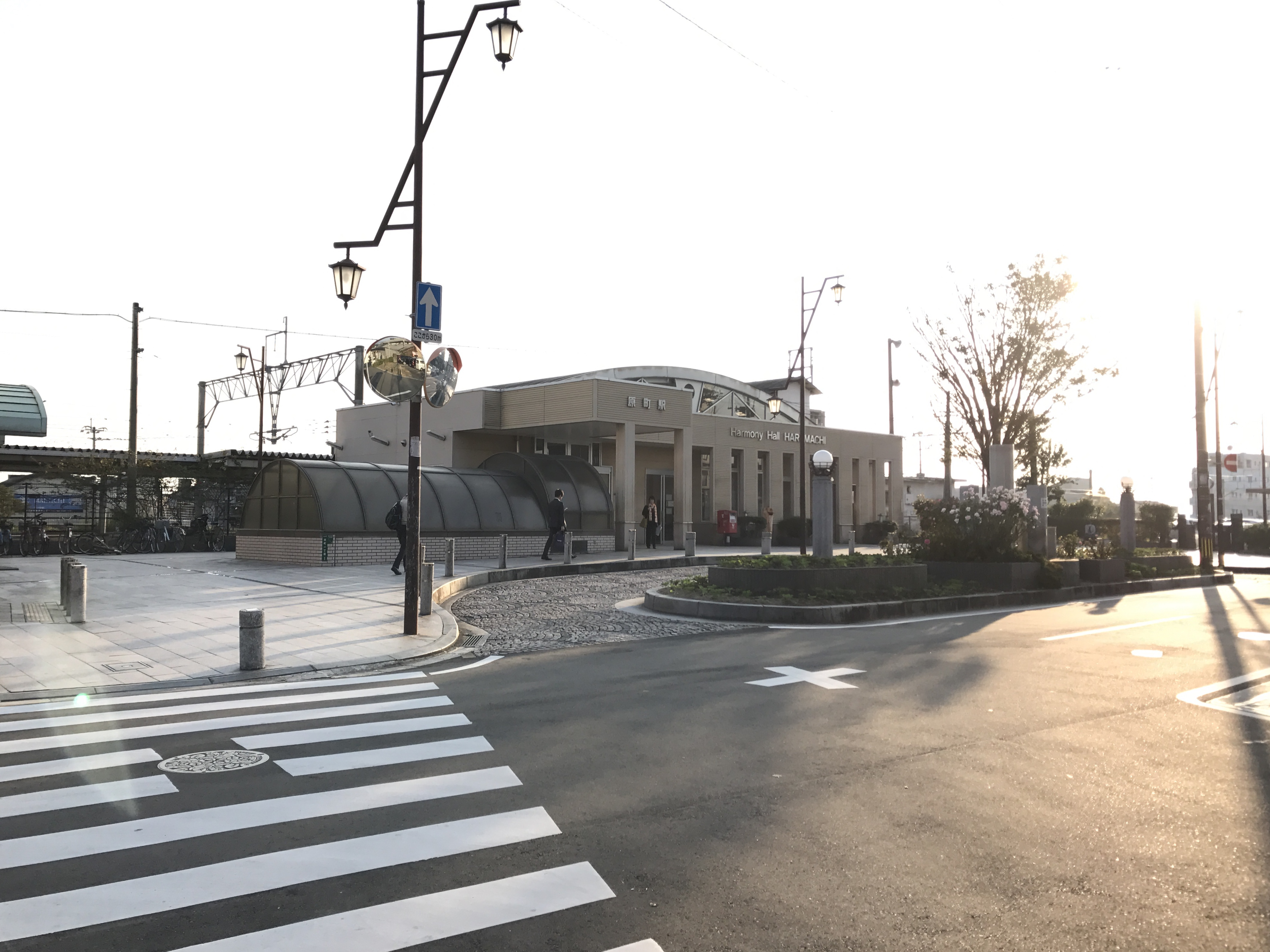
A distant view of the station building showing the bike shed to the left.

== History ==
The privately run Kyushu Railway opened a stretch of track from Yoshizuka to Sasaguri on 19 June 1904, with Harumachi opening on the same day as an intermediate station on the track. When the Kyushu Railway was nationalized on 1 July 1907, Japanese Government Railways (JGR) took over control of the station. On 12 October 1909, the station became part of the Sasaguri Line. With the privatization of Japanese National Railways (JNR), the successor of JGR, on 1 April 1987, JR Kyushu took over control of the station.

== Passenger statistics ==
In fiscal 2020, there was a daily average of 1215 boarding passengers at this station, making it the 119th busiest station on the JR Kyushu network.

== Surrounding area ==
- Kasuya Town Nakahara Elementary School

== See also ==
- List of railway stations in Japan
