= Hidaka-mitsuishi Station =

Railway station in Shinhidaka, Hokkaido, Japan

Coordinates: 42.2473°N 142.5670°E

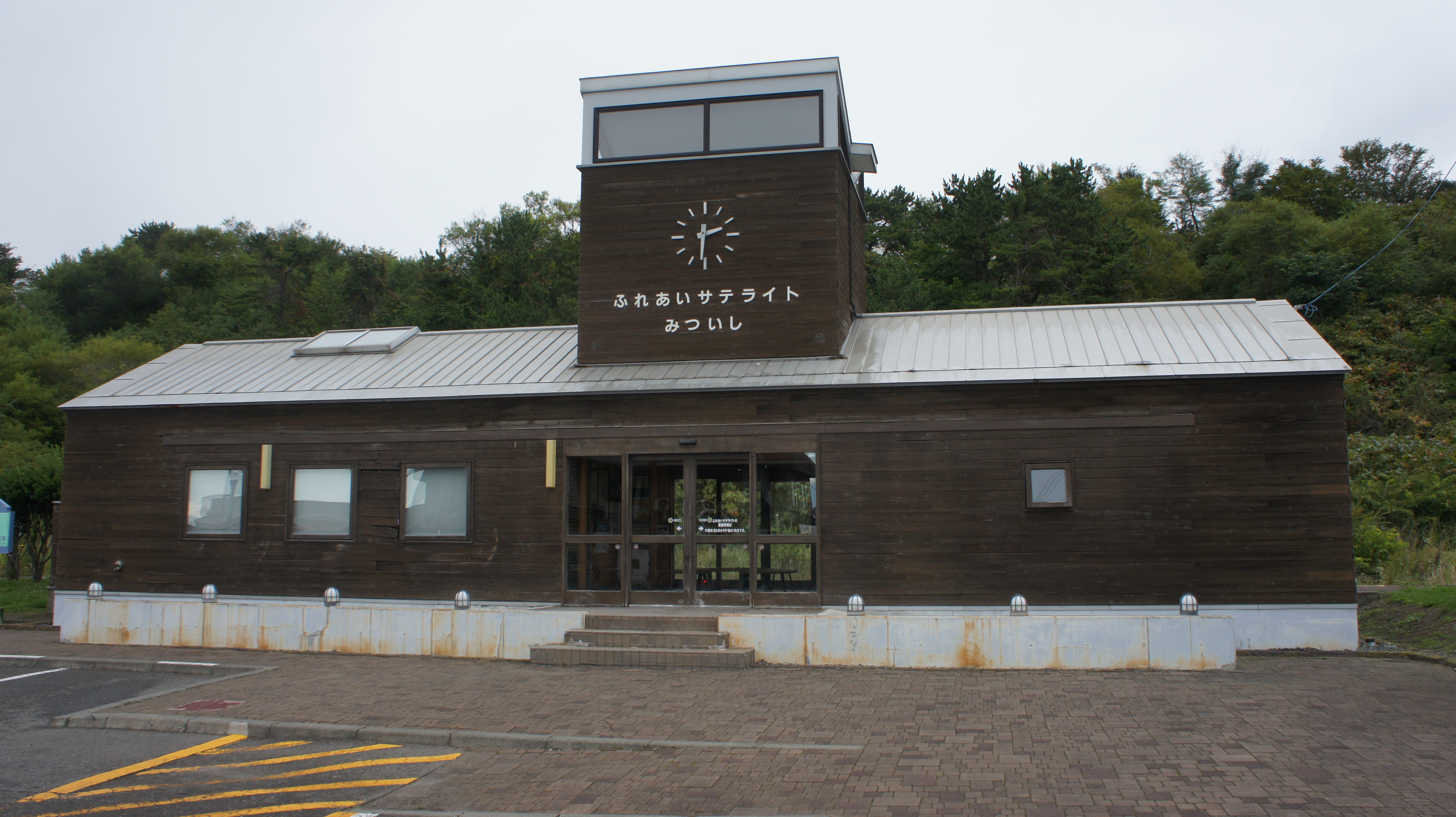
JR Hidaka-Main-Line Hidaka-Mitsuishi Station building

Hidaka-Mitsuishi Station (日高三石駅, Hidaka-Mitsuishi-eki) was a railway station on the Hidaka Main Line in Shinhidaka, Hokkaido, Japan, operated by the Hokkaido Railway Company (JR Hokkaido).

Services on the 116 km section of the line between Mukawa and Samani have been suspended indefinitely since January 2015 due to storm damage.

== Adjacent stations ==
«	Service	»
Hidaka Main Line
Hidaka-Tōbetsu	Local	Hōei

== History ==
The station opened on 15 December 1933. With the privatization of Japanese National Railways (JNR) on 1 April 1987, the station came under the control of JR Hokkaido.

== See also ==
- List of railway stations in Japan
