= Hōei Station =

Railway station in Shinhidaka, Hokkaido, Japan

Hōei Station 蓬栄駅

General information
- Location: Shinhidaka, Hokkaido, Japan; Japan
- Coordinates: 42°15′53″N 142°36′17″E
- System: railway station
- Owner: Hokkaido Railway Company (JR Hokkaido)
- Operator: Hokkaido Railway Company (JR Hokkaido)
- Line: Hidaka Main Line
- Distance: 109.8 km from Tomakomai (on the Hidaka Main Line)

Other information
- Status: Closed (formally closed 1 April 2021; services suspended indefinitely from January 2015 due to storm damage)

History
- Opened: 15 July 1958
- Closed: 1 April 2021
Location
Notes
- Services on the 116 km section of the line between Mukawa and Samani were suspended indefinitely from January 2015 due to storm damage and formally closed on 1 April 2021.

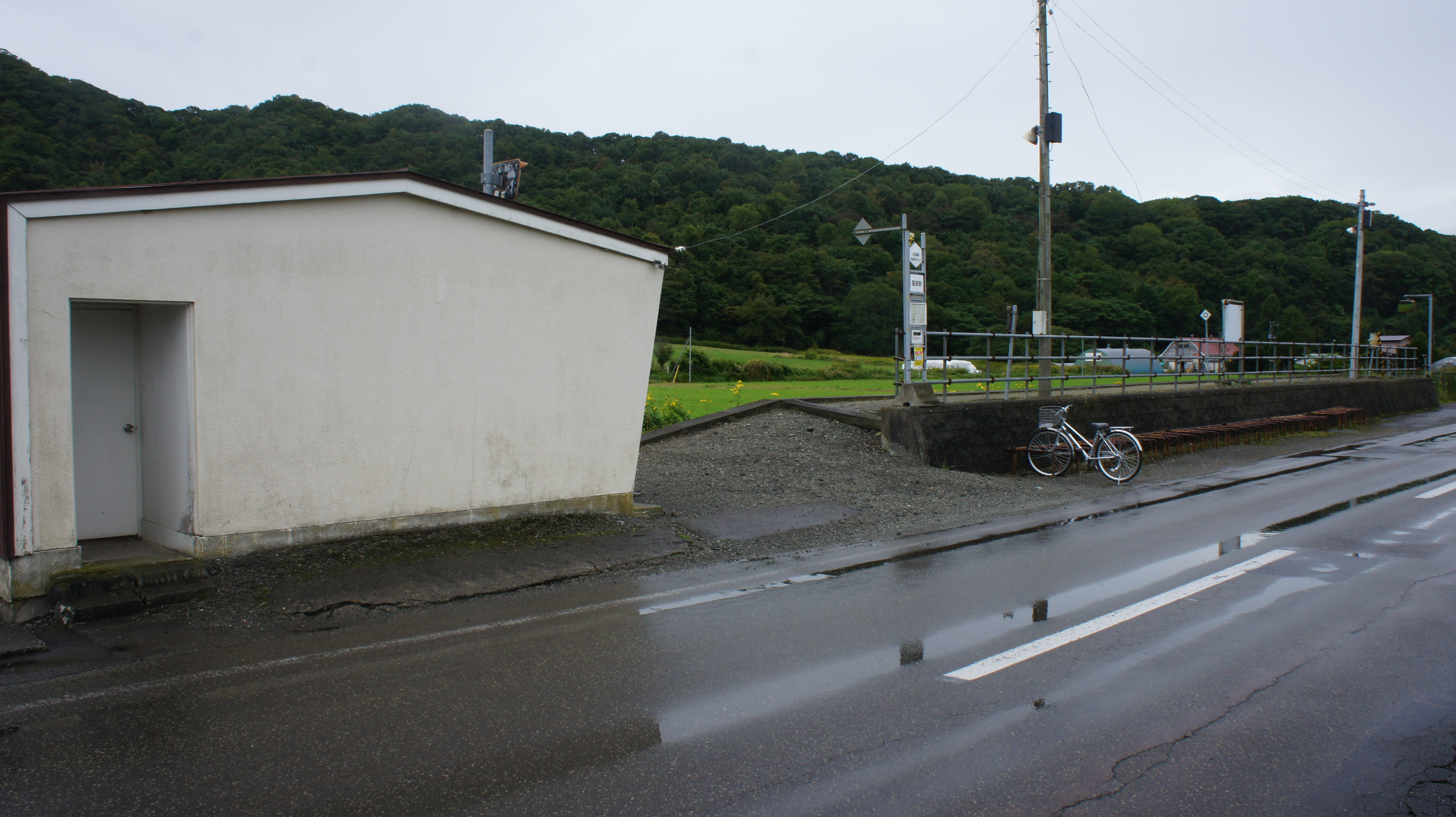
JR Hidaka-Main-Line Hoei Station Overall

Hōei Station (蓬栄駅, Hōei-eki) was a railway station on the Hidaka Main Line in Shinhidaka, Hokkaido, Japan, operated by the Hokkaido Railway Company (JR Hokkaido).

Services on the 116 km section of the line between Mukawa and Samani were suspended indefinitely from January 2015 due to storm damage.

== Adjacent stations ==
«	Service	»
Hidaka Main Line
Hidaka-Mitsuishi	Local	Honkiri

== History ==
The station opened on 15 July 1958. With the privatization of Japanese National Railways (JNR) on 1 April 1987, the station came under the control of JR Hokkaido.

== See also ==
- List of railway stations in Japan
