= List of railway stations in Japan: S =

List of railway stations in Japan

| A | B | C | D | E | F | G | H | I | J | KL | M | N | O | P | R | S | T | U | W | Y | Z |

This list shows the railway stations in Japan that begin with the letter S. This is a subset of the full list of railway stations in Japan.

== Station list ==
=== Sa ===
| Sabae Station | 鯖江駅（さばえ） |
| Sabaishi Station | 鯖石駅（さばいし） |
| Sabane Station | 佐羽根駅（さばね） |
| Sabase Station | 鯖瀬駅（さばせ） |
| Sachiura Station | 幸浦駅（さちうら） |
| Sadamitsu Station | 貞光駅（さだみつ） |
| Sadōri Station | 左通駅（さどおり） |
| Sadowara Station | 佐土原駅（さどわら） |
| Saeki-Kuyakushomae Station | 佐伯区役所前駅（さえきくやくしょまえ） |
| Saga Station | 佐賀駅（さが） |
| Saga-Arashiyama Station | 嵯峨嵐山駅（さがあらしやま） |
| Sagae Station | 寒河江駅（さがえ） |
| Saga-Kōen Station | 佐賀公園駅（さがこうえん） |
| Sagamihara Station | 相模原駅（さがみはら） |
| Sagami-Kaneko Station | 相模金子駅（さがみかねこ） |
| Sagamiko Station | 相模湖駅（さがみこ） |
| Sagamino Station | さがみ野駅（さがみの） |
| Sagami-Numata Station | 相模沼田駅（さがみぬまた） |
| Sagami-Ōno Station | 相模大野駅（さがみおおの） |
| Sagami-Ōtsuka Station | 相模大塚駅（さがみおおつか） |
| Sagarahan-Ganjōji Station | 相良藩願成寺駅（さがらはんがんじょうじ） |
| Sagara-Toshima Station | 相良十島駅（さがらとしま） |
| Saginomiya Station (Shizuoka) | さぎの宮駅（さぎのみや） |
| Saginomiya Station (Tokyo) | 鷺ノ宮駅（さぎのみや） |
| Saginuma Station | 鷺沼駅（さぎぬま） |
| Sagoshi Station | 砂越駅（さごし） |
| Sai Station | 西院駅（さい） |
| Saichi Station | 最知駅（さいち） |
| Saidaiji Station | 西大寺駅（さいだいじ） |
| Saidōsho Station | 採銅所駅（さいどうしょ） |
| Saigane Station | 西金駅（さいがね） |
| Saigata Station | 犀潟駅（さいがた） |
| Saigawa Station | 犀川駅（さいがわ） |
| Saigō Station | 西郷駅（さいごう） |
| Saiin Station | 西院駅（さいいん） |
| Saijō Station | 西条駅 (広島県)（さいじょう） |
| Saiki Station | 佐伯駅（さいき） |
| Saikū Station | 斎宮駅（さいくう） |
| Saimyōji Station | 西明寺駅（さいみょうじ） |
| Saishun Iryo Center Mae Station | 再春医療センター前駅（さいしゅんいりょうせんたーまえ） |
| Saitama-Shintoshin Station | さいたま新都心駅（さいたましんとしん） |
| Saito-Nishi Station | 彩都西駅（さいとにし） |
| Saitozaki Station | 西戸崎駅（さいとざき） |
| Saiwai Station | 幸駅（さいわい） |
| Saka Station | 坂駅（さか） |
| Sakabe Station | 坂部駅（さかべ） |
| Sakado Station (Fukuoka) | 酒殿駅（さかど） |
| Sakado Station (Ibaraki) | 坂戸駅 (茨城県)（さかど） |
| Sakado Station (Saitama) | 坂戸駅（さかど） |
| Sakae Station (Aichi) | 栄駅 (愛知県)（さかえ） |
| Sakae Station (Hyogo) | 栄駅 (兵庫県)（さかえ） |
| Sakae Station (Okayama) | 栄駅 (岡山県)（さかえ） |
| Sakaechō Station (Chiba) | 栄町駅 (千葉県)（さかえちょう） |
| Sakaechō Station (Tokyo) | 栄町停留場 (東京都)（さかえちょう） |
| Sakaemachi Station (Aichi) | 栄町駅 (愛知県)（さかえまち） |
| Sakaemachi Station (Hokkaido) | 栄町駅 (札幌市)（さかえまち） |
| Sakaemachi Station (Toyama) | 栄町駅 (富山県)（さかえまち） |
| Sakahogi Station | 坂祝駅（さかほぎ） |
| Sakai Station | 堺駅（さかい） |
| Sakaibashi Station | 坂井橋駅（さかいばし） |
| Sakaida Station | 堺田駅（さかいだ） |
| Sakaide Station | 坂出駅（さかいで） |
| Sakai-Higashi Station | 堺東駅（さかいひがし） |
| Sakaimachi Station | 境町駅（さかいまち） |
| Sakaimatsu Station | 境松駅（さかいまつ） |
| Sakaiminato Station | 境港駅（さかいみなと） |
| Sakaishi Station | 堺市駅（さかいし） |
| Sakaisuji-Hommachi Station | 堺筋本町駅（さかいすじほんまち） |
| Sakakami Station | 坂上駅（さかかみ） |
| Sakaki Station | 坂城駅（さかき） |
| Sakakibara-Onsenguchi Station | 榊原温泉口駅（さかきばらおんせんぐち） |
| Sakakita Station | 坂北駅（さかきた） |
| Sakamachi Station | 坂町駅（さかまち） |
| Sakamoto Station (Kumamoto) | 坂本駅 (熊本県)（さかもと） |
| Sakamoto Station (Miyagi) | 坂元駅（さかもと） |
| Sakamoto-hieizanguchi Station | 坂本比叡山口駅（さかもとひえいざんぐち） |
| Sakane Station | 坂根駅（さかね） |
| Sakanoichi Station | 坂ノ市駅（さかのいち） |
| Sakanoue Station | 坂之上駅（さかのうえ） |
| Sakaori Station | 酒折駅（さかおり） |
| Sakari Station | 盛駅（さかり） |
| Sakasai Station | 逆井駅（さかさい） |
| Sakasegawa Station | 逆瀬川駅（さかせがわ） |
| Sakashita Station | 坂下駅（さかした） |
| Sakata Station (Shiga) | 坂田駅（さかた） |
| Sakata Station (Yamagata) | 酒田駅（さかた） |
| Sakawa Station | 佐川駅（さかわ） |
| Sakidaira Station | 崎平駅（さきだいら） |
| Sakihana Station | 咲花駅（さきはな） |
| Sakimori Station | 崎守駅（さきもり） |
| Sakiyama Station | 崎山駅（さきやま） |
| Sakkuru Station | 咲来駅（さっくる） |
| Sako Station | 佐古駅（さこ） |
| Sakō Station | 栄生駅（さこう） |
| Sakogi Station | 佐古木駅（さこぎ） |
| Sakoshi Station | 坂越駅（さこし） |
| Saku Station | 佐久駅（さく） |
| Sakudaira Station | 佐久平駅（さくだいら） |
| Sakugiguchi Station | 作木口駅（さくぎぐち） |
| Saku-Hirose Station | 佐久広瀬駅（さくひろせ） |
| Sakuma Station | 佐久間駅（さくま） |
| Sakunami Station | 作並駅（さくなみ） |
| Sakura Station (Aichi) | 桜駅 (愛知県)（さくら） |
| Sakura Station (Chiba) | 佐倉駅（さくら） |
| Sakura Station (Mie) | 桜駅 (三重県)（さくら） |
| Sakurabashi Station (Shizuoka) | 桜橋駅 (静岡県)（さくらばし） |
| Sakurabashi Station (Toyama) | 桜橋停留場（さくらばし） |
| Sakuradai Station (Fukuoka) | 桜台駅 (福岡県)（さくらだい） |
| Sakuradai Station (Tokyo) | 桜台駅 (東京都)（さくらだい） |
| Sakuradamon Station | 桜田門駅（さくらだもん） |
| Sakuragaoka Station | 桜ヶ丘駅（さくらがおか） |
| Sakuragawa Station (Osaka) | 桜川駅 (大阪府)（さくらがわ） |
| Sakuragawa Station (Shiga) | 桜川駅 (滋賀県)（さくらがわ） |
| Sakuragi Station (Chiba) | 桜木駅 (千葉県)（さくらぎ） |
| Sakuragi Station (Shizuoka) | 桜木駅 (静岡県)（さくらぎ） |
| Sakuragichō Station | 桜木町駅（さくらぎちょう） |
| Sakurahommachi Station | 桜本町駅（さくらほんまち） |
| Sakurai Station (Aichi) | 桜井駅 (愛知県)（さくらい） |
| Sakurai Station (Nara) | 桜井駅 (奈良県)（さくらい） |
| Sakurai Station (Osaka) | 桜井駅 (大阪府)（さくらい） |
| Sakurajima Station | 桜島駅（さくらじま） |
| Sakurajōsui Station | 桜上水駅（さくらじょうすい） |
| Sakurakaidō Station | 桜街道駅（さくらかいどう） |
| Sakuramachi Station (Nagano) | 桜町駅（さくらまち） |
| Sakuramachi Station (Nagasaki) | 桜町停留場（さくらまち） |
| Sakuramachimae Station | 桜町前駅（さくらまちまえ） |
| Sakurambo Higashine Station | さくらんぼ東根駅（さくらんぼひがしね） |
| Sakuramizu Station | 桜水駅（さくらみず） |
| Sakuranamiki Station | 桜並木駅（さくらなみき） |
| Sakuranomiya Station | 桜ノ宮駅（さくらのみや） |
| Sakuraoka Station | 桜岡駅（さくらおか） |
| Sakurasawa Station | 桜沢駅 (長野県)（さくらさわ） |
| Sakura-Shinmachi Station | 桜新町駅（さくらしんまち） |
| Sakura Shukugawa Station | さくら夙川駅（さくらしゅくがわ） |
| Sakurayama Station | 桜山駅（さくらやま） |
| Sakurazaka Station | 桜坂駅（さくらざか） |
| Sakurazawa Station | 桜沢駅 (埼玉県)（さくらざわ） |
| Sakusabe Station | 作草部駅（さくさべ） |
| Saku-Uminokuchi Station | 佐久海ノ口駅（さくうみのくち） |
| Sakyōyama Station | 左京山駅（さきょうやま） |
| Samani Station | 様似駅（さまに） |
| Sambashidōri-Gochōme Station | 桟橋通五丁目駅（さんばしどおりごちょうめ） |
| Sambashi-Shakomae Station | 桟橋車庫前駅（さんばししゃこまえ） |
| Sambommatsu Station (Kagawa) | 三本松駅 (香川県)（さんぼんまつ） |
| Sambommatsu Station (Nara) | 三本松駅 (奈良県)（さんぼんまつ） |
| Sambommatsuguchi Station | 三本松口駅（さんぼんまつぐち） |
| Same Station | 鮫駅（さめ） |
| Samegai Station | 醒ヶ井駅（さめがい） |
| Samezu Station | 鮫洲駅（さめず） |
| Samitagawa Station | 佐味田川駅（さみたがわ） |
| Samizo Station | 三溝駅（さみぞ） |
| Sammaibashi Station | 三枚橋駅（さんまいばし） |
| Sammi Station | 三見駅（さんみ） |
| Sammon Station | 山門駅（さんもん） |
| Samukawa Station | 寒川駅（さむかわ） |
| Samuraihama Station | 侍浜駅（さむらいはま） |
| Sana Station | 佐奈駅（さな） |
| Sanage Station | 猿投駅（さなげ） |
| Sanagu Station | 佐那具駅（さなぐ） |
| Sanda Station | 三田駅 (兵庫県)（さんだ） |
| Sanda-Hommachi Station | 三田本町駅（さんだほんまち） |
| Sandō Station | 山東駅（さんどう） |
| Sangamori Station | 三ヶ森駅（さんがもり） |
| Sangane Station | 三ヶ根駅（さんがね） |
| Sangenjaya Station | 三軒茶屋駅（さんげんぢゃや） |
| Sangō Station (Aichi) | 三郷駅 (愛知県)（さんごう） |
| Sangō Station (Nara) | 三郷駅 (奈良県)（さんごう） |
| Sangūbashi Station | 参宮橋駅（さんぐうばし） |
| Sangyō Shinkō Center Station | 産業振興センター駅（さんぎょうしんこうせんたー） |
| Sanjō Station (Fukuoka) | 山上駅 (福岡県)（さんじょう） |
| Sanjō Station (Kagawa) | 三条駅 (香川県)（さんじょう） |
| Sanjō Station (Kyoto) | 三条駅 (京都府)（さんじょう） |
| Sanjō Station (Niigata) | 三条駅 (新潟県)（さんじょう） |
| Sanjō-Keihan Station | 三条京阪駅（さんじょうけいはん） |
| Sanjūhassha Station | 三十八社駅（さんじゅうはっしゃ） |
| Sannohe Station | 三戸駅（さんのへ） |
| Sannomiya Station (JR West) | 三ノ宮駅（さんのみや） |
| Sannomiya Station | 三宮駅（さんのみや） |
| Sannomiya-Hanadokeimae Station | 三宮・花時計前駅（さんのみや・はなどけいまえ） |
| Sannō Station (Aichi) | 山王駅 (愛知県)（さんのう） |
| Sannō Station (Fukui) | 山王駅 (福井県)（さんのう） |
| Sano Station | 佐野駅（さの） |
| Sanonowatashi Station | 佐野のわたし駅（さののわたし） |
| Sanoshi Station | 佐野市駅（さのし） |
| Sanrigi Station | 三里木駅（さんりぎ） |
| Sanriku Station | 三陸駅（さんりく） |
| Sanroku Station (Fukuoka) | 山麓駅 (福岡県)（さんろく） |
| Sansai Station | 三才駅（さんさい） |
| Sanuki Station | 佐貫駅（さぬき） |
| Sanuki-Aioi Station | 讃岐相生駅（さぬきあいおい） |
| Sanuki-Fuchū Station | 讃岐府中駅（さぬきふちゅう） |
| Sanukimachi Station | 佐貫町駅（さぬきまち） |
| Sanuki-Mure Station | 讃岐牟礼駅（さぬきむれ） |
| Sanuki-Saida Station | 讃岐財田駅（さぬきさいだ） |
| Sanuki-Shioya Station | 讃岐塩屋駅（さぬきしおや） |
| Sanuki-Shirotori Station | 讃岐白鳥駅（さぬきしろとり） |
| Sanuki-Tsuda Station | 讃岐津田駅（さぬきつだ） |
| Sanyo Aboshi Station | 山陽網干駅（さんようあぼし） |
| Sanyo Akashi Station | 山陽明石駅（さんようあかし） |
| Sanyo Himeji Station | 山陽姫路駅（さんようひめじ） |
| Sanyō-Joshidaimae Station | 山陽女子大前駅（さんようじょしだいまえ） |
| Sanyo Shioya Station | 山陽塩屋駅（さんようしおや） |
| Sanyo Sone Station | 山陽曽根駅（さんようそね） |
| Sanyo Suma Station | 山陽須磨駅（さんようすま） |
| Sanyo Tarumi Station | 山陽垂水駅（さんようたるみ） |
| Sanyo Temma Station | 山陽天満駅（さんようてんま） |
| Sanyo Uozumi Station | 山陽魚住駅（さんよううおずみ） |
| Sanze Station | 三瀬駅（さんぜ） |
| Sappinai Station | 札比内駅（さっぴない） |
| Sapporo Station | 札幌駅（さっぽろ） |
| Sapporo Station (Sapporo Municipal Subway) | さっぽろ駅 |
| Sapporo Beer Teien Station | サッポロビール庭園駅（サッポロビールていえん） |
| Sapporo Kamotsu Terminal Station | 札幌貨物ターミナル駅（さっぽろかもつたーみなる） |
| Sarayama Station | 佐良山駅（さらやま） |
| Sari Station | 佐里駅（さり） |
| Saruda Station | 猿田駅（さるだ） |
| Saruhashi Station | 猿橋駅（さるはし） |
| Saruiwa Station | 猿岩駅（さるいわ） |
| Saruwada Station | 猿和田駅（さるわだ） |
| Sasabara Station | 篠原駅 (愛知県)（ささばら） |
| Sasabaru Station | 笹原駅（ささばる） |
| Sasabe Station | 笹部駅（ささべ） |
| Sasagawa Station | 笹川駅（ささがわ） |
| Sasago Station | 笹子駅（ささご） |
| Sasaguri Station | 篠栗駅（ささぐり） |
| Sasaharada Station | 笹原田駅（ささはらだ） |
| Sasaki Station | 佐々木駅（ささき） |
| Sasakino Station | 笹木野駅（ささきの） |
| Sasashima-raibu Station | ささしまライブ駅（ささしまらいぶ） |
| Sasaya Station | 笹谷駅（ささや） |
| Sasayamaguchi Station | 篠山口駅（ささやまぐち） |
| Sasazu Station | 笹津駅（ささづ） |
| Sasazuka Station | 笹塚駅（ささづか） |
| Sasebo Station | 佐世保駅（させぼ） |
| Sasebo-Chūō Station | 佐世保中央駅（させぼちゅうおう） |
| Sashiki Station | 佐敷駅（さしき） |
| Sashimaki Station | 刺巻駅（さしまき） |
| Sashiōgi Station | 指扇駅（さしおうぎ） |
| Sashiu Station | 佐志生駅（さしう） |
| Sato Station | 里駅（さと） |
| Satomi Station | 里見駅（さとみ） |
| Satoshiraishi Station | 里白石駅（さとしらいし） |
| Satoshō Station | 里庄駅（さとしょう） |
| Satsu Station | 佐津駅（さつ） |
| Satsueisho-mae Station | 撮影所前駅（さつえいしょまえ） |
| Satsu Station | 佐津駅（さつ） |
| Satsukari Station | 札苅駅（さつかり） |
| Satsukidai Station | 五月台駅（さつきだい） |
| Satsukino Station | さつき野駅（さつきの） |
| Satsuma-Imaizumi Station | 薩摩今和泉駅（さつまいまいずみ） |
| Satsuma-Itashiki Station | 薩摩板敷駅（さつまいたしき） |
| Satsuma-Kawashiri Station | 薩摩川尻駅（さつまかわしり） |
| Satsuma-Matsumoto Station | 薩摩松元駅（さつままつもと） |
| Satsuma-Ōkawa Station | 薩摩大川駅（さつまおおかわ） |
| Satsuma-Shioya Station | 薩摩塩屋駅（さつましおや） |
| Satsuma-Taki Station | 薩摩高城駅（さつまたき） |
| Satsunai Station | 札内駅（さつない） |
| Satte Station | 幸手駅（さって） |
| Satteki Station | 札的駅（さってき） |
| Sattsuru Station | 札弦駅（さっつる） |
| Sawa Station (Ibaraki) | 佐和駅（さわ） |
| Sawa Station (Nagano) | 沢駅（さわ） |
| Sawabe Station | 沢辺駅（さわべ） |
| Sawada Station | 沢田駅（さわだ） |
| Sawadani Station | 沢谷駅（さわだに） |
| Sawai Station | 沢井駅（さわい） |
| Sawajiri Station | 沢尻駅（さわじり） |
| Sawama Station | 沢間駅（さわま） |
| Sawame Station | 沢目駅（さわめ） |
| Sawanakayama Station | 沢中山駅（さわなかやま） |
| Sawando Station | 沢渡駅（さわんど） |
| Sawanochō Station | 沢ノ町駅（さわのちょう） |
| Sawara Station | 佐原駅（さわら） |
| Sawaragi Station | 沢良宜駅（さわらぎ） |
| Saya Station | 佐屋駅（さや） |
| Sayama Station | 狭山駅（さやま） |
| Sayamagaoka Station | 狭山ヶ丘駅（さやまがおか） |
| Sayamashi Station | 狭山市駅（さやまし） |
| Sayo Station | 佐用駅（さよ） |
| Saza Station | 佐々駅（さざ） |

=== Sc-Se ===
| Screen Station | スクリーン駅（すくりーん） |
| Seba Station | 洗馬駅（せば） |
| Sechigo Station | 清児駅（せちご） |
| Segoshi Station | 瀬越駅（せごし） |
| Seheji Station | 瀬辺地駅（せへじ） |
| Seiaichūkō-mae Station | 聖愛中高前駅（せいあいちゅうこうまえ） |
| Seibijō Station | 整備場駅（せいびじょう） |
| Seibu Chichibu Station | 西武秩父駅（せいぶちちぶ） |
| Seibuen Station | 西武園駅（せいぶえん） |
| Seibuen-yūenchi Station | 西武園ゆうえんち駅（せいぶえんゆうえんち） |
| Seibukyūjō-mae Station | 西武球場前駅（せいぶきゅうじょうまえ） |
| Seibu Shinjuku Station | 西武新宿駅（せいぶしんじゅく） |
| Seibu Tachikawa Station | 西武立川駅（せいぶたちかわ） |
| Seibu Yagisawa Station | 西武柳沢駅（せいぶやぎさわ） |
| Seihama Station | 勢浜駅（せいはま） |
| Seihōkōkōmae Station | 清峰高校前駅（せいほうこうこうまえ） |
| Seijōgakuen-Mae Station | 成城学園前駅（せいじょうがくえんまえ） |
| Seikan Tunnel Kinenkan Station | 青函トンネル記念館駅（せいかんとんねるきねんかん） |
| Seikibashi Station | 清輝橋駅（せいきばし） |
| Seimei Station | 清明駅（せいめい） |
| Seiryo High School Station | 清陵高校前停留場（せいりょうこうこうまえ） |
| Seiryū-Miharashi Station | 清流みはらし駅（せいりゅうみはらし） |
| Seiryū-Shin-Iwakuni Station | 清流新岩国駅（せいりゅうしんいわくに） |
| Seiseki-Sakuragaoka Station | 聖蹟桜ヶ丘駅（せいせきさくらがおか） |
| Seishin-Chūō Station | 西神中央駅（せいしんちゅうおう） |
| Seishin-Minami Station | 西神南駅（せいしんみなみ） |
| Seishūgakuenmae Station | 静修学園前駅（せいしゅうがくえんまえ） |
| Seiwagakuenmae Station | 清和学園前駅（せいわがくえんまえ） |
| Seki Station (Gifu) | 関駅 (岐阜県)（せき） |
| Seki Station (Mie) | 関駅 (三重県)（せき） |
| Sekigahara Station | 関ヶ原駅（せきがはら） |
| Sekigawa Station | 関川駅（せきがわ） |
| Sekiguchi Station | 関口駅（せきぐち） |
| Sekijūjibyōinmae Station | 赤十字病院前駅（せきじゅうじびょういんまえ） |
| Sekijūjimae Station | 赤十字前駅（せきじゅうじまえ） |
| Sekime Station | 関目駅（せきめ） |
| Sekime-Seiiku Station | 関目成育駅（せきめせいいく） |
| Sekime-Takadono Station | 関目高殿駅（せきめたかどの） |
| Sekine Station | 関根駅（せきね） |
| Sekinomiya Station | 関ノ宮駅（せきのみや） |
| Sekishi Station | 積志駅（せきし） |
| Seki-Shimouchi Station | 関下有知駅（せきしもうち） |
| Seki-Shiyakushomae Station | 関市役所前駅（せきしやくしょまえ） |
| Sekiterasumae Station | せきてらす前駅（せきてらすまえ） |
| Sekito Station | 関都駅（せきと） |
| Seki-Tomioka Station | 関富岡駅（せきとみおか） |
| Sekiya Station (Nara) | 関屋駅 (奈良県)（せきや） |
| Sekiya Station (Niigata) | 関屋駅 (新潟県)（せきや） |
| Sekiyama Station | 関山駅（せきやま） |
| Sembayashi Station | 千林駅（せんばやし） |
| Sembayashi-Ōmiya Station | 千林大宮駅（せんばやしおおみや） |
| Sembokuchō Station | 仙北町駅（せんぼくちょう） |
| Sembon Station | 千本駅（せんぼん） |
| Semine Station | 瀬峰駅（せみね） |
| Semi-Onsen Station | 瀬見温泉駅（せみおんせん） |
| Senchō Station | 千丁駅（せんちょう） |
| Senda Station | 千旦駅（せんだ） |
| Sendagaya Station | 千駄ヶ谷駅（せんだがや） |
| Sendagi Station | 千駄木駅（せんだぎ） |
| Sendai Station (Miyagi) | 仙台駅（せんだい） |
| Sendai Station (Kagoshima) | 川内駅 (鹿児島県)（せんだい） |
| Sendai Airport Station | 仙台空港駅（せんだいくうこう） |
| Sendaifutō Station | 仙台埠頭駅（せんだいふとう） |
| Sendai-Kitakō Station | 仙台北港駅（せんだいきたこう） |
| Sendaikō Station | 仙台港駅（せんだいこう） |
| Sendai-Nishikō Station | 仙台西港駅（せんだいにしこう） |
| Sendaira Station | 千平駅（せんだいら） |
| Sengakuji Station | 泉岳寺駅（せんがくじ） |
| Sengan-en Station | 仙巌園駅（せんがんえん） |
| Sengawa Station | 仙川駅（せんがわ） |
| Sengencho Station | 浅間町駅（せんげんちょう） |
| Sengendai Station | せんげん台駅（せんげんだい） |
| Sengoku Station | 千石駅（せんごく） |
| Senjō Station | 千丈駅（せんじょう） |
| Senjōjiki Station | 千畳敷駅 (青森県)（せんじょうじき） |
| Senju-Ōhashi Station | 千住大橋駅（せんじゅおおはし） |
| Senkawa Station | 千川駅（せんかわ） |
| Senmaya Station | 千厩駅（せんまや） |
| Seno Station | 瀬野駅（せの） |
| Senoo Station | 妹尾駅（せのお） |
| Senoue Station | 瀬上駅（せのうえ） |
| Senpukuji Station | 泉福寺駅（せんぷくじ） |
| Senri-Chūō Station | 千里中央駅（せんりちゅうおう） |
| Senrioka Station | 千里丘駅（せんりおか） |
| Senriyama Station | 千里山駅（せんりやま） |
| Senryūgataki Station | 潜竜ヶ滝駅（せんりゅうがたき） |
| Sentoku Station | 千徳駅（せんとく） |
| Senzai Station | 前栽駅（せんざい） |
| Senzaki Station | 仙崎駅（せんざき） |
| Senzoku Station | 洗足駅（せんぞく） |
| Senzoku-Ike Station | 洗足池駅（せんぞくいけ） |
| Senzu Station | 千頭駅（せんず） |
| Seppu Station | 節婦駅（せっぷ） |
| Serada Station | 世良田駅（せらだ） |
| Sesekushi Station | 瀬々串駅（せせくし） |
| Sessokyō-Onsen Station | 接岨峡温泉駅（せっそきょうおんせん） |
| Seta Station (Kumamoto) | 瀬田駅 (熊本県)（せた） |
| Seta Station (Shiga) | 瀬田駅 (滋賀県)（せた） |
| Setagaya Station | 世田谷駅（せたがや） |
| Setagaya-Daita Station | 世田谷代田駅（せたがやだいた） |
| Setaka Station | 瀬高駅（せたか） |
| Seto Station | 瀬戸駅（せと） |
| Setoguchi Station | 瀬戸口駅（せとぐち） |
| Setoishi Station | 瀬戸石駅（せといし） |
| Setose Station | 瀬戸瀬駅（せとせ） |
| Setoshi Station | 瀬戸市駅（せとし） |
| Seto-Shiyakushomae Station | 瀬戸市役所前駅（せとしやくしょまえ） |
| Settai Station | 摂待駅（せったい） |
| Settsu Station | 摂津駅（せっつ） |
| Settsu-Motoyama Station | 摂津本山駅（せっつもとやま） |
| Settsu-shi Station | 摂津市駅（せっつし） |
| Settsu-Tonda Station | 摂津富田駅（せっつとんだ） |
| Seya Station | 瀬谷駅（せや） |
| Seya-Kitaguchi Station | 勢野北口駅（せやきたぐち） |

=== Sha-Shim ===
| Shadai Station | 社台駅（しゃだい） |
| Shaguma Station | 舎熊駅（しゃぐま） |
| Shake Station | 社家駅（しゃけ） |
| Shakubetsu Station | 尺別駅（しゃくべつ） |
| Shakudo Station | 尺土駅（しゃくど） |
| Shakujiikōen Station | 石神井公園駅（しゃくじいこうえん） |
| Shibahara Station | 柴原駅（しばはら） |
| Shibahashi Station | 柴橋駅（しばはし） |
| Shibahira Station | 柴平駅（しばひら） |
| Shibajuku Station | 柴宿駅（しばじゅく） |
| Shibakawa Station | 芝川駅（しばかわ） |
| Shibakōen Station | 芝公園駅（しばこうえん） |
| Shibamata Station | 柴又駅（しばまた） |
| Shibasaki Station | 柴崎駅（しばさき） |
| Shibasaki-Taiikukan Station | 柴崎体育館駅（しばさきたいいくかん） |
| Shibata Station (Aichi) | 柴田駅（しばた） |
| Shibata Station (Niigata) | 新発田駅（しばた） |
| Shibaura-futō Station | 芝浦ふ頭駅（しばうらふとう） |
| Shibayama Station | 柴山駅（しばやま） |
| Shibayama-Chiyoda Station | 芝山千代田駅（しばやまちよだ） |
| Shibecha Station | 標茶駅（しべちゃ） |
| Shibetsu Station | 士別駅（しべつ） |
| Shibukawa Station | 渋川駅（しぶかわ） |
| Shibuki Station | 渋木駅（しぶき） |
| Shibun Station | 志文駅（しぶん） |
| Shibusawa Station | 渋沢駅（しぶさわ） |
| Shibushi Station | 志布志駅（しぶし） |
| Shibutami Station | 渋民駅（しぶたみ） |
| Shibuya Station | 渋谷駅（しぶや） |
| Shichidō Station | 七道駅（しちどう） |
| Shichijō Station | 七条駅（しちじょう） |
| Shichikenjaya Station | 七軒茶屋駅（しちけんぢゃや） |
| Shichinohe-Towada Station | 七戸十和田駅（しちのへとわだ） |
| Shichirigahama Station | 七里ヶ浜駅（しちりがはま） |
| Shidai-igakubu Station | 市大医学部駅（しだいいがくぶ） |
| Shido Station | 志度駅（しど） |
| Shiga Station | 志賀駅（しが） |
| Shiga-hondōri Station | 志賀本通駅（しがほんどおり） |
| Shigaraki Station | 信楽駅（しがらき） |
| Shigarakigūshi Station | 紫香楽宮跡駅（しがらきぐうし） |
| Shigasato Station | 滋賀里駅（しがさと） |
| Shigehara Station | 重原駅（しげはら） |
| Shigeno Station | 滋野駅（しげの） |
| Shigeoka Station | 重岡駅（しげおか） |
| Shigetō Station | 繁藤駅（しげとう） |
| Shigetomi Station | 重富駅（しげとみ） |
| Shigeyasu Station | 重安駅（しげやす） |
| Shigino Station | 鴫野駅（しぎの） |
| Shigisanguchi Station | 信貴山口駅（しぎさんぐち） |
| Shigisanshita Station | 信貴山下駅（しぎさんした） |
| Shigō Station | 四郷駅（しごう） |
| Shii Station (JR Kyushu) | 志井駅 (JR九州)（しい） |
| Shii Station (Kitakyushu Monorail) | 志井駅 (北九州高速鉄道)（しい） |
| Shiida Station | 椎田駅（しいだ） |
| Shiikōen Station | 志井公園駅（しいこうえん） |
| Shiinamachi Station | 椎名町駅（しいなまち） |
| Shiishiba Station | 椎柴駅（しいしば） |
| Shiizakai Station | 志比堺駅（しいざかい） |
| Shijima Station | 四十万駅（しじま） |
| Shijimi Station | 志染駅（しじみ） |
| Shijō Station | 四条駅（しじょう） |
| Shijōmae Station | 市場前駅（しじょうまえ） |
| Shijōnawate Station | 四条畷駅（しじょうなわて） |
| Shijō-Ōmiya Station | 四条大宮駅（しじょうおおみや） |
| Shijuku Station | 四十九駅（しじゅく） |
| Shikabe Station | 鹿部駅（しかべ） |
| Shikaga Station | 鹿賀駅（しかが） |
| Shikaka Station | 鹿家駅（しかか） |
| Shikama Station | 飾磨駅（しかま） |
| Shikamura Station | 四箇村駅（しかむら） |
| Shikanotani Station | 鹿ノ谷駅（しかのたに） |
| Shikaribetsu Station | 然別駅（しかりべつ） |
| Shikauchi Station | 鹿討駅（しかうち） |
| Shiki Station (Osaka) | 志紀駅（しき） |
| Shiki Station (Saitama) | 志木駅（しき） |
| Shikibu Station | しきぶ駅 |
| Shikido Station | 敷戸駅（しきど） |
| Shikiji Station | 敷地駅（しきじ） |
| Shikijiki Station | 式敷駅（しきじき） |
| Shikinami Station | 敷浪駅（しきなみ） |
| Shikinosato Station | 四季の郷駅（しきのさと） |
| Shikishima Station | 敷島駅（しきしま） |
| Shiku Station | 志久駅（しく） |
| Shima-Akasaki Station | 志摩赤崎駅（しまあかさき） |
| Shimabara Station | 島原駅（しまばら） |
| Shimabara-Funatsu Station | 島原船津駅（しまばらふなつ） |
| Shimabarakō Station | 島原港駅（しまばらこう） |
| Shimada Station | 島田駅 (静岡県)（しまだ） |
| Shimagahara Station | 島ヶ原駅（しまがはら） |
| Shima-Isobe Station | 志摩磯部駅（しまいそべ） |
| Shimamatsu Station | 島松駅（しままつ） |
| Shimamoto Station | 島本駅（しまもと） |
| Shimanokoshi Station | 島越駅（しまのこし） |
| Shimanoseki Station | 島ノ関駅（しまのせき） |
| Shimanoshita Station | 島ノ下駅（しまのした） |
| Shimao Station | 島尾駅（しまお） |
| Shima-Shimmei Station | 志摩神明駅（しましんめい） |
| Shimata Station | 島田駅 (山口県)（しまた） |
| Shimatakamatsu Station | 島高松駅（しまたかまつ） |
| Shimauchi Station | 島内駅（しまうち） |
| Shima-Ujinaga Station | 島氏永駅（しまうじなが） |
| Shima-Yokoyama Station | 志摩横山駅（しまよこやま） |
| Shimbamba Station | 新馬場駅（しんばんば） |
| Shimbaru Station | 新原駅（しんばる） |
| Shimbashi Station | 新橋駅（しんばし） |
| Shiminbyōin-mae Station (Toyama) | 市民病院前停留場（しみんびょういんまえ） |
| Shimin Hiroba Station | 市民広場駅（しみんひろば） |
| Shiminkōen-mae Station | 市民公園前駅（しみんこうえんまえ） |
| Shimizu Station (Aichi) | 清水駅 (愛知県)（しみず） |
| Shimizu Station (Osaka) | 清水駅 (大阪府)（しみず） |
| Shimizu Station (Shizuoka) | 清水駅 (静岡県)（しみず） |
| Shimizugawa Station | 清水川駅（しみずがわ） |
| Shimizuhara Station | 清水原駅（しみずはら） |
| Shimizukōen Station | 清水公園駅（しみずこうえん） |
| Shimizumachi Station | 清水町駅（しみずまち） |
| Shimizusawa Station | 清水沢駅（しみずさわ） |
| Shimizuura Station | 冷水浦駅（しみずうら） |
| Shimmachi Station (Gunma) | 新町駅（しんまち） |
| Shimmachi Station (Kumamoto) | 新町停留場（しんまち） |
| Shimmei Station (Fukui) | 神明駅 (福井県)（しんめい） |
| Shimmei Station (Hokkaido) | 神明駅 (北海道)（しんめい） |
| Shimmeichō Station | 神明町駅（しんめいちょう） |
| Shimmori-Furuichi Station | 新森古市駅（しんもりふるいち） |
| Shimo Station | 志茂駅（しも） |
| Shimo-Akatsuka Station | 下赤塚駅（しもあかつか） |
| Shimo-Amazu Station | 下天津駅（しもあまづ） |
| Shimo-Asō Station | 下麻生駅（しもあそう） |
| Shimobeonsen Station | 下部温泉駅（しもべおんせん） |
| Shimoda Station | 下田駅（しもだ） |
| Shimodaira Station | 下平駅（しもだいら） |
| Shimodate Station | 下館駅（しもだて） |
| Shimodate-Nikōmae Station | 下館二高前駅（しもだてにこうまえ） |
| Shimo-Fukawa Station | 下深川駅（しもふかわ） |
| Shimo-Fukaya Station | 下深谷駅（しもふかや） |
| Shimofunato Station | 下船渡駅（しもふなと） |
| Shimo-Gion Station | 下祇園駅（しもぎおん） |
| Shimogiri Station | 下切駅（しもぎり） |
| Shimogōri Station | 下郡駅（しもごおり） |
| Shimo-Goshiro Station | 下小代駅（しもごしろ） |
| Shimohama Station | 下浜駅（しもはま） |
| Shimo-Hōjō Station | 下北条駅（しもほうじょう） |
| Shimohyōgo Station | 下兵庫駅（しもひょうご） |
| Shimohyogo Kofuku Station | 下兵庫こうふく駅（しもひょうごこうふく） |
| Shimoichi Station | 下市駅（しもいち） |
| Shimo-Ichida Station | 下市田駅（しもいちだ） |
| Shimoichiguchi Station | 下市口駅（しもいちぐち） |
| Shimo-Igusa Station | 下井草駅（しもいぐさ） |
| Shimoiida Station | 下飯田駅（しもいいだ） |
| Shimo-Imaichi Station | 下今市駅（しもいまいち） |
| Shimo-Isaka Station | 下井阪駅（しもいさか） |
| Shimo-Ita Station | 下伊田駅（しもいた） |
| Shimo-Itabashi Station | 下板橋駅（しもいたばし） |
| Shimoizumi Station | 下泉駅（しもいずみ） |
| Shimoji Station | 下地駅（しもじ） |
| Shimojima Station (Ina) | 下島駅 (長野県伊那市)（しもじま） |
| Shimojima Station (Matsumoto) | 下島駅 (長野県松本市)（しもじま） |
| Shimo-Kamoo Station | 下鴨生駅（しもかもお） |
| Shimo-Kanayama Station | 下金山駅（しもかなやま） |
| Shimo-Kawabe Station | 下川辺駅（しもかわべ） |
| Shimo-Kawai Station | 下川合駅（しもかわい） |
| Shimokawazoi Station | 下川沿駅（しもかわぞい） |
| Shimokita Station | 下北駅（しもきた） |
| Shimo-Kitazawa Station | 下北沢駅（しもきたざわ） |
| Shimokoma Station | 下狛駅（しもこま） |
| Shimokosawa Station | 下古沢駅（しもこさわ） |
| Shimokō Station | 下府駅（しもこう） |
| Shimokuno Station | 下久野駅（しもくの） |
| Shimo-Maruko Station | 下丸子駅（しもまるこ） |
| Shimomatsu Station | 下松駅 (大阪府)（しもまつ） |
| Shimomizo Station | 下溝駅（しもみぞ） |
| Shimonada Station | 下灘駅（しもなだ） |
| Shimonagaya Station | 下永谷駅（しもながや） |
| Shimonii Station | 下新駅（しもにい） |
| Shimonita Station | 下仁田駅（しもにた） |
| Shimonogō Station | 下之郷駅（しものごう） |
| Shimonomiya Station | 下野宮駅（しものみや） |
| Shimonoseki Station | 下関駅（しものせき） |
| Shimonoshiro Station | 下野代駅（しものしろ） |
| Shimonoshō Station | 下庄駅（しものしょう） |
| Shimonuma Station | 下沼駅（しもぬま） |
| Shimo-Ochiai Station | 下落合駅（しもおちあい） |
| Shimo-Ogawa Station | 下小川駅（しもおがわ） |
| Shimo-Okui Station | 下奥井駅（しもおくい） |
| Shimoōri Station | 下大利駅（しもおおり） |
| Shimo-Otai Station | 下小田井駅（しもおたい） |
| Shimōsa-Kōzaki Station | 下総神崎駅（しもうさこうざき） |
| Shimōsa-Manzaki Station | 下総松崎駅（しもうさまんざき） |
| Shimōsa-Nakayama Station | 下総中山駅（しもうさなかやま） |
| Shimōsa-Tachibana Station | 下総橘駅（しもうさたちばな） |
| Shimosato Station | 下里駅（しもさと） |
| Shimōsa-Toyosato Station | 下総豊里駅（しもうさとよさと） |
| Shimo-Shibetsu Station | 下士別駅（しもしべつ） |
| Shimo-Shii Station | 下志比駅（しもしい） |
| Shimo-Shinden Station | 下新田駅（しもしんでん） |
| Shimo-Shinjō Station | 下新庄駅（しもしんじょう） |
| Shimo-Shinmei Station | 下神明駅（しもしんめい） |
| Shimo-Shirataki Station | 下白滝駅（しもしらたき） |
| Shimo-Soga Station | 下曽我駅（しもそが） |
| Shimo-Sone Station | 下曽根駅（しもそね） |
| Shimo-Sugaya Station | 下菅谷駅（しもすがや） |
| Shimo-Suwa Station | 下諏訪駅（しもすわ） |
| Shimo-Takaido Station | 下高井戸駅（しもたかいど） |
| Shimotaki Station | 下滝駅（しもたき） |
| Shimotogari Station | 下土狩駅（しもとがり） |
| Shimotoppu Station | 下徳富駅（しもとっぷ） |
| Shimotsu Station | 下津駅（しもつ） |
| Shimotsuke-Hanaoka Station | 下野花岡駅（しもつけはなおか） |
| Shimotsuke-Ōsawa Station | 下野大沢駅（しもつけおおさわ） |
| Shimotsuma Station | 下妻駅（しもつま） |
| Shimoura Station | 下浦駅（しもうら） |
| Shimo-Uwa Station | 下宇和駅（しもうわ） |
| Shimo-Wachi Station | 下和知駅（しもわち） |
| Shimo-Yakuno Station | 下夜久野駅（しもやくの） |
| Shimoyama Station (Kochi) | 下山駅 (高知県)（しもやま） |
| Shimoyama Station (Kyoto) | 下山駅 (京都府)（しもやま） |
| Shimo-Yamaguchi Station | 下山口駅（しもやまぐち） |
| Shimoyamamura Station | 下山村駅（しもやまむら） |
| Shimo-Yamato Station | 下山門駅（しもやまと） |
| Shimo-Yoshida Station | 下吉田駅（しもよしだ） |
| Shimoyui Station | 下油井駅（しもゆい） |
| Shimoyuino Station | 下唯野駅（しもゆいの） |
| Shimo-Yuzawa Station | 下湯沢駅（しもゆざわ） |
| Shimpu Station | 新府駅（しんぷ） |
| Shimukappu Station | 占冠駅（しむかっぷ） |
| Shimurasakaue Station | 志村坂上駅（しむらさかうえ） |
| Shimura Sanchome Station | 志村三丁目駅（しむらさんちょうめ） |

=== Shin ===
| Shinagawa Seaside Station | 品川シーサイド駅（しながわしーさいど） |
| Shinagawa Station | 品川駅（しながわ） |
| Shin-Ainoki Station | 新相ノ木駅（しんあいのき） |
| Shinainuma Station | 品井沼駅（しないぬま） |
| Shin-Akitsu Station | 新秋津駅（しんあきつ） |
| Shin-Anjō Station | 新安城駅（しんあんじょう） |
| Shinano-Arai Station | 信濃荒井駅（しなのあらい） |
| Shin-Aomori Station | 新青森駅（しんあおもり） |
| Shin-Asahi Station | 新旭駅（しんあさひ） |
| Shin-Asahikawa Station | 新旭川駅（しんあさひかわ） |
| Shinano-Asano Station | 信濃浅野駅（しなのあさの） |
| Shinano-Kawakami Station | 信濃川上駅（しなのかわかみ） |
| Shinano-Kawashima Station | 信濃川島駅（しなのかわしま） |
| Shinano-Kizaki Station | 信濃木崎駅（しなのきざき） |
| Shinano-Kokubunji Station | 信濃国分寺駅（しなのこくぶんじ） |
| Shinanomachi Station | 信濃町駅（しなのまち） |
| Shinano-Matsukawa Station | 信濃松川駅（しなのまつかわ） |
| Shinano-Moriue Station | 信濃森上駅（しなのもりうえ） |
| Shinano-Oiwake Station | 信濃追分駅（しなのおいわけ） |
| Shinano-Ōmachi Station | 信濃大町駅（しなのおおまち） |
| Shinano-Sakai Station | 信濃境駅（しなのさかい） |
| Shinano-Shiratori Station | 信濃白鳥駅（しなのしらとり） |
| Shinano-Taira Station | 信濃平駅（しなのたいら） |
| Shinano-Takehara Station | 信濃竹原駅（しなのたけはら） |
| Shinano-Tokiwa Station | 信濃常盤駅（しなのときわ） |
| Shinano-Yoshida Station | 信濃吉田駅（しなのよしだ） |
| Shinchi Station | 新地駅（しんち） |
| Shin-Chiba Station | 新千葉駅（しんちば） |
| Shindaita Station | 新代田駅（しんだいた） |
| Shindembaru Station | 新田原駅（しんでんばる） |
| Shinden Station (Kyoto) | 新田駅 (京都府)（しんでん） |
| Shinden Station (Saitama) | 新田駅 (埼玉県)（しんでん） |
| Shindō Station | 新堂駅（しんどう） |
| Shindō-Higashi Station | 新道東駅（しんどうひがし） |
| Shin-Egota Station | 新江古田駅（しんえごた） |
| Shin-Fuji Station (Hokkaido) | 新富士駅 (北海道)（しんふじ） |
| Shin-Fuji Station (Shizuoka) | 新富士駅 (静岡県)（しんふじ） |
| Shin-Fujiwara Station | 新藤原駅（しんふじわら） |
| Shin-Fukae Station | 新深江駅（しんふかえ） |
| Shin-Fukui Station | 新福井駅（しんふくい） |
| Shin-Fukushima Station | 新福島駅（しんふくしま） |
| Shin-Funabashi Station | 新船橋駅（しんふなばし） |
| Shingai Station | 新改駅（しんがい） |
| Shingashi Station | 新河岸駅（しんがし） |
| Shinge Station | 新家駅（しんげ） |
| Shingi Station | 新木停留場（しんぎ） |
| Shingō Station | 新郷駅 (埼玉県)（しんごう） |
| Shingū Station | 新宮駅（しんぐう） |
| Shingū-Chūō Station | 新宮中央駅（しんぐうちゅうおう） |
| Shin-Hakodate-Hokuto Station | 新函館北斗駅（しんはこだてほくと） |
| Shin-Hakushima Station | 新白島駅（しんはくしま） |
| Shin-Hamamatsu Station | 新浜松駅（しんはままつ） |
| Shin-Hanamaki Station | 新花巻駅（しんはなまき） |
| Shin-Hashima Station | 新羽島駅（しんはしま） |
| Shin-Hikida Station | 新疋田駅（しんひきだ） |
| Shin-Hirano Station | 新平野駅（しんひらの） |
| Shin-Hiro Station | 新広駅（しんひろ） |
| Shin-Hokota Station | 新鉾田駅（しんほこた） |
| Shin-Hōsono Station | 新祝園駅（しんほうその） |
| Shin-ichi Station | 新市駅（しんいち） |
| Shin-Iizuka Station | 新飯塚駅（しんいいづか） |
| Shin-Imamiya Station | 新今宮駅（しんいまみや） |
| Shin-Imamiya-Ekimae Station | 新今宮駅前停留場（しんいまみやえきまえ） |
| Shin-Inokuchi Station | 新井口駅（しんいのくち） |
| Shin-Isesaki Station | 新伊勢崎駅（しんいせさき） |
| Shin-Ishikiri Station | 新石切駅（しんいしきり） |
| Shin-Itabashi Station | 新板橋駅（しんいたばし） |
| Shin-Itami Station | 新伊丹駅（しんいたみ） |
| Shin-Iwakuni Station | 新岩国駅（しんいわくに） |
| Shinji Station | 宍道駅（しんじ） |
| Shinjō Station | 新庄駅（しんじょう） |
| Shinjohara Station | 新所原駅（しんじょはら） |
| Shinjō-Tanaka Station | 新庄田中駅（しんじょうたなか） |
| Shinjuku Station | 新宿駅（しんじゅく） |
| Shinjuku-gyoemmae Station | 新宿御苑前駅（しんじゅくぎょえんまえ） |
| Shinjuku-Nishiguchi Station | 新宿西口駅（しんじゅくにしぐち） |
| Shinjuku Sanchōme Station | 新宿三丁目駅（しんじゅくさんちょうめ） |
| Shinkaichi Station | 新開地駅（しんかいち） |
| Shin-Kamagaya Station | 新鎌ヶ谷駅（しんかまがや） |
| Shin-Kambara Station | 新蒲原駅（しんかんばら） |
| Shin-Kami Station | 新加美駅（しんかみ） |
| Shin-Kanaoka Station | 新金岡駅（しんかなおか） |
| Shin-Kanaya Station | 新金谷駅（しんかなや） |
| Shin-Kani Station | 新可児駅（しんかに） |
| Shin-Kanō Station | 新加納駅（しんかのう） |
| Shin-Kanuma Station | 新鹿沼駅（しんかぬま） |
| Shin-Kashiwa Station | 新柏駅（しんかしわ） |
| Shinkawa Station (Ehime) | 新川駅 (愛媛県)（しんかわ） |
| Shinkawa Station (Hokkaido) | 新川駅 (北海道)（しんかわ） |
| Shinkawabashi Station | 新川橋駅（しんかわばし） |
| Shinkawachō Station | 新川町停留場（しんかわちょう） |
| Shinkawamachi Station | 新川町駅（しんかわまち） |
| Shin-Kawasaki Station | 新川崎駅（しんかわさき） |
| Shin-Kemigawa Station | 新検見川駅（しんけみがわ） |
| Shin-Kiba Station | 新木場駅（しんきば） |
| Shin-Kiryū Station | 新桐生駅（しんきりゅう） |
| Shin-Kisogawa Station | 新木曽川駅（しんきそがわ） |
| Shin-Kiyosu Station | 新清洲駅（しんきよす） |
| Shin-Kōbe Station | 新神戸駅（しんこうべ） |
| Shin-Kodaira Station | 新小平駅（しんこだいら） |
| Shin-Kōenji Station | 新高円寺駅（しんこうえんじ） |
| Shin-Koga Station | 新古河駅（しんこが） |
| Shin-Koganei Station | 新小金井駅（しんこがねい） |
| Shin-Koiwa Station | 新小岩駅（しんこいわ） |
| Shin-Koshigaya Station | 新越谷駅（しんこしがや） |
| Shin-Kotoni Station | 新琴似駅（しんことに） |
| Shin-Kōshinzuka Station | 新庚申塚駅（しんこうしんづか） |
| Shin-Koyanose Station | 新木屋瀬駅（しんこやのせ） |
| Shin-Koyasu Station | 新子安駅（しんこやす） |
| Shin-Kurashiki Station | 新倉敷駅（しんくらしき） |
| Shin-Kurobe Station | 新黒部駅（しんくろべ） |
| Shinkyūdaigakumae Station | 鍼灸大学前駅（しんきゅうだいがくまえ） |
| Shinmachiguchi Station | 新町口駅（しんまちぐち） |
| Shin-Maebashi Station | 新前橋駅（しんまえばし） |
| Shin-Maiko Station | 新舞子駅（しんまいこ） |
| Shin-Maruko Station | 新丸子駅（しんまるこ） |
| Shin-Matsuda Station | 新松田駅（しんまつだ） |
| Shin-Matsudo Station | 新松戸駅（しんまつど） |
| Shin-Mikawashima Station | 新三河島駅（しんみかわしま） |
| Shin-Minamata Station | 新水俣駅（しんみなまた） |
| Shin-Misato Station | 新三郷駅（しんみさと） |
| Shin-Miyakawa Station | 新宮川駅（しんみやかわ） |
| Shin-Mobara Station | 新茂原駅（しんもばら） |
| Shin-Moriya Station | 新守谷駅（しんもりや） |
| Shin-Moriyama Station | 新守山駅（しんもりやま） |
| Shin-Nagata Station | 新長田駅（しんながた） |
| Shinnaka Station | 新那加駅（しんなか） |
| Shin-Nakano Station | 新中野駅（しんなかの） |
| Shin-Nanyō Station | 新南陽駅（しんなんよう） |
| Shin-Narashino Station | 新習志野駅（しんならしの） |
| Shin-Nihombashi Station | 新日本橋駅（しんにほんばし） |
| Shin-Nishikanazawa Station | 新西金沢駅（しんにしかなざわ） |
| Shin-Nishiwaki Station | 新西脇駅（しんにしわき） |
| Shinnittetsumae Station | 新日鉄前駅（しんにってつまえ） |
| Shinnyū Station | 新入駅（しんにゅう） |
| Shinobugaoka Station | 忍ヶ丘駅（しのぶがおか） |
| Shin-Ochanomizu Station | 新御茶ノ水駅（しんおちゃのみず） |
| Shinodayama Station | 信太山駅（しのだやま） |
| Shinohara Station (Kochi) | 篠原停留場（しのはら） |
| Shinohara Station (Shiga) | 篠原駅 (滋賀県)（しのはら） |
| Shin-Okachimachi Station | 新御徒町駅（しんおかちまち） |
| Shin-Onomichi Station | 新尾道駅（しんおのみち） |
| Shin-Ōhirashita Station | 新大平下駅（しんおおひらした） |
| Shin-Ōji Station | 新王寺駅（しんおうじ） |
| Shin-Ōkubo Station | 新大久保駅（しんおおくぼ） |
| Shinome Station | 篠目駅（しのめ） |
| Shinomiya Station | 四宮駅（しのみや） |
| Shin-Ōmiya Station | 新大宮駅（しんおおみや） |
| Shin-Ōmura Station | 新大村駅（しんおおむら） |
| Shin-Ōmuta Station | 新大牟田駅（しんおおむた） |
| Shinonoi Station | 篠ノ井駅（しののい） |
| Shinonome Station (Kyoto) | 東雲駅 (京都府)（しののめ） |
| Shinonome Station (Tokyo) | 東雲駅 (東京都)（しののめ） |
| Shinoro Station | 篠路駅（しのろ） |
| Shin-Ōsaka Station | 新大阪駅（しんおおさか） |
| Shin-Otanoshike Station | 新大楽毛駅（しんおたのしけ） |
| Shin-Otaru Station | 新小樽駅（しんおたる） |
| Shin-Ōtsu Station | 新大津駅（しんおおつ） |
| Shin-Ōtsuka Station | 新大塚駅（しんおおつか） |
| Shinozaki Station | 篠崎駅（しのざき） |
| Shinozuka Station | 篠塚駅（しのづか） |
| Shin-Rifu Station | 新利府駅（しんりふ） |
| Shinrinkōen Station (Hokkaidō) | 森林公園駅 (北海道)（しんりんこうえん） |
| Shinrinkōen Station (Saitama) | 森林公園駅 (埼玉県)（しんりんこうえん） |
| Shinsaibashi Station | 心斎橋駅（しんさいばし） |
| Shin-Sakaemachi Station (Aichi) | 新栄町駅 (愛知県)（しんさかえまち） |
| Shin-Sakaemachi Station (Fukuoka) | 新栄町駅 (福岡県)（しんさかえまち） |
| Shin-Sakaeno Station | 新栄野駅（しんさかえの） |
| Shin-Sakuradai Station | 新桜台駅（しんさくらだい） |
| Shin-Sanda Station | 新三田駅（しんさんだ） |
| Shin-Sapporo Station (Sapporo City Subway) | 新さっぽろ駅（しんさっぽろ） |
| Shin-Sapporo Station (JR Hokkaido) | 新札幌駅（しんさっぽろ） |
| Shin-Sayama Station | 新狭山駅（しんさやま） |
| Shin Seibijō Station | 新整備場駅（しんせいびじょう） |
| Shinseki Station | 新関駅（しんせき） |
| Shinsen Station | 神泉駅（しんせん） |
| Shinsen Ikebukuro Station | 新線池袋駅（しんせんいけぶくろ） |
| Shinsen Shinjuku Station | 新線新宿駅（しんせんしんじゅく） |
| Shin-Seto Station | 新瀬戸駅（しんせと） |
| Shin-Shibamata Station | 新柴又駅（しんしばまた） |
| Shin-Shibaura Station | 新芝浦駅（しんしばうら） |
| Shin-Shimashima Station | 新島々駅（しんしましま） |
| Shin-Shimizu Station | 新清水駅（しんしみず） |
| Shin-Shimonoseki Station | 新下関駅（しんしものせき） |
| Shin-Shirakawa Station | 新白河駅（しんしらかわ） |
| Shinshiraoka Station | 新白岡駅（しんしらおか） |
| Shinshiro Station | 新城駅（しんしろ） |
| Shin-Shizuoka Station | 新静岡駅（しんしずおか） |
| Shinshō Station | 新正駅（しんしょう） |
| Shinshū-Nakano Station | 信州中野駅（しんしゅうなかの） |
| Shin-Sugita Station | 新杉田駅（しんすぎた） |
| Shin-Suizenji Station | 新水前寺駅（しんすいぜんじ） |
| Shin-Suya Station | 新須屋駅（しんすや） |
| Shin-Takahama Station | 新高浜駅（しんたかはま） |
| Shin-Takaoka Station | 新高岡駅（しんたかおか） |
| Shin-Takashima Station | 新高島駅（しんたかしま） |
| Shin-Takashimadaira Station | 新高島平駅（しんたかしまだいら） |
| Shin-Takatoku Station | 新高徳駅（しんたかとく） |
| Shin-Tamana Station | 新玉名駅（しんたまな） |
| Shin-Tanabe Station | 新田辺駅（しんたなべ） |
| Shin-Tarō Station | 新田老駅（しんたろう） |
| Shintetsu Dōjō Station | 神鉄道場駅（しんてつどうじょう） |
| Shintetsu Rokkō Station | 神鉄六甲駅（しんてつろっこう） |
| Shin-Tochigi Station | 新栃木駅（しんとちぎ） |
| Shin-Tokorozawa Station | 新所沢駅（しんところざわ） |
| Shintoku Station | 新得駅（しんとく） |
| Shintomichō Station (Tokyo) | 新富町駅（しんとみちょう） |
| Shintomichō Station (Toyama) | 新富町停留場（しんとみちょう） |
| Shin-Toride Station | 新取手駅（しんとりで） |
| Shin-Tosu Station | 新鳥栖駅（しんとす） |
| Shin-Totsukawa Station | 新十津川駅（しんとつかわ） |
| Shin-Toyamaguchi Station | 新富山口駅（しんとやまぐち） |
| Shin-Toyohashi Station | 新豊橋駅（しんとよはし） |
| Shin-Toyosu Station | 新豊洲駅（しんとよす） |
| Shin-Toyota Station | 新豊田駅（しんとよた） |
| Shin-Toyotsu Station | 新豊津駅（しんとよつ） |
| Shin-Tsudanuma Station | 新津田沼駅（しんつだぬま） |
| Shin-tsunashima Station | 新綱島駅（しんつなしま） |
| Shin-Tsuruba Station | 新鶴羽駅（しんつるば） |
| Shin-Unuma Station | 新鵜沼駅（しんうぬま） |
| Shin-Uozu Station | 新魚津駅（しんうおづ） |
| Shin-Urayasu Station | 新浦安駅（しんうらやす） |
| Shin-Uwagoromo Station | 新上挙母駅（しんうわごろも） |
| Shin-Yahashira Station | 新八柱駅（しんやはしら） |
| Shin-Yakumo Station | 新八雲駅（しんやくも） |
| Shin-Yamaguchi Station | 新山口駅（しんやまぐち） |
| Shin-Yatsushiro Station | 新八代駅（しんやつしろ） |
| Shin-Yokohama Station | 新横浜駅（しんよこはま） |
| Shin-Yoshino Station | 新吉野駅（しんよしの） |
| Shin-Yōkaichi Station | 新八日市駅（しんようかいち） |
| Shin-Yūbari Station | 新夕張駅（しんゆうばり） |
| Shin-Yurigaoka Station | 新百合ヶ丘駅（しんゆりがおか） |
| Shinza Station | しんざ駅 |
| Shinzaike Station | 新在家駅（しんざいけ） |
| Shinzō-kekkan Center Station | 心臓血管センター駅（しんぞうけっかんセンター） |

=== Shio-Shu ===
| Shiodamachi Station | 塩田町駅（しおだまち） |
| Shiodome Station | 汐留駅（しおどめ） |
| Shiogama Station | 塩釜駅（しおがま） |
| Shiogamaguchi Station | 塩釜口駅（しおがまぐち） |
| Shiogō Station | 塩郷駅（しおごう） |
| Shiohama Station | 塩浜駅（しおはま） |
| Shioiri Station (Kagawa) | 塩入駅（しおいり） |
| Shioiri Station (Kanagawa) | 汐入駅（しおいり） |
| Shiojiri Station | 塩尻駅（しおじり） |
| Shiokari Station | 塩狩駅（しおかり） |
| Shiokawa Station | 塩川駅（しおかわ） |
| Shiomachi Station | 塩町駅（しおまち） |
| Shiomi Station (Hokkaido) | 汐見駅（しおみ） |
| Shiomi Station (Tokyo) | 潮見駅（しおみ） |
| Shiomibashi Station | 汐見橋駅（しおみばし） |
| Shionomiya Station | 汐ノ宮駅（しおのみや） |
| Shionosawa Station | 塩之沢駅（しおのさわ） |
| Shiotsu Station | 四方津駅（しおつ） |
| Shiotsuka Station | 塩塚駅（しおつか） |
| Shioya Station (Hokkaido) | 塩谷駅（しおや） |
| Shioya Station (Hyogo) | 塩屋駅 (兵庫県)（しおや） |
| Shioya Station (Kagawa) | 塩屋駅 (香川県)（しおや） |
| Shiozaki Station | 塩崎駅（しおざき） |
| Shiozawa Station | 塩沢駅（しおざわ） |
| Shippō Station | 七宝駅（しっぽう） |
| Shirahama Station | 白浜駅（しらはま） |
| Shirahamanomiya Station | 白浜の宮駅（しらはまのみや） |
| Shiraichi Station | 白市駅（しらいち） |
| Shiraikaigan Station | 白井海岸駅（しらいかいがん） |
| Shiraitodai Station | 白糸台駅（しらいとだい） |
| Shirakamidake-Tozanguchi Station | 白神岳登山口駅（しらかみだけとざんぐち） |
| Shirakawa Station | 白河駅（しらかわ） |
| Shirakawaguchi Station | 白川口駅（しらかわぐち） |
| Shiraki Station | 白木駅（しらき） |
| Shirakibaru Station | 白木原駅（しらきばる） |
| Shirakiyama Station | 白木山駅（しらきやま） |
| Shiraniwadai Station | 白庭台駅（しらにわだい） |
| Shiranuka Station | 白糠駅（しらぬか） |
| Shiraoi Station | 白老駅（しらおい） |
| Shiraoka Station | 白岡駅（しらおか） |
| Shirasagi Station | 白鷺駅（しらさぎ） |
| Shirasaka Station | 白坂駅（しらさか） |
| Shirasawa Station (Aichi) | 白沢駅 (愛知県)（しらさわ） |
| Shirasawa Station (Akita) | 白沢駅 (秋田県)（しらさわ） |
| Shirasawa Station (Kagoshima) | 白沢駅 (鹿児島県)（しらさわ） |
| Shirasawa-keikoku Station | 白沢渓谷駅（しらさわけいこく） |
| Shirataki Station | 白滝駅（しらたき） |
| Shiratsuka Station | 白塚駅（しらつか） |
| Shirayama Station | 白山駅 (香川県)（しらやま） |
| Shiretoko-Shari Station | 知床斜里駅（しれとこしゃり） |
| Shiriuchi Station | 知内駅（しりうち） |
| Shirōgahara Station | 四郎ヶ原駅（しろうがはら） |
| Shirogane Station | 白銀駅（しろがね） |
| Shiroi Station | 白井駅（しろい） |
| Shiroishi Station (Kumamoto) | 白石駅 (熊本県)（しろいし） |
| Shiroishi Station (Miyagi) | 白石駅 (宮城県)（しろいし） |
| Shiroishi Station (JR Hokkaidō) | 白石駅 (JR北海道)（しろいし） |
| Shiroishi Station (Sapporo Subway) | 白石駅 (札幌市営地下鉄)（しろいし） |
| Shiroishi-Zaō Station | 白石蔵王駅（しろいしざおう） |
| Shirokanedai Station | 白金台駅（しろかねだい） |
| Shirokane-Takanawa Station | 白金高輪駅（しろかねたかなわ） |
| Shirokitakōendōri Station | 城北公園通駅（しろきたこうえんどおり） |
| Shiroko Station | 白子駅（しろこ） |
| Shiroku Station | 白久駅（しろく） |
| Shiromaru Station | 白丸駅 (東京都)（しろまる） |
| Shiromigaoka Station | 城見ヶ丘駅（しろみがおか） |
| Shironishi Station | 城西駅（しろにし） |
| Shiroshita Station | 城下駅（しろした） |
| Shiroshita Station (Okayama) | 城下停留場（しろした） |
| Shirotori-Kōgen Station | 白鳥高原駅（しろとりこうえん） |
| Shirousagi Station | 白兎駅（しろうさぎ） |
| Shishibu Station | ししぶ駅（ししぶ） |
| Shishido Station | 宍戸駅（ししど） |
| Shishikui Station | 宍喰駅（ししくい） |
| Shishiorikarakuwa Station | 鹿折唐桑駅（ししおりからくわ） |
| Shisho Station | 四所駅（ししょ） |
| Shisui Station | 酒々井駅（しすい） |
| Shitadan Station | 下段駅（しただん） |
| Shitanoe Station | 下ノ江駅（したのえ） |
| Shitayama Station | 舌山駅（したやま） |
| Shiteguri Station | 為栗駅（してぐり） |
| Shitennōji-mae Yūhigaoka Station | 四天王寺前夕陽ヶ丘駅（してんのうじまえゆうひがおか） |
| Shitte Station | 尻手駅（しって） |
| Shitte Station (Ibaraki) | 知手駅（しって） |
| Shiwachi Station | 志和地駅（しわち） |
| Shiwa-Chūō Station | 紫波中央駅（しわちゅうおう） |
| Shiwaguchi Station | 志和口駅（しわぐち） |
| Shiyakusho Station | 市役所駅（しやくしょ） |
| Shiyakusho-mae Station (Aichi) | 市役所前停留場 (愛知県)（しやくしょまえ） |
| Shiyakusho-mae Station (Chiba) | 市役所前駅 (千葉県)（しやくしょまえ） |
| Shiyakusho-mae Station (Ehime) | 市役所前停留場 (愛媛県)（しやくしょまえ） |
| Shiyakusho-mae Station (Hiroshima) | 市役所前駅 (広島県)（しやくしょまえ） |
| Shiyakusho-mae Station (Hokkaido) | 市役所前停留場 (北海道)（しやくしょまえ） |
| Shiyakusho-mae Station (Kagoshima) | 市役所前停留場 (鹿児島県)（しやくしょまえ） |
| Shiyakusho-mae Station (Nagano) | 市役所前駅 (長野県)（しやくしょまえ） |
| Shiyakusho-mae Station (Wakayama) | 市役所前駅 (和歌山県)（しやくしょまえ） |
| Shizen'en-mae Station | 自然園前駅（しぜんえんまえ） |
| Shizu Station (Chiba) | 志津駅（しづ） |
| Shizu Station (Ibaraki) | 静駅（しず） |
| Shizugawa Station | 志津川駅（しづがわ） |
| Shizuhama Station | 清水浜駅（しずはま） |
| Shizukari Station | 静狩駅（しずかり） |
| Shizukuishi Station | 雫石駅（しずくいし） |
| Shizuma Station | 静間駅（しずま） |
| Shizumi Station | 志都美駅（しずみ） |
| Shizunai Station | 静内駅（しずない） |
| Shizuoka Station | 静岡駅（しずおか） |
| Shizuoka Freight Station | 静岡貨物駅（しずおかかもつ） |
| Shizuwa Station | 静和駅（しずわ） |
| Shobata Station | 勝幡駅（しょばた） |
| Shoro Station | 庶路駅（しょろ） |
| Shōbara Station | 荘原駅（しょうばら） |
| Shōden Station | 生田駅 (秋田県)（しょうでん） |
| Shōgunzan Station | 将軍山駅（しょうぐんざん） |
| Shōin-jinjamae Station | 松陰神社前駅（しょういんじんじゃまえ） |
| Shōjaku Station | 正雀駅（しょうじゃく） |
| Shōji Station (Osaka, Osaka) | 小路駅（しょうじ） |
| Shōji Station (Toyonaka, Osaka) | 少路駅（しょうじ） |
| Shoko Center-iriguchi Station | 商工センター入口駅（しょうこうせんたーいりぐち） |
| Shokokaigisho-mae Station | 商工会議所前駅（しょうこうかいぎしょまえ） |
| Shōmaru Station | 正丸駅（しょうまる） |
| Shōnai Station (Oita) | 庄内駅 (大分県)（しょうない） |
| Shōnai Station (Osaka) | 庄内駅 (大阪府)（しょうない） |
| Shōnai-dōri Station | 庄内通駅（しょうないどおり） |
| Shōnai-Ryokuchikōen Station | 庄内緑地公園駅（しょうないりょくちこうえん） |
| Shōnan Station | 沼南駅（しょうなん） |
| Shōnan-Enoshima Station | 湘南江の島駅（しょうなんえのしま） |
| Shōnandai Station | 湘南台駅（しょうなんだい） |
| Shōnan-Fukasawa Station | 湘南深沢駅（しょうなんふかさわ） |
| Shōnan-kaigan-kōen Station | 湘南海岸公園駅（しょうなんかいがんこうえん） |
| Shōnan-Machiya Station | 湘南町屋駅（しょうなんまちや） |
| Shōtenkyō Station | 小天橋駅（しょうてんきょう） |
| Shōwa Station (Kanagawa) | 昭和駅（しょうわ） |
| Shōwachō Station (Kagawa) | 昭和町駅 (香川県)（しょうわちょう） |
| Shōwachō Station (Osaka) | 昭和町駅 (大阪府)（しょうわちょう） |
| Shōwajima Station | 昭和島駅（しょうわじま） |
| Shōwamachi Station | 昭和町駅 (愛知県)（しょうわまち） |
| Shōyama Station | 生山駅（しょうやま） |
| Shōzui Station | 勝瑞駅（しょうずい） |
| Shudaifuzoku-suzugamine-mae Station | 修大附属鈴峯前駅（しゅうだいふぞくすずがみねまえ） |
| Shūgakuin Station | 修学院駅（しゅうがくいん） |
| Shukugawa Station | 夙川駅（しゅくがわ） |
| Shukugawara Station (Aomori) | 宿川原駅（しゅくがわら） |
| Shukugawara Station (Kanagawa) | 宿河原駅（しゅくがわら） |
| Shukuin Station | 宿院駅（しゅくいん） |
| Shukunohe Station | 宿戸駅（しゅくのへ） |
| Shumombetsu Station | 朱文別駅（しゅもんべつ） |
| Shuntokumichi Station | 俊徳道駅（しゅんとくみち） |
| Shūrakuen Station | 聚楽園駅（しゅうらくえん） |
| Shuri Station | 首里駅（しゅり） |
| Shuuchi-Kasagami Station | 守内かさ神駅（しゅうちかさがみ） |
| Shuzenji Station | 修善寺駅（しゅぜんじ） |

=== So-Su ===
| Sobanokami Station | 曽波神駅（そばのかみ） |
| Sōbudaimae Station | 相武台前駅（そうぶだいまえ） |
| Sōbudaishita Station | 相武台下駅（そうぶだいした） |
| Socio Distribution Center Station | ソシオ流通センター駅（ソシオりゅうつうセンター） |
| Sodani Station | 曽谷駅（そだに） |
| Sodegaura Station | 袖ヶ浦駅（そでがうら） |
| Sodesaki Station | 袖崎駅（そでさき） |
| Sōdō Station | 宗道駅（そうどう） |
| Soeda Station | 添田駅（そえだ） |
| Sōen Station | 桑園駅（そうえん） |
| Soga Station | 蘇我駅（そが） |
| Sōgo Station | 寒河駅（そうご） |
| Sōgosandō Station | 宗吾参道駅（そうごさんどう） |
| Sōgō Rihabiri Center Station | 総合リハビリセンター駅（そうごうりはびりせんたー） |
| Sōgōundōkōen Station | 総合運動公園駅（そうごううんどうこうえん） |
| Sohara Station (Gifu) | 蘇原駅（そはら） |
| Sohara Station (Mie) | 楚原駅（そはら） |
| Sōja Station | 総社駅（そうじゃ） |
| Sōjiji Station | 総持寺駅（そうじじ） |
| Sōjōdaigakumae Station | 崇城大学前駅（そうじょうだいがくまえ） |
| Sōka Station | 草加駅（そうか） |
| Sokei Station | 磯鶏駅（そけい） |
| Sōma Station | 相馬駅（そうま） |
| Sone Station (Hyogo) | 曽根駅 (兵庫県)（そね） |
| Sone Station (Osaka) | 曽根駅 (大阪府)（そね） |
| Soneda Station | 曽根田駅（そねだ） |
| Sono Station | 園駅（その） |
| Sonobe Station | 園部駅（そのべ） |
| Sonoda Station | 園田駅（そのだ） |
| Sonogi Station | 彼杵駅（そのぎ） |
| Sōri Station | 沢入駅（そうり） |
| Sosanji Station | 曽山寺駅（そさんじ） |
| Soshigaya-Ōkura Station | 祖師ヶ谷大蔵駅（そしがやおおくら） |
| Sōtarō Station | 宗太郎駅（そうたろう） |
| Sōunnosato-Ebara Station | 早雲の里荏原駅（そううんのさとえばら） |
| Sōunzan Station | 早雲山駅（そううんざん） |
| Sōzenji Station | 崇禅寺駅（そうぜんじ） |
| Space World Station | スペースワールド駅 |
| Sports Center Station | スポーツセンター駅 |
| Sports Kōen Station | スポーツ公園駅（スポーツこうえん） |
| St. Mary's Hospital Station | 聖マリア病院前駅（せいまりあびょういんまえ） |
| Suda Station | 隅田駅（すだ） |
| Sudo Station | 須津駅（すど） |
| Sue Station (Fukuoka) | 須恵駅（すえ） |
| Sue Station (Kagawa) | 陶駅（すえ） |
| Sue-Chūō Station | 須恵中央駅（すえちゅうおう） |
| Suehiro Station | 末広駅（すえひろ） |
| Suehirochō Station (Hokkaido) | 末広町停留場 (北海道)（すえひろちょう） |
| Suehirochō Station (Kanagawa) | 末広町駅 (神奈川県)（すえひろちょう） |
| Suehirochō Station (Tokyo) | 末広町駅 (東京都)（すえひろちょう） |
| Suehirochō Station (Toyama) | 末広町駅 (富山県)（すえひろちょう） |
| Suenohara Station | 末野原駅（すえのはら） |
| Suetachibana Station | すえたちばな駅（すえたちばな） |
| Suetsugi Station | 末続駅（すえつぎ） |
| Suetsune Station | 末恒駅（すえつね） |
| Sufu Station | 周布駅（すふ） |
| Sugamo Station | 巣鴨駅（すがも） |
| Sugamo-Shinden Station | 巣鴨新田駅（すがもしんでん） |
| Sugano Station | 菅野駅（すがの） |
| Sugao Station | 菅尾駅（すがお） |
| Sugaya Station | 菅谷駅（すがや） |
| Sugihara Station | 杉原駅（すぎはら） |
| Sugihashi Station | 杉橋駅（すぎはし） |
| Sugikawachi Station | 杉河内駅（すぎかわち） |
| Sugimotochō Station | 杉本町駅（すぎもとちょう） |
| Sugisaki Station | 杉崎駅（すぎさき） |
| Sugita Station (Fukushima) | 杉田駅 (福島県)（すぎた） |
| Sugita Station (Kanagawa) | 杉田駅 (神奈川県)（すぎた） |
| Sugito-Takanodai Station | 杉戸高野台駅（すぎとたかのだい） |
| Sugiyama Station | 杉山駅（すぎやま） |
| Sugo Station | 巣子駅（すご） |
| Suhara Station (Gifu) | 洲原駅（すはら） |
| Suhara Station (Nagano) | 須原駅（すはら） |
| Suibara Station | 水原駅（すいばら） |
| Suidōbashi Station | 水道橋駅（すいどうばし） |
| Suidōchō Station | 水道町駅（すいどうちょう） |
| Suigō Station | 水郷駅（すいごう） |
| Suita Station (JR West) | 吹田駅 (JR西日本)（すいた） |
| Suita Station (Hankyu) | 吹田駅 (阪急)（すいた） |
| Suitengūmae Station | 水天宮前駅（すいてんぐうまえ） |
| Suizenji Station | 水前寺駅（すいぜんじ） |
| Suizenjiekidōri Station | 水前寺駅通駅（すいぜんじえきどおり） |
| Suka Station | 須賀駅（すか） |
| Sukagawa Station | 須賀川駅（すかがわ） |
| Sukaguchi Station | 須ヶ口駅（すかぐち） |
| Sukenobu Station | 助信駅（すけのぶ） |
| Sukumo Station | 宿毛駅（すくも） |
| Suma Station | 須磨駅（すま） |
| Sumadera Station | 須磨寺駅（すまでら） |
| Suma-Kaihinkōen Station | 須磨海浜公園駅（すまかいひんこうえん） |
| Sumaurakōen Station | 須磨浦公園駅（すまうらこうえん） |
| Sumidagawa Station | 隅田川駅（すみだがわ） |
| Sumikawa Station | 澄川駅（すみかわ） |
| Suminodō Station | 住道駅（すみのどう） |
| Suminoe Station | 住ノ江駅（すみのえ） |
| Suminoekōen Station | 住之江公園駅（すみのえこうえん） |
| Sumiyoshi Station (JR West) | 住吉駅 (JR西日本・神戸新交通)（すみよし） |
| Sumiyoshi Station (Hanshin) | 住吉駅 (阪神)（すみよし） |
| Sumiyoshi Station (Kumamoto) | 住吉駅 (熊本県)（すみよし） |
| Sumiyoshi Station (Nagasaki) | 住吉停留場 (長崎県)（すみよし） |
| Sumiyoshi Station (Osaka) | 住吉停留場 (大阪府)（すみよし） |
| Sumiyoshi Station (Tokyo) | 住吉駅 (東京都)（すみよし） |
| Sumiyoshichō Station | 住吉町駅（すみよしちょう） |
| Sumiyoshidōri Station | 住吉通駅（すみよしどおり） |
| Sumiyoshi-Higashi Station | 住吉東駅（すみよしひがし） |
| Sumiyoshi-Kōen Station | 住吉公園駅（すみよしこうえん） |
| Sumiyoshi-Taisha Station | 住吉大社駅（すみよしたいしゃ） |
| Sumizome Station | 墨染駅（すみぞめ） |
| Sunadabashi Station | 砂田橋駅（すなだばし） |
| Sunagawa Station | 砂川駅（すながわ） |
| Sunagawa-Nanaban Station | 砂川七番駅（すながわななばん） |
| Sunami Station | 須波駅（すなみ） |
| Sundome Nishi Station | サンドーム西駅（さんどーむにし） |
| Sunza Station | 寸座駅（すんざ） |
| Suō-Hanaoka Station | 周防花岡駅（すおうはなおか） |
| Suō-Kubo Station | 周防久保駅（すおうくぼ） |
| Suō-Sayama Station | 周防佐山駅（すおうさやま） |
| Suō-Shimogō Station | 周防下郷駅（すおうしもごう） |
| Suō-Takamori Station | 周防高森駅（すおうたかもり） |
| Surisawa Station | 摺沢駅（すりさわ） |
| Suruga-Oyama Station | 駿河小山駅（するがおやま） |
| Suruga-Tokuyama Station | 駿河徳山駅（するがとくやま） |
| Susa Station | 須佐駅（すさ） |
| Susaki Station | 須崎駅（すさき） |
| Susami Station | 周参見駅（すさみ） |
| Susenji Station | 周船寺駅（すせんじ） |
| Susono Station | 裾野駅（すその） |
| Susukino Station | すすきの駅 |
| Suwa Station | 諏訪駅（すわ） |
| Suwachō Station | 諏訪町駅（すわちょう） |
| Suwanokawara Station | 諏訪川原駅（すわのかわら） |
| Suwanomori Station | 諏訪ノ森駅（すわのもり） |
| Suwanotaira Station | 諏訪ノ平駅（すわのたいら） |
| Suya Station | 須屋駅（すや） |
| Suzaka Station | 須坂駅（すざか） |
| Suzaki Station | 洲先駅（すざき） |
| Suzuka Circuit Inō Station | 鈴鹿サーキット稲生駅（すずかサーキットいのう） |
| Suzuka Station | 鈴鹿駅（すずか） |
| Suzukakedai Station | すずかけ台駅（すずかけだい） |
| Suzukashi Station | 鈴鹿市駅（すずかし） |
| Suzukichō Station | 鈴木町駅（すずきちょう） |
| Suzumeda Station | 雀田駅（すずめだ） |
| Suzumenomiya Station | 雀宮駅（すずめのみや） |
| Suzurandai Station | 鈴蘭台駅（すずらんだい） |
| Suzurandai-Nishiguchi Station | 鈴蘭台西口駅（すずらんだいにしぐち） |
| Suzurannosato Station | すずらんの里駅（すずらんのさと） |
