= Tarumi Station (Hyōgo) =

Railway station in Kobe, Japan

Tarumi Station 垂水駅
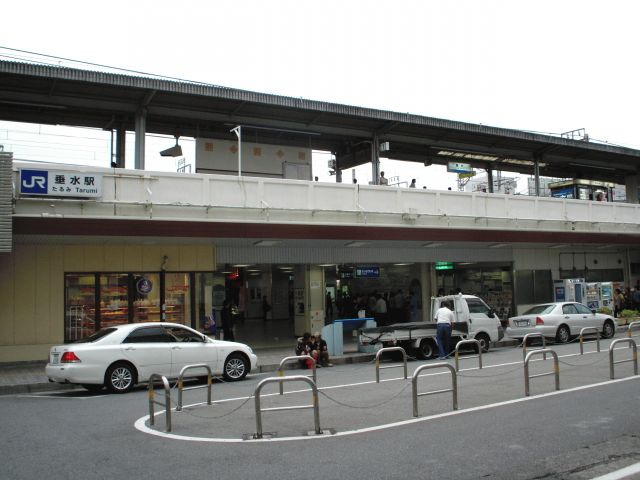
- Tarumi Station, October 2007

General information
- Location: 1-20 Kanda-cho,ō, Tarumi-ku, Kobe-shi, Hyōgo-ken; Japan
- Coordinates: 34°37′45″N 135°03′14″E
- Owner: West Japan Railway Company
- Operator: West Japan Railway Company
- Line: San'yō Main Line
- Distance: 13.1 km (8.1 miles) from Kobe
- Platforms: 2 side platforms
- Connections: Bus stop

Construction
- Structure type: Elevated
- Accessible: Yes

Other information
- Status: Staffed ( Midori no Madoguchi )
- Station code: JR-A70
- Website: Official website

History
- Opened: 1 July 1888

Passengers
- FY2019: 31,948 daily
Location
- Location within Hyōgo Prefecture Location within Japan

Tarumi Station (垂水駅, Tarumi-eki) is a passenger railway station located in Tarumi-ku, Kobe, Hyōgo Prefecture, Japan, operated by the West Japan Railway Company (JR West).

== Lines ==
Tarumi Station is served by the JR San'yō Main Line (also referred to as the JR Kobe Line), and is located 13.1 kilometers from the terminus of the line at Kobe and 46.2 kilometers from Osaka.

== Station layout ==
The station consists of two opposed elevated side platforms and two tracks with the station building underneath. There are an additional two bypass tracks which allows Special Rapid train service to bypass the station. The station has a Midori no Madoguchi staffed ticket office.

=== Platforms ===
1	■ JR Kobe Line	for Nishi-Akashi and Himeji
2	■ JR Kobe Line	for Sannomiya, Amagasaki, and Osaka

== Adjacent stations ==
«	Service	»
JR West
Sanyō Main Line (JR Kobe Line)
Special Rapid Service: Does not stop at this station
Rapid Service (on the express track): Does not stop at this station
Suma	Rapid Service (on the transit track)	Maiko
Shioya	Local	Maiko

== History ==
Tarumi Station opened on 1 July 1888. With the privatization of the Japan National Railways (JNR) on 1 April 1987, the station came under the aegis of the West Japan Railway Company.

Station numbering was introduced in March 2018 with Tarumi being assigned station number JR-A70.

== Passenger statistics ==
In fiscal 2019, the station was used by an average of 31,948 passengers daily

== Surrounding area ==
- Sanyo Tarumi Station (Sanyo Electric Railway Main Line)
- Tarumi Ward office
- Taurmi Library
- Tarumi Fishing Port

== See also ==
- List of railway stations in Japan
