= Sanyo-Shioya Station =

Railway station in Kobe, Japan

Sanyo-Shioya Station 山陽塩屋駅
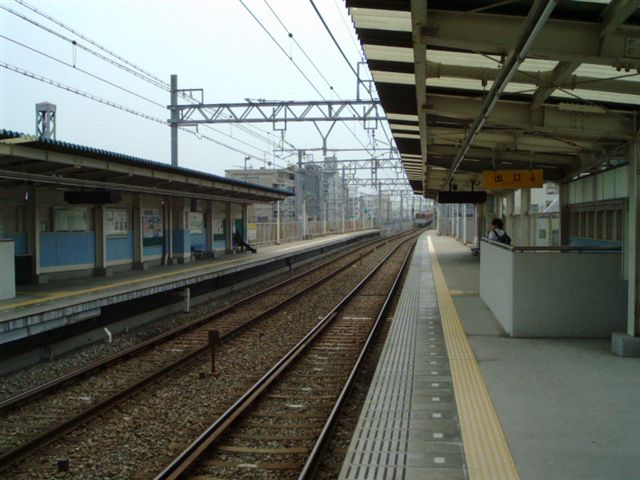
- Sanyo-Shioya Station, February 2021

General information
- Location: 1-chōme-2 Shioyachō, Tarumi-ku, Kobe-shi, Hyōgo-ken 655-0872; Japan
- Coordinates: 34.6334°N 135.0825°E
- Operator: Sanyo Electric Railway
- Line: ■ Main Line
- Distance: 6.8 km from Nishidai
- Platforms: 2 side platforms
- Connections

Other information
- Station code: SY08
- Website: Official website

History
- Opened: 11 May 1913
- Former names: Shioya (to 1943); Dentetsu-Shioya (to 1991)

Passengers
- FY2019: 805 (boarding only)
Location
- Location within Hyōgo Prefecture Location within Japan

Sanyo-Shioya Station (山陽塩屋駅, Sanyo Shioya-eki) is a passenger railway station located in Tarumi-ku, Kobe, Hyōgo Prefecture, Japan, operated by the private Sanyo Electric Railway.

== Lines ==
Sanyo-Shioya Station is served by the Sanyo Electric Railway Main Line and is 6.8 kilometers from the terminus of the line at Nishidai.

== Station layout ==
The station consists of two elevated side platforms with the station building underneath. The station is unattended.

=== Platforms ===
sea side	■ Main Line	for Sanyo-Akashi, Sanyo-Himeji and Sanyo-Aboshi
mountain side	■ Main Line	for Sannomiya and Osaka

== Adjacent stations ==
«	Service	»
Sanyo Electric Railway
Sanyo Electric Railway Main Line
Limited Express: Does not stop at this station
S Limited Express: Does not stop at this station
Sumaura-kōen	Local	Takinochaya

== History ==
Sanyo-Shioya Station opened on May 11, 1913 as Shioya Station (塩屋駅). It was renamed Dentetsu-Shioya Station (電鉄塩屋駅) on November 20, 1943, and renamed to its present name on April 7, 1991

== Passenger statistics ==
In fiscal 2018, the station was used by an average of 805 passengers daily (boarding passengers only).

== Surrounding area ==
- JR Shioya Station
- Shioya Beach
- Mount James

== See also ==
- List of railway stations in Japan
