= Sumakaihinkōen Station =

Railway station in Kobe, Japan

Coordinates: 34°38′50″N 135°07′36″E

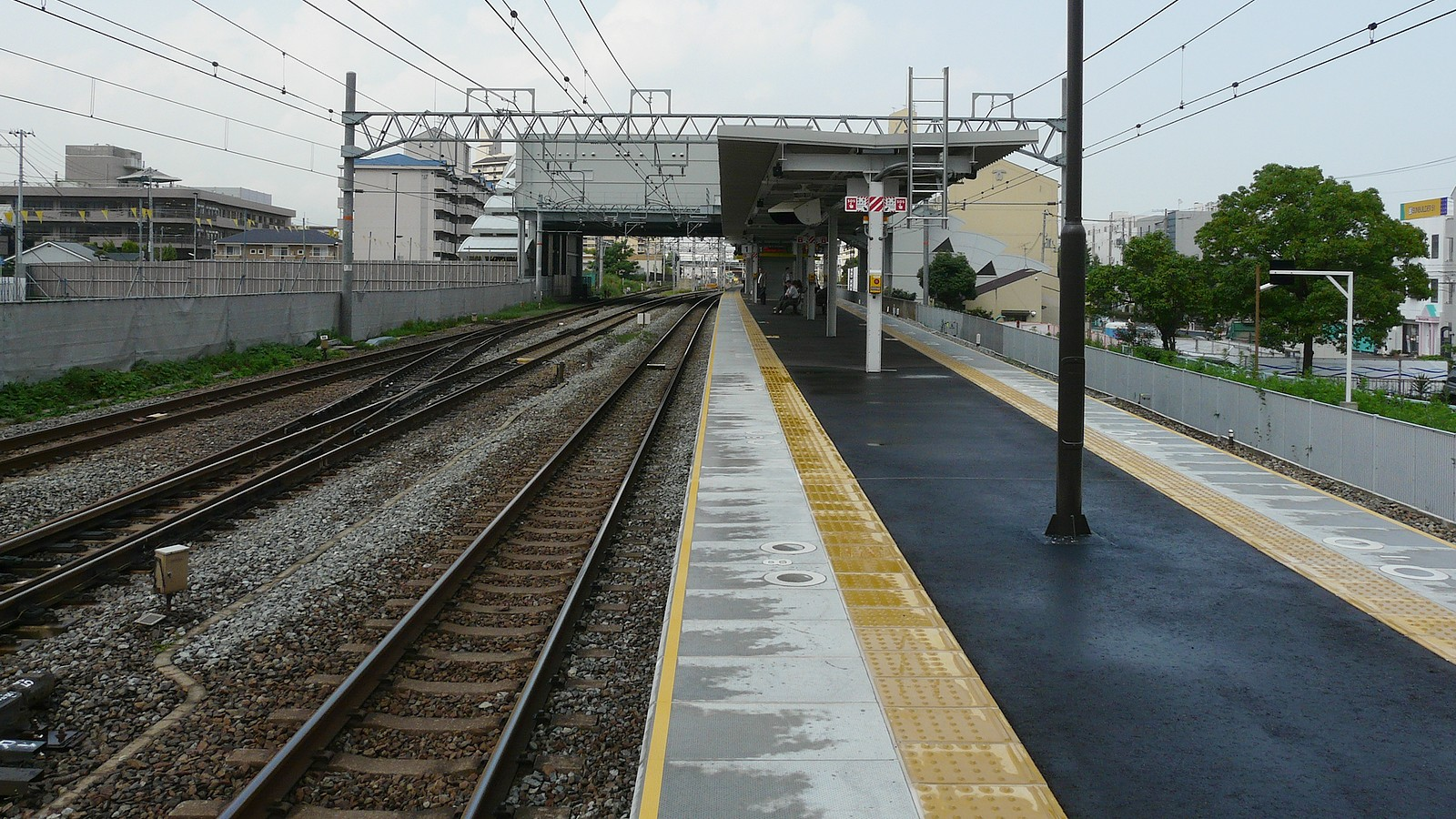
Suma Kaihin Koen Station

Sumakaihinkōen Station (須磨海浜公園駅, Sumakaihinkōen-eki) is a railway station on the West Japan Railway Company (JR West) Sanyō Main Line (JR Kobe Line) in Suma-ku, Kobe, Hyōgo Prefecture, Japan. Only local trains stop at this station.

== Layout ==
The station has one island platform serving two tracks, with two additional express tracks for Special Rapid Service (新快速, Shin-Kaisoku), express trains and freight trains bypassing the station.

=== Platforms ===
1	■ JR Kobe Line	for Sannomiya, Amagasaki, Osaka, and Kitashinchi
2	■ JR Kobe Line	for Nishi-Akashi and Kakogawa

== History ==
Sumakaihinkōen station opened on 15 March 2008.

Station numbering was introduced in March 2018 with Sumakaihinkōen being assigned station number JR-A67.

== Adjacent stations ==
«	Service	»
Sanyō Main Line (JR Kobe Line)
Rapid Service: Does not stop at this station
Special Rapid Service: Does not stop at this station
Takatori	Local	Suma
