= Suma Station =

Railway station in Kobe, Japan

Coordinates: 34°38′32″N 135°06′46″E

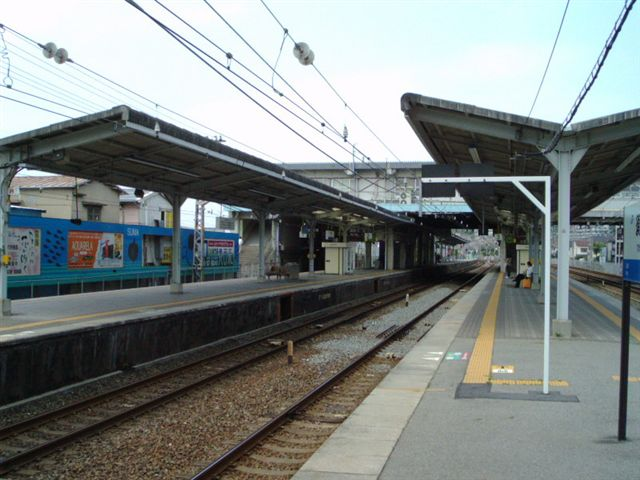
Platform of JR Suma Station

Suma Station (須磨駅, Suma-eki) is a railway station on the JR West San'yō Main Line (JR Kobe Line) in Suma-ku, Kobe, Hyōgo Prefecture, Japan.

JR Suma Station first opened on November 1, 1888 (Meiji 21). It was originally opened by the Sanyō Railway (山陽鉄道) when the railway between Hyōgo Station and Akashi Station began service. Suma Station opened simultaneously with that section of the line.

A pathway connects the station's south exit with the Suma beach on the Seto Inland Sea, while the Sanyo Electric Railway Suma Station is a short walk on the north side.

== Operation ==
The station consists of two island platforms serving a total of four local tracks, with two additional express tracks on the north side for passing trains. Rapid Service trains stop here but the Special Rapid train service runs on the express tracks, bypassing the station.

Layout

1	■ JR Kobe Line	for Nishi-Akashi and Himeji
2	■ JR Kobe Line	for Nishi-Akashi and Himeji (except off-peak hours) returning for Sannomiya, Amagasaki and Osaka and Kitashinchi
3, 4	■ JR Kobe Line	for Sannomiya, Amagasaki and Osaka

== Adjacent stations ==
«	Service	»
JR Kōbe Line
Special Rapid Service: Does not stop at this station
Rapid Service (on the express track): Does not stop at this station
Hyōgo	Rapid Service (on the transit track)	Tarumi
Sumakaihinkōen	Local	Shioya
