= Shimanoshita Station =

Railway station in Furano, Hokkaido, Japan

Coordinates: 43°22′29″N 142°21′03″E

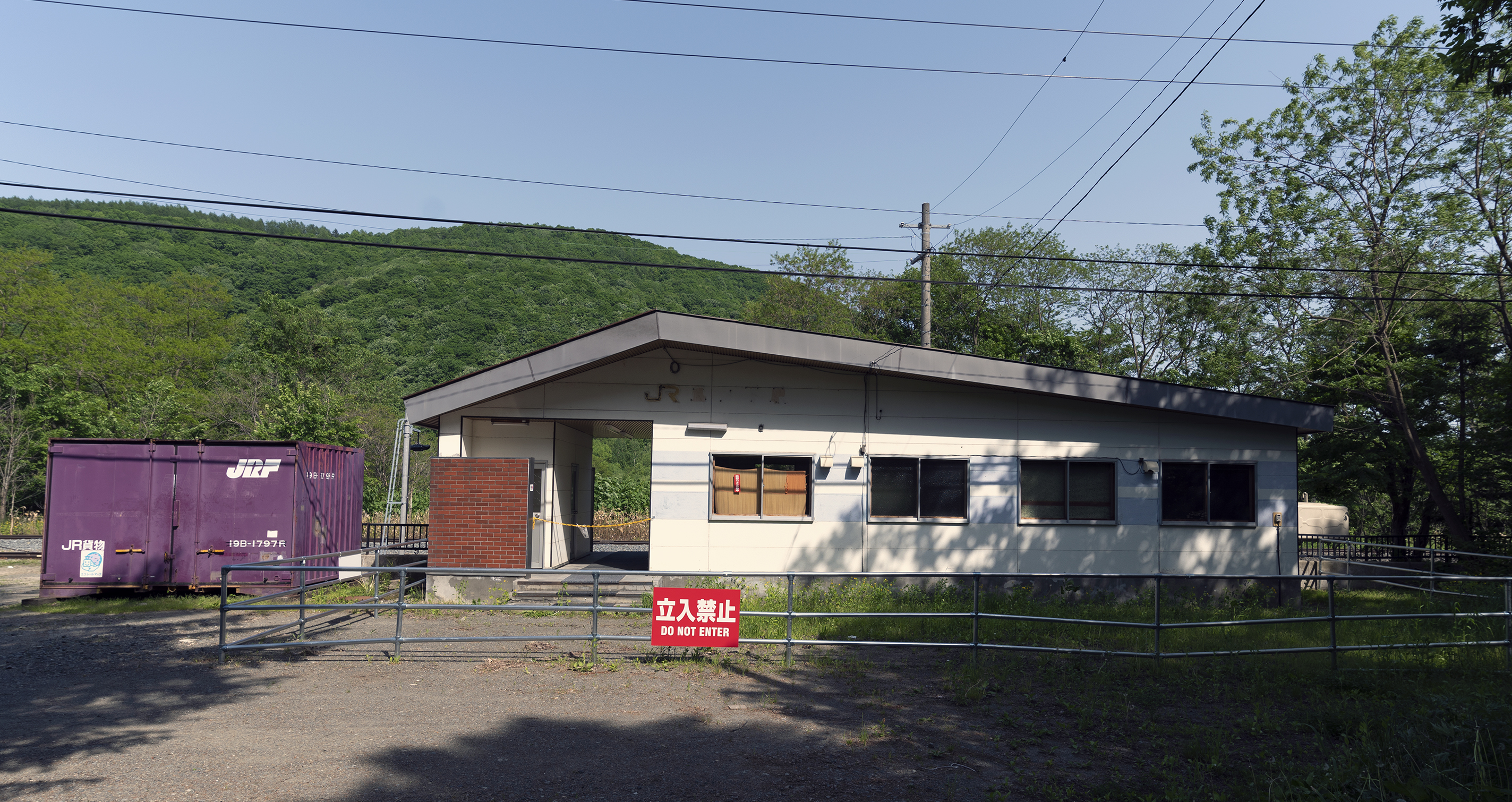
JR Shimanoshita station

Shimanoshita Station (島ノ下駅, Shimanoshita-eki) was a railway station on the Nemuro Main Line of JR Hokkaido located in Furano, Hokkaidō, Japan. The station opened on November 10, 1913. This station was permanently closed by the Hokkaido Railway Company (JR Hokkaido) on March 3, 2017.
