= Sumaura-kōen Station =

Railway station in Kobe, Japan

Sumaura-kōen Station 須磨浦公園駅
- Sumaura-kōen Station

General information
- Location: Suma-ku, Kobe, Hyōgo Prefecture, Japan
- Coordinates: 34°38′16″N 135°06′01″E
- Operator: Sanyo Electric Railway
- Line: Sanyo Electric Railway Main Line
Location
- Location within Japan

Sumaura-kōen Station (須磨浦公園駅, Sumaura-kōen-eki) is a train station in Suma-ku, Kobe, Hyōgo Prefecture, Japan.

== Adjacent stations ==
«	Service	»
Sanyo Electric Railway
Main Line
Sanyo Suma	Sanyo Local	Sanyo Shioya
Sanyo Suma	Hanshin Local	Terminus
Sanyo Suma	Hanshin Limited Express	Terminus
Sanyo S Limited Express: Does not stop at this station
Hanshin-Sanyo Limited Express: Does not stop at this station
