= Shiomi Station (Hokkaido) =

Railway station in Mukawa, Hokkaido, Japan

Coordinates: 42°33′01″N 141°56′43″E

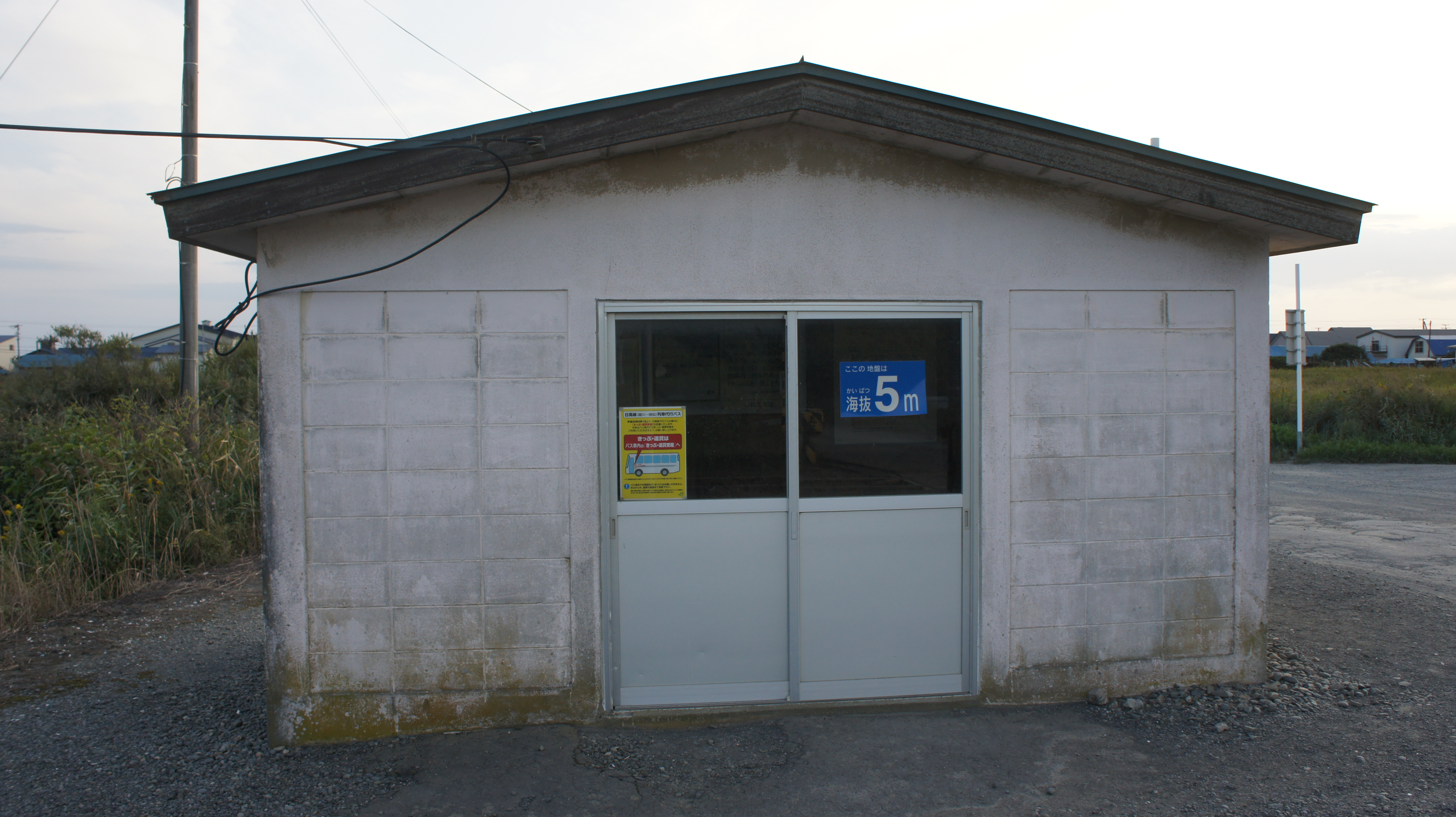
JR Hidaka-Main-Line, Shiomi Station Waiting Room

Shiomi Station (汐見駅, Shiomi-eki) was a railway station on the Hidaka Main Line in Mukawa, Hokkaido, Japan, operated by the Hokkaido Railway Company (JR Hokkaido).

Services on the 116 km section of the line between Mukawa and Samani have been suspended indefinitely since January 2015 due to storm damage.

== Adjacent stations ==
| « | Service | » |
Hidaka Main Line
| Mukawa | Local | Tomikawa |

== History ==
The station opened on 18 December 1959. With the privatization of Japanese National Railways (JNR) on 1 April 1987, the station came under the control of JR Hokkaido.

== See also ==
- List of railway stations in Japan
