= Semi-Onsen Station =

Railway station in Mogami, Yamagata Prefecture, Japan

Semi-Onsen Station 瀬見温泉駅
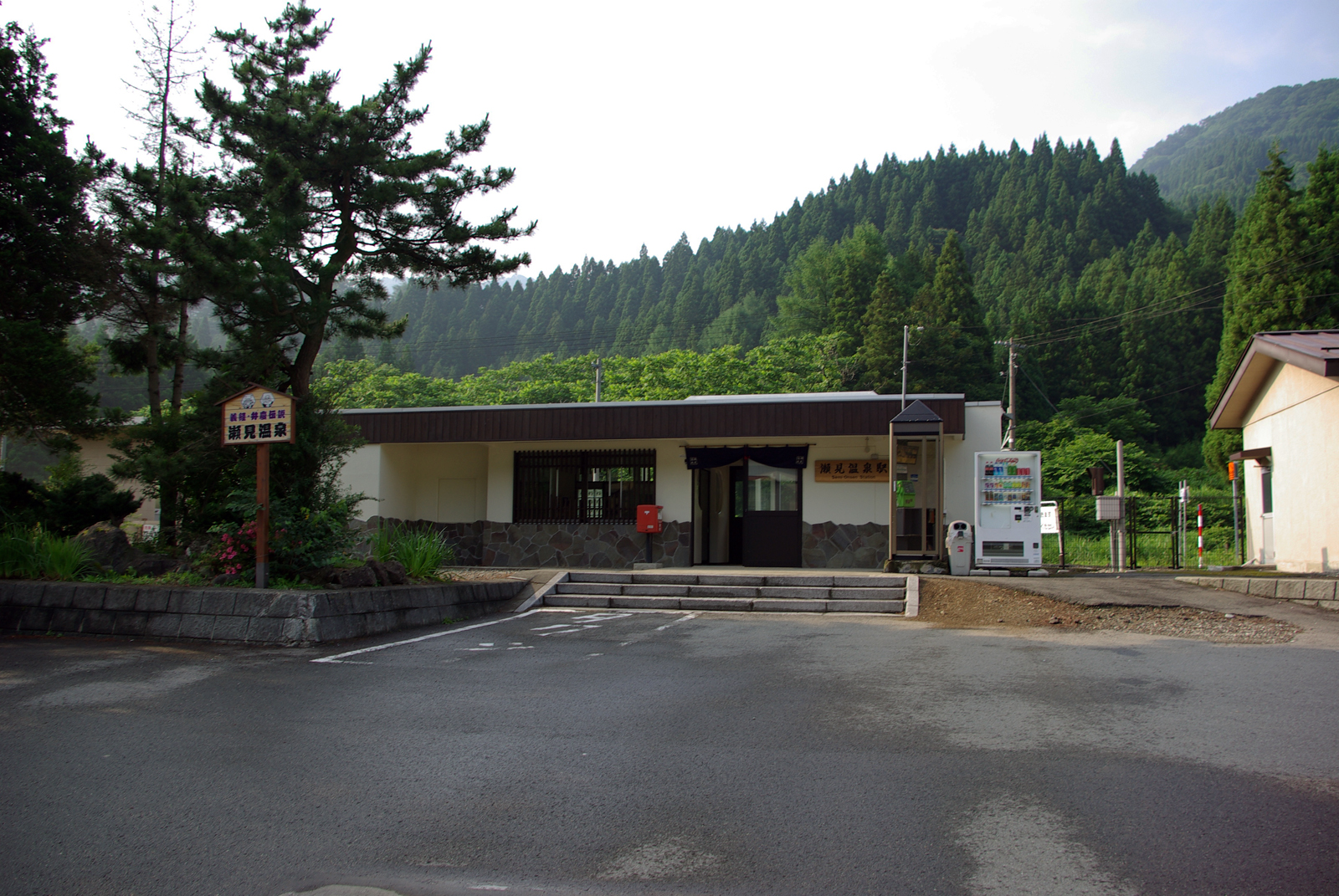
- Semi Onsen Station, July 2009

General information
- Location: Ohori, Mogami-machi, Mogami -gun, Yamagata-ken 999-6211; Japan
- Coordinates: 38.7552°N 140.4194°E
- Operator: JR East
- Line: ■ Rikuu East Line
- Distance: 75.0 kilometers from Kogota
- Platforms: 1 side platform

Other information
- Status: Unstaffed
- Website: Official website

History
- Opened: November 1, 1915
- Former names: Semi (until 1999)

Passengers
- FY2004: 47

Services
Preceding station	JR East	Following station
Higashi-Nagasawa towards Shinjō	Rikuu East Line	Usugi towards Kogota
Location
- Location within Yamagata Prefecture Location within Japan

Semi-Onsen Station (瀬見温泉駅, Semi-Onsen-eki) is a railway station in the town of Mogami, Yamagata, Japan, operated by the East Japan Railway Company (JR East).

== Lines ==
Semi-Onsen Station is served by the Rikuu East Line, and is located 75.0 rail kilometers from the terminus of the line at Kogota Station.

== Station layout ==
The station has one side platform, serving a bidirectional single track. The platform was formerly an island platform connected to the station building by a level crossing, but there is no longer a track on one side of the platform. The station is unattended.

== History ==
Semi-Onsen Station opened as Semi Station (瀬見駅, Semi-eki) on November 1, 1915. The station was absorbed into the JR East network upon the privatization of JNR on April 1, 1987. It was renamed to its present name on December 4, 1999.

== Surrounding area ==
- Semi Onsen
- Semi Post Office
- National Route 47
- Oguni River - A tributary of the Mogami River

== See also ==
- List of railway stations in Japan
