= Sanyo-Suma Station =

Railway station in Kobe, Japan

Sanyo-Suma 山陽須磨
- Sannyo-Suma Station, 2025

General information
- Location: Suma Ekimae, Japan National Route 2, Suma-ku, Kobe
- Coordinates: 34.6434298°N 135.1120949°E
- Operator: Sanyo Electric Railway
- Line: Sanyo Electric Railway Main Line
Tracks
1, 2	■ Main Line (westbound)	for Akashi, Himeji and Aboshi
3, 4	■ Main Line (eastbound)	for Kobe Sannomiya and Osaka
- Train operators: Kōbe Rapid Transit Railway, Hankyu Railway, Hanshin

Services
Main Line
Sumadera	Local	Sumaura-kōen
Sumadera	Hanshin Local	Sumaura-kōen
Sumadera	Hanshin Limited Express	Sumaura-kōen
Tsukimiyama	Sanyo S Limited Express	Takinochaya
Tukimiyama	Hanshin-Sanyo Limited Express (yellow marking)	Takinochaya (eastbound: first – morning) (westbound: evening – last); Sanyo-Tarumi (others)
Tsukimiyama	Hanshin-Sanyo Limited Express (red marking)	Takinochaya (eastbound: first – morning) (westbound: evening – last); Sanyo-Tarumi (others)
Location

Sanyo-Suma Station (山陽須磨駅, Sanyo Suma-eki) is a train station in Suma-ku, Kobe, Hyōgo Prefecture, Japan.

== History ==
A temporary station was opened here by the Hyogo Electric Tramway as Suma Terminal (須磨終点, Suma Shūten) on March 15, 1910. The permanent Suma Station opened in July 1912, in preparation for a westward extension to Ichinotani (a now-closed station between here and Sumaura-kōen) on July 11. The station was renamed Suma Ekimae Station (須磨駅前駅, Suma Ekimae Eki) (lit. 'The Station in front of (JGR) Suma Station) on April 12, 1917. On April 1, 1927, the railway was merged into the Ujigawa Electric Company, only to be sold off on June 6, 1933. Sanyō Electric Railway (nothing to do with the electronics company founded in 1950) renamed the station Dentetsu Suma Station (電鉄須磨駅, Dentetsu Suma Eki) (lit. Electric Railway [as opposed to the JGR line, which was not electrified until 1964] Suma Station) in 1943 and elevated the station in August 1947. Limited Expresses started calling here in September 1957, and the platforms were extended in November 1967. Due to the opening of the Kōbe Rapid Transit Railway on April 7, 1968, Hankyū and Hanshin trains start calling here. Exactly 23 years later, the station receives its current name. The station, like many others in the Kobe area, was closed in the aftermath of the Great Hanshin earthquake on January 17, 1995; services to Sumadera resumed on April 9 that year, followed ten days later by services to Sumaura-kōen.

== Lines ==
- Sanyo Electric Railway

- Sanyo Electric Railway Main Line

== Layout ==
The station building is on Japan National Route 2, at the Suma Ekimae (須磨駅前) (lit. in front of [either] Suma Station) intersection. From here a subway leads to two island platforms.

Ticket gates

Restroom

Platforms 1 and 2

Platforms 3 and 4

Signage

== Services ==
Trains run 0500-0015 every day. The typical hourly weekday off-peak service is:

- 6 trains to Hanshin Umeda, of which:
  - 2 are Hanshin-Sanyō Through Limited Expresses (calling at Tsukimiyama, Itayado, Kōsoku Nagata, Shinkaichi, Kōsoku Kōbe, Motomachi, Kobe Sannomiya, Mikage, Uozaki, Ashiya, Nishinomiya, Kōshien, Amagasaki and Umeda)
  - 4 are Hanshin-Sanyō Through Limited Expresses or Hanshin Limited Expresses running local until Kobe Sannomiya (calling at all stations until Kobe Sannomiya, then Mikage, Uozaki, Ashiya, Nishinomiya, Kōshien, Amagasaki and Umeda)
- 2 local trains to Hankyū Sannomiya
- 8 trains to Sanyō Himeji, of which:
  - 4 are Hanshin-Sanyō Through Limited Expresses (calling at Tarumi, Maiko-kōen, Akashi, Higashi-Futami, Takasago, Ōshio, Shikama and Himeji)
  - 4 are local (these trains are overtaken at Kasumigaoka)
- 2 trains to Sumaura-kōen only
