= Soneda Station =

Railway station in Fukushima, Fukushima Prefecture, Japan

Soneda Station 曽根田駅
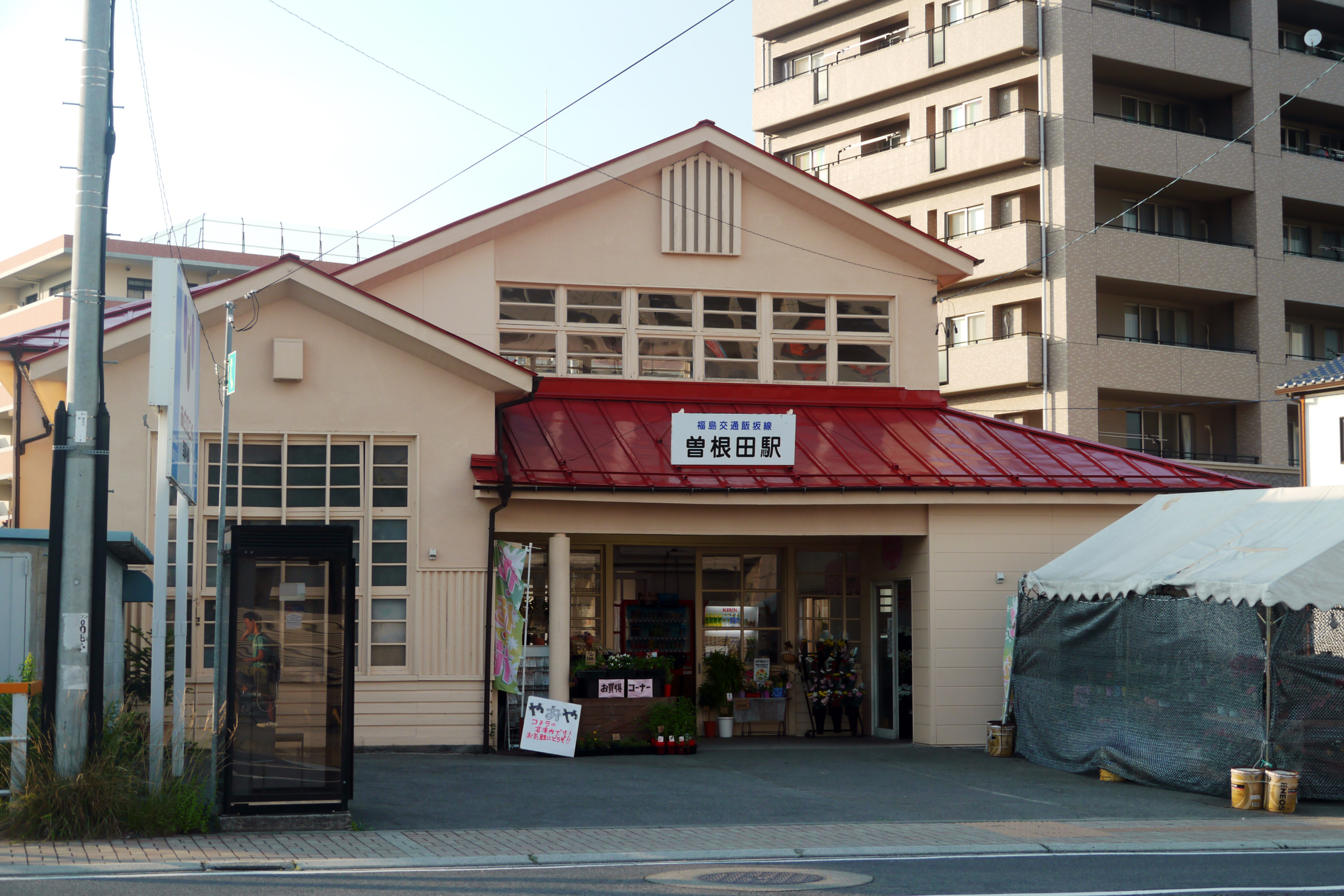
- Soneda Station in March 2011

General information
- Location: 3-37, Soneda-cho; Fukushima; Japan
- Coordinates: 37°45′37″N 140°27′34″E
- Operator: Fukushima Transportation
- Distance: 0.6 km (0.37 mi) from Fukushima
- Platforms: 1 side platform
- Tracks: 1
- Connections: Bus stop

Construction
- Structure type: At-grade

Other information
- Status: Staffed
- Website: Official website

History
- Opened: 13 April 1924
- Former names: Soneda (1924–1943); Dentetsu Fukushima (1943–1962)

Services
Preceding station	Fukushima Transportation	Following station
Fukushima Terminus	Iizaka Line	Bijutsukantoshokanmae towards Iizaka Onsen
Location
- Location within Fukushima Prefecture Location within Japan

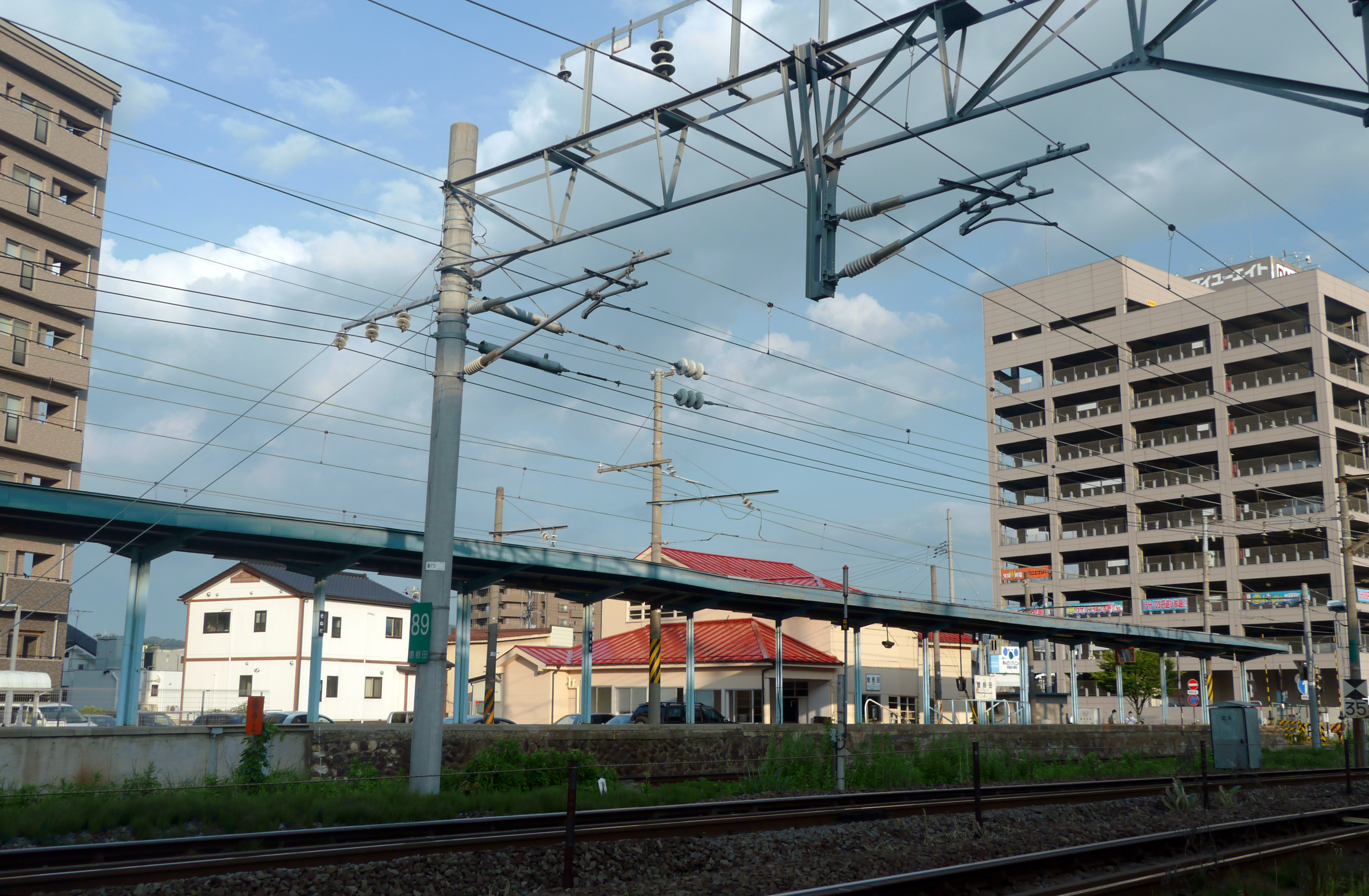
Soneda Station's platform

Soneda Station (Japanese: 曽根田駅, Hepburn: Soneda eki) is a train station located in the city of Fukushima, Fukushima Prefecture, Japan operated by Fukushima Kōtsū.

== Lines ==
Soneda Station is served by the Iizaka Line and is located 0.6 kilometres (0.37 mi) from the starting point of the line at Fukushima.

== Station layout ==
Soneda Station has one side platform serving a single bi-directional track. The ticket window is staffed in the morning and evening. There is a proof-of-departure ticket machine, a restroom, a beverage vending machine, a waiting room, and a flower shop located at the station. The station used to be capable of being used as a passing loop, however this is no longer possible due to the east-side track being decommissioned for through traffic. The Iizaka Line's rail yard also used to be located at Soneda, but it was moved to Sakuramizu in 1975.

== History ==
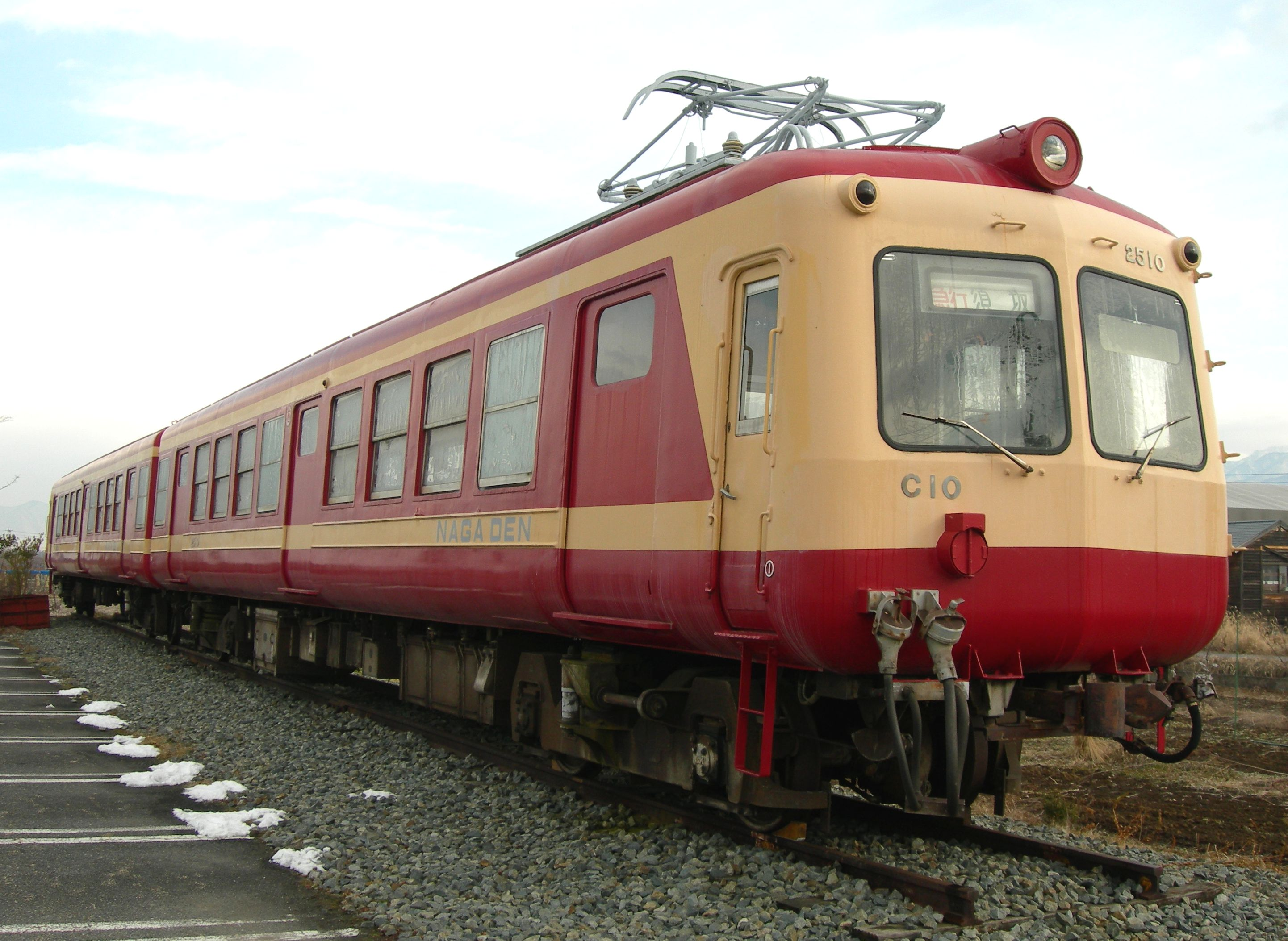
Tokyu 5000 series car operated by Nagano Electric Railway showing the color scheme the repainted station is based on

- 1924, April 13 — Soneda Station opens along with the opening of the Fukushima Iizaka Tramway (福島飯坂電車軌道, Fukushima Iizaka Dennsha Kidō)
- 1942 — Due to the section of track between Fukushima and Moriai (present-day Bijutsukantoshokanmae) being changed to dedicated tramway track, Soneda and Moriai stations are shut down. Moriai Station is reopened in a new location, and Dentetsu Fukushima Station (電鉄福島駅) (present-day Soneda Station) is opened.
- 1962 — Dentetsu Fukushima Station is renamed to Soneda Station.
- 2010 — Soneda is repainted to have a red roof and cream walls in the image of the Tokyu 5000 series trains that ran on the Iizaka Line until 1991.
