= Sumadera Station =

Railway station in Kobe, Japan

Coordinates: 34.6459°N 135.1160°E

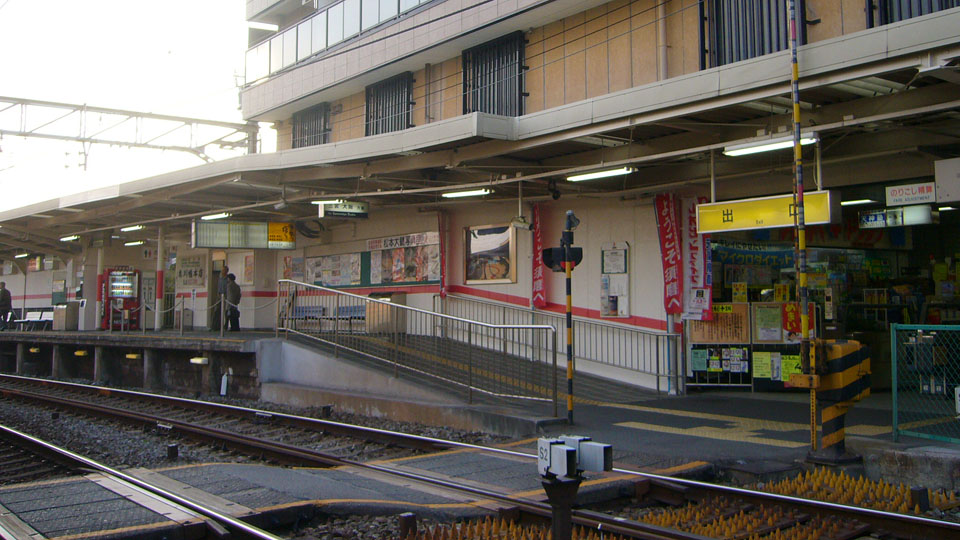
Sumadera Station

Sumadera Station (須磨寺駅, Sumadera-eki) is a railway station in Suma-ku, Kobe, Hyōgo Prefecture, Japan.

== Lines ==
- Sanyo Electric Railway

- Main Line

== Adjacent stations ==
| « | Service | » |
Sanyo Electric Railway
Main Line
| Tsukimiyama | Sanyo Local | Sanyo Suma |
| Tsukimiyama | Hanshin Local | Sanyo Suma |
| Tsukimiyama | Hanshin Limited Express | Sanyo Suma |
Sanyo S Limited Express: Does not stop at this station
Through Limited Express (yellow marking): Does not stop at this station
Through Limited Express (red marking): Does not stop at this station
