= Sugaya Station =

Railway station in Tamura, Fukushima Prefecture, Japan

Sugaya Station 菅谷駅
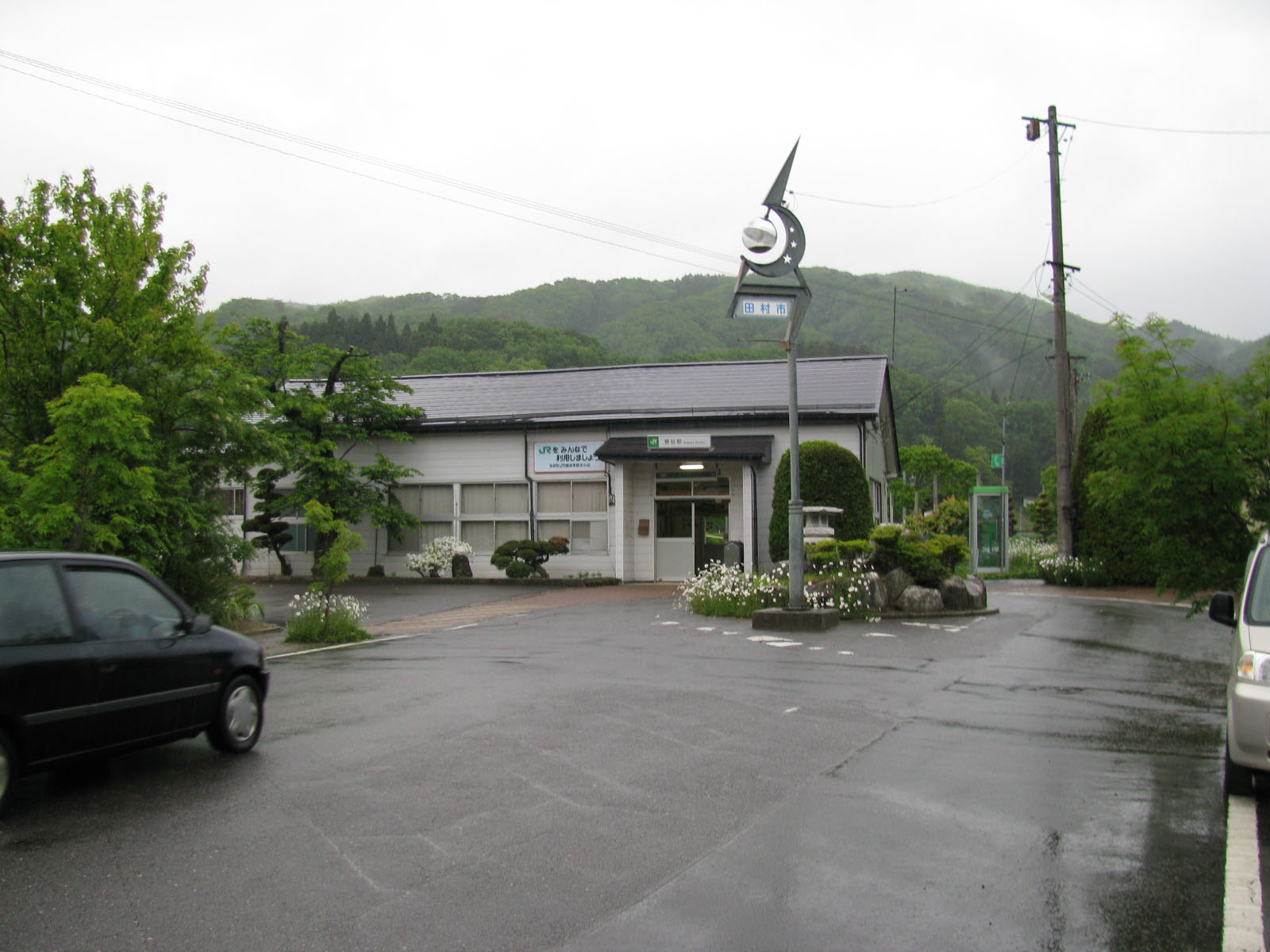
- Sugaya Station in May 2008

General information
- Location: Yakine-cho Sugaya, Tamura-shi, Fukushima-ken 963-3601; Japan
- Coordinates: 37.3508°N 140.6441°E
- Elevation: 463.2 meters
- Operator: JR East
- Line: ■ Ban'etsu East Line
- Distance: 49.9 km from Iwaki
- Platforms: 1 side platform

Other information
- Status: Staffed
- Website: Official website

History
- Opened: October 10, 1948

Passengers
- FY2018: 69 daily

Services
Preceding station	JR East	Following station
Ōgoe towards Kōriyama	Ban'etsu East Line Local	Kanmata towards Iwaki
Location
- Location within Fukushima Prefecture Location within Japan

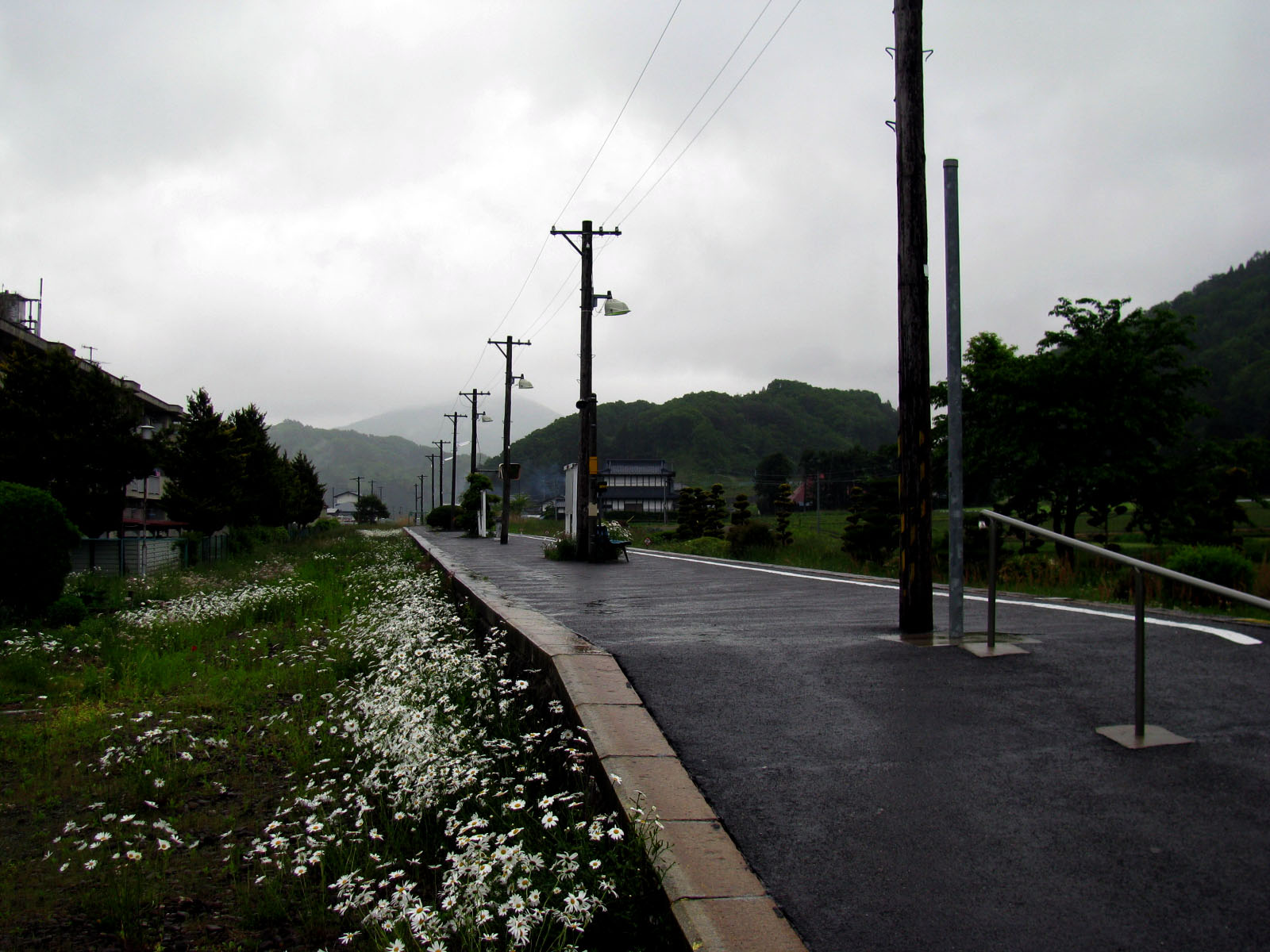
Platform

Sugaya Station (菅谷駅, Sugaya-eki) is a railway station in the city of Tamura, Fukushima Prefecture, Japan, operated by East Japan Railway Company (JR East).

== Lines ==
Sugaya Station is served by the Ban'etsu East Line, and is located 49.9 rail kilometers from the official starting point of the line at Iwaki.

== Station layout ==
The station has one side platform serving a single bi-directional track. The station is staffed.

== History ==
Sugaya Station opened on October 10, 1948. The station was absorbed into the JR East network upon the privatization of the Japanese National Railways (JNR) on April 1, 1987.

== Passenger statistics ==
In fiscal 2018, the station was used by an average of 69 passengers daily (boarding passengers only).

== Surrounding area ==
- Sugaya Post Office
- Abukuma-do

== See also ==
- List of railway stations in Japan
