= Shioya Station (Hyōgo) =

Railway station in Kobe, Japan

Shioya Station 塩屋駅
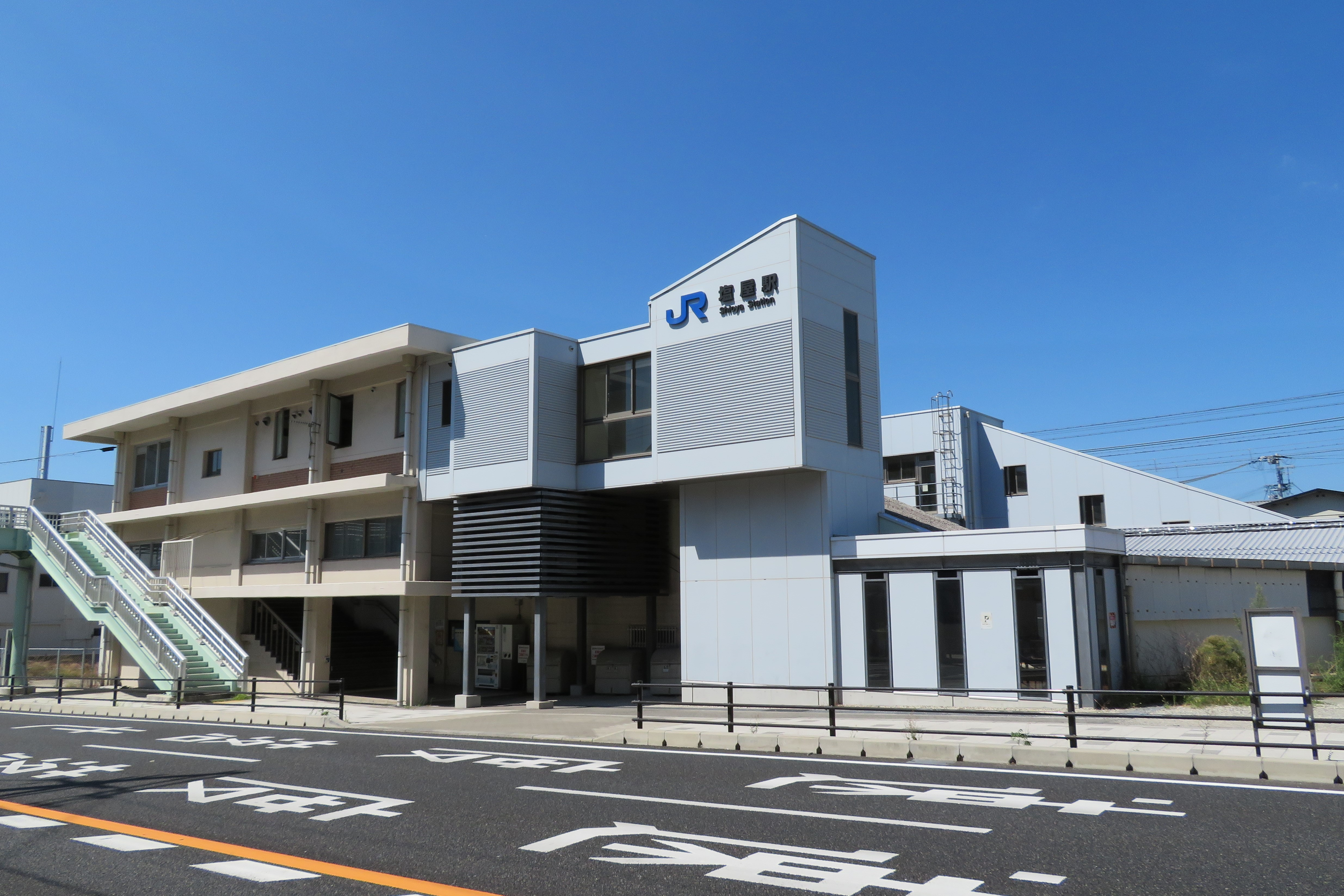
- Shioya Station, September 2019

General information
- Location: 1-chōme-2 Shioyachō, Tarumi-ku, Kobe-shi, Hyōgo-ken 655-0872; Japan
- Coordinates: 34°38′01″N 135°05′00″E
- Owner: West Japan Railway Company
- Operator: West Japan Railway Company
- Line: San'yō Main Line
- Distance: 10.2 km (6.3 miles) from Kobe
- Platforms: 2 side platforms
- Tracks: 2
- Connections: Bus stop

Construction
- Structure type: Ground level
- Accessible: Yes

Other information
- Status: Staffed
- Station code: JR-A69
- Website: Official website

History
- Opened: 1 July 1896

Passengers
- FY2019: 6640 daily
Location
- Location within Hyōgo Prefecture Location within Japan

Shioya Station (塩屋駅, Shioya-eki) is a passenger railway station located in Tarumi-ku, Kobe, Hyōgo Prefecture, Japan, operated by the West Japan Railway Company (JR West).

== Lines ==
Shioya Station is served by the JR San'yō Main Line (also referred to as the JR Kobe Line), and is located 10.2 kilometers from the terminus of the line at Kobe and 43.3 kilometers from Osaka.

== Station layout ==
The station consists of two opposed side platforms connected by a footbridge and two tracks. There are two additional bypass tracks which are typically utilized by Special Rapid train service to bypass the stop. The station is staffed.

=== Platforms ===
1	■ JR Kobe Line	for Nishi-Akashi and Himeji
2	■ JR Kobe Line	for Sannomiya, Amagasaki, and Osaka

== Adjacent stations ==
«	Service	»
JR West
Sanyō Main Line (JR Kobe Line)
Suma	Local	Tarumi
Limited Express Super Hakuto: Does not stop at this station
Limited Express Hamakaze: Does not stop at this station
Commuter Limited Express Rakuraku Harima: Does not stop at this station
Special Rapid: Does not stop at this station
Rapid: Does not stop at this station

== History ==
Shioya Station opened on 1 July 1896 as a temporary stop, and was promoted to a full station on 1 December 1906.

On 18 June 1967, a home-made bomb exploded on a commuter train here, killing two and wounding 29. The motive has never been discovered.

With the privatization of the Japan National Railways (JNR) on 1 April 1987, the station came under the aegis of the West Japan Railway Company.

Station numbering was introduced in March 2018 with Shioya being assigned station number JR-A69.

== Passenger statistics ==
In fiscal 2019, the station was used by an average of 6640 passengers daily

== Surrounding area ==
- Sanyo Shioya Station (Sanyo Electric Railway Main Line)
- Mount James
- Mt. Hachibuse
- Shioya Wakamiya Shrine

== See also ==
- List of railway stations in Japan
