= Sakusabe Station =

Monorail station in Chiba, Japan

CM05 Sakusabe Station 作草部駅
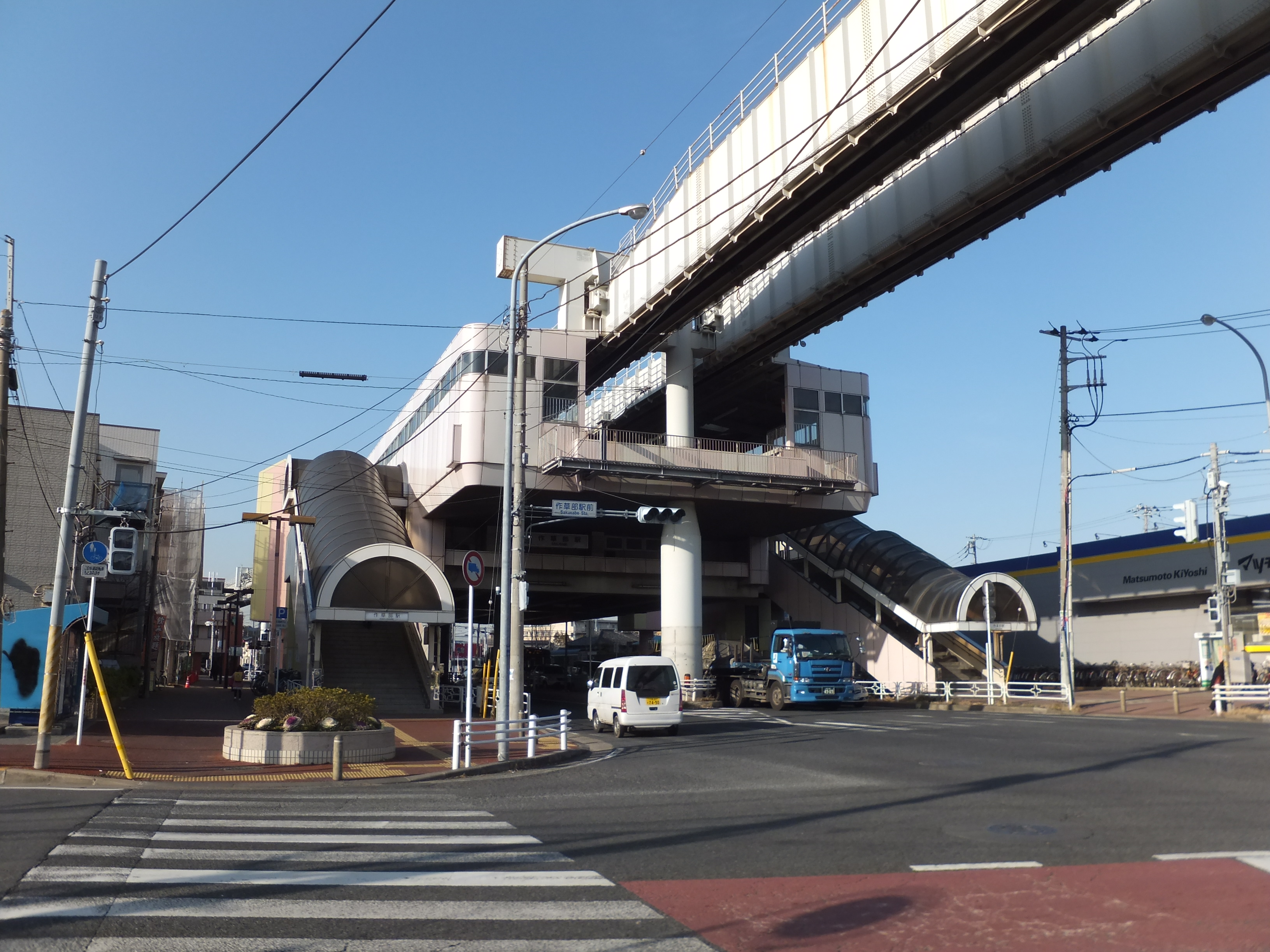
- Sakusabe Station in February 2012

General information
- Location: 2-1-19 Sakusabe, Inage-ku, Chiba-shi, Chiba-ken; Japan
- Coordinates: 35.6260°N 140.1151°E
- Operator: Chiba Urban Monorail
- Line: Chiba Urban Monorail Line 2

History
- Opened: 12 June 1991

Passengers
- FY2009: 1,784 daily

Services
Preceding station	Chiba Urban Monorail	Following station
Chibakōen CM04 towards Chiba	Line 2	Tendai CM06 towards Chishirodai
Location
- Location within Chiba Prefecture Location within Japan

Sakusabe Station (作草部駅, Sakusabe-eki) is a monorail station on the Chiba Urban Monorail located in Inage-ku in the city of Chiba, Chiba Prefecture, Japan. It is 1.8 kilometers from the northern terminus of the line at Chiba Station.

== Lines ==
- Chiba Urban Monorail Line 2

== Layout ==
Sakusabe Station is an elevated station with two opposed side platforms serving two tracks.

=== Platforms ===
1	■ Chiba Urban Monorail Line 2	for Tsuga and Chishirodai
2	■ Chiba Urban Monorail Line 2	for Chiba and Chiba-Minato

== History ==
Sakusabe Station opened on June 12, 1991.

== See also ==
- List of railway stations in Japan
