= Hidaka Expressway =

Expressway in Hokkaido, Japan

Hidaka Expressway
- 日高自動車道

Route information
- Maintained by East Nippon Expressway Company/Ministry of Land, Infrastructure, Transport and Tourism
- Length: 59.9 km (37.2 mi)
- Existed: 1998–present
- Component highways: National Route 235

Major junctions
- West end: Dō-Ō Expressway in Tomakomai, Hokkaido
- East end: Hokkaido Route 208 in Hidaka, Hokkaido

Location
- Country: Japan

Highway system
- National highways of Japan; Expressways of Japan

The Hidaka Expressway (Japanese: 日高自動車道(ひだかじどうしゃどう), Hepburn: Hidaka Jidōsha-dō) is a partially tolled expressway in Iburi Subprefecture and Hidaka Subprefecture, Hokkaido, Japan. The expressway connects Hidaka to the Dō-Ō Expressway. It is owned and operated by partially by the East Nippon Expressway Company and the Ministry of Land, Infrastructure, Transport and Tourism (MLIT). It is signed as an auxiliary route of National Route 235 as well as E63 under their "2016 Proposal for Realization of Expressway Numbering.

== Naming ==
The name Hidaka is derived from the province of the same name established in 1869, which in turn was named after an unknown country "in the Eastern wilds" called Hitakami in the Nihonshoki, a history book written in 720. There is no direct connection between the Hitakami of the Nihonshoki and the modern Hidaka Subprefecture.

== Route description ==
=== Lane configuration ===
Section	Total lanes = Westbound lanes + Eastbound Lanes	Speed limit	Toll
Tomakomai-higashi IC – Numanohata-nishi IC	4=2+2	100 km/h	Yes
Numanohata-nishi IC – Numanohata-higashi IC	2=1+1 ※partially, 4=2+2	80 km/h	No
Numanohata-higashi IC – Atsuma IC	4=2+2	100 km/h	No
Atsuma IC – Hidaka Atsuga IC	2=1+1 ※partially, 4=2+2	70 km/h	No

== History ==
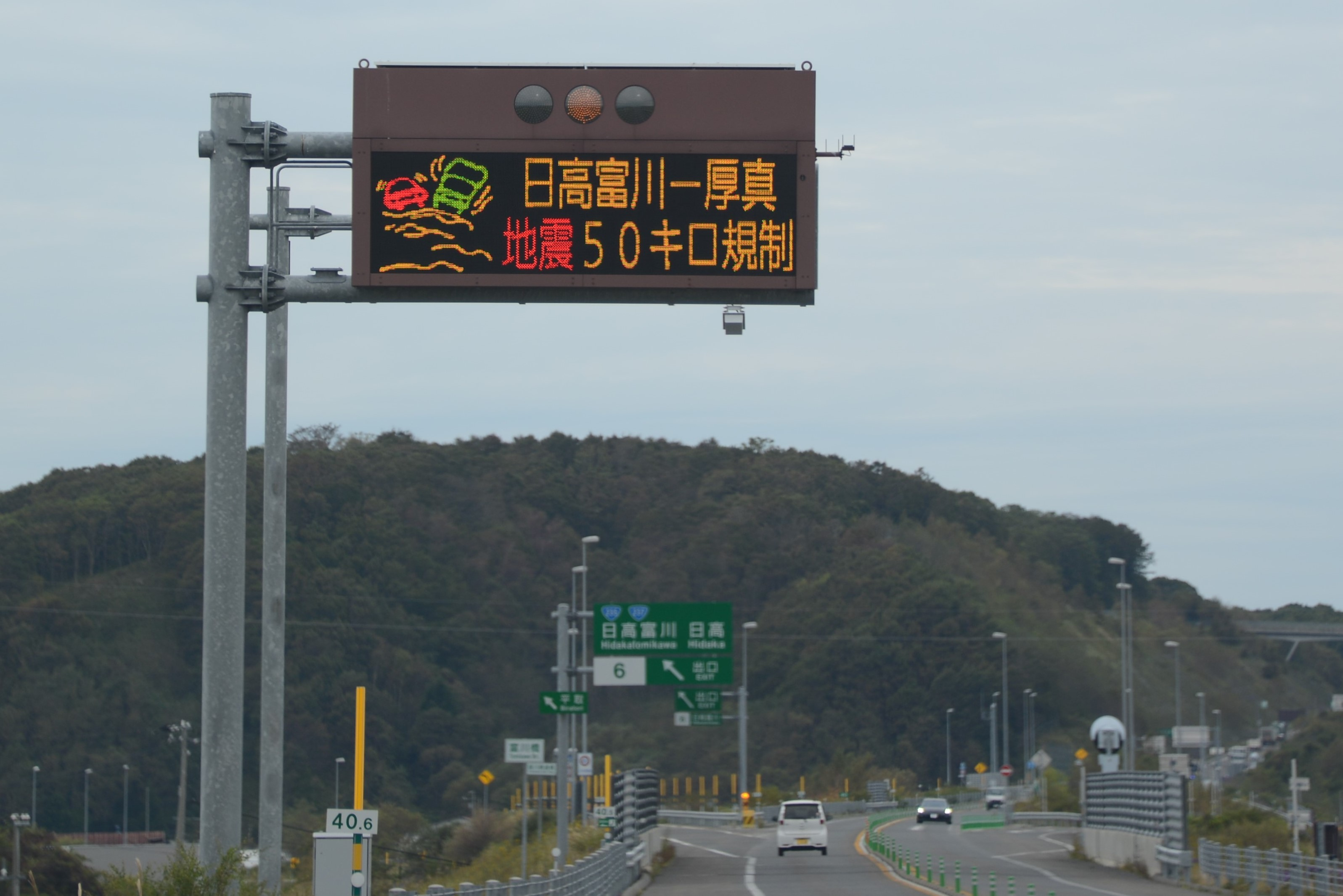
A variable-message sign tells drivers that a section of the Hidaka Expressway is damaged in the aftermath of the 2018 Hokkaido Eastern Iburi earthquake.

The first section of the Hidaka Expressway to open was a 19.7-kilometer (12.2 mi)-long section between the western terminus at the Dō-Ō Expressway in Tomakomai and Atsuma in 1998. In consideration of the effects of the 2011 Tōhoku earthquake and tsunami, it was decided by MLIT that future sections of the expressway should follow a path further inland to avoid inundation by a tsunami. This decision has delayed further construction of the expressway.

The expressway was temporarily closed after being damaged by the 2018 Hokkaido Eastern Iburi earthquake.

== Future ==
Construction of the expressway is to be continued east to the town of Urakawa on the southeastern point of the island of Hokkaido.

== Junction list ==
The entire expressway is in Hokkaido.

Location	km	mi	Exit	Name	Destinations	Notes
Tomakomai	0	0.0	22/TB	Tomakomai-higashi	Dō-Ō Expressway – Muroran, Sapporo	Western terminus
Tomakomai	4.0	2.5	1	Numanohata-nishi	National Route 235 – Central Tomakomai, Iwamizawa (Taiheiyō Ferry – to Hachinohe, Sendai, Nagoya)	Eastbound exit, westbound entrance
Tomakomai	7.9	4.9	2	Numanohata-higashi	National Route 235 – Central Tomakomai, Iwamizawa	Westbound exit, eastbound entrance
Tomakomai	11.8	7.3	3	Tomato-chuo	National Route 235 – Central Tomakomai, Urakawa	
Atsuma	19.7	12.2	4	Atsuma	Hokkaido Route 287 – Central Atsuma, Urakawa	
Mukawa	28.1	17.5	5	Mukawa	Hokkaido Route 10 – Central Mukawa, Atsuma	
Hidaka	39.9	24.8	6	Hidakatomikawa	National Route 237 – Hidaka, Urakawa	
Hidaka	45.7	28.4	7	Hidakamonbetsu	Hokkaido Route 351 – Urakawa, Hirotomi	Eastbound exit, westbound entrance
Hidaka	59.9	37.2	8	Hidaka Atsuga	Hokkaido Route 208 – Central Atsuga, Shinwa	Eastbound exit, westbound entrance. Eastern terminus as of December 2018
1.000 mi = 1.609 km; 1.000 km = 0.621 mi: Electronic toll collection; Incomplete access
