= Japan National Route 336 =

National highway in Japan

National Route 336
- 国道336号

Route information
- Length: 234.8 km (145.9 mi)
- Existed: 1 April 1975–present

Major junctions
- East end: Urakawa, Hokkaidō
- West end: Kushiro, Hokkaidō

Location
- Country: Japan

Highway system
- National highways of Japan; Expressways of Japan
| ← National Route 335 | → National Route 337 |

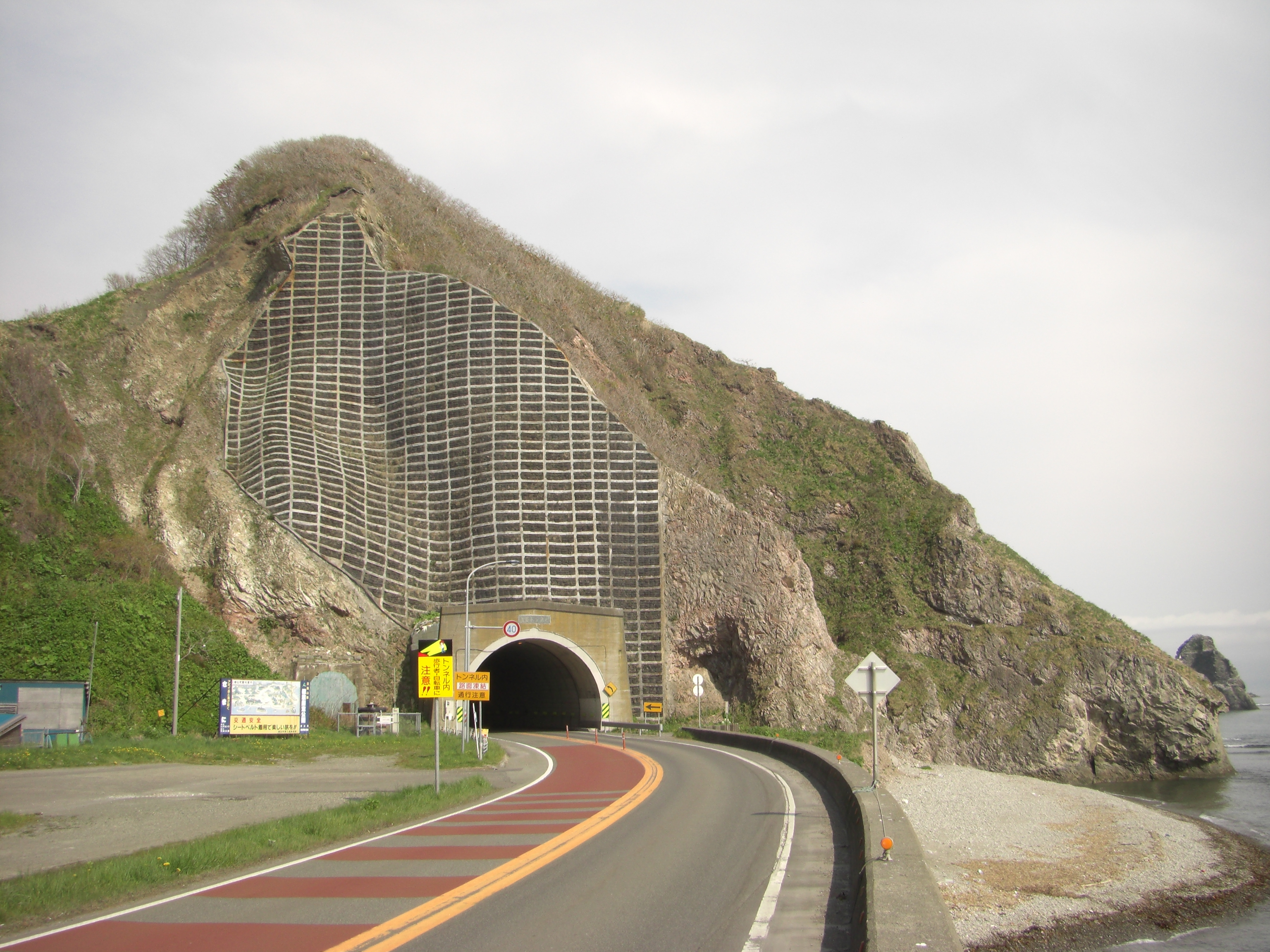
Shiogama Tunnel

National Route 336 (国道336号, Kokudō Sanbyakusanjūroku-gō) is a national highway connecting Urakawa, Hokkaido and Kushiro, Hokkaido in Japan.

== Route description ==
- Length: 234.8 kilometres (145.9 mi)
- Origin: Urakawa (originates at junction with Route 235 and Route 236)
- Terminus: Kushiro
- Major cities: Kushiro

== Passes through ==
Hokkaido

Hidaka Subprefecture

Urakawa District, Hokkaido

- Urakawa, Hokkaido

Samani District, Hokkaido

- Samani, Hokkaido

Horoizumi District, Hokkaido

- Erimo, Hokkaido

Tokachi Subprefecture

Hiroo District, Hokkaido

- Hiroo, Hokkaido
- Taiki, Hokkaido

Nakagawa (Tokachi) District, Hokkaido

- Makubetsu, Hokkaido

Hiroo District, Hokkaido

- Taiki, Hokkaido

Tokachi District, Hokkaido

- Urahoro, Hokkaido

Kushiro Subprefecture

- Kushiro, Hokkaido

Shiranuka District, Hokkaido

- Shiranuka, Hokkaido

- Kushiro, Hokkaido

== Intersects with ==
Hokkaido

Hidaka Subprefecture

- Route 235 and Route 236
  Overlap with Route 236
- Route 236
- Hokkaidō Highway 389
- Hokkaidō Highway 233
- Hokkaidō Highway 34

Tokachi Subprefecture

- Hokkaidō Highway 1071
- Hokkaidō Highway 315
- Hokkaidō Highway 987
- Hokkaidō Highway 414
- Hokkaidō Highway 1037
- Route 236
  Overlap with Route 236
- Route 236
- Hokkaidō Highway 501
- Hokkaidō Highway 55
- Hokkaidō Highway 319
- Hokkaidō Highway 318
- Hokkaidō Highway 912
- Hokkaidō Highway 911
- Route 38
  Overlap with Route 38

Kushiro Subprefecture

- Hokkaidō Highway 25
