= 2018 Hokkaido Eastern Iburi earthquake =

Earthquake in Japan

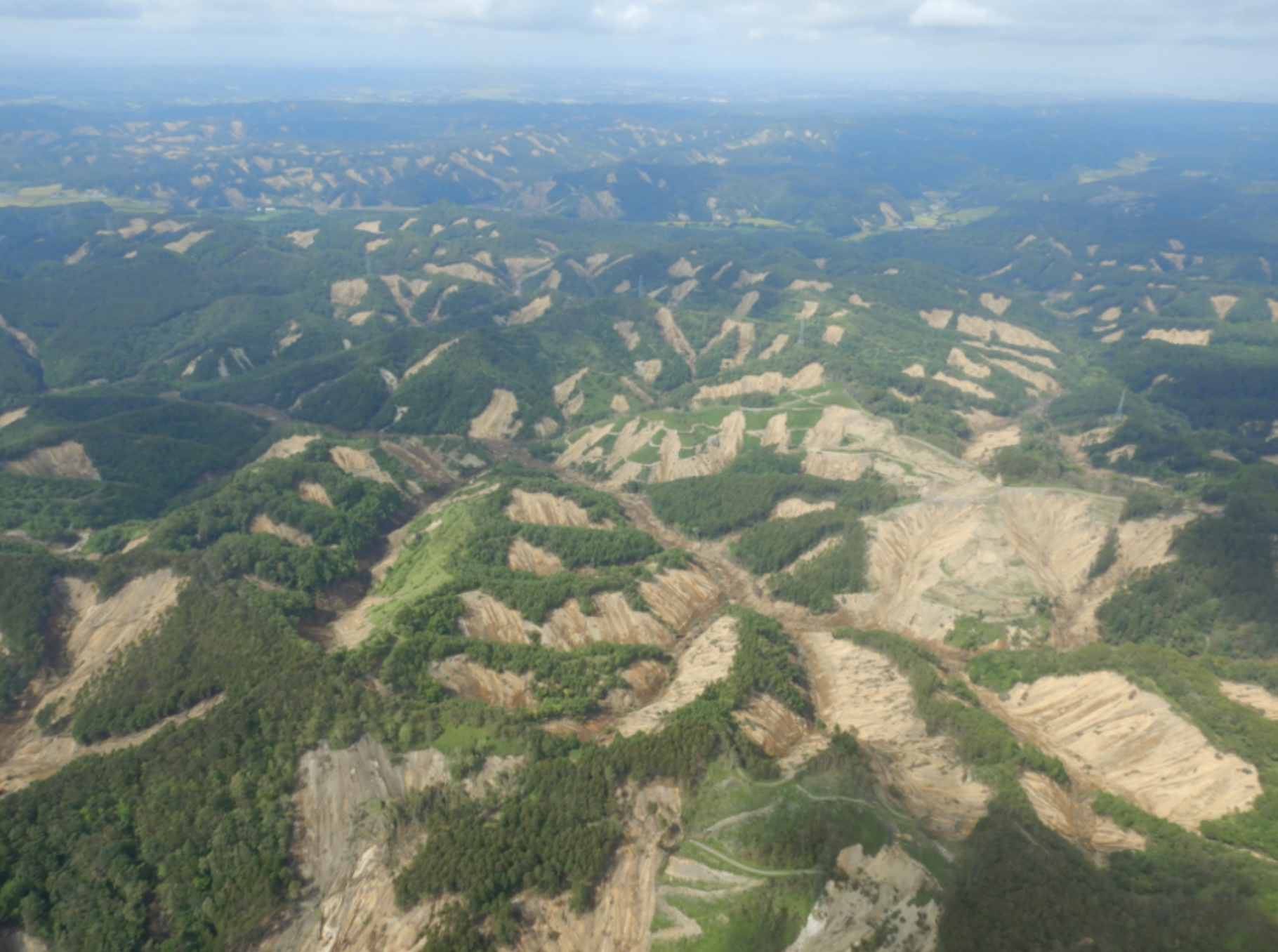
- Landslides in Atsuma

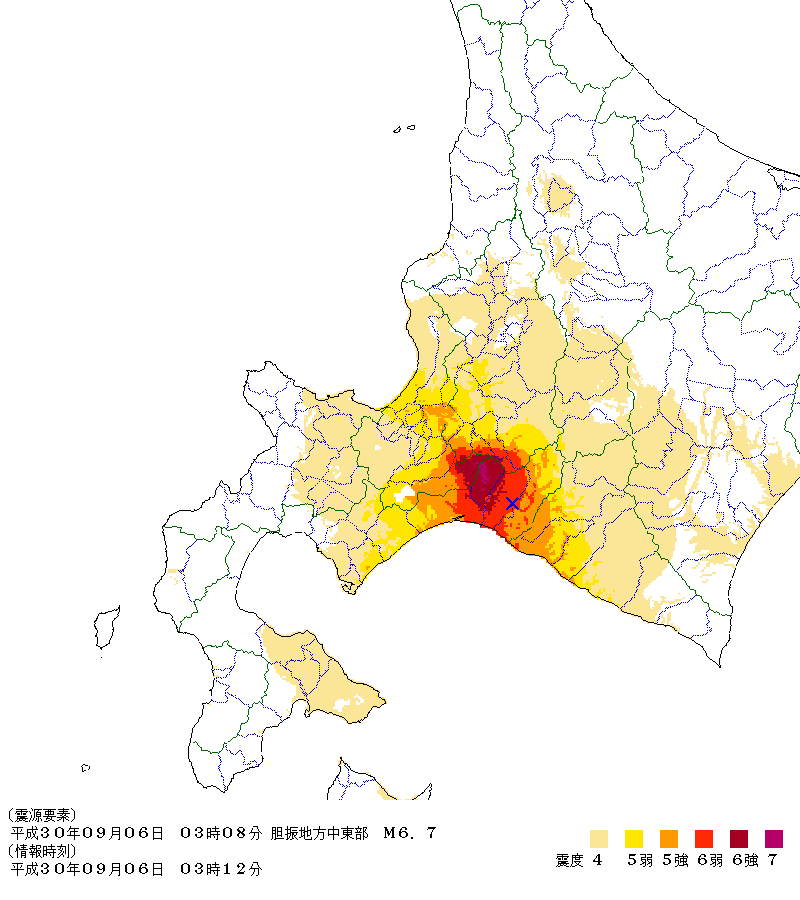
- Intensity map
- UTC time: 2018-09-05 18:07:58
- ISC event: 612697604
- USGS-ANSS: ComCat
- Local date: 6 September 2018
- Local time: 3:08 a.m. JST
- Magnitude: 6.6 M_{w}
- Depth: 35.0 km (22 mi)
- Epicenter: 42.671°N 141.933°E
- Type: Dip-slip (reverse); Intraplate earthquake
- Areas affected: Japan
- Max. intensity: MMI X (Extreme) JMA 7
- Peak acceleration: 1.83 g 1796 Gal
- Tsunami: No
- Landslides: Yes
- Aftershocks: 130; Largest: M_{w}5.7 on 21 February 2019 (9:22 pm JST)
- Casualties: 41 dead, 691 injuries

An earthquake measuring 6.6 M_{w} on the moment magnitude scale struck Iburi Subprefecture in southern Hokkaido, Japan, on 6 September 2018 at 3:08 a.m. JST. The earthquake's epicenter was near Tomakomai and occurred at a depth of 35.0 kilometers (21.7 mi). The Japan Meteorological Agency (JMA) registered a magnitude of 6.7 M_{j} and a maximum intensity of 7 on the shindo scale. Shaking from the earthquake was felt strongly in Hokkaido and Aomori Prefecture, and shaking was felt as far away as the Kantō region. Long period ground motion (LPGM) during the earthquake reached maximum of class 4 on the JMA LPGM intensity scales. The earthquake disrupted electrical service throughout Hokkaido, leaving 5.3 million residents without power. Forty-one people were confirmed dead and six hundred and ninety-one were injured. The event is officially known as Heisei san-jū-nen Hokkaidō Iburi tōbu jishin (平成30年北海道胆振東部地震; "Hokkaido Eastern Iburi Earthquake of Heisei 30").

== Geology ==
The central area of Hokkaido where the earthquake was centered is prone to earthquakes despite not being located on any plate boundary. According to a survey conducted by the Ministry of Education, Culture, Sports, Science and Technology, there are several active seismic zones in the central part of Hokkaido, including the Furano and Ishikari fault zones. Studies have shown that earthquakes occurred in 1910, 1974, 1981, 1982, and 2000 in the region. Among them, the 7.1 M_{j} 1982 earthquake off the coast of Urakawa was the largest earthquake in the history of the region. The earthquake caused casualties and damage in Tomakomai and Sapporo. There are many volcanoes located near the earthquake's epicenter. The volcanoes distributed pumicite throughout the area which was later covered with a layer of heavier soil. The volcanic material is theorized to have caused landslides after being inundated during heavy rains due to its slippery nature. The wet pumice and the soil on top of it slid away after the shear forces of the earthquake ruptured the strata, causing the landslides that led to most of the casualties of the earthquake.

=== Aftershocks ===
Aftershocks of 2018 Hokkaido Eastern Iburi earthquake

On 21 February 2019, a magnitude 5.7 M_{JMA} aftershock struck 10 km north of the epicenter of the main earthquake. This has been the strongest recorded aftershock of the earthquake. No major damage was reported, but there were small disruptions to rail systems such as the Hokkaido Shinkansen and the Sapporo Municipal Subway. In total four people, from Sapporo, Tomakomai and Noboribetsu, were injured and an avalanche was triggered in the town of Atsuma.

== Damage and effects ==
Overall, damage in Hokkaido was estimated to be at least 367.5 billion yen ($3.32B). The earthquake crippled multiple industries and public facilities in the region.

=== Blackout ===
Number of households that had power restored (JST)
Date	Time	Households	%	Ref
6 Sep	3:08	0 / 2,950,000	0%	
6 Sep	16:00	329,000	12%	
7 Sep	3:00	964,000	33%	
7 Sep	9:00	1,455,000	49%	
7 Sep	12:00	1,513,000	51%	
8 Sep	4:00	2,928,000	99%	

The earthquake cut power to all 2.95 million households in Hokkaido. This was because the Hokkaido Electric Power Company's coal-fired power plant in Atsuma was heavily damaged by fires that broke out during the earthquake. The damage to the plant caused an imbalance in the supply and demand of electricity throughout Hokkaido; this resulted in the blackout. By 6:30 p.m. JST on the day of the earthquake, power was restored to 340,000 households in Hokkaido. Hospitals were forced to function on emergency backup power, due to the blackout. Many hospitals had to turn away emergency patients because of the outages.

=== Transportation ===
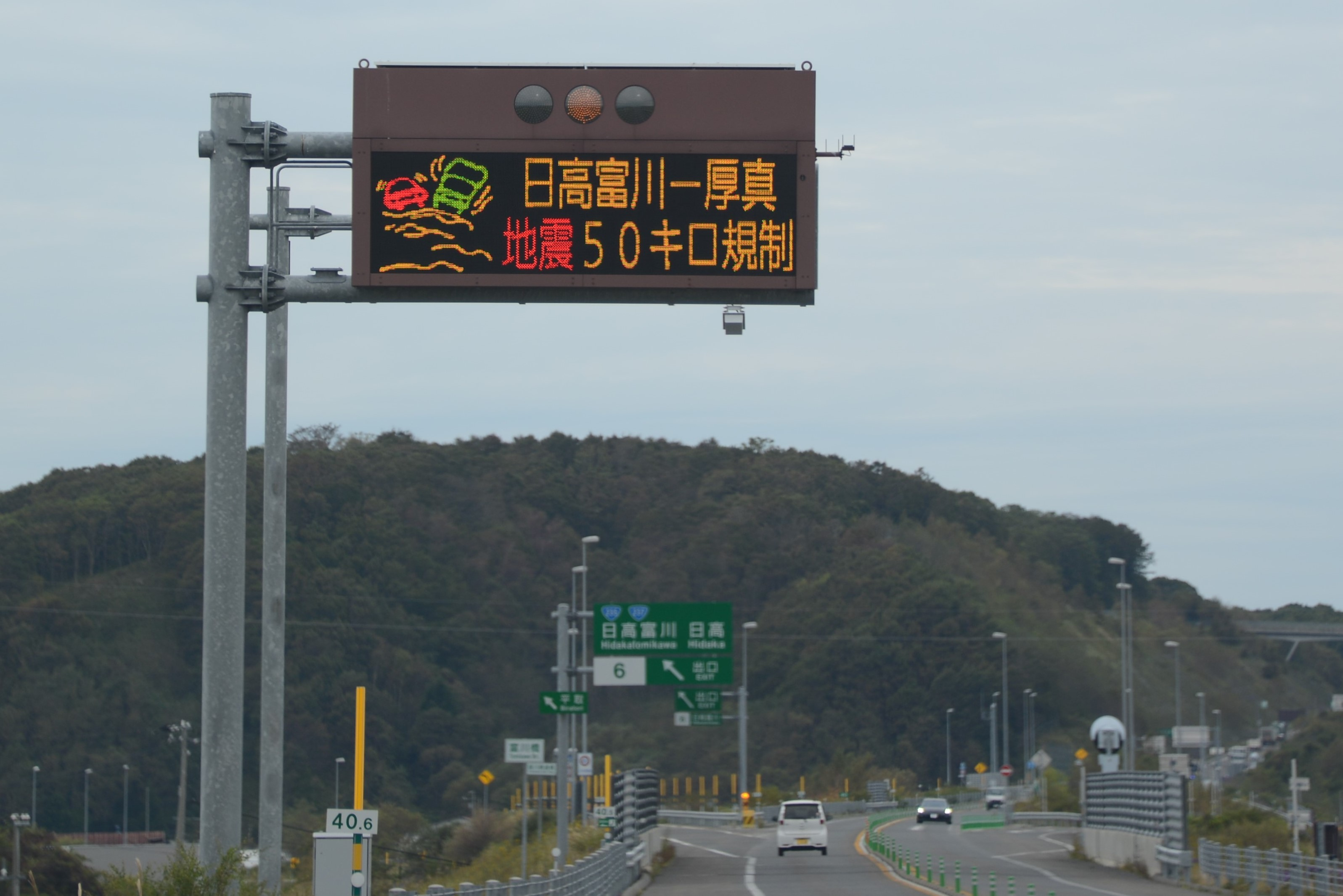
A variable-message sign tells drivers that a section of the Hidaka Expressway is closed

All flights to New Chitose Airport were cancelled on the day of the quake. The airport resumed business at 11:00 a.m. JST the day after the quake. All public transport, including rail, subway, and bus services was shut down in Hokkaido due to the loss of electricity and damage.

The earthquake caused many roads in Hokkaido to become impassable. Some roads were blocked by debris from landslides, others were destroyed by soil liquefaction as far away from the epicenter as Kiyota-ku, Sapporo. Near the earthquake's epicenter in Atsuma, emergency services could not take emergency calls after the quake due to the heavy damage.

The East Nippon Expressway Company reported these expressways in Hokkaido were subject to closures after the quake:

- Dō-Ō Expressway
- Dōtō Expressway
- Sasson Expressway
- Hidaka Expressway

=== Economic impact ===
The blackout had a severe impact on the farming and fishing industries in Hokkaido. The prefecture provides half of Japan's raw milk, but without power for refrigeration or operating the milking equipment, the cows could not be milked and the product was wasted. Other produce, such as onions and potatoes, could not be kept cool or shipped away due to the closure of the rail network. As a result, an estimated 13.6 billion yen worth of perishable goods was discarded.

The tourism industry in Hokkaido was hit hard by the immediate effects of the earthquake including delays and cancellations caused by the quakes' impact to transportation infrastructure; moreover, perceptions of the area as being dangerous due to aftershocks and general fear of earthquakes caused a decrease in tourism to the area. The total impact of the earthquake was estimated to cost the tourism industry approximately 35.6 billion yen as of October 2018.

== Seismic intensity ==
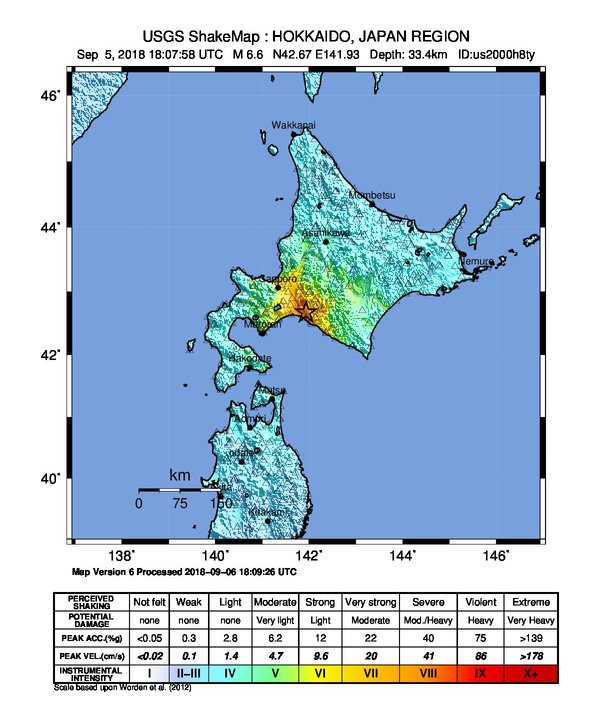
Shakemap for the 2018 Iburi earthquake

The earthquake was the first to have ever reached a maximum level of 7 on the Japan Meteorological Agency seismic intensity scale, or Shindo scale, in Hokkaido and the sixth in Japan since the system was put in place in 1949.

Cities and municipalities impacted by a seismic intensity level of 5 or more
Intensity	City or municipality name
7	Atsuma
6+	Abira, Mukawa
6-	New Chitose Airport, Hidaka, Biratori
5+	Sapporo, Tomakomai, Ebetsu, Mikasa, Chitose, Eniwa, Naganuma, Shinhidaka
5-	Hakodate, Muroran, Iwamizawa, Noboribetsu, Date, Kitahiroshima, Ishikari, Shinshinotsu, Nanporo, Yuni, Kuriyama, Shiraoi

== Long Period Ground Motion ==
The earthquake was also the first ever LPGM Class IV intensity observed in Hokkaido.

Locations with an observed LPGM Class II and higher
Class	Prefecture	Location
IV	Hokkaido	Southern Ishikari, Central and Eastern Iburi
II	Hokkaido	Northern and Central Ishikari, Northern and Eastern Shiribeshi, Southern Sorachi, Southern Kamikawa, Central and Western Hidaka, Central Tokachi

== Casualties ==
There were 41 confirmed deaths resulting from the earthquake. 691 people were reported to be injured, 17 of which were reported to be serious cases. Thirty-six of the deaths were in Atsuma. The region was inundated by Typhoon Jebi, the strongest typhoon to hit Japan in a quarter of a century, the day before the earthquake struck. The earthquake triggered landslides in the wet soil the typhoon left behind which killed multiple people.

== Response ==
=== Domestic ===
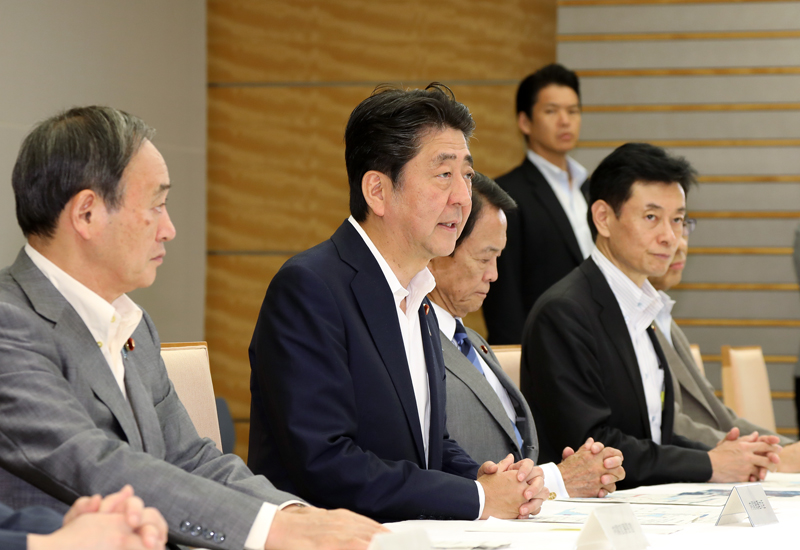
Prime Minister Shinzō Abe holding a meeting in response to the earthquake.

Prime Minister Shinzō Abe announced that 25,000 members of the Japan Self-Defense Forces would be deployed to Hokkaido to assist in disaster relief efforts. Also, he announced that he would temporarily suspend his campaign to be re-elected as President of the Liberal Democratic Party. His competitor, Shigeru Ishiba, also postponed some campaign activities. Abe visited Sapporo and Atsuma three days after the earthquake. He met with local political leaders and residents who were living at temporary shelters. After his visit, the prime minister announced that the government would allocate 540 million yen from reserves to aid in Hokkaido's recovery.

The Japan national football team cancelled a friendly match scheduled for 7 September against Chile in the Sapporo Dome. The team sent their condolences to the victims of the earthquake.

Rescue teams from Aomori Prefecture and Tokyo traveled to Hokkaido by the Seikan ferry to assist in the relief efforts.

Nintendo postponed its Nintendo Direct series release for a week in light of the disaster.

Facebook activated its safety check in response to the earthquake. Emperor Akihito and Empress Michiko visited Atsuma on 15 November to get in touch with the victims of the earthquake and landslides. Akihito also surveyed the area impacted by the landslides.

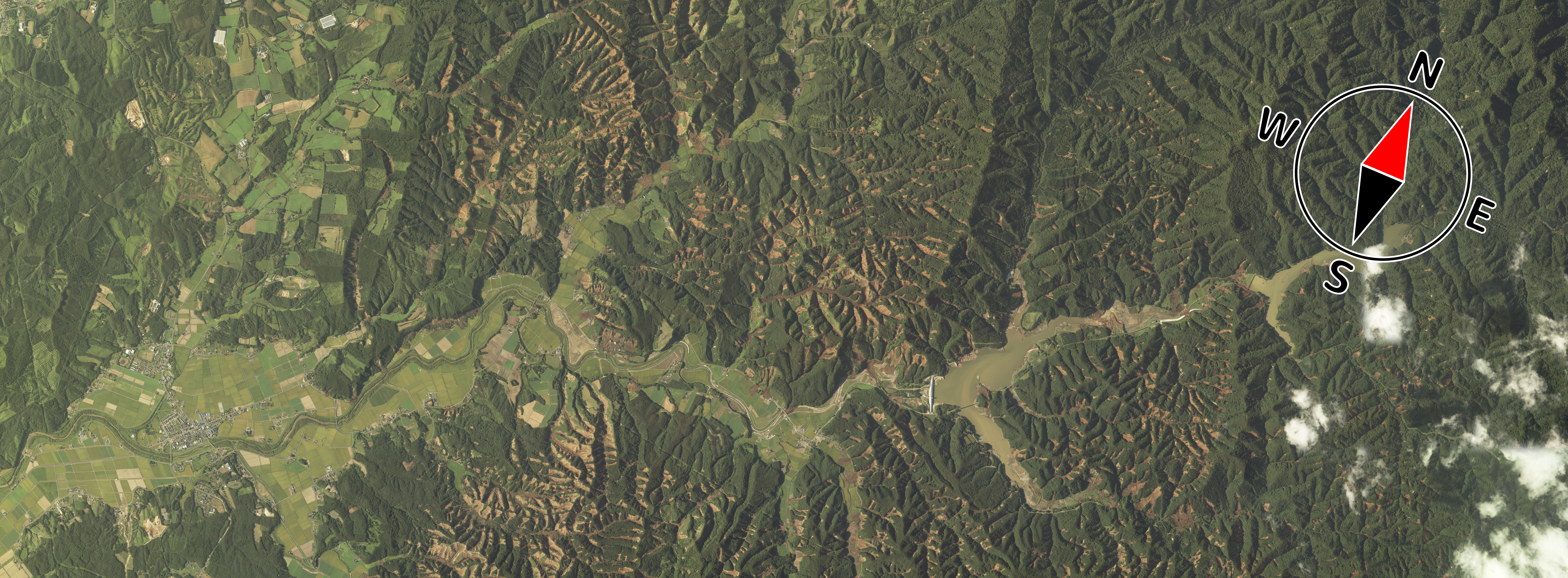
Landslides (brown) can be seen throughout an aerial photograph of northern Atsuma taken after the earthquake.

=== International ===
South Korean President Moon Jae-in, in response to typhoons and the earthquake, sent a Twitter message to Shinzō Abe on the sixth of September stating: "I express my condolences to the victims of the Kansai typhoon and the Hokkaido earthquake, and I wish comfort to those who have lost their families or were injured." He also voiced that Japan seems like they coped well with the various disasters that plagued the country in 2018.

== See also ==
- List of earthquakes in 2018
- List of earthquakes in Japan
