= Japan National Route 236 =

Road in Hokkaido, Japan

National Route 236
- 国道236号
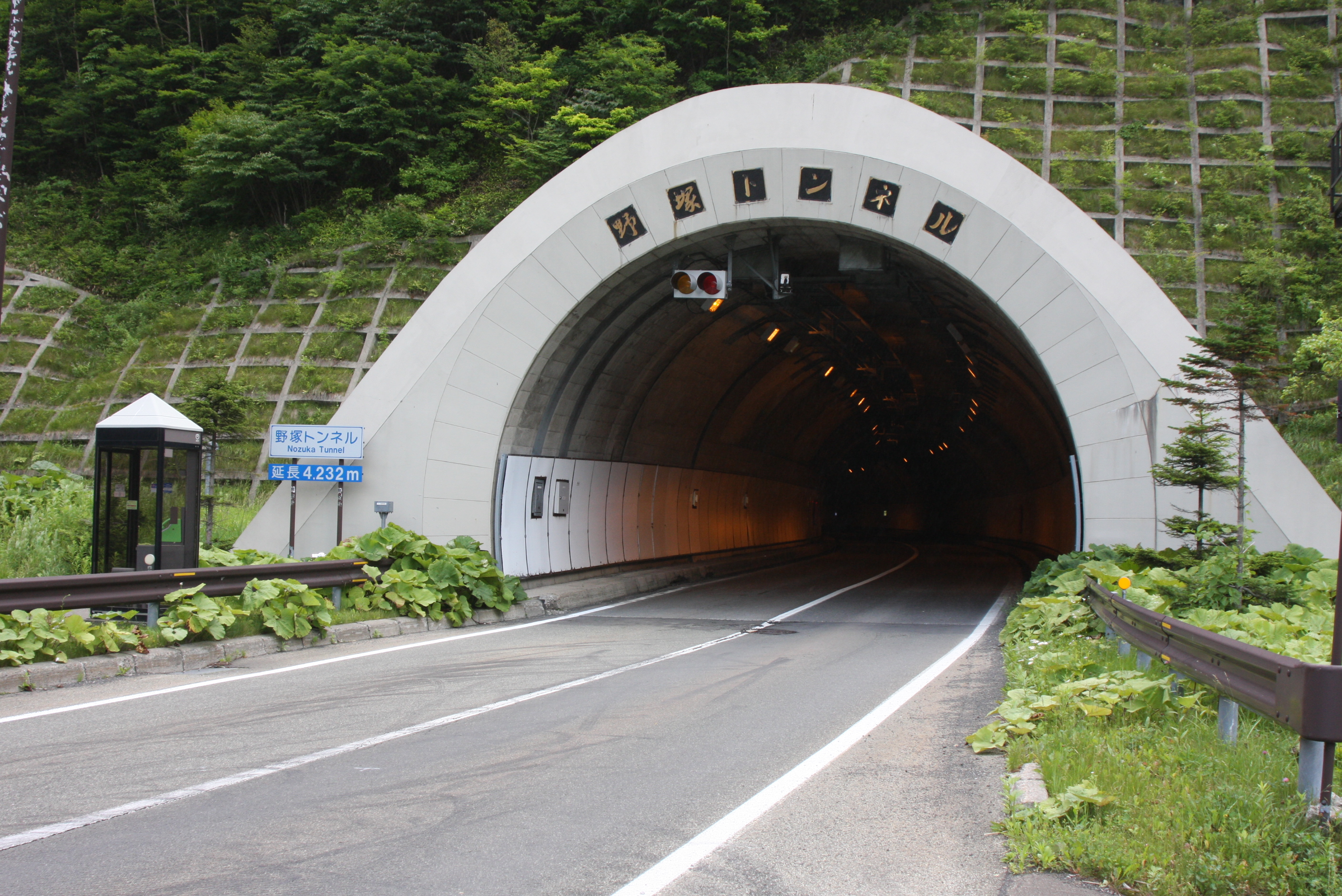

Route information
- Length: 139.1 km (86.4 mi)

Major junctions
- West end: Obihiro, Hokkaidō
- East end: Urakawa, Hokkaidō

Location
- Country: Japan

Highway system
- National highways of Japan; Expressways of Japan
← National Route 235	→ National Route 237

National Route 236 (国道236号, Kokudō nihyakusanjūroku-gō) is a national highway connecting Obihiro, Hokkaido and Urakawa, Hokkaido in Japan.

== Route description ==
- Length: 139.1 kilometers (86.4 mi)
- Origin: Obihiro, Hokkaido
- Terminus: Urakawa, Hokkaido (Terminates at junction with Route 235 and National Route 336
- Major cities: Obihiro, Hokkaido

== History ==
- 18 May 1953: Second Class National Highway 236 from Obihiro to Urakawa
- 1 April 1965: First Class National Highway 236

== Passes through ==
Hokkaido

Tokachi Subprefecture

- Obihiro, Hokkaido

Kasai District, Hokkaido

- Nakasatsunai, Hokkaido
- Sarabetsu, Hokkaido

Nakagawa (Tokachi) District, Hokkaido

- Makubetsu, Hokkaido

Hiroo District, Hokkaido

- Taiki, Hokkaido
- Hiroo, Hokkaido

Hidaka Subprefecture

Urakawa District, Hokkaido

- Urakawa, Hokkaido

== Intersects with ==
Hokkaido

Tokachi Subprefecture

- National Route 38 and National Route 241
- Hokkaido Highway 151
- Hokkaido Highway 1084
- Hokkaido Highway 1153
- Hokkaido Highway 214
- Hokkaido Highway 595
- Hokkaido Highway 62
- Hokkaido Highway 419
- Hokkaido Highway 321
- Hokkaido Highway 55
- Hokkaido Highway 55
- Hokkaido Highway 470
- Hokkaido Highway 210
- Hokkaido Highway 210
- Hokkaido Highway 238
- Hokkaido Highway 15
- Hokkaido Highway 319
- Hokkaido Highway 657
- Hokkaido Highway 55
- Hokkaido Highway 55
- Hokkaido Highway 773
- Hokkaido Highway 501
- Hokkaido Highway 622
- National Route 336
- National Route 336
- Hokkaido Highway 987

Hidaka Subprefecture

- Hokkaido Highway 746
- Hokkaido Highway 1025
- National Route 336 and National Route 235
