= Atsuma =

Atsuma 厚真町
- Town
- Flag Emblem

- Location of Atsuma in Hokkaido (Iburi Subprefecture)

- Location in Japan
- Coordinates: 42°43′25″N 141°52′40″E
- Country: Japan
- Region: Hokkaido
- Prefecture: Hokkaido (Iburi Subprefecture)
- District: Yūfutsu

Area
  - Total: 404.56 km^{2} (156.20 sq mi)

Population (March 31, 2017)
  - Total: 4,659
  - Density: 11.52/km^{2} (29.83/sq mi)
- Time zone: UTC+09:00 (JST)
- Climate: Dfb
- Website: www.town.atsuma.lg.jp

Atsuma (厚真町, Atsuma-chō) is a town located in Iburi Subprefecture, Hokkaido, Japan. In March 2017, the town had an estimated population of 4,659, and a density of 12 persons per km^{2}. The total area is 404.56 km^{2}. The annual town festival takes place in mid-July, and is called "Inaka Matsuri" or "Country Festival". It is a two-day affair that starts in the main section of town with a parade featuring the Atsuma Dance and continuing until the next day with performances at the Atsuma Dam.

There is a surfing beach nearby where the annual "Hama Matsuri" or "Beach Festival" it takes place in early August.

== Geography ==
Atsuma has several rivers of which the most prominent is the Atsuma River. It is dammed in the northern area of town and continues down through the center of town and empties into the ocean near the ferry terminal and the Tomato-Atsuma Power Station.

=== Neighbouring municipalities ===
- Abira
- Mukawa
- Tomakomai
- Yūbari
- Yuni

=== Climate ===
Climate data for Atsuma (1991−2020 normals, extremes 1977−present)
Month	Jan	Feb	Mar	Apr	May	Jun	Jul	Aug	Sep	Oct	Nov	Dec	Year
Record high °C (°F)	7.9 (46.2)	9.7 (49.5)	16.6 (61.9)	23.9 (75.0)	30.1 (86.2)	30.8 (87.4)	34.1 (93.4)	34.1 (93.4)	31.2 (88.2)	24.6 (76.3)	19.4 (66.9)	13.7 (56.7)	34.1 (93.4)
Mean daily maximum °C (°F)	−0.8 (30.6)	−0.1 (31.8)	4.0 (39.2)	11.0 (51.8)	16.6 (61.9)	20.1 (68.2)	23.4 (74.1)	25.1 (77.2)	22.3 (72.1)	16.1 (61.0)	8.6 (47.5)	1.5 (34.7)	12.3 (54.2)
Daily mean °C (°F)	−6.7 (19.9)	−5.9 (21.4)	−0.9 (30.4)	5.2 (41.4)	11.0 (51.8)	15.2 (59.4)	19.1 (66.4)	20.5 (68.9)	16.7 (62.1)	10.0 (50.0)	3.4 (38.1)	−3.7 (25.3)	7.0 (44.6)
Mean daily minimum °C (°F)	−13.8 (7.2)	−13.3 (8.1)	−6.7 (19.9)	−0.6 (30.9)	5.6 (42.1)	11.1 (52.0)	15.7 (60.3)	16.7 (62.1)	11.5 (52.7)	4.2 (39.6)	−1.7 (28.9)	−9.6 (14.7)	1.6 (34.9)
Record low °C (°F)	−27.5 (−17.5)	−26.8 (−16.2)	−24.8 (−12.6)	−15.3 (4.5)	−3.1 (26.4)	1.7 (35.1)	6.8 (44.2)	7.0 (44.6)	0.2 (32.4)	−4.1 (24.6)	−14.9 (5.2)	−23.8 (−10.8)	−27.5 (−17.5)
Average precipitation mm (inches)	40.5 (1.59)	32.8 (1.29)	48.6 (1.91)	68.5 (2.70)	97.1 (3.82)	84.3 (3.32)	123.6 (4.87)	166.5 (6.56)	134.4 (5.29)	95.2 (3.75)	80.0 (3.15)	57.0 (2.24)	1,028.4 (40.49)
Average precipitation days (≥ 1.0 mm)	10.3	9.0	10.0	10.9	11.1	8.9	10.5	11.7	11.1	10.7	11.9	10.7	126.8
Mean monthly sunshine hours	138.9	132.9	163.9	167.7	182.5	146.5	118.8	138.2	158.1	153.9	119.8	113.7	1,735
Source: JMA

== Demographics ==
Per Japanese census data, the population of Atsuma has declined over the past half-century.

Historical population
Year	Pop.	±%
1970	7,916	—
1980	6,817	−13.9%
1990	6,183	−9.3%
2000	5,438	−12.0%
2010	4,890	−10.1%
2020	4,432	−9.4%

== History ==
In the middle of the 12th century, Northern Fujiwara supposedly had its trading post in Atsuma.

On 6 September 2018, Atsuma was the town hardest hit by the 2018 Hokkaido Eastern Iburi earthquake. It caused landslides that killed several of the town's residents when their homes were buried. A revitalization effort organized by the town since 2018 has attracted new residents, leading to an increase of the town's population.

== Education ==
Atsuma currently has a high school, called the Hokkaido Atsuma High School (北海道厚真高等学校, Hokkaidō Atsuma Kōtōgakkō). The town also has two junior high schools and two elementary schools.

== Transportation ==
=== Railway ===
- JR Hokkaido
  - Hidaka Main Line: Hama-Atsuma

=== Highways ===
- Hidaka Expressway
- National Route 235

=== Seaport ===
- Tomakomai East Port Shubun Ferry terminal (A Shin Nihonkai Ferry operates two ferries daily)
