= Japan National Route 235 =

National highway in Japan

National Route 235
- 国道235号
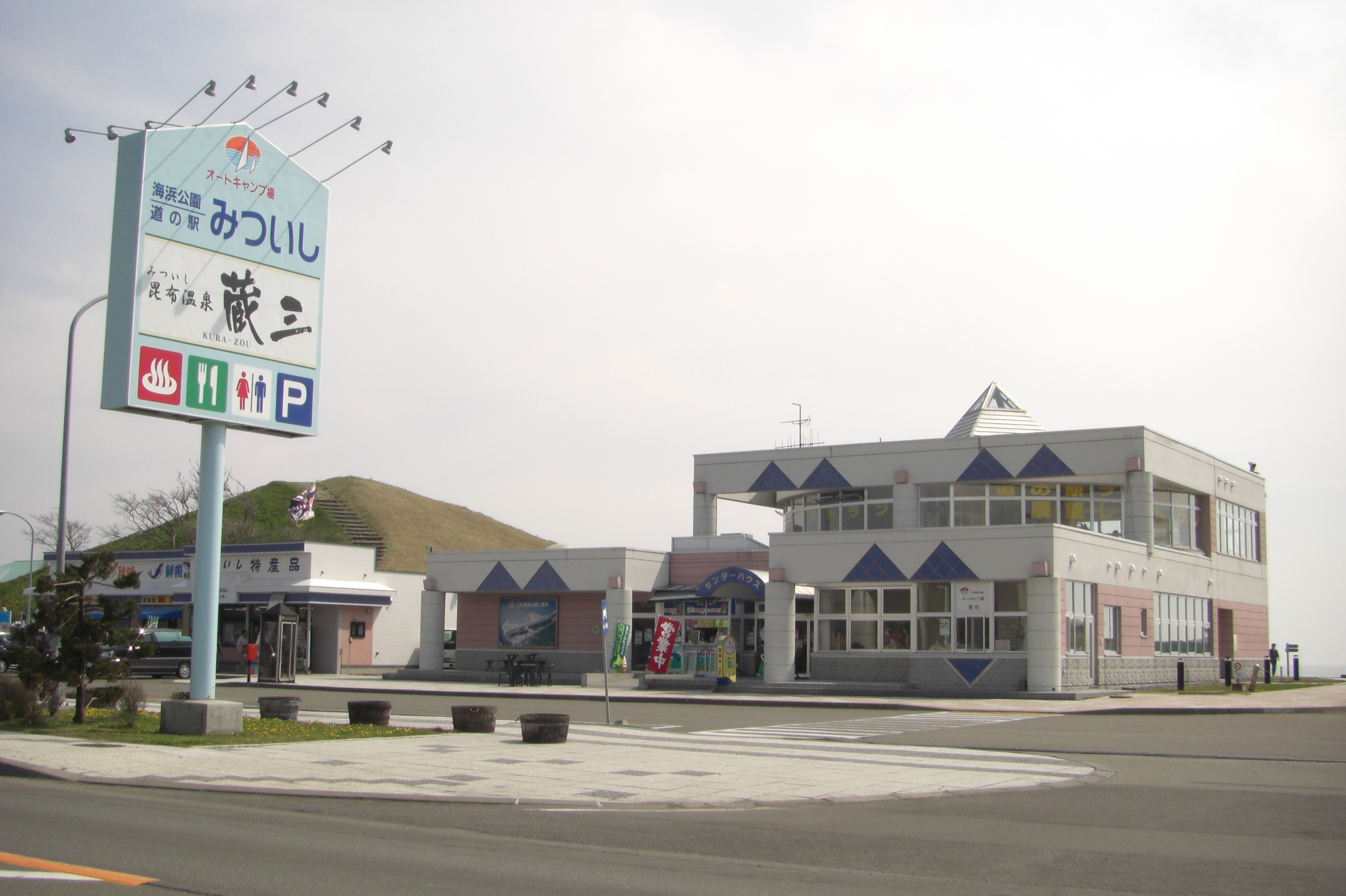
- Roadside Station in Shinhidaka along route 235.

Route information
- Length: 195.6 km (121.5 mi)
- Existed: 1965–present

Major junctions
- East end: Muroran, Hokkaido
- West end: Urakawa, Hokkaido

Location
- Country: Japan

Highway system
- National highways of Japan; Expressways of Japan
← National Route 234	→ National Route 236

National Route 235 (国道235号, Kokudō nihyakusanjūgo-gō) is a national highway connecting Muroran, Hokkaido and Urakawa, Hokkaido in Japan.

== Route description ==
- Length: 195.6 kilometers (121.5 mi)
- Origin: Muroran, Hokkaido
- Terminus: Urakawa, Hokkaido (Terminates at junction with National Route 236 and National Route 336
- Major cities: Muroran, Noboribetsu, Tomakomai

== History ==
- 18 May 1953: Second Class National Highway 235 from Muroran to Urakawa
- 1 April 1965: First Class National Highway 235

== Passes through ==
Hokkaidō Prefecture

Iburi Subprefecture

- Muroran, Hokkaidō
- Noboribetsu, Hokkaidō

Shiraoi District, Hokkaidō

- Shiraoi, Hokkaidō

- Tomakomai, Hokkaidō

Yūfutsu District, Hokkaidō

- Atsuma, Hokkaidō
- Mukawa, Hokkaidō

Hidaka Subprefecture

Saru District, Hokkaidō

- Hidaka, Hokkaidō

Niikappu District, Hokkaidō

- Niikappu, Hokkaidō

Hidaka District, Hokkaidō

- Shinhidaka, Hokkaidō

Urakawa District, Hokkaidō

- Urakawa, Hokkaidō
