= Hiroo, Hokkaido =

Town in Japan

Hiroo 広尾町 Hiroo-chō
- Town
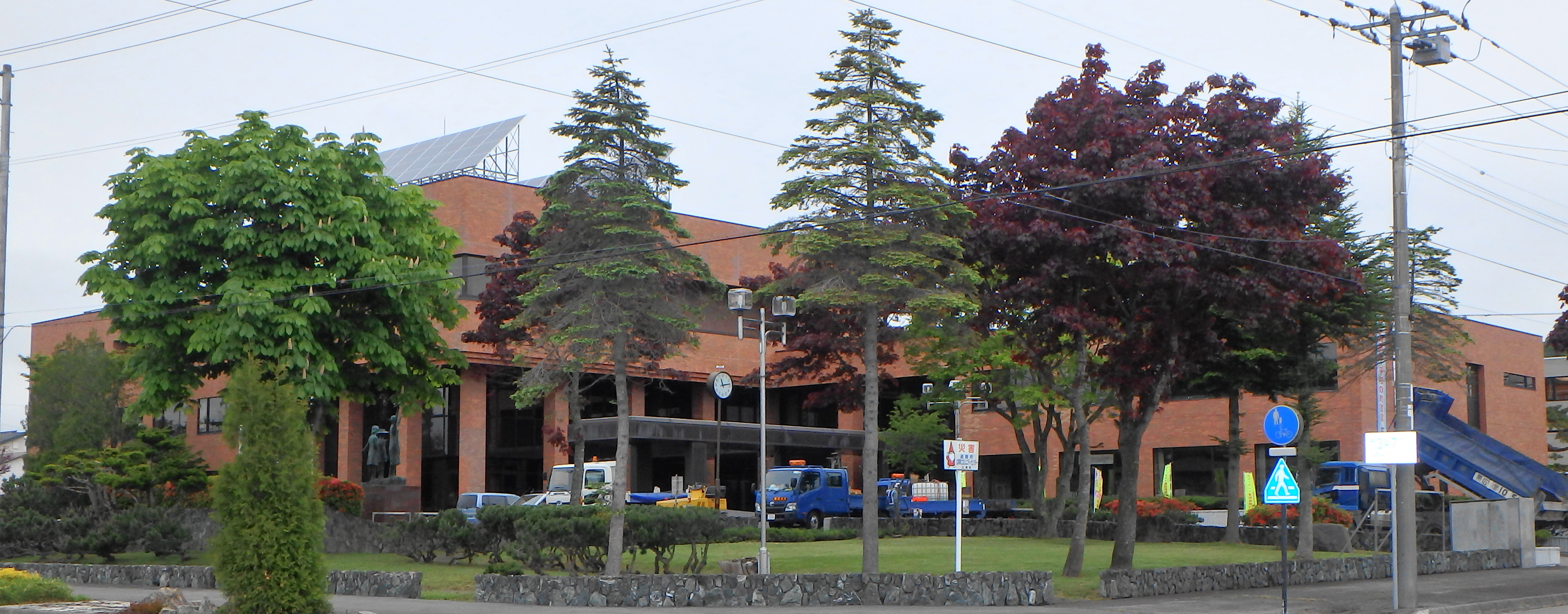
- Hiroo Town Hall

- Flag Emblem

- Location of Hiroo in Hokkaido (Tokachi Subprefecture)
- Interactive map of Hiroo
- Coordinates: 42°17′09″N 143°18′42″E
- Country: Japan
- Region: Hokkaido
- Prefecture: Hokkaido (Tokachi Subprefecture)
- District: Hiroo

Area
  - Total: 596.48 km^{2} (230.30 sq mi)

Population (November 30, 2025)
  - Total: 5,742
  - Density: 9.626/km^{2} (24.93/sq mi)
- Time zone: UTC+09:00 (JST)
- City hall address: 1-7-1 Nishi 4-jo, Hiroo-cho, Hiroo-gun, Hokkaido 089-2692
- Climate: Dfb
- Website: www.town.hiroo.lg.jp
- Symbols
- Flower: Azalea
- Tree: Japanese yew

Panorama view of downtown Hiroo and Pacific Ocean, from Maruyama Park

Hiroo (広尾町, Hiroo-chō) is a town located in Tokachi Subprefecture, Hokkaidō, Japan. As of 30 November 2025, the town had an estimated population of 5,742 in 3111 households, and a population density of 10 people per km^{2}. The total area of the town is 596.48 km^{2} (230.30 sq mi). Hiroo is recognized as the only place in Japan to be designated as a "Santa-Land" from the municipal government of Oslo, Norway.

== Geography ==
Hiroo is located in southern Hokkaido in the southernmost part of the Tokachi Subprefecture. The western part is mountainous and originates from the Hidaka Mountains, and is part of the Hidakasanmyaku-Erimo-Tokachi National Park. The eastern part borders the Pacific Ocean.

=== Neighboring municipalities ===
  - Taiki
  - Urakawa
  - Samani
  - Erimo

=== Climate ===
Although cold for its latitude and coastal position, the humid continental climate (Köppen Dfb) of Hiroo is moderated by East Asian standards. Summers are cooled by the ocean and cloudy weather, whereas the influence of the Siberian landmass drops temperatures in winter. Due to the ice-free nature of the ocean, Hiroo stays narrowly above freezing during days, whereas nights regularly drop beneath −10 °C (14 °F).

Climate data for Hiroo Special Regional Meteorological Observatory (32m above sea level, 1991-2020 normals, extremes 1958-present)
Month	Jan	Feb	Mar	Apr	May	Jun	Jul	Aug	Sep	Oct	Nov	Dec	Year
Record high °C (°F)	10.1 (50.2)	15.7 (60.3)	17.9 (64.2)	28.1 (82.6)	35.8 (96.4)	33.3 (91.9)	35.7 (96.3)	35.1 (95.2)	33.7 (92.7)	28.1 (82.6)	22.4 (72.3)	16.3 (61.3)	35.8 (96.4)
Mean maximum °C (°F)	5.8 (42.4)	7.5 (45.5)	12.4 (54.3)	20.5 (68.9)	26.5 (79.7)	27.3 (81.1)	29.6 (85.3)	31.1 (88.0)	28.1 (82.6)	22.3 (72.1)	18.1 (64.6)	10.0 (50.0)	32.0 (89.6)
Mean daily maximum °C (°F)	−0.3 (31.5)	0.0 (32.0)	4.0 (39.2)	9.9 (49.8)	14.6 (58.3)	16.5 (61.7)	20.1 (68.2)	22.1 (71.8)	20.3 (68.5)	15.5 (59.9)	9.4 (48.9)	2.6 (36.7)	11.2 (52.2)
Daily mean °C (°F)	−4.2 (24.4)	−3.9 (25.0)	0.1 (32.2)	5.2 (41.4)	9.8 (49.6)	12.7 (54.9)	16.6 (61.9)	18.6 (65.5)	16.6 (61.9)	11.3 (52.3)	5.2 (41.4)	−1.3 (29.7)	7.2 (45.0)
Mean daily minimum °C (°F)	−9.2 (15.4)	−9.1 (15.6)	−4.4 (24.1)	0.9 (33.6)	5.8 (42.4)	9.8 (49.6)	14.1 (57.4)	15.9 (60.6)	13.1 (55.6)	6.8 (44.2)	0.6 (33.1)	−5.8 (21.6)	3.2 (37.8)
Mean minimum °C (°F)	−15.4 (4.3)	−15.5 (4.1)	−11.2 (11.8)	−3.8 (25.2)	0.7 (33.3)	5.3 (41.5)	10.5 (50.9)	11.9 (53.4)	7.5 (45.5)	0.8 (33.4)	−5.5 (22.1)	−11.9 (10.6)	−16.3 (2.7)
Record low °C (°F)	−21.2 (−6.2)	−22.1 (−7.8)	−20.2 (−4.4)	−11.6 (11.1)	−2.6 (27.3)	1.0 (33.8)	4.0 (39.2)	8.4 (47.1)	1.6 (34.9)	−4.1 (24.6)	−11.6 (11.1)	−17.2 (1.0)	−22.1 (−7.8)
Average precipitation mm (inches)	71.6 (2.82)	59.9 (2.36)	95.1 (3.74)	111.3 (4.38)	162.4 (6.39)	149.2 (5.87)	166.2 (6.54)	217.7 (8.57)	262.6 (10.34)	194.2 (7.65)	127.7 (5.03)	91.4 (3.60)	1,709.2 (67.29)
Average snowfall cm (inches)	83 (33)	70 (28)	63 (25)	16 (6.3)	1 (0.4)	0 (0)	0 (0)	0 (0)	0 (0)	0 (0)	5 (2.0)	60 (24)	297 (117)
Average precipitation days (≥ 0.5 mm)	9.6	9.8	11.6	11.1	11.9	10.5	12.9	13.3	12.8	11.9	12.2	10.5	138.2
Average snowy days	17.4	18.1	18.9	8.9	0.9	0.0	0.0	0.0	0.0	0.6	6.8	16.6	88.6
Average relative humidity (%)	64	65	66	70	77	87	89	88	82	74	65	63	74
Mean monthly sunshine hours	166.1	162.3	186.1	181.8	173.1	126.7	108.3	113.9	134.5	164.5	149.2	149.4	1,815.8
Source 1: JMA
Source 2: JMA

=== Demographics ===
Per Japanese census data, the population of Hiroo has declined in recent decades.

Historical population
Year	Pop.	±%
1970	13,436	—
1980	11,512	−14.3%
1990	10,346	−10.1%
2000	8,975	−13.3%
2010	7,884	−12.2%
2020	6,387	−19.0%

== History ==
The area flourished from the Jomon period. A settlement of Ainu people existed along the southeast Hiroo River. It was part of Matsumae Domain in the Edo period and was on a road opened by the Tokugawa shogunate along the coast to Kushiro. It was the site of a jin'ya established to govern the entire Tokachi Province. During the Bakumatsu period in 1858, it was awarded to Sendai Domain, which relocated farmers, carpenters, and woodsmen to the area and began cultivating grain and vegetables. In 1906, the village of Moyori was established under the second-class town and village system. Its name was changed to Hiroo Village in 1926, and was elevated to town status in 1946.

The 2011 Tohoku earthquake and tsunami resulted in a 2.8m tsunami striking Hiroo, causing over 1 billion yen in damage.

== Government ==
Hiroo has a mayor-council form of government with a directly elected mayor and a unicameral town council of 13 members. Hiroo, as part of Tokachi Subprefecture, contributes four members to the Hokkaidō Prefectural Assembly. In terms of national politics, the town is part of the Hokkaidō 11th district of the lower house of the Diet of Japan.

== Economy ==
The main economic activities of Hiroo are commercial fishing, agriculture (field crops), and dairy farming. Tokachi Port (a nationally important port) is located here.

== Education ==
Hiroo has two public elementary schools and one public middle school operated by the town. The town has one public high school operated by the Hokkaido Board of Education.

== Transportation ==
=== Railways ===
Hiroo has not had any passenger railway services since the closure of the JR Hokkaido Hiroo Line in February 1987. The closest railway stations are Obihiro Station and Samani Station, each of which are two hours away by car or bus.

=== Highways ===
- Obihiro-Hiroo Expressway
- National Route 236
- National Route 336

=== Seaports ===
- Port of Tokachi, located in Hiroo, is a major shipping port for the Tokachi area. Customs facilities opened at the port in 1999, and a Marubeni-led consortium opened Hokkaido's largest feed terminal facility at the port in 2010.

== Sister city relations ==
- Frogn, Akershus, Norway (Friendship city)

== Local attractions ==
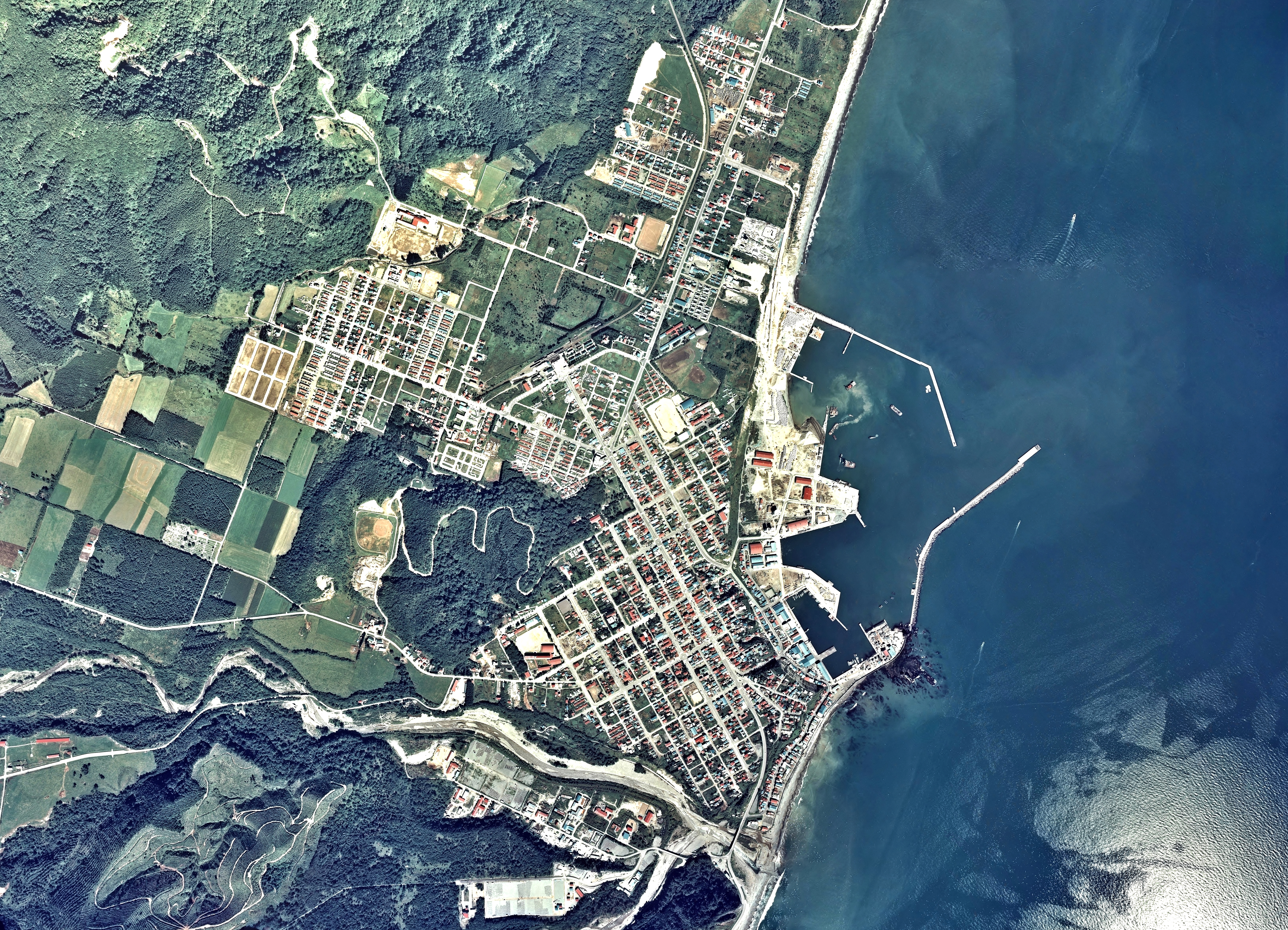
Hiroo town center area Aerial photograph

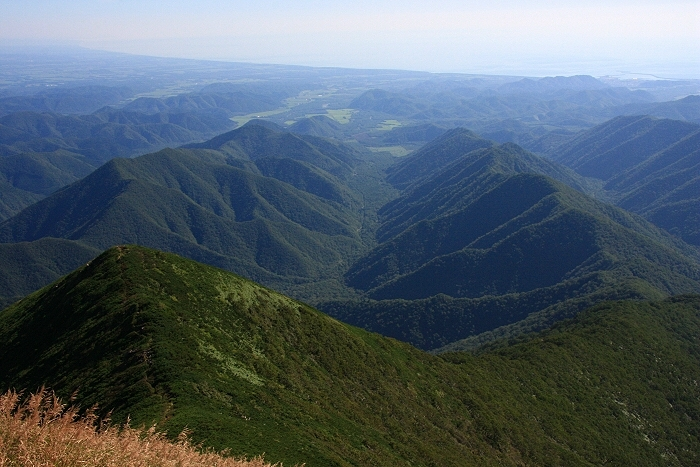
Mount Rakko

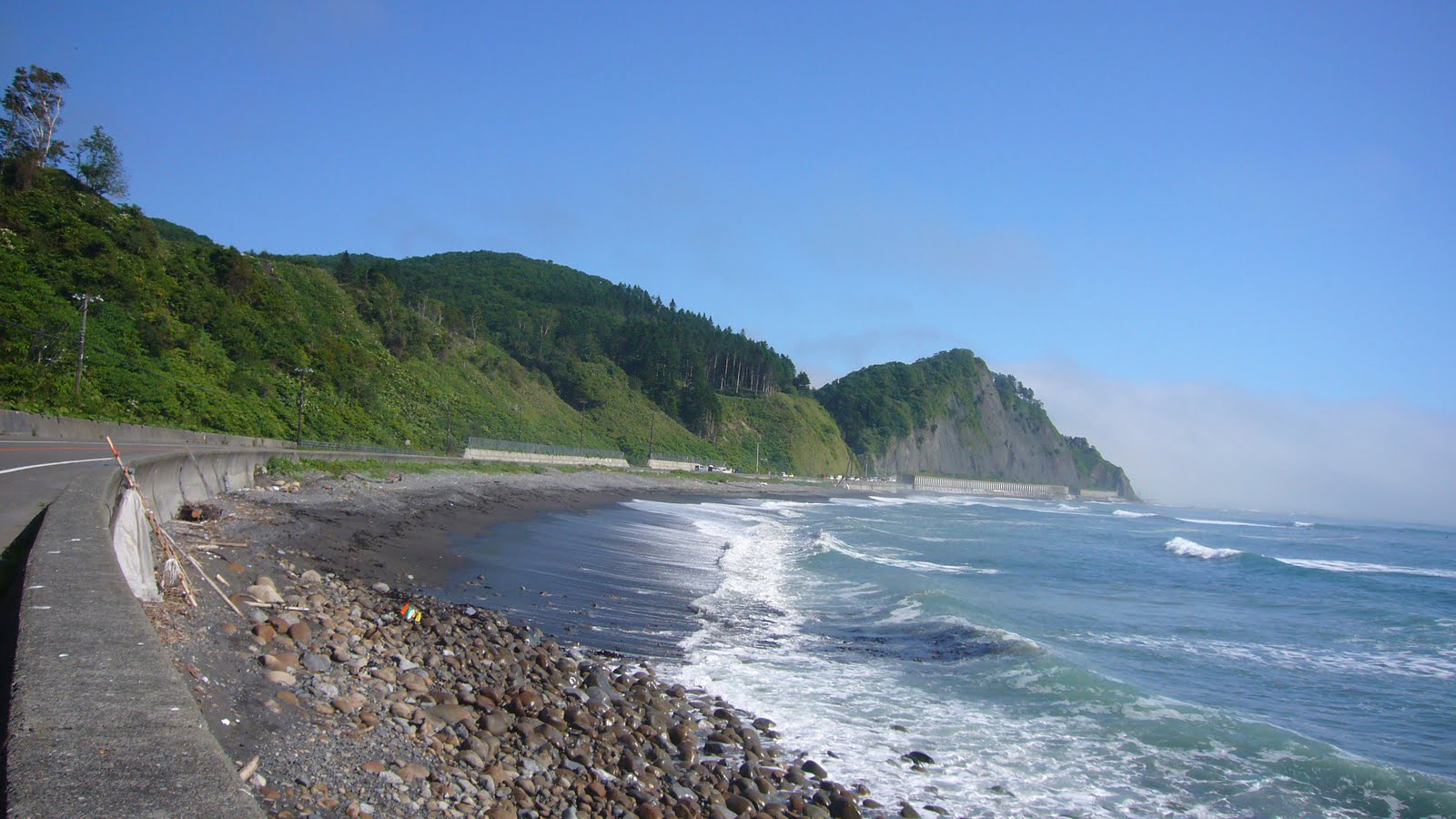
Coastal road in Hiroo

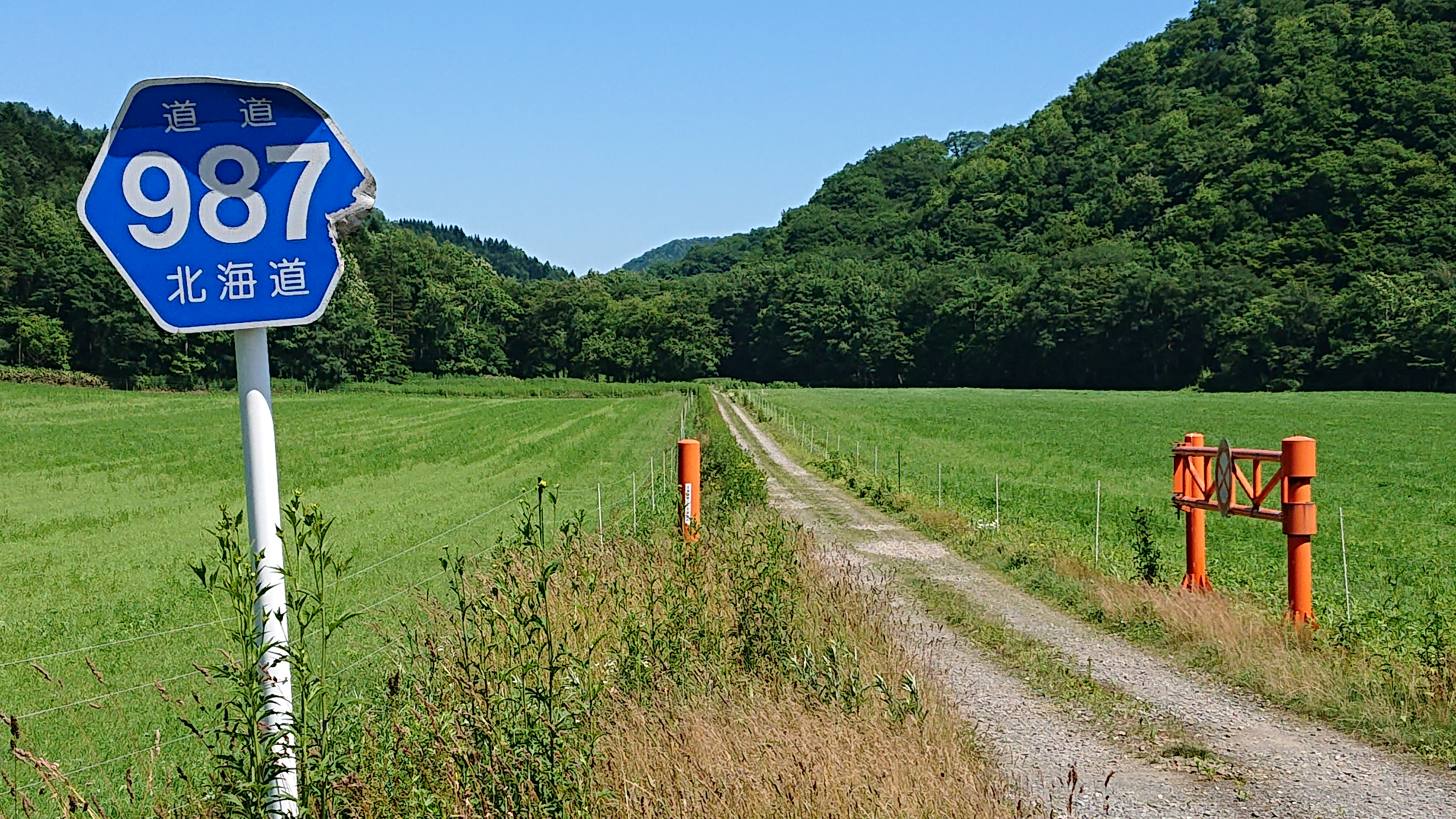
Hokkaido Route 987 in Hiroo

== Notable people from Hiroo ==
- Ichiro Nakagawa, politician
- Yoshio Nakagawa, politician
- Hokutoumi Nobuyoshi, former Yokozuna and chairman of the Japan Sumo Association

=== Mascots ===
Sata-chan and Tree-kun, the town's mascots

Hiroo's mascots are Sata-chan (さーたちゃん) and Tree-kun (ツリーくん, Tsurī-kun).

- Sata-chan is supposed to be a granddaughter of Santa Claus. Her story is that she wants to become his successor. To do this, she must start practicing with the small town of Hiroo. She lives at Santaland. Her birthday is October 26. Her character was unveiled in 2013 and became a town mascot on November 12, 2014. She was designed by a first grade student at Hiroo Elementary School.
- Tree-kun is a Christmas tree. He was unveiled in 1995. His character joins Sata-chan to search for Bell-kun (ベルくん, Beru-kun) who has been missing for years. He resides in Daimaruyama Forest Park. As Sata-chan's assistant, he is in charge of collecting energy.
