= Japan National Route 337 =

National highway in Japan

National Route 337
- 国道337号

Route information
- Length: 92.4 km (57.4 mi)

Location
- Country: Japan

Highway system
- National highways of Japan; Expressways of Japan
← National Route 336	→ National Route 338

National Route 337 is a national highway of Japan connecting Chitose, Hokkaidō and Otaru, Hokkaidō in Japan, with a total length of 92.4 km (57.41 mi).
