= Samani District, Hokkaido =

District in Hokkaido, Japan

Coordinates: 42.181°N 143.028°E

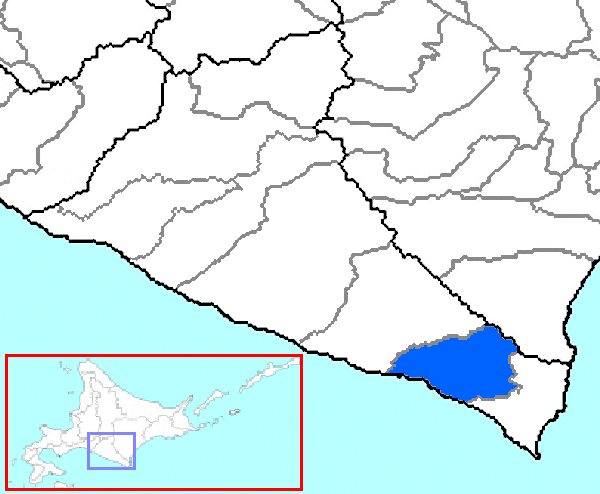
The area of Samani Districts in Hidaka Subprefecture.

Samani (様似郡, Samani-gun) is a district located in Hidaka Subprefecture, Hokkaido, Japan. It is located south east of Hidaka mountain range.

As of 2004, the district has an estimated population of 5,770 and a density of 15.84 persons per km^{2}. The population decreased to 4043 in 2020. The total area is 364.33 km^{2}. The town has a UNESCO global geopark, Samani Town. It is a two-hour drive from Obihiro Airport.

== Towns and villages ==
- Samani
