= Horoizumi District, Hokkaido =

District in Hokkaido, Japan

Coordinates: 42.074°N 143.226°E

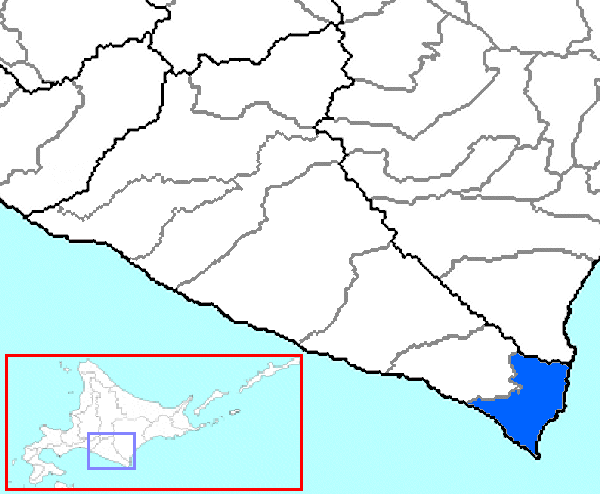
The area of Horoizumi Districts in Hidaka Subprefecture.

Horoizumi (幌泉郡, Horoizumi-gun) is a district located in Hidaka Subprefecture, Hokkaido, Japan.

As of April 2025, the district has an estimated population of 3,961. The total area is 284 km^{2}.

== Towns and villages ==
- Erimo
