= Urakawa, Hokkaido =

Urakawa 浦河町 Urakawa-chō
- Town
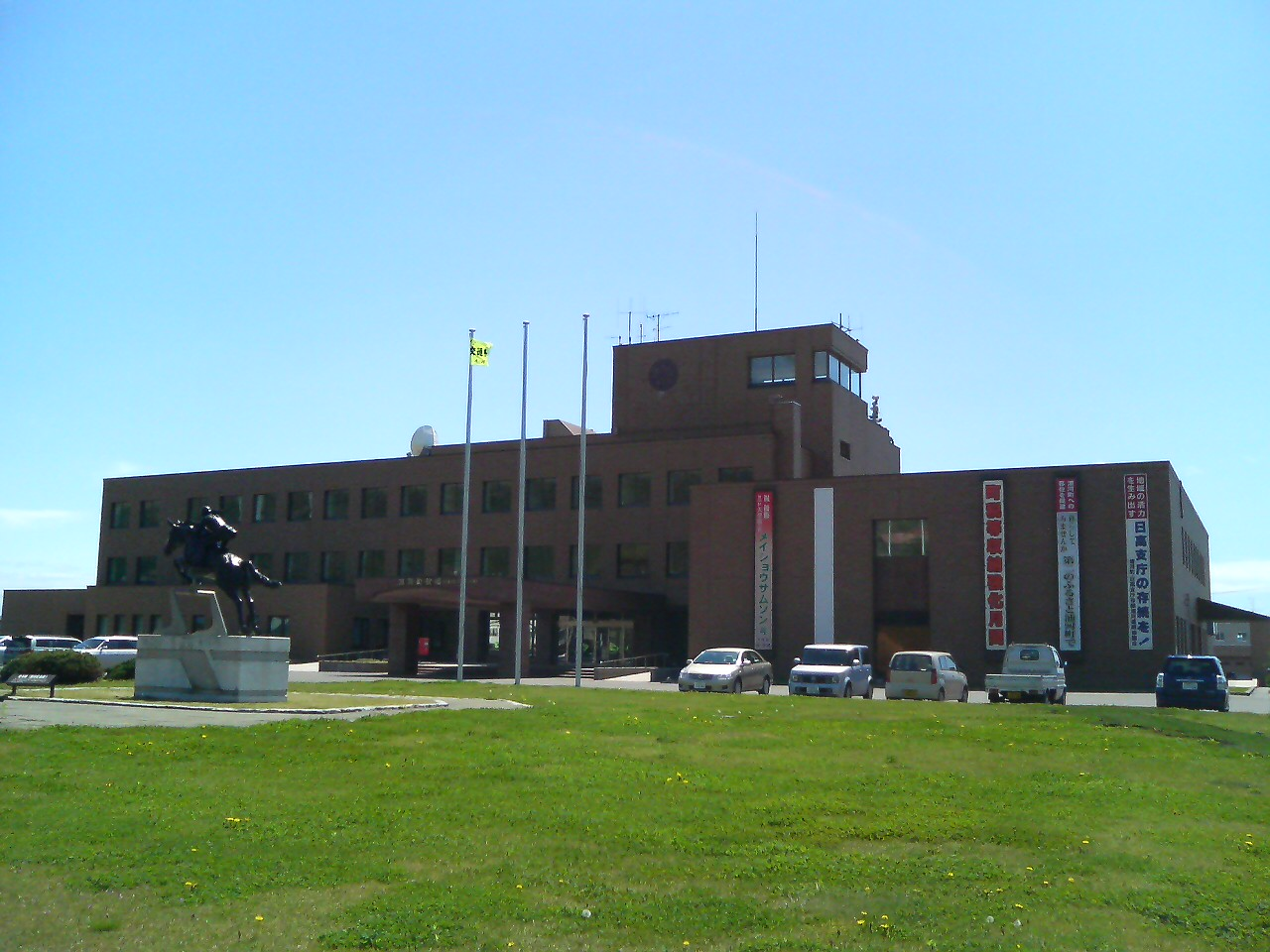
- Urakawa Town Hall

- Flag Seal

- Location of Urakawa in Hokkaido (Hidaka Subprefecture)
- Interactive map of Urakawa
- Coordinates: 42°10′06″N 142°46′06″E
- Country: Japan
- Region: Hokkaido
- Prefecture: Hokkaido (Hidaka Subprefecture)
- District: Urakawa

Government
  - Mayor: Kōichirō Tanikawa

Area
  - Total: 694.30 km^{2} (268.07 sq mi)

Population (31 December 2025)
  - Total: 11,048
  - Density: 15.912/km^{2} (41.213/sq mi)
- Time zone: UTC+09:00 (JST)
- City hall address: 1-3-1, Tsukiji, Urakawa-chō, Urakawa-gun, Hokkaidō 057-8511
- Climate: Cfb
- Website: www.town.urakawa.hokkaido.jp
- Symbols
- Flower: Hidaka Yamatsutsuji (Rhododendron kaempferi var. kaempferi)
- Mascot: Uraran (うららん) and Kawatan (かわたん)
- Tree: Hidaka Japanese white pine

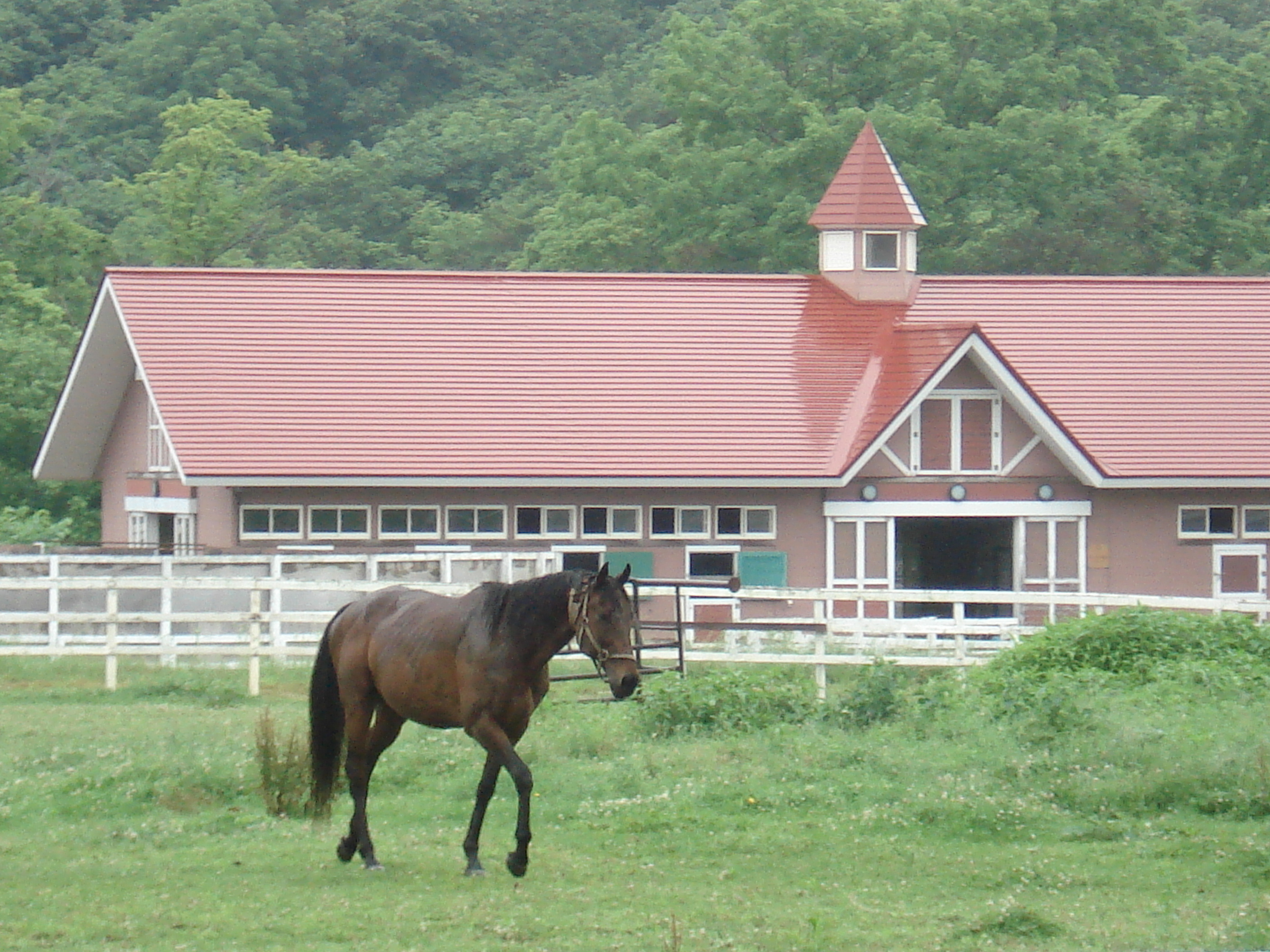
Horse ranch in Urakawa

Urakawa (浦河町, Urakawa-chō) is a town located in Hidaka Subprefecture, Hokkaidō, Japan. As of 31 December 2025, the town had an estimated population of 11,048 in 6628 households, and a population density of 16 people per km^{2}. The total area of the town is 694.30 km^{2} (268.07 sq mi).

== Geography ==
Urakawa is located in southern Hokkaido, in the central coastal area of the Hidaka Subprefecture. The mountainous area in the north, derived from the Hidaka Mountains, is designated as the Hidakasanmyaku-Erimo-Tokachi National Park. The southern part faces the Pacific Ocean. Earthquakes are relatively frequent in this region, and the Urakawa Meteorological Observatory (closed in October 2009) was the only place within the Hidaka region where seismic intensity information was available.

=== Neighboring municipalities ===
- Shinhidaka
- Samani
- Taiki
- Hiroo

=== Climate ===
Urakawa has a humid continental climate (Köppen Dfb) with warm summers and cold winters. With an alternate definition, using the −3 °C (27 °F) isotherm, Urakawa falls in the rare oceanic climate (Cfb) of the east coast of the continents due to the warm current of Tsushima. Owing to its slightly more southerly latitude, easterly aspect and location on the sea, snowfall is much lighter than in the major cities of western Hokkaido like Sapporo, Hakodate, Asahikawa and Wakkanai, with the most in one month being 0.98 metres (38.6 in) in January 1969. Precipitation in heaviest in the summer months when remnant typhoons may approach; the heaviest daily rainfall being 190.0 millimetres (7.48 in) on 5 August 1981, and the wettest month being 429.5 millimetres (16.91 in) in August 1995. The driest month has been 2.5 millimetres (0.10 in) in February 2003. Year-round sunshine, although less than in the Tokachi Plain, is also higher than western Hokkaido, with the dullest month being 48.0 hours in August 1941 and the sunniest, in April 2014, being 288.0 hours, which beats the previous record of 271.6 hours in May 1957.

Climate data for Urakawa (1991−2020 normals, extremes 1927−present)
Month	Jan	Feb	Mar	Apr	May	Jun	Jul	Aug	Sep	Oct	Nov	Dec	Year
Record high °C (°F)	10.9 (51.6)	13.6 (56.5)	16.5 (61.7)	22.2 (72.0)	23.5 (74.3)	27.2 (81.0)	30.7 (87.3)	31.5 (88.7)	29.9 (85.8)	23.7 (74.7)	19.1 (66.4)	14.3 (57.7)	31.5 (88.7)
Mean maximum °C (°F)	6.0 (42.8)	6.4 (43.5)	10.5 (50.9)	16.1 (61.0)	19.7 (67.5)	22.4 (72.3)	25.9 (78.6)	27.1 (80.8)	25.7 (78.3)	20.9 (69.6)	16.1 (61.0)	10.6 (51.1)	27.6 (81.7)
Mean daily maximum °C (°F)	0.9 (33.6)	1.2 (34.2)	4.4 (39.9)	8.9 (48.0)	13.5 (56.3)	16.9 (62.4)	20.7 (69.3)	23.0 (73.4)	21.4 (70.5)	16.2 (61.2)	9.8 (49.6)	3.6 (38.5)	11.7 (53.1)
Daily mean °C (°F)	−2.4 (27.7)	−2.1 (28.2)	0.9 (33.6)	5.2 (41.4)	9.7 (49.5)	13.5 (56.3)	17.7 (63.9)	19.9 (67.8)	17.7 (63.9)	12.3 (54.1)	6.1 (43.0)	0.1 (32.2)	8.2 (46.8)
Mean daily minimum °C (°F)	−5.7 (21.7)	−5.6 (21.9)	−2.5 (27.5)	1.8 (35.2)	6.4 (43.5)	10.7 (51.3)	15.3 (59.5)	17.4 (63.3)	14.4 (57.9)	8.3 (46.9)	2.5 (36.5)	−3.1 (26.4)	5.0 (41.0)
Mean minimum °C (°F)	−10.7 (12.7)	−10.7 (12.7)	−7.5 (18.5)	−2.2 (28.0)	1.7 (35.1)	6.5 (43.7)	11.5 (52.7)	13.0 (55.4)	8.9 (48.0)	2.3 (36.1)	−3.6 (25.5)	−8.1 (17.4)	−11.5 (11.3)
Record low °C (°F)	−15.5 (4.1)	−14.8 (5.4)	−13.1 (8.4)	−8.1 (17.4)	−2.5 (27.5)	2.3 (36.1)	6.5 (43.7)	8.9 (48.0)	1.9 (35.4)	−1.3 (29.7)	−7.9 (17.8)	−13.1 (8.4)	−15.5 (4.1)
Average precipitation mm (inches)	34.0 (1.34)	28.9 (1.14)	48.8 (1.92)	77.9 (3.07)	125.3 (4.93)	95.9 (3.78)	141.5 (5.57)	161.6 (6.36)	144.4 (5.69)	117.7 (4.63)	83.4 (3.28)	59.0 (2.32)	1,118.4 (44.03)
Average snowfall cm (inches)	41 (16)	35 (14)	19 (7.5)	1 (0.4)	0 (0)	0 (0)	0 (0)	0 (0)	0 (0)	0 (0)	4 (1.6)	28 (11)	128 (50.5)
Average precipitation days (≥ 1.0 mm)	7.7	6.7	7.4	9.4	10.4	8.6	10.7	10.1	10.0	10.8	12.1	11.0	114.9
Average snowy days	11.7	10.1	5.1	0.5	0	0	0	0	0	0	1.3	8.2	36.9
Average relative humidity (%)	65	68	72	78	83	90	92	90	84	75	69	65	78
Mean monthly sunshine hours	142.0	160.8	194.2	187.9	187.2	145.0	115.6	136.0	163.4	172.2	121.7	113.2	1,839.2
Source 1: Japan Meteorological Agency (precipitation)
Source 2: Japan Meteorological Agency

=== Demographics ===
Per Japanese census data, the population of Urakawa has declined in recent decades.

Historical population
Year	Pop.	±%
1970	20,922	—
1980	19,408	−7.2%
1990	17,862	−8.0%
2000	16,634	−6.9%
2010	14,353	−13.7%
2020	12,074	−15.9%

== History ==
The area of Urakawa has been inhabited since the Jomon period. In the Edo period, Matsumae Domain is recorded to have built a Shinto shrine in what is now Urakawa in 1669. The Tokugawa shogunate established a horse ranch in 1858. More Japanese settlers arrived in the early Meiji period, and Urakawa was established as a village in 1902 under the second-class town and village system. Urakawa merged with two neighboring villages to form Urakawa Town in 1915.

== Government ==
Urakawa has a mayor-council form of government with a directly elected mayor and a unicameral town council of 14 members. Urakawa, as part of Hidaka Subprefecture, contributes two members to the Hokkaidō Prefectural Assembly. In terms of national politics, the town is part of the Hokkaidō 9th district of the lower house of the Diet of Japan.

== Economy ==
The local economy is overwhelmingly agricultural, horse breeding and commercial fishing.

== Education ==
Urakawa has four public elementary schools and one public middle school operated by the town. The town has one public high school operated by the Hokkaido Board of Education. The town also has one vocational training school for nursing.

== Transportation ==
=== Railways ===
Urakawa was served by the JR Hokkaido Hidaka Main Line. However, no trains have operated between Mukawa and Samani since January 2015, due to storm damage. Plans to restore this section of the line have been abandoned, due to declining passenger numbers and very high maintenance costs, and the section was officially closed on 1 April 2021, and replaced by a bus service.

Defunct railway stations in Urakawa: Ogifushi - Efue - Urakawa - Higashichō - Hidaka-Horobetsu

=== Highways ===
- National Route 235
- National Route 236
- National Route 237
- National Route 336

== Local attractions ==
- Urakawa Town Museum
- Urakawa Shrine
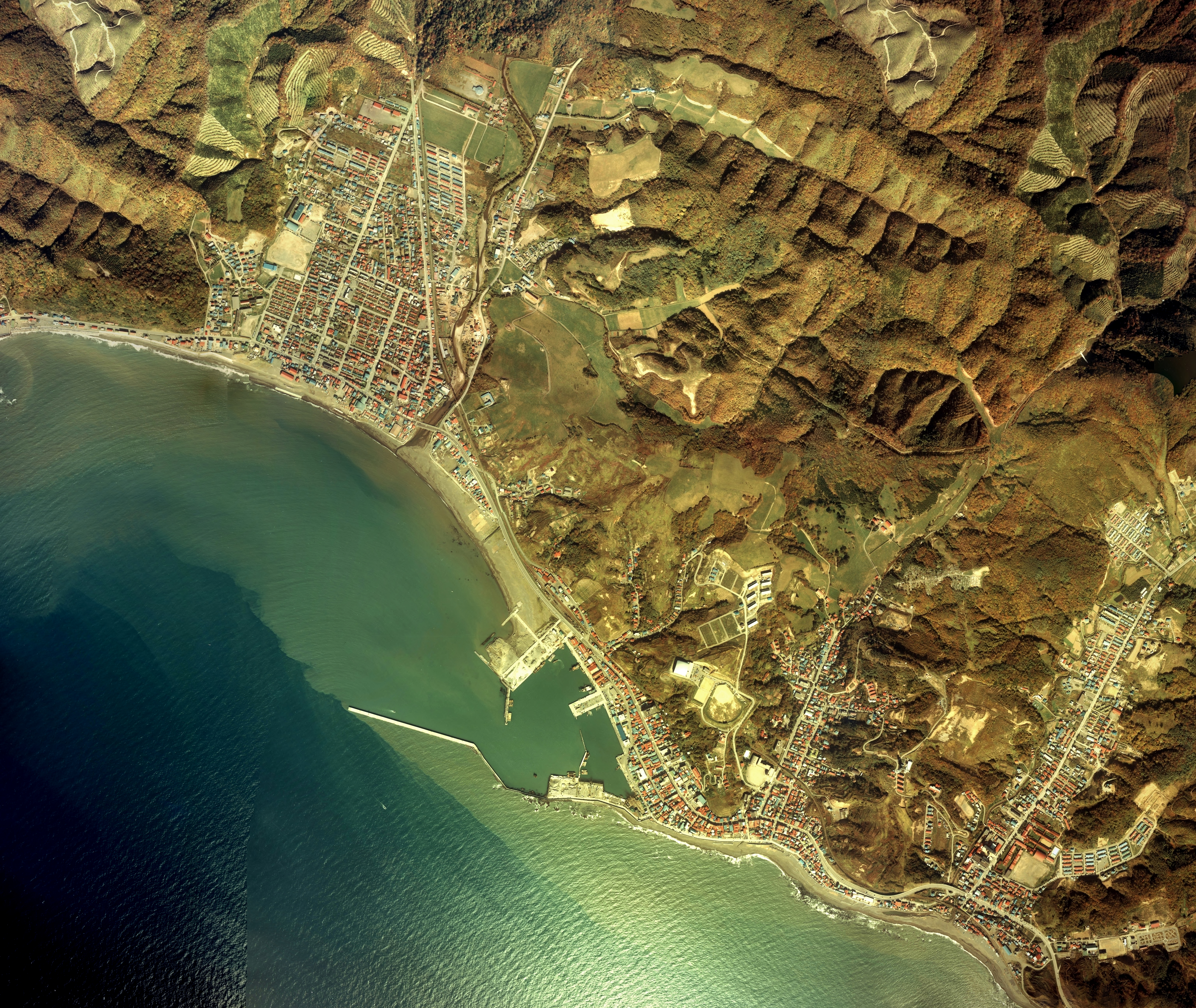
Urakawa town center area Aerial photograph

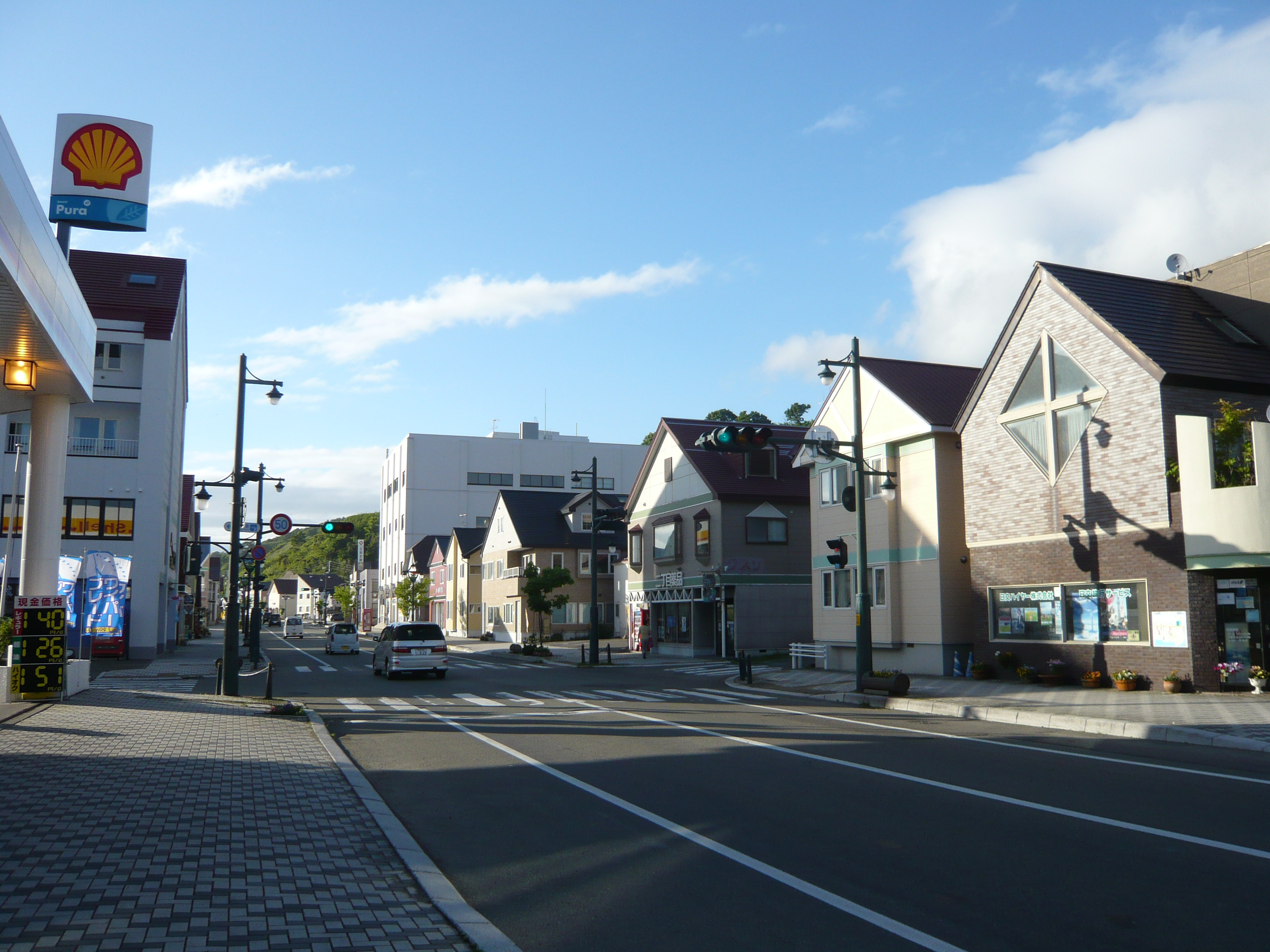
Downtown Urakawa

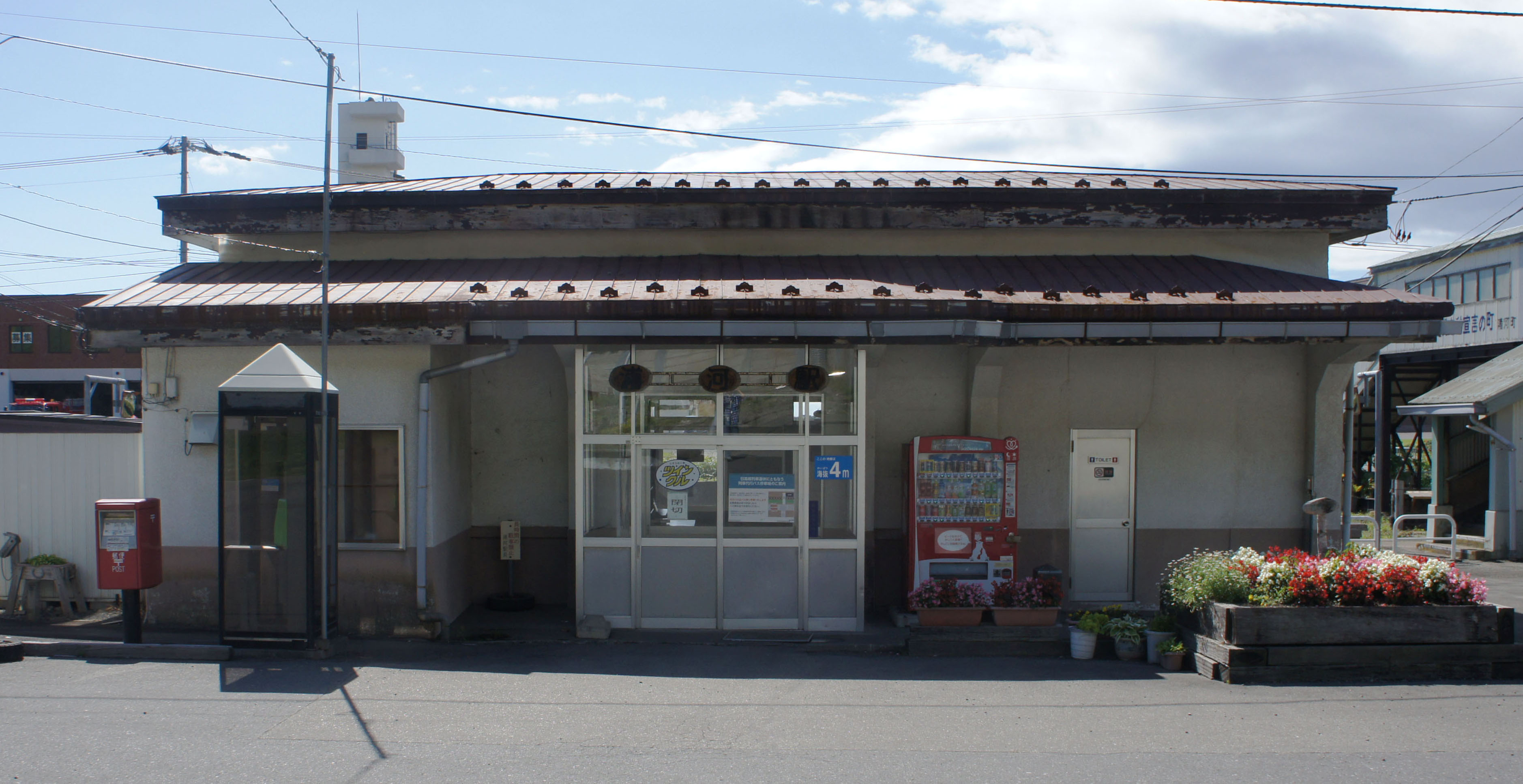
former Urakawa Station

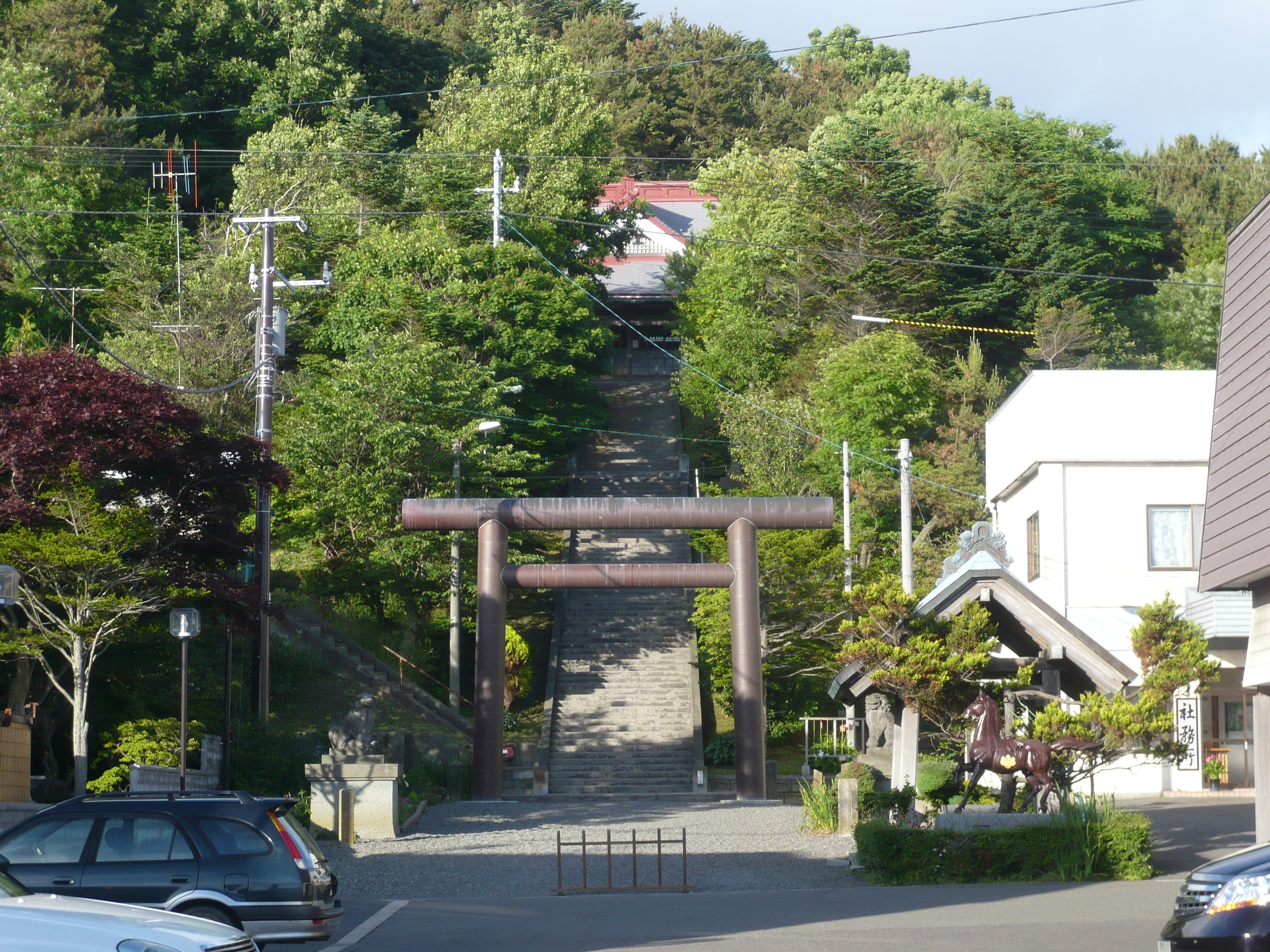
Urakawa Jinja

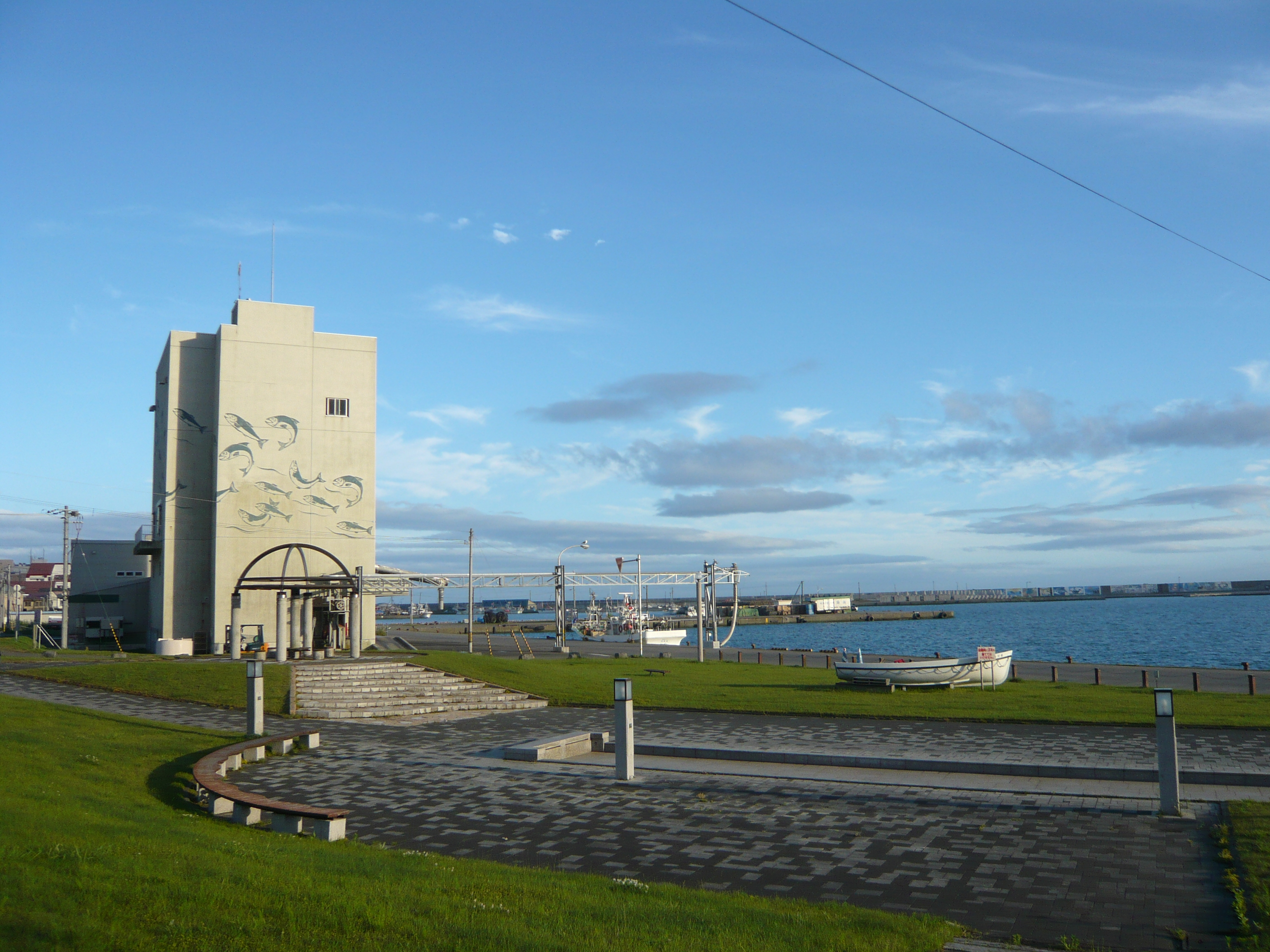
Urakawa Port

== Culture ==
=== Mascot ===
Uraran and Kawatan, the town's mascots

Urakawa's mascots are Uraran (うららん) and Kawatan (かわたん). They are twin horses.

- Uraran carries a strawberry.
- Kawatan carries a Hidaka kelp and a Ginsei salmon.

== Notable people from Biratori ==
- Shigeru Kayano (1926–2006), leading figure in the Ainu ethnic movement.
- Ryo Fukui (1948–2016), jazz pianist.
