= Urakawa District, Hokkaido =

District in Hokkaido, Japan

Coordinates: 42.283°N 142.871°E

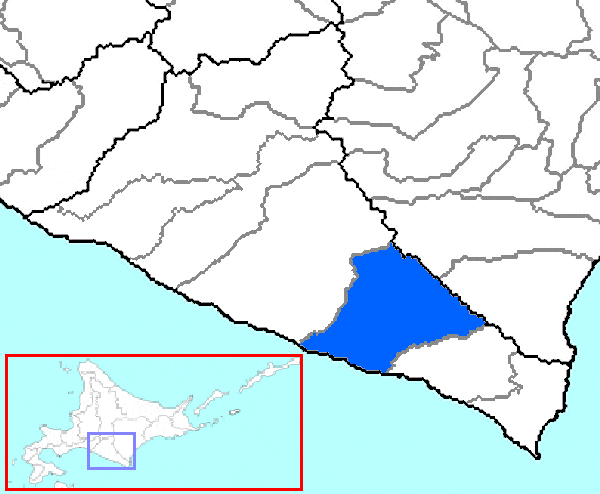
The area of Urakawa District in Hidaka Subprefecture.

Urakawa (浦河郡, Urakawa-gun) is a district located in Hidaka Subprefecture, Hokkaido, Japan.

As of 2004, the district has an estimated population of 15,986 and a density of 23.03 persons per km^{2}. The total area is 694.23 km^{2}.

== Towns and villages ==
- Urakawa
