= Iburi Subprefecture =

Iburi Subprefecture 胆振総合振興局
- Iburi-sōgō-shinkō-kyoku
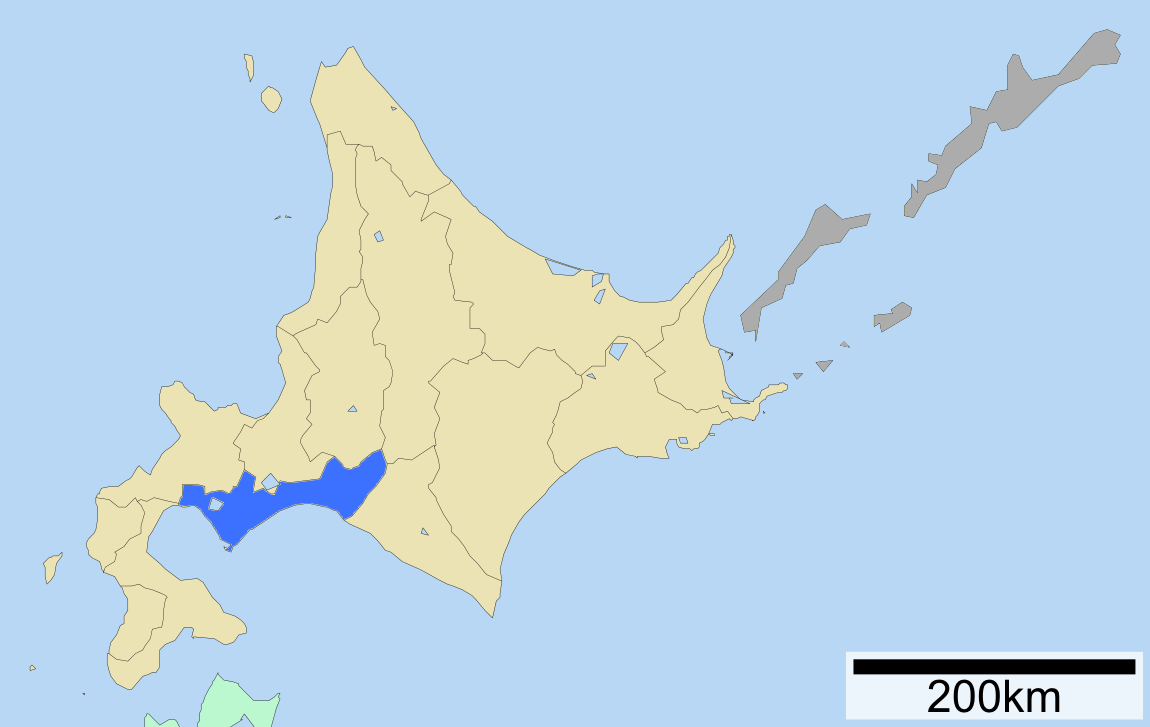
- Prefecture: Hokkaido
- Capital: Muroran

Area
  - Total: 3,698.00 km^{2} (1,427.81 sq mi)

Population (March 2009)
  - Total: 426,627
  - Density: 115.367/km^{2} (298.799/sq mi)
- Website: iburi.pref.hokkaido.lg.jp

Iburi Subprefecture

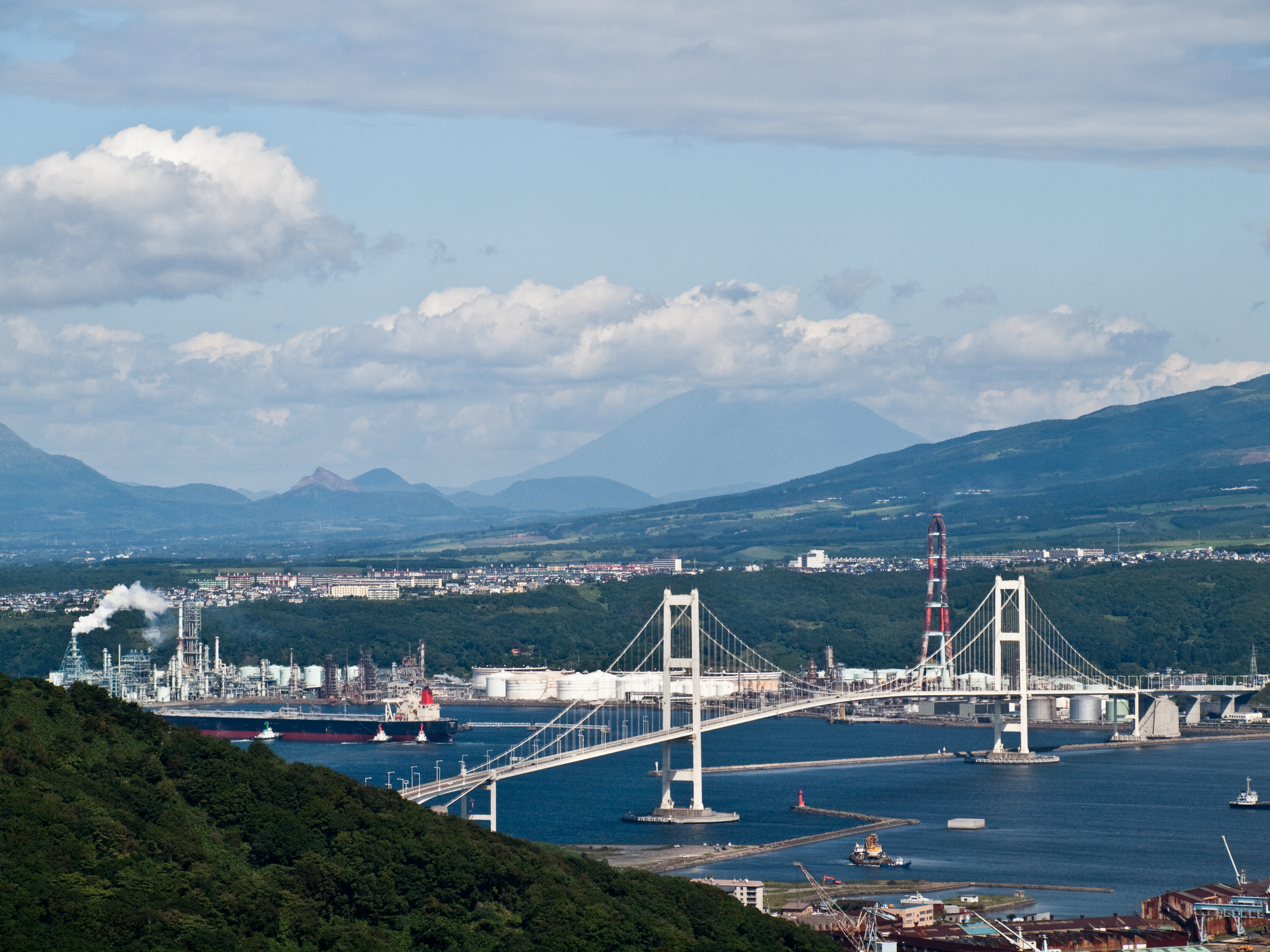
Muroran

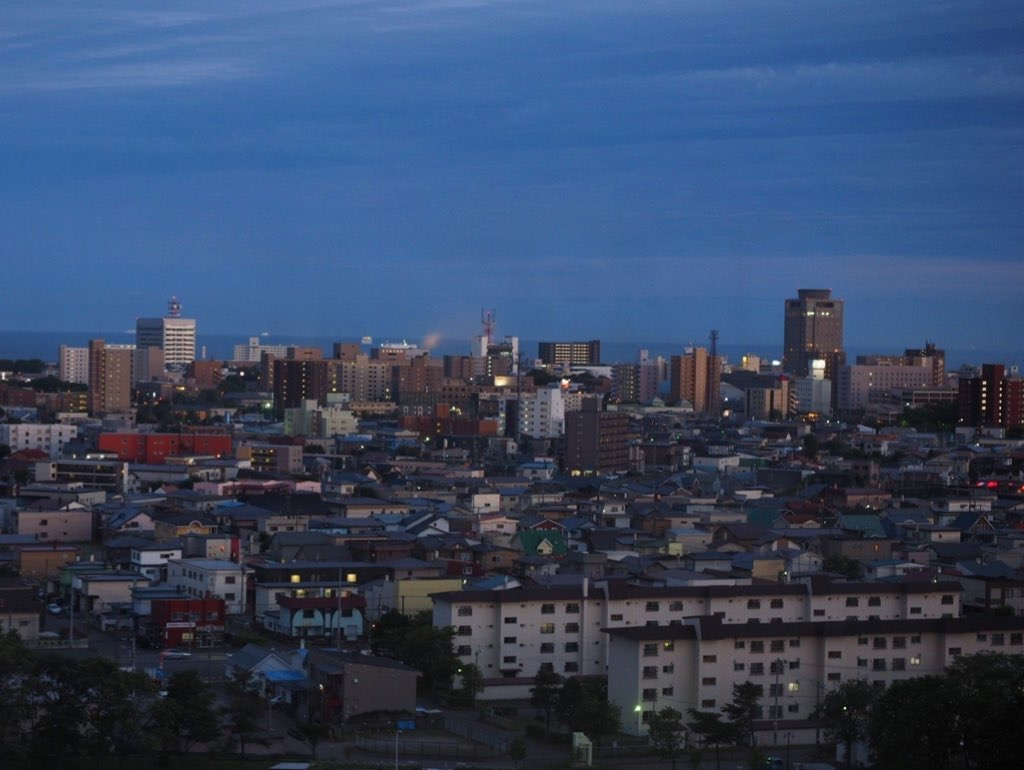
Tomakomai

Iburi Subprefecture (胆振総合振興局, Iburi-sōgō-shinkō-kyoku) is a subprefecture of Hokkaido Prefecture, Japan.

== Geography ==
Located in south-central Hokkaido, Iburi stretches 152 kilometres (94 mi) East-West and 98 kilometres (61 mi) North-South. Iburi covers an area of 9698 km2 9,698 square kilometres (3,744 sq mi). Iburi borders Oshima Subprefecture to the West, Shiribeshi, Ishikari, and Sorachi Subprefectures to the North, and Hidaka Subprefecture to the East. On its South side, Iburi has 218 kilometres (135 mi) of coastline with the Pacific Ocean.

=== Municipalities ===
Name		Area (km^{2})	Population	District	Type	Map
Rōmaji	Kanji	Area (km^{2})	Population	District	Type	Map
Abira	安平町	237.13	8,323	Yūfutsu District	Town	
Atsuma	厚真町	404.56	4,659	Yūfutsu District	Town	
Date	伊達市	444.28	34,898	no district	City	
Mukawa	むかわ町	166.43	8,527	Yūfutsu District	Town	
Muroran (capital)	室蘭市	80.65	93,716	no district	City	
Noboribetsu	登別市	212.11	49,523	no district	City	
Shiraoi	白老町	425.75	17,759	Shiraoi District	Town	
Sōbetsu	壮瞥町	205.04	2,665	Usu District	Town	
Tomakomai	苫小牧市	561.49	174,216	no district	City	
Tōyako	洞爺湖町	180.54	9,231	Abuta District	Town	
Toyoura	豊浦町	233.54	4,205	Abuta District	Town	

== History ==
- 1897: Muroran Subprefecture was established.
- 1922: Muroran Subprefecture was renamed Iburi Subprefecture.
