= Hidaka Subprefecture =

Coordinates: 42°10′21″N 142°46′05″E

Hidaka Subprefecture 日高振興局
- Hidaka-shinkō-kyoku
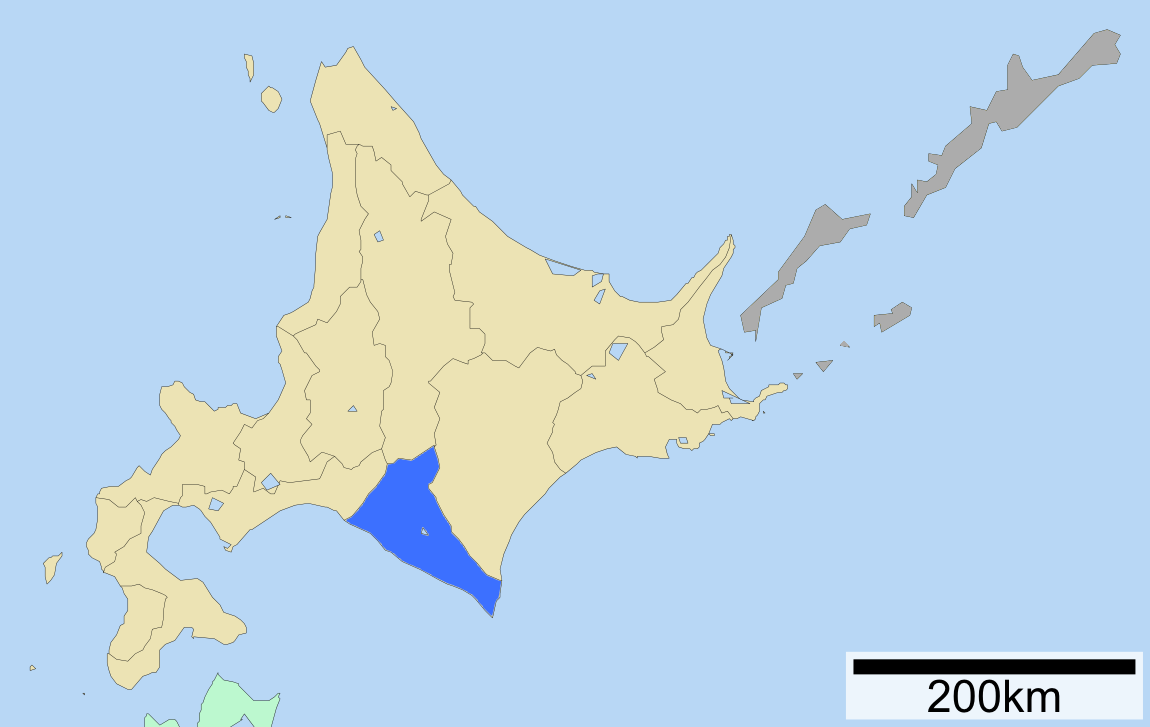
- Prefecture: Hokkaido
- Capital: Urakawa

Area
  - Total: 4,811.91 km^{2} (1,857.89 sq mi)

Population (March 2009)
  - Total: 81,403
  - Density: 17/km^{2} (44/sq mi)
- Website: http://www.hidaka.pref.hokkaido.lg.jp/

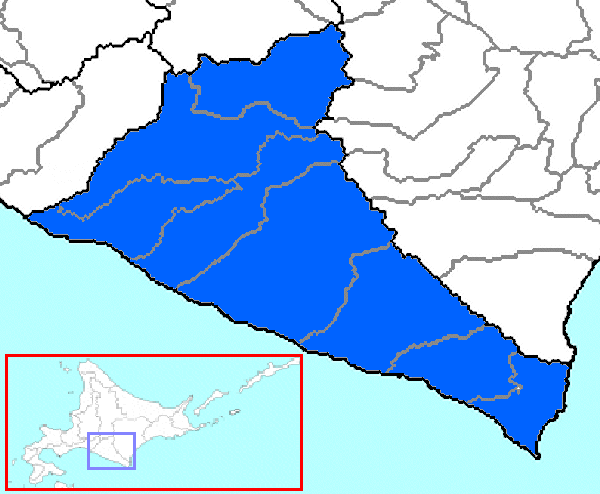
Hidaka Subprefecture

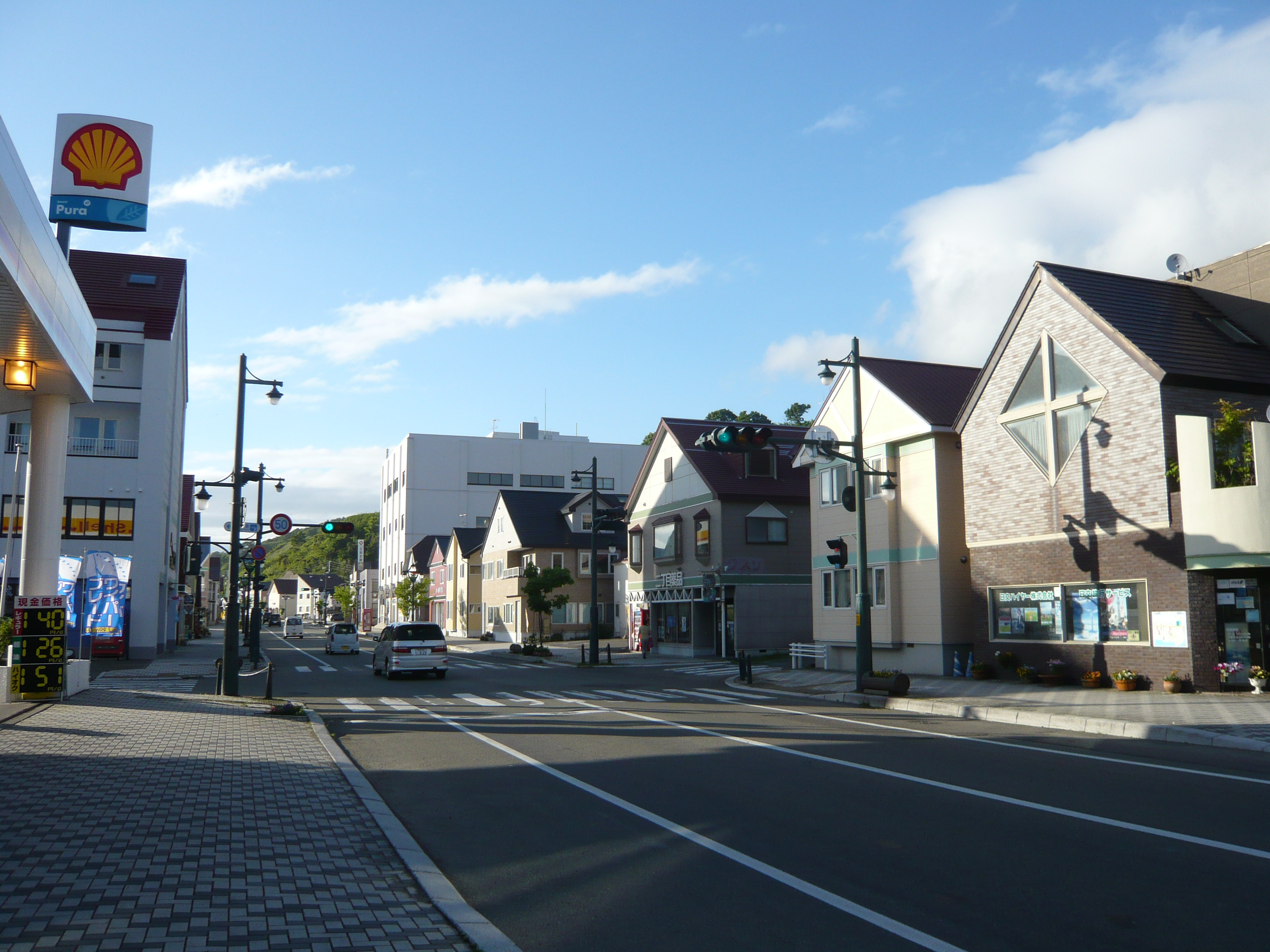
Urakawa

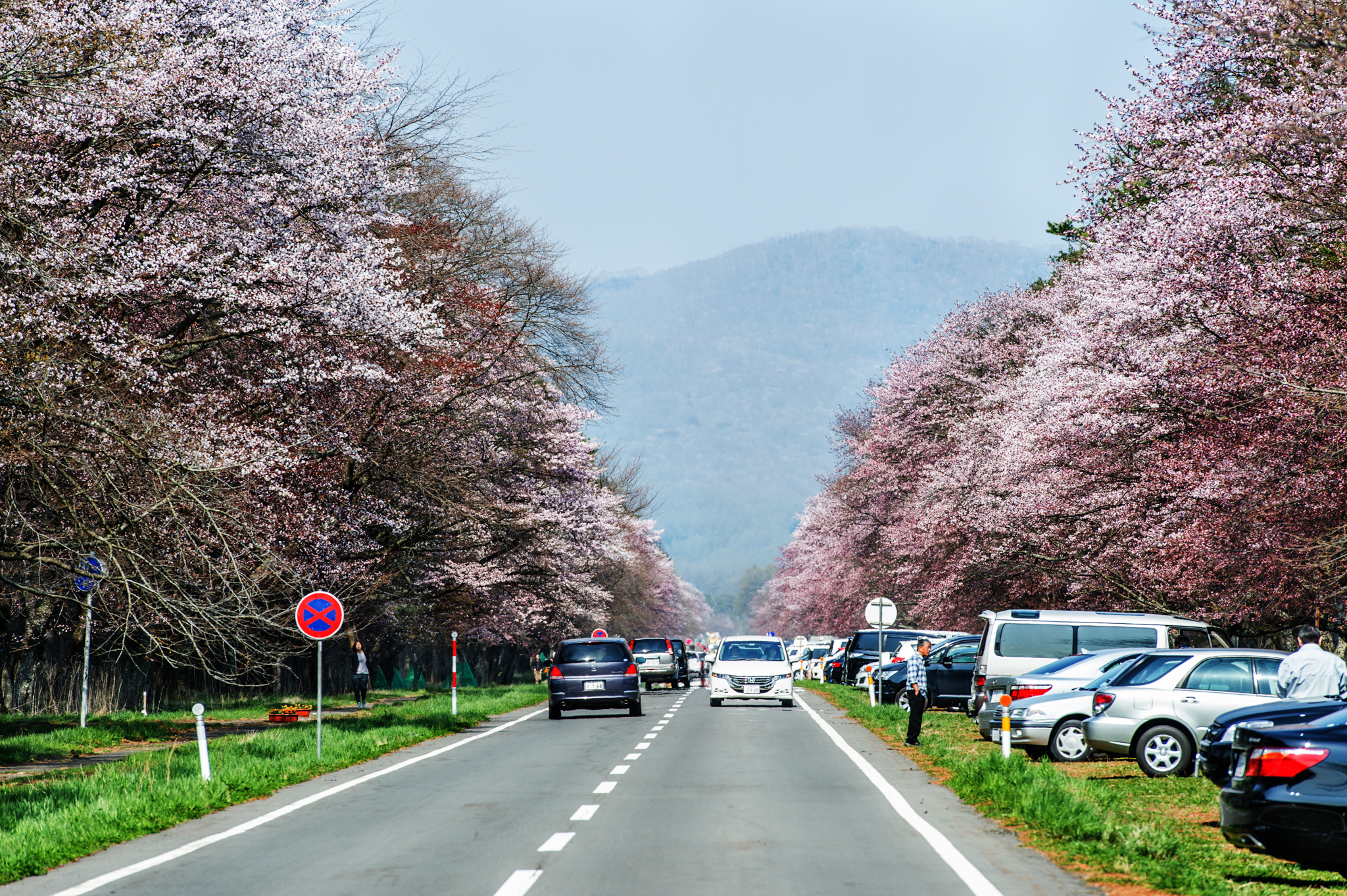
Shinhidaka

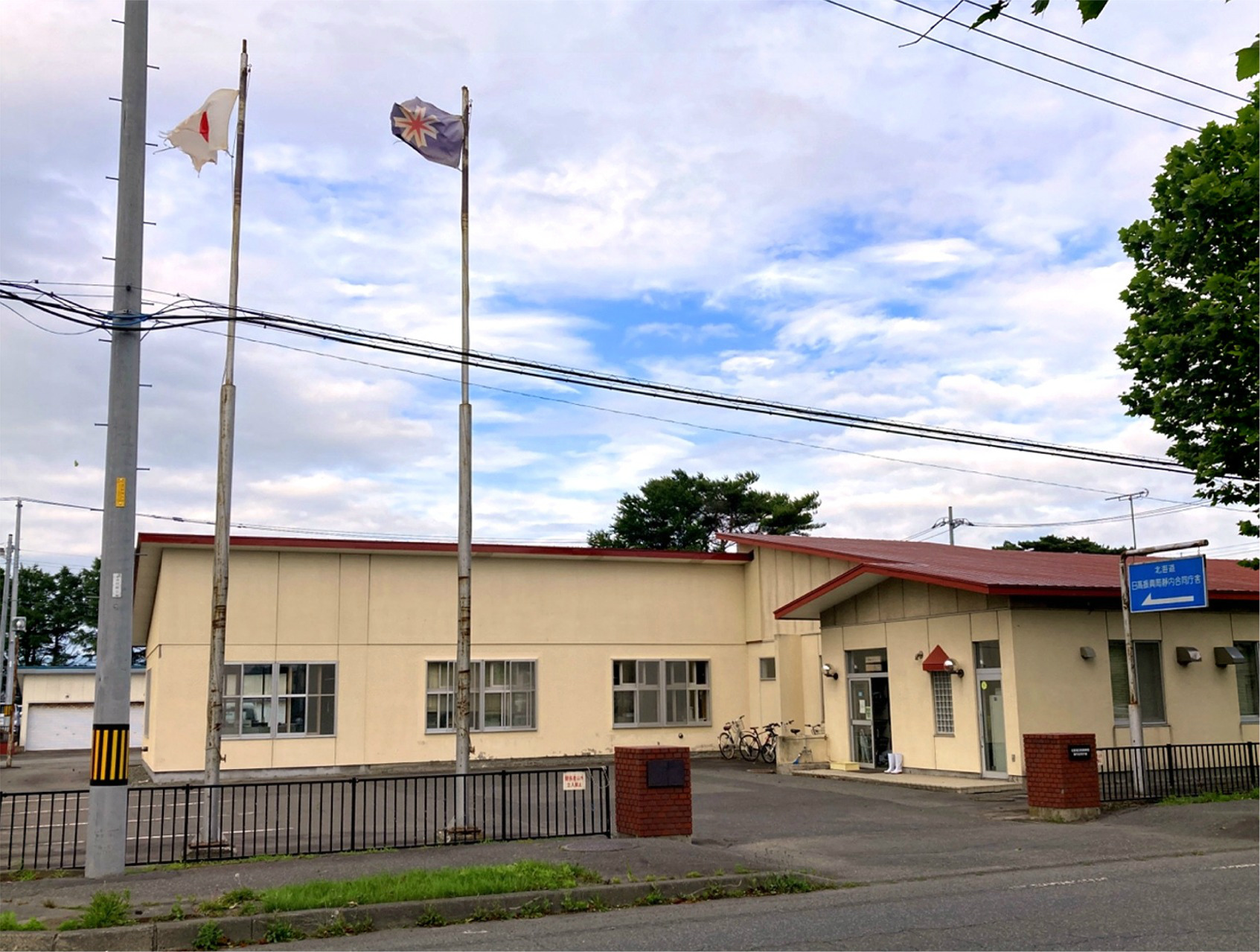
Shizunai office of Hidaka Subprefecture

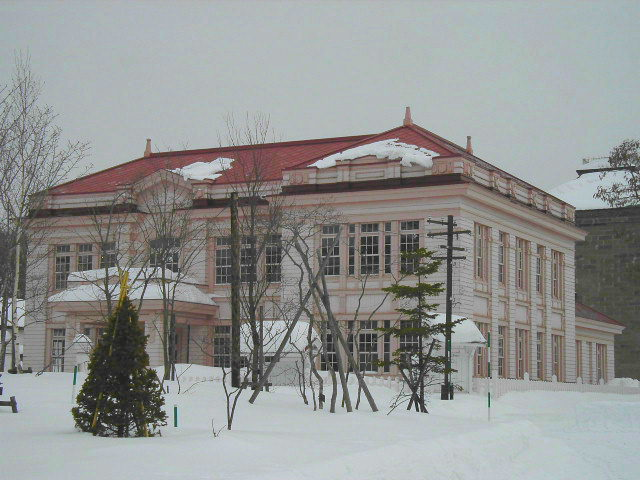
Office building of Urakawa Subprefecture (built in 1919)

Hidaka Subprefecture (日高振興局, Hidaka-shinkō-kyoku) is a subprefecture of Hokkaido Prefecture, Japan. The west side of the Hidaka mountains occupies most of the area. Hidaka is sparsely populated and has many of Hokkaido's natural resources. The governmental office is located in Urakawa.

== History ==
- 1897: Urakawa Subprefecture established.
- 1932: Urakawa Subprefecture renamed Hidaka Subprefecture.

The name Hidaka ("sun high") is derived from the province of the same name established in 1869, which in turn was named after an unknown place in the Nihonshoki, a history book written in 720. There is no direct connection between the Hidaka of the Nihonshoki and the modern Hidaka.

== Geography ==
Located on the south-east coast of Hokkaido, Hidaka Subprefecture has an area of 4,811.91 square kilometres (1,857.89 sq mi) making it the 7th largest subprefecture in the prefecture and 5.8% of Hokkaido's total area. More than 80% of the area is covered with forest.

The prefecture borders Tokachi Subprefecture to the north across the Hidaka Mountains. To the west is Iburi Subprefecture. The south side of the subprefecture is its coast on the Pacific Ocean.

The Hidaka Mountains are known as a "Mecca of Mountaineering", with more than 20 mountains including Mount Poroshiri at 2,052 metres (6,732 ft). These mountains are part of the Hidaka Sanmyaku-Erimo Quasi-National Park, which include Mount Apoi alpine vegetation community and Cape Erimo coast landscape. These areas boast wildlife such as brown bear, sika deer, and common seal.

=== Municipalities ===
Name		Area (km^{2})	Population	Pop. Density	District	Type	Map
Rōmaji	Kanji	Area (km^{2})	Population	Pop. Density	District	Type	Map
Biratori	平取町	743.16	5,305	7.14	Saru District	Town	
Erimo	えりも町	283.93	4,954	17.45	Horoizumi District	Town	
Hidaka	日高町	992.67	12,596	12.69	Saru District	Town	
Niikappu	新冠町	585.88	5,696	9.72	Niikappu District	Town	
Samani	様似町	364.33	4,482	12.30	Samani District	Town	
Shinhidaka	新ひだか町	1,147.75	23,516	20.49	Hidaka District	Town	
Urakawa (capital)	浦河町	694.24	12,800	18.44	Urakawa District	Town	

== Demographics ==
The population of Hidaka Subprefecture is 81,407 in 33,996 households. In the 2005 census, this represents 1.4% of the total population of Hokkaido. The population of Hidaka peaked in 1960. The current population is down 4,613 from the last census in 2005.
