= Minatogawa-kōen Station =

Metro station in Kobe, Japan

Coordinates: 34.6791°N 135.1671°E

Minatogawa-kōen Station 湊川公園駅
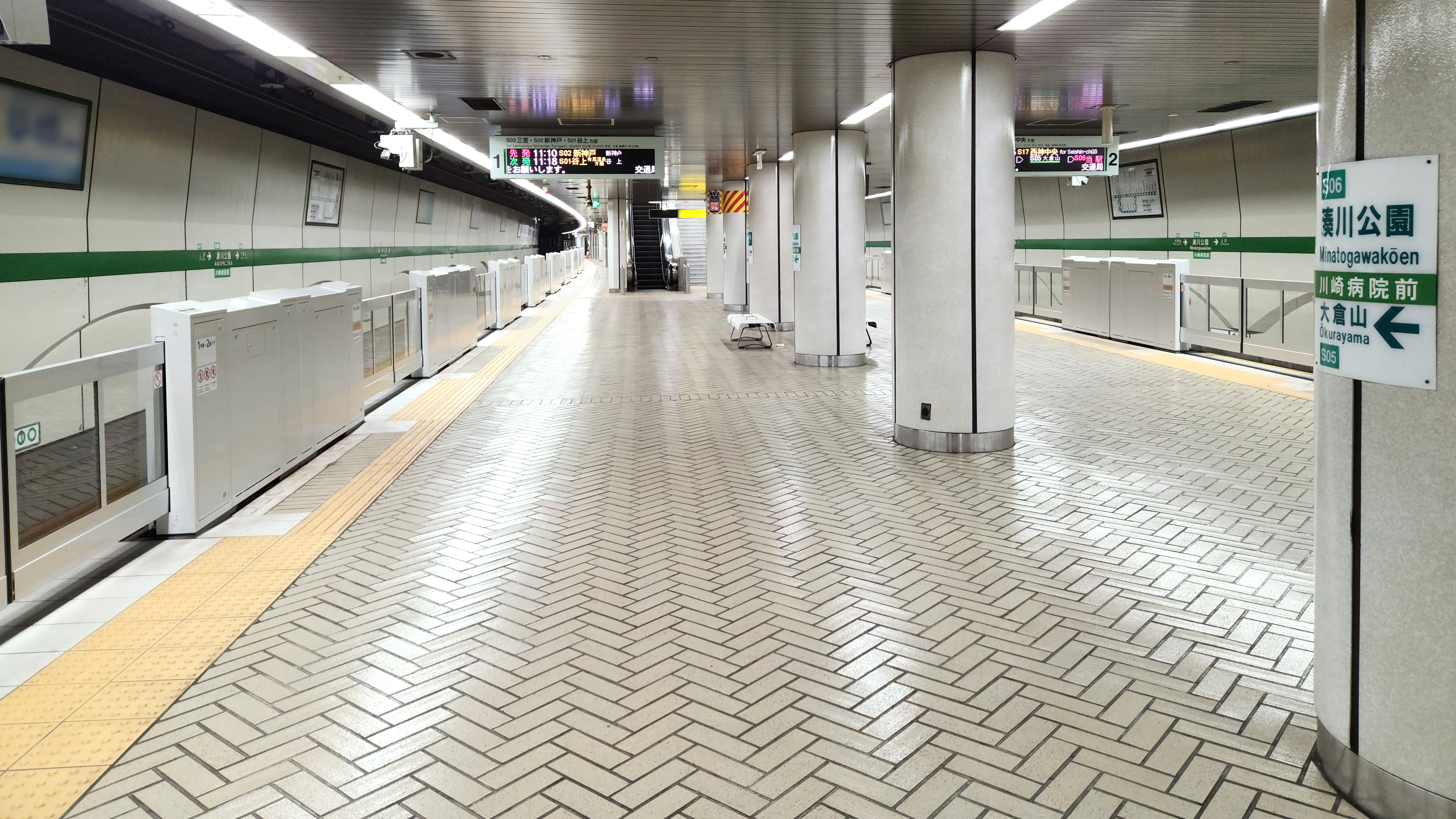
- Station platform

General information
- System: Kobe Municipal Subway station
- Operator: Kobe Municipal Transportation Bureau
- Line: Seishin-Yamate Line

Other information
- Station code: S06

Services
| Preceding station | Kobe Municipal Subway | Following station |
|---|---|---|
| Kamisawa towards Seishin-Chuo | Seishin-Yamate Line | Ōkurayama towards Shin-Kobe |
Location
- Location within Kobe Location within Hyōgo Prefecture Location within Japan

Minatogawa-Kōen Station (湊川公園駅, Minatogawa-Kōen-eki) is a railway station in Hyōgo-ku, Kobe, Hyōgo Prefecture, Japan.

== Lines ==
- Kobe Municipal Subway

- Seishin-Yamate Line (S06)

- Kobe Electric Railway

- Arima Line, Kobe Kosoku Line - Minatogawa Station

- Kobe City Bus: Minatogawa-koen-nishiguchi
- Kobe City Transportation Promotion Co. Yamate Route: Minatogawa-koen-higashiguchi

== Layout ==
- This station has a concourse on the 1st basement, and an island platform serving 2 tracks on the 2nd basement.

| 1 | ■ Seishin-Yamate Line | for Sannomiya, Shin-Kobe and Tanigami |
| 2 | ■ Seishin-Yamate Line | for Myōdani and Seishin-chūō |

== History ==
The station opened on 17 June 1983.

== Surroundings ==
- Minatogawa Park (upper the station)
- Hyogo Ward Office
- Hyogo Police Station
- Hyogo Fire Station
- Palcinema Shinkouen
