= Nagata Station (Kobe Municipal Subway) =

Metro station in Kobe, Japan

Coordinates: 34°40′07″N 135°09′05″E

Nagata (Nagatajinjamae) Station 長田（長田神社前）駅
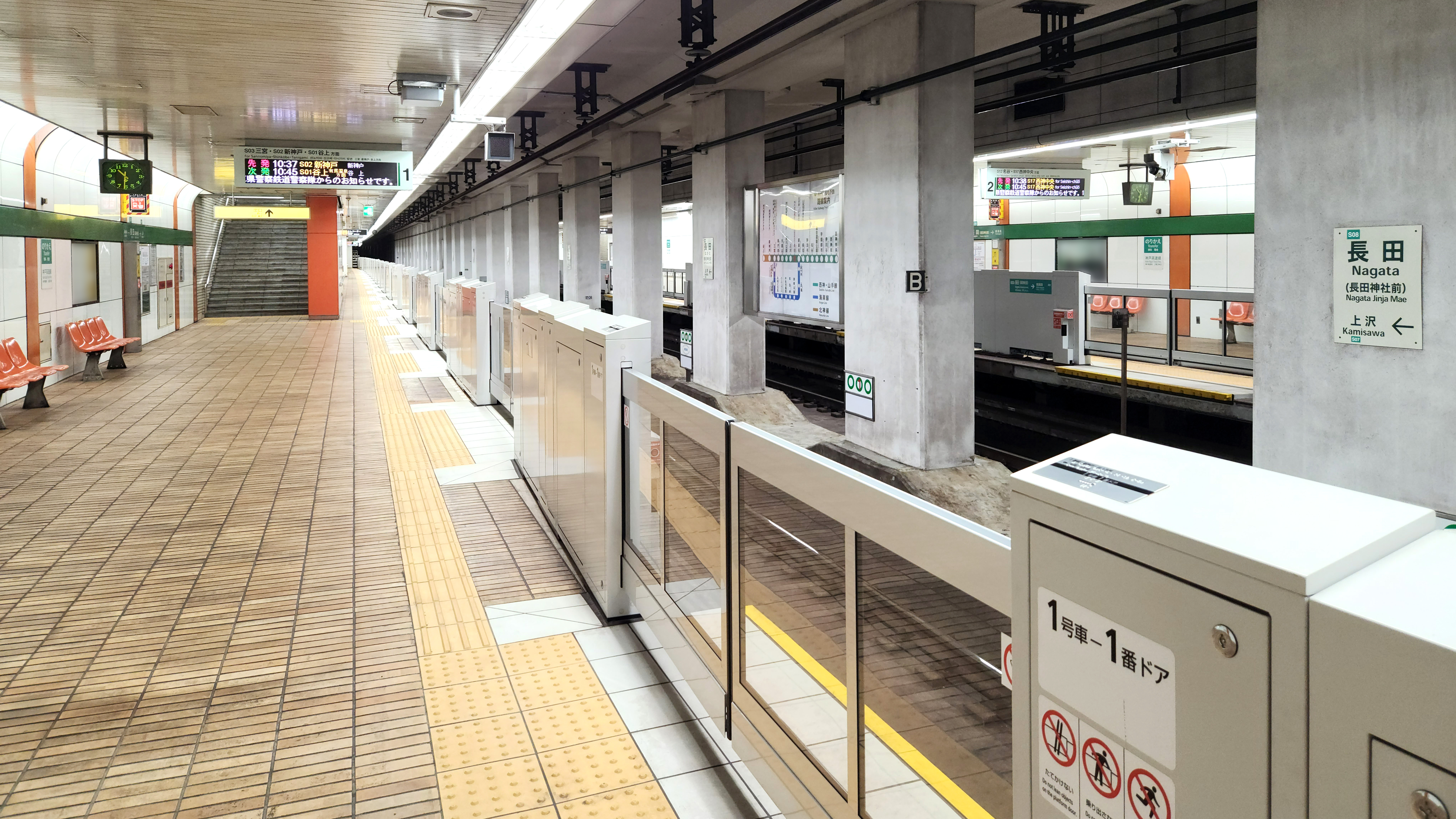
- Station platform

General information
- System: Kobe Municipal Subway station
- Operator: Kobe Municipal Transportation Bureau
- Line: Seishin-Yamate Line

Other information
- Station code: S08

Services
Preceding station	Kobe Municipal Subway	Following station
Shin-Nagata towards Seishin-Chuo	Seishin-Yamate Line	Kamisawa towards Shin-Kobe
Location
- Location within Kobe Location within Hyōgo Prefecture Location within Japan

Nagata (Nagatajinjamae) Station (長田（長田神社前）駅, Nagata (Nagatajinjamae) eki) is a railway station in Nagata-ku, Kobe, Hyōgo Prefecture, Japan. The name is derived from the nearby Nagata Shrine.

== Lines ==
- Kobe Municipal Subway

- Seishin-Yamate Line (S08)

- Hanshin Railway

- Kobe Kosoku Line - Kosoku Nagata Station

== History ==
The station opened on 17 June 1983.
