= Sōgō Undō Kōen Station =

Metro station in Kobe, Japan

Sōgō Undō Kōen Station 総合運動公園駅
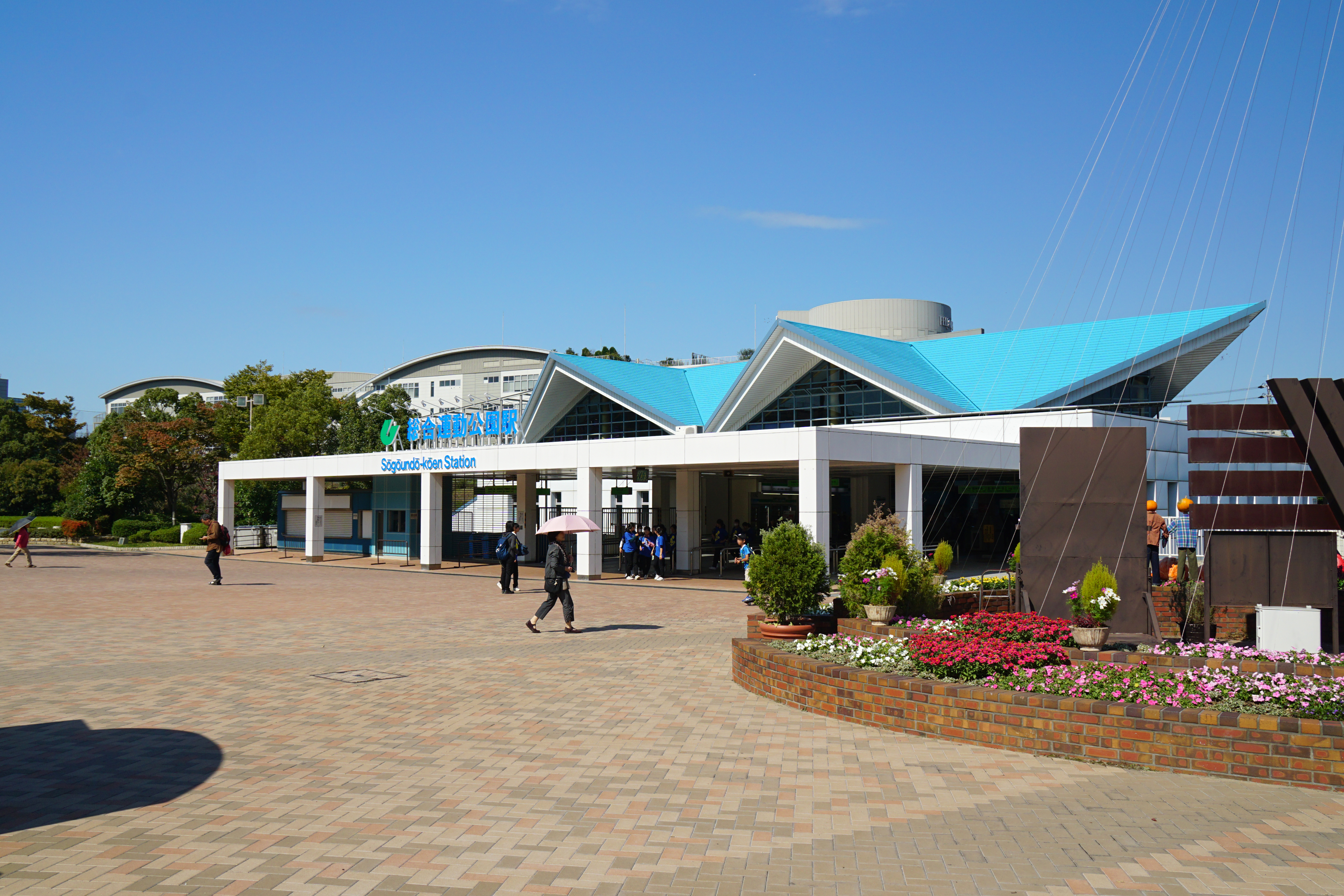

General information
- Location: Midoridai, Suma, Kobe, Hyōgo （神戸市須磨区緑台） Japan
- Coordinates: 34°40′54″N 135°04′33″E
- System: Kobe Municipal Subway station
- Operator: Kobe Municipal Transportation Bureau
- Line: Seishin-Yamate Line
- Platforms: 1 island platform, 2 side platforms
- Tracks: 2

Other information
- Station code: S13

History
- Opened: 1985

Services
Preceding station	Kobe Municipal Subway	Following station
Gakuen-Toshi towards Seishin-Chuo	Seishin-Yamate Line	Myōdani towards Shin-Kobe
Location
- Location within Kobe Location within Hyōgo Prefecture Location within Japan

Sōgō Undō Kōen Station (総合運動公園駅, Sōgō Undō Kōen-eki; S13) is a railway station on the Kobe Municipal Subway Seishin-Yamate Line in Suma-ku, Kobe, Hyōgo Prefecture, Japan.

== Layout ==
There is an island platform with two tracks between two side platforms under the concourse.

1	■ Seishin-Yamate Line	for Sannomiya, Shin-Kobe and Tanigami
2	■ Seishin-Yamate Line	for Gakuen-Toshi and Seishin-Chūō

== History ==
The station opened on 18 June 1985.

== Surroundings ==
The station is located in Kobe Sports Park.

- Baseball stadium (Hotto Motto Field Kobe) - approx 3 minutes on foot
- Kobe Universiade Memorial Stadium - approx 7 minutes on foot
- Kobe Green Arena - approx 7 minutes on foot
- Tennis court - approx 10 minutes on foot
