= Ikawadani Station =

Metro station in Kobe, Japan

Coordinates: 34.6878°N 135.0412°E

Ikawadani 伊川谷
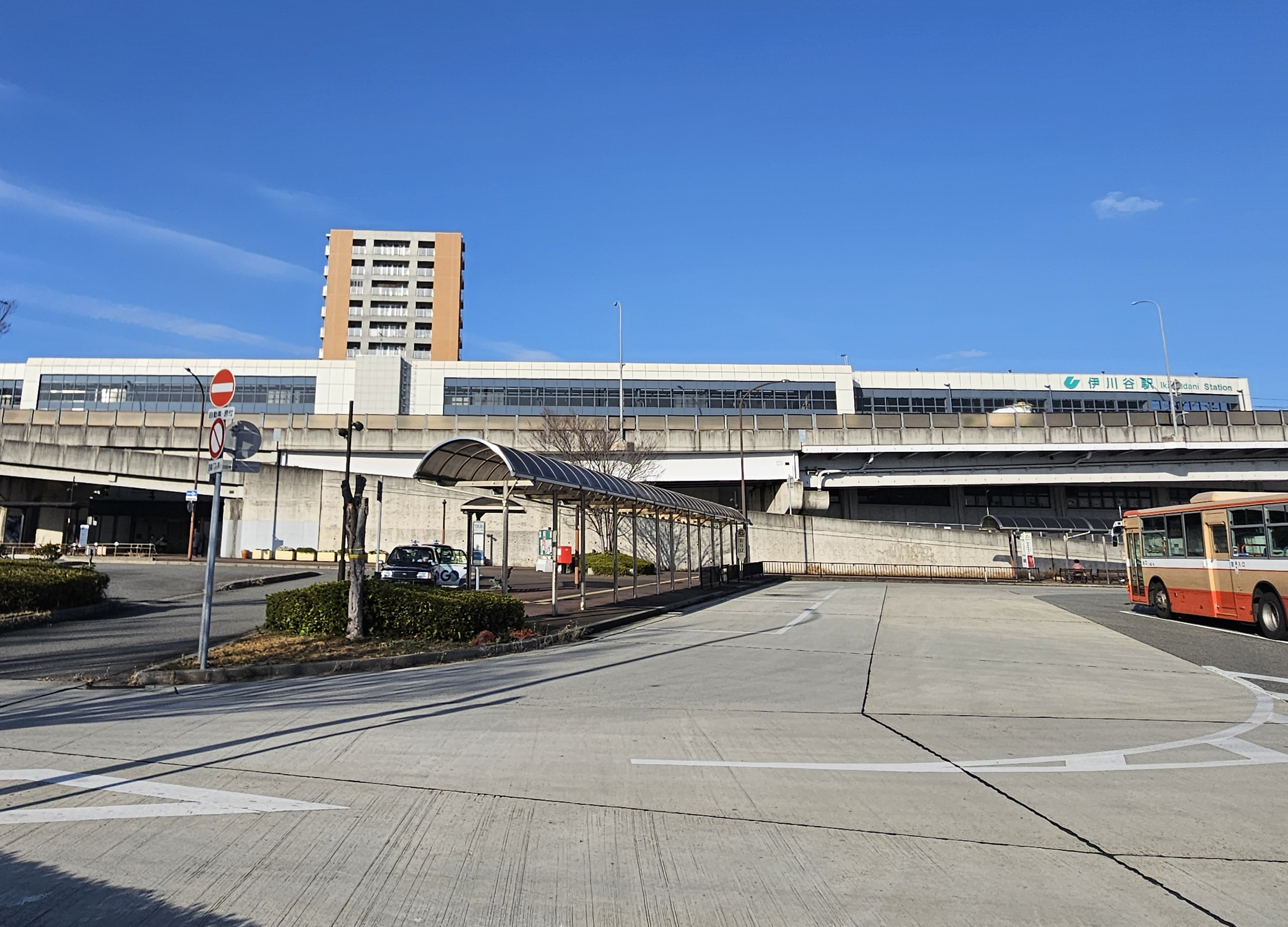
- Station building (March 2026)

General information
- System: Kobe Municipal Subway station
- Operator: Kobe Municipal Transportation Bureau
- Line: Seishin-Yamate Line
- Platforms: 2 side platforms
- Tracks: 2

Construction
- Structure type: Elevated

Other information
- Station code: S15

History
- Opened: 18 March 1987; 39 years ago

Services
Preceding station	Kobe Municipal Subway	Following station
Seishin-Minami towards Seishin-Chuo	Seishin-Yamate Line	Gakuen-Toshi towards Shin-Kobe
Location
- Location within Kobe Location within Hyōgo Prefecture Location within Japan

Ikawadani Station (伊川谷駅, Ikawadani-eki) is a metro station in Nishi-ku, Kobe, Hyōgo Prefecture, Japan.

== Lines ==
- Kobe Municipal Subway

- Seishin-Yamate Line Station S15

== Layout ==
There are two side platforms serving a track each on the second floor of the station.

== History ==
The station opened on 18 March 1987.
