= Myōhōji Station (Hyōgo) =

Metro station in Kobe, Japan

Coordinates: 34°40′30″N 135°06′36″E

Myōhōji Station 妙法寺駅
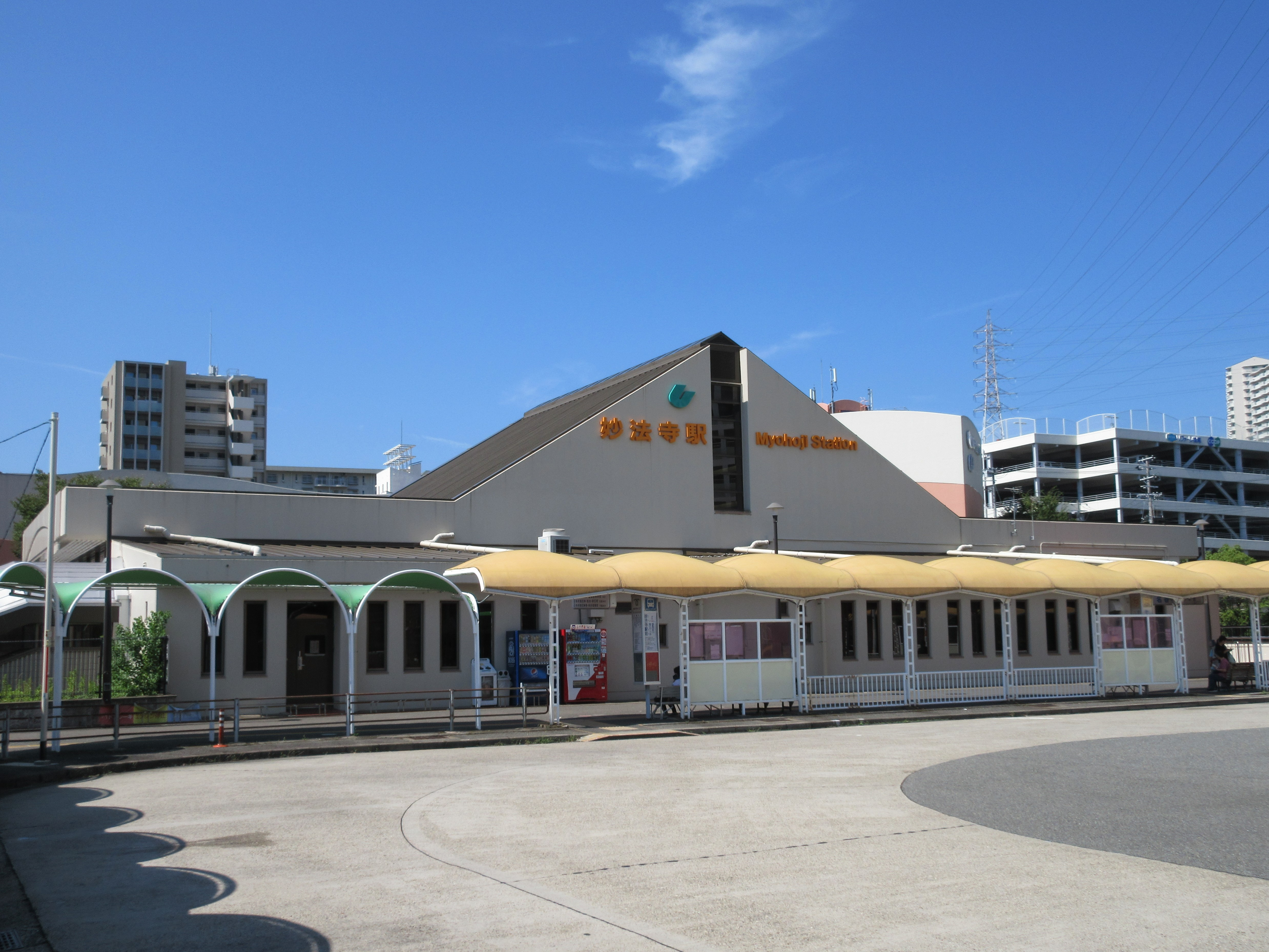
- Station building

General information
- System: Kobe Municipal Subway station
- Operator: Kobe Municipal Transportation Bureau
- Line: Seishin-Yamate Line

Other information
- Station code: S11

Services
Preceding station	Kobe Municipal Subway	Following station
Myōdani towards Seishin-Chuo	Seishin-Yamate Line	Itayado towards Shin-Kobe
Location
- Location within Kobe Location within Hyōgo Prefecture Location within Japan

Myōhōji Station (妙法寺駅, Myōhōji-eki) is a railway station in Suma-ku, Kobe, Hyōgo Prefecture, Japan.

As there are no other railways lines serving northern Suma, a large number of passengers use this station, especially during the morning rush hour.

== Lines ==
- Kobe Municipal Subway

- Seishin-Yamate Line Station S11

== History ==
The station opened on 13 March 1977.
