= Kobe Municipal Subway 6000 series =

Japanese electric multiple unit train type

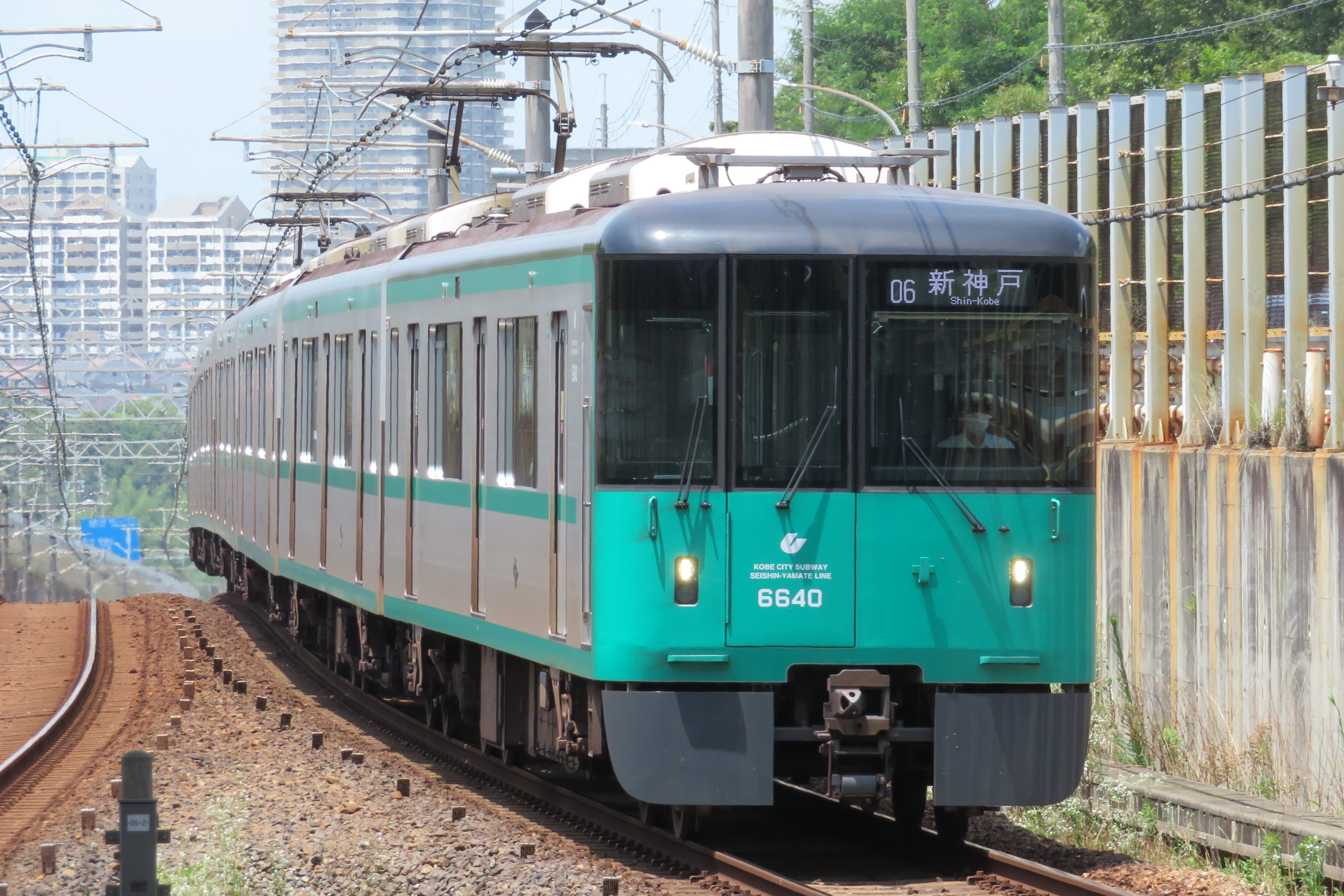
- A 6000 series train at Seishin-minami Station in July 2021

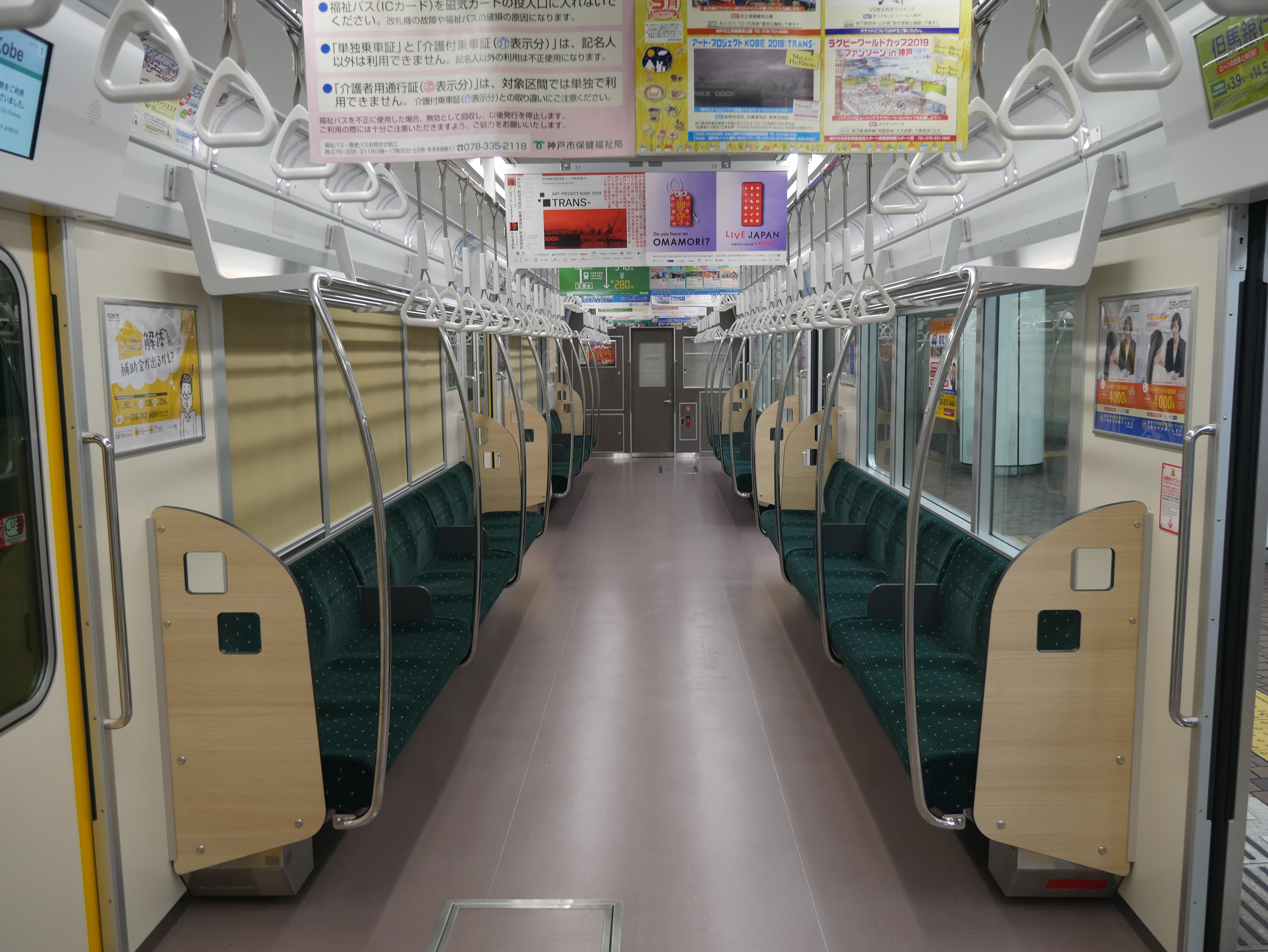
- Stock type: EMU
- In service: 2019–present
- Manufacturer: Kawasaki
- Designer: Ken Okuyama
- Built at: Hyogo Ward
- Replaced: 1000 series; 2000 series; 3000 series; Hokushin Kyuko 7000 series
- Constructed: 2017–2023
- Entered service: February 16, 2019
- Number built: 174 carriages (29 sets)
- Formation: 6-car sets
- Capacity: 272 seated, 536 standing
- Operator: Kobe Municipal Subway
- Lines served: Seishin-Yamate Line; Hokushin Line

Specifications
- Car body construction: Aluminium alloy, double-skin
- Car length: 19 m (62 ft 4 in)
- Width: 2.79 m (9 ft 2 in)
- Height: 4.09 m (13 ft 5 in)
- Doors: 3 per side
- Maximum speed: 100 km/h (62 mph)
- Traction system: Hitachi VFI-HR1421H hybrid SiC-IGBT–VVVF
- Traction motors: 12 × 170 kW (230 hp)
- Acceleration: 3.3 km/(h⋅s) (2.1 mph/s)
- Deceleration: 3.5 km/(h⋅s) (2.2 mph/s) (service); 4.5 km/(h⋅s) (2.8 mph/s) (emergency)
- Electric systems: 1,500 V DC (nominal) from overhead catenary
- Current collection: Pantograph
- UIC classification: 2′2′+Bo′Bo′+Bo′Bo′+2′2′+Bo′Bo′+2′2′
- Track gauge: 1,435 mm (4 ft 8 1/2 in) standard gauge

The Kobe Municipal Subway 6000 series (神戸市交通局6000形, Kōbe Shi Kōtsū-kyōku 6000-gata) is an electric multiple unit (EMU) train type operated by the Kobe Municipal Subway on the Seishin-Yamate Line and Hokushin Line (the two lines operate a through service) since February 16, 2019.

== Design and manufacturing ==
The trains were manufactured by Kawasaki. They were initially designed by Ken Okuyama Design in 2016.

28 six-car trainsets were ordered to replace the entire fleet of 28 1000/2000/3000 series trains on the Seishin-Yamate Line by 2022, providing a single common fleet of trains for the line allowing for the installation of automatic platform gates at every station.

Following the transfer of the Hokushin Line to Kobe Municipality on June 1, 2020, one extra trainset was ordered to allow for replacement of the remaining Hokushin Kyuko Railway 7000 series[ja] trains, bringing the number of 6000 series trainsets to 29 which would allow all services on both the Seishin-Yamate and Hokushin Lines to be provided by the new 6000 series trains.

== Interior ==
Passenger accommodation consists of longitudinal bench seating throughout, with priority seats being provided at the ends of each car. LED lighting is used in the interiors, and pairs of LCD passenger information screens are provided above the doorways. Although there are gangway connections between each car, they are blocked by openable glass doors.

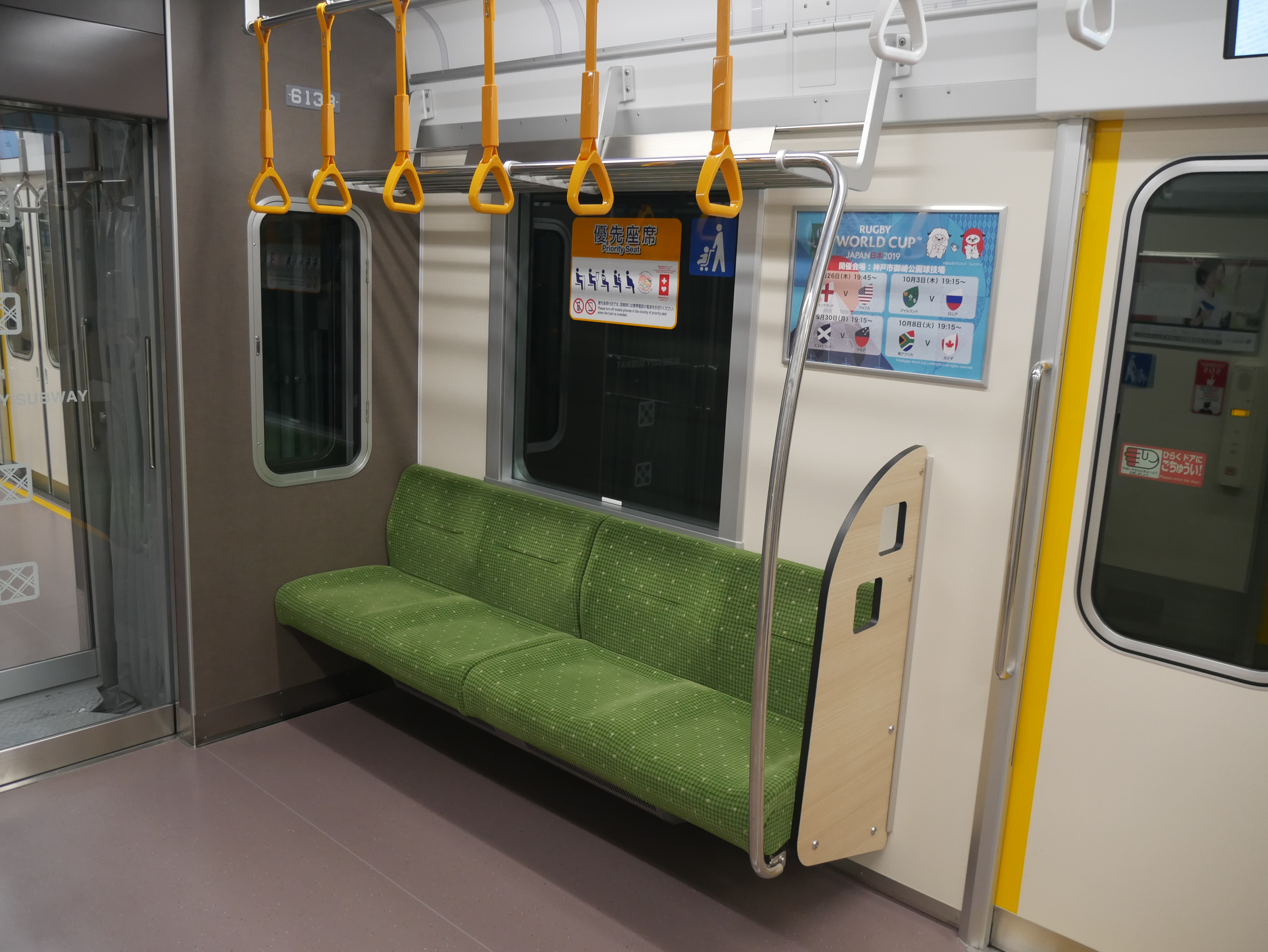
Priority seating

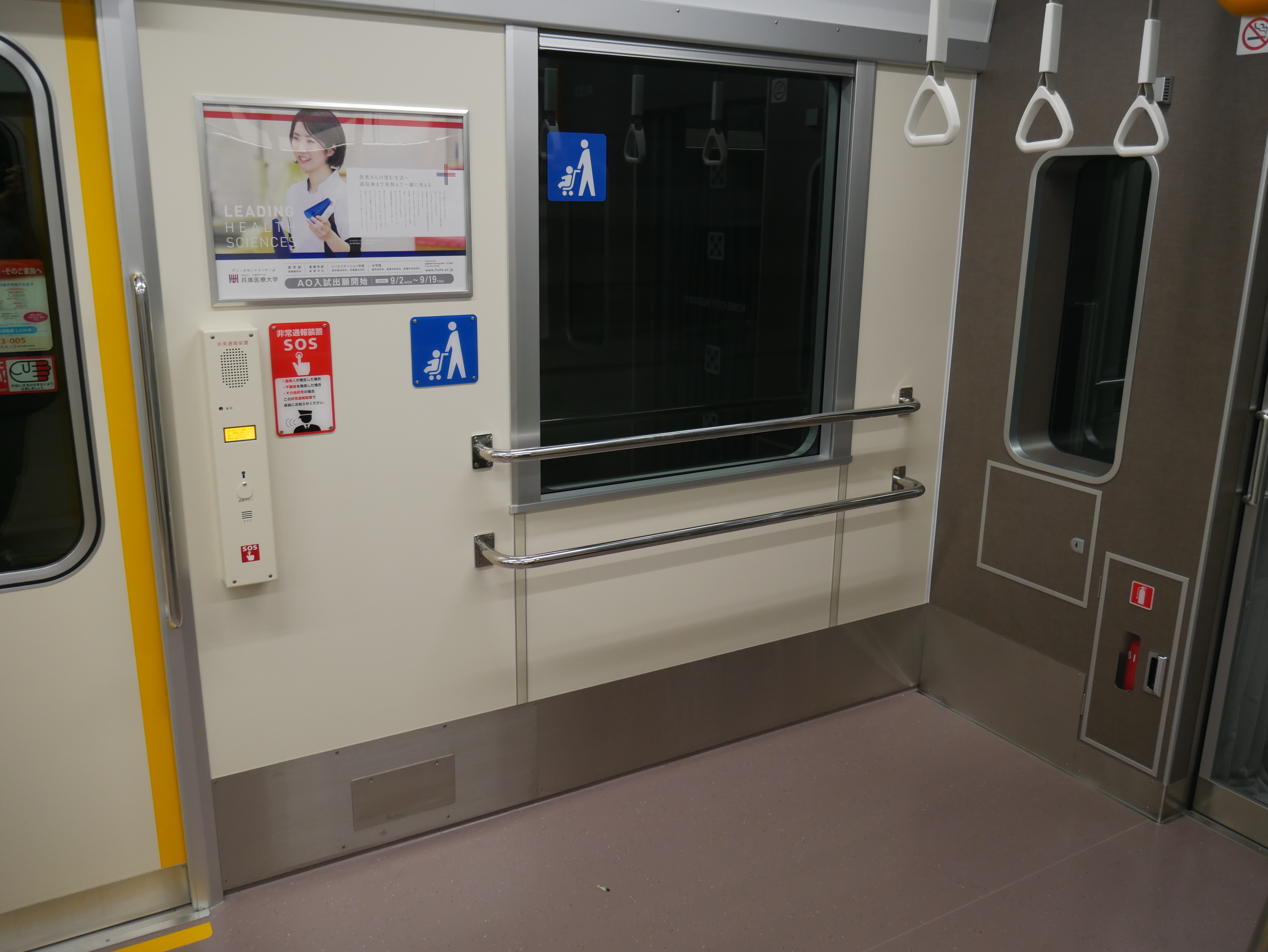
Wheelchair space

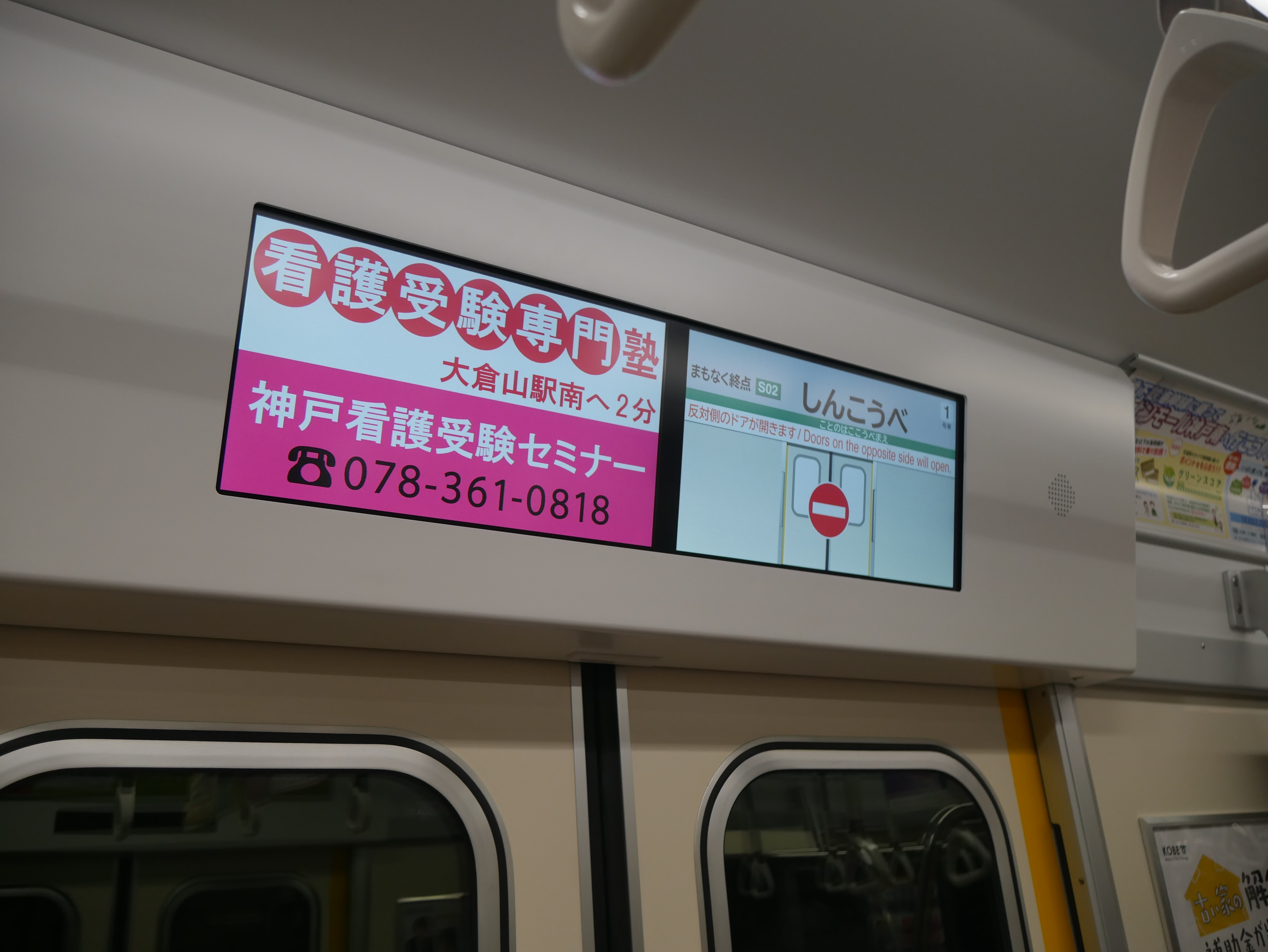
LCD passenger information display

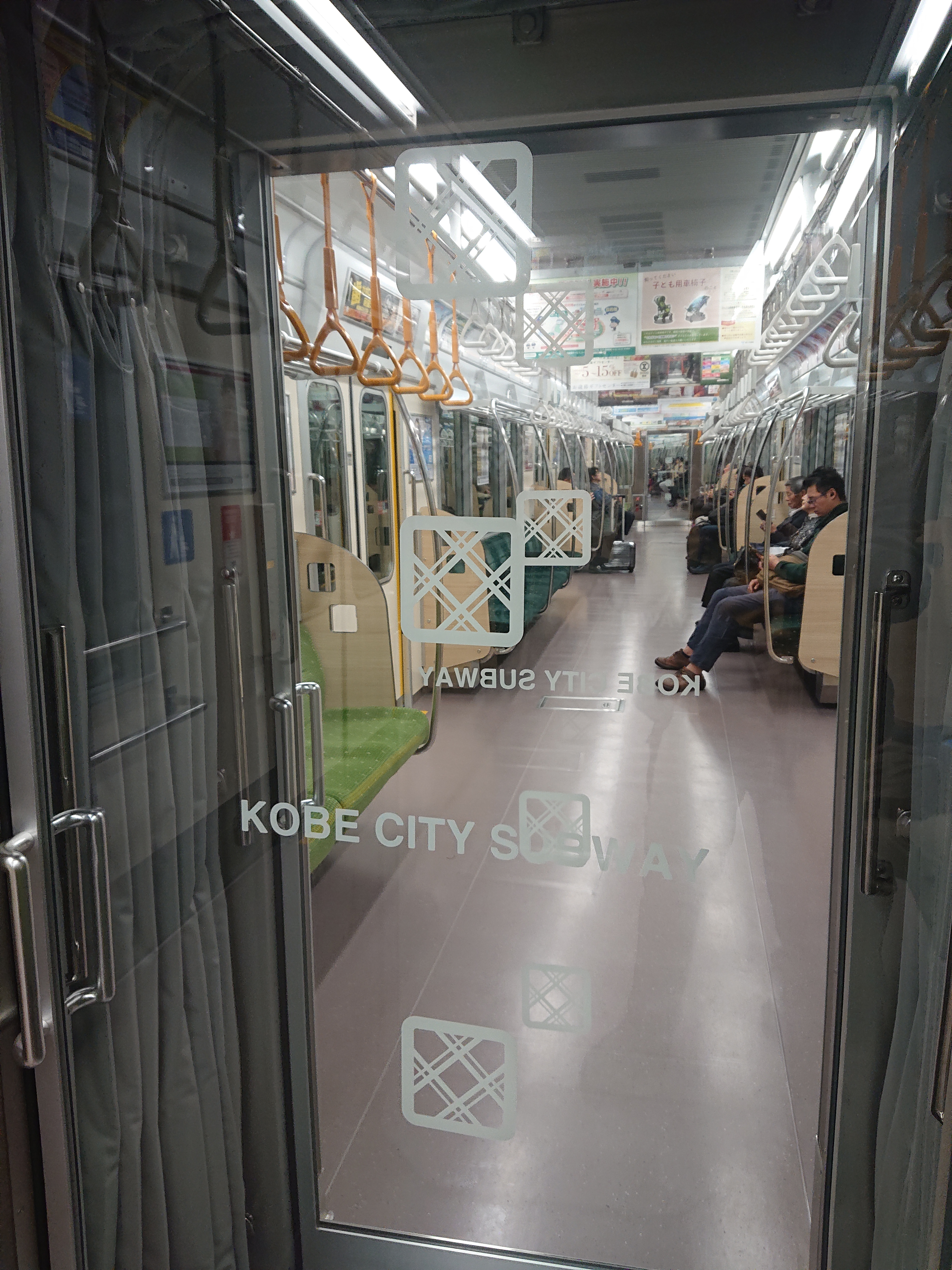
Gangway connection

== History ==
The 6000 series trains replaced the following previously operated train types (all six-car trainsets). The initial order of 28 trainsets was to replace the 28 1000/2000/3000 series trains, with one additional trainset ordered to replace the remaining Hokushin Kyuko Railway 7000 series trains:

- 1000 series[ja] (1977–2023) (18 sets). Withdrawn on August 17, 2023
- 2000 series[ja] (1988–2022) (4 sets). Withdrawn on March 19, 2022
- 3000 series[ja] (1992–2021) (6 sets). Withdrawn on July 24, 2021
- Hokushin Kyuko Railway 7000 series[ja] (1988–2023). Initially 5 sets, 2 of which were withdrawn in 2022. The remaining 3 sets withdrawn on August 17, 2023.

The first 6000 series trainsets entered service on February 16, 2019.

As of August 2022, 25 trainsets have been constructed.

The initial order of 28 trainsets was completed on March 8, 2023, with the 29th trainset completed on November 1, 2023.

On July 18, 2023, it was announced that a timetable change would be implemented on August 18, 2023, and that all services on the Seishin-Yamate and Hokushin Lines from this date will be operated by the new 6000 series trains.
