= Gakuen-Toshi Station =

Metro station in Kobe, Japan

Coordinates: 34.6812°N 135.0578°E

Gakuen-Toshi Station 学園都市駅
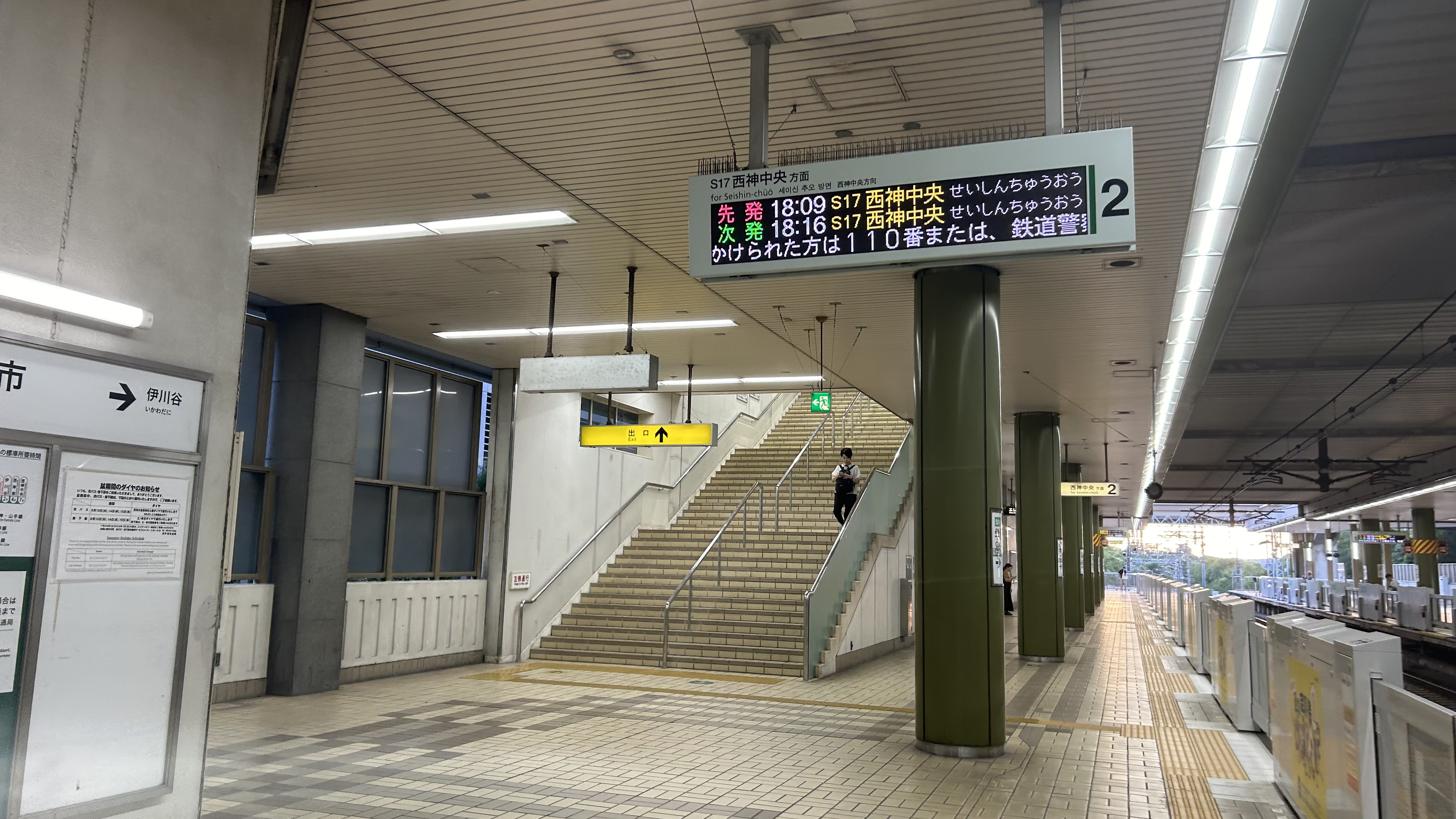
- Gakuen-Toshi Station platforms

General information
- System: Kobe Municipal Subway station
- Operator: Kobe Municipal Transportation Bureau
- Line: Seishin-Yamate Line

Other information
- Station code: S14

Services
Preceding station	Kobe Municipal Subway	Following station
Ikawadani towards Seishin-Chuo	Seishin-Yamate Line	Sōgō Undō Kōen towards Shin-Kobe
Location
- Location within Kobe Location within Hyōgo Prefecture Location within Japan

Gakuen-Toshi Station (学園都市駅, Gakuen-toshi-eki) is a station of the Seishin-Yamate Line of Kobe Municipal Subway in Kobe, Hyōgo, Japan. There are many education institutions and famous Japanese universities in the area. The institutions include Nissan Business School and Kobe Design University.

== History ==
The station opened on 18 June 1985.
