= Kamisawa Station (Hyōgo) =

Metro station in Kobe, Japan

Coordinates: 34.6734°N 135.1584°E

Kamisawa Station 上沢駅
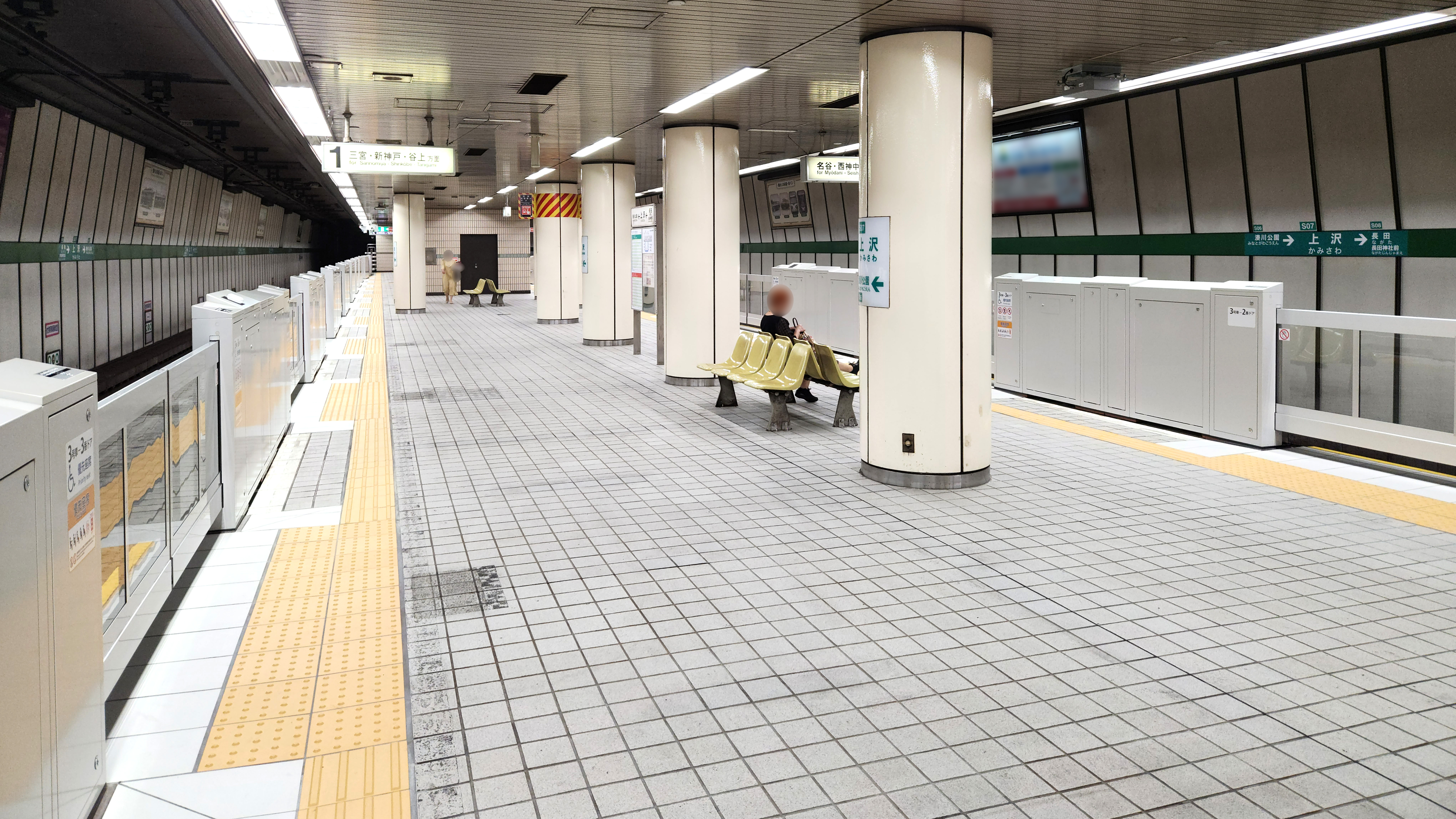
- Station platform

General information
- System: Kobe Municipal Subway station
- Operator: Kobe Municipal Transportation Bureau
- Line: Seishin-Yamate Line
- Tracks: 2

Construction
- Accessible: Yes

Other information
- Station code: S07

History
- Opened: 17 June 1983

Services
Preceding station	Kobe Municipal Subway	Following station
Nagata towards Seishin-Chuo	Seishin-Yamate Line	Minatogawa-Kōen towards Shin-Kobe
Location
- Location within Kobe Location within Hyōgo Prefecture Location within Japan

Kamisawa Station (上沢駅, Kamisawa-eki) is a railway station in Hyōgo-ku, Kobe, Hyōgo Prefecture, Japan.

== Lines ==
- Kobe Municipal Subway

- Seishin-Yamate Line Station S07

== History ==
The station was opened on 17 June 1983.
