= Seishin-minami Station =

Metro station in Kobe, Japan

Coordinates: 34.6993°N 135.0302°E

Seishin-minami 西神南
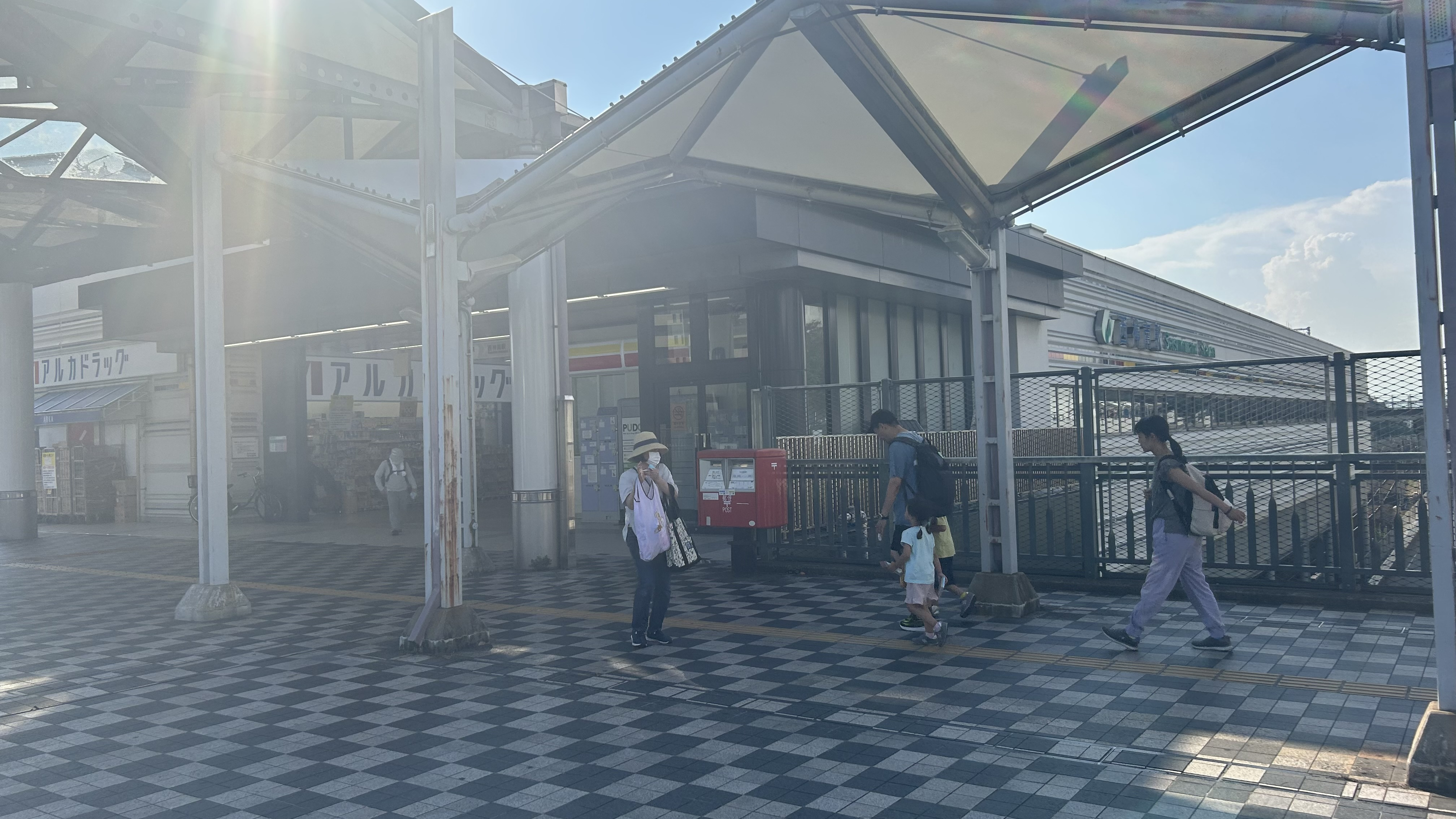
- Station entrance

General information
- System: Kobe Municipal Subway station
- Operator: Kobe Municipal Transportation Bureau
- Line: Seishin-Yamate Line
- Platforms: 1 island platform
- Tracks: 2

Construction
- Structure type: Elevated

Other information
- Station code: S16

History
- Opened: 20 March 1993; 33 years ago

Services
Preceding station	Kobe Municipal Subway	Following station
Seishin-Chuo Terminus	Seishin-Yamate Line	Ikawadani towards Shin-Kobe
Location
- Location within Kobe Location within Hyōgo Prefecture Location within Japan

Seishin-Minami Station (西神南駅) is a railway station on the Seishin-Yamate Line in Nishi-ku, Kobe, Japan. It is located in a residential area near the Kobe Industrial Park.

== Layout ==
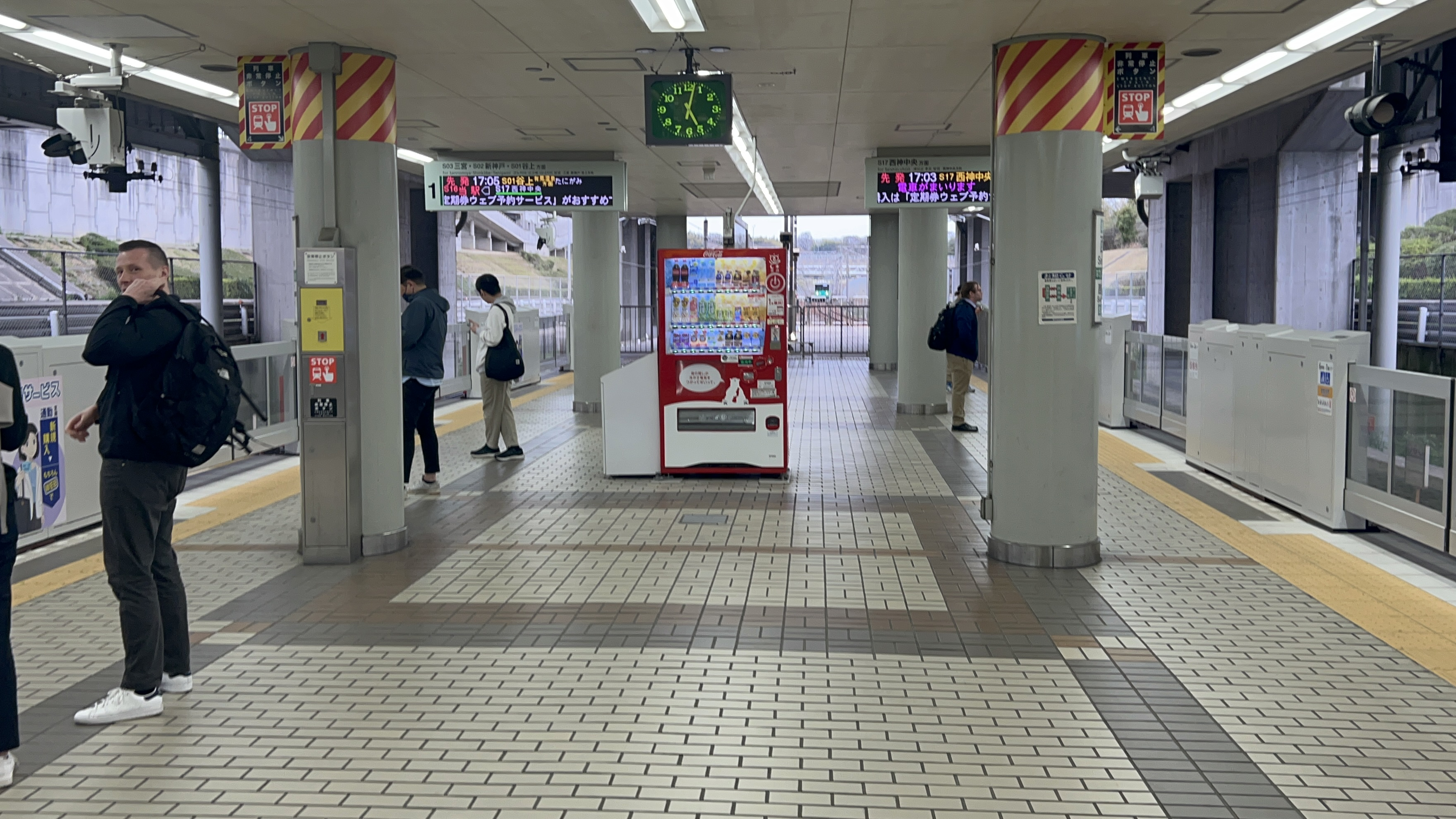
Station platform (2024)

This station has one island platform with two tracks.

1	■ Seishin-Yamate Line	for Shin-Kobe and Tanigami
2	■ Seishin-Yamate Line	for Seishin-chūō

== History ==
The station was opened on 20 March 1993, as an infill station along the Seishin-Yamate Line between Seishin-chūō and Ikawadani stations.
