= Myōdani Station =

Railway station in Hyōgo Prefecture, Japan

Coordinates: 34.6793113°N 135.0942421°E

Myōdani Station 名谷駅
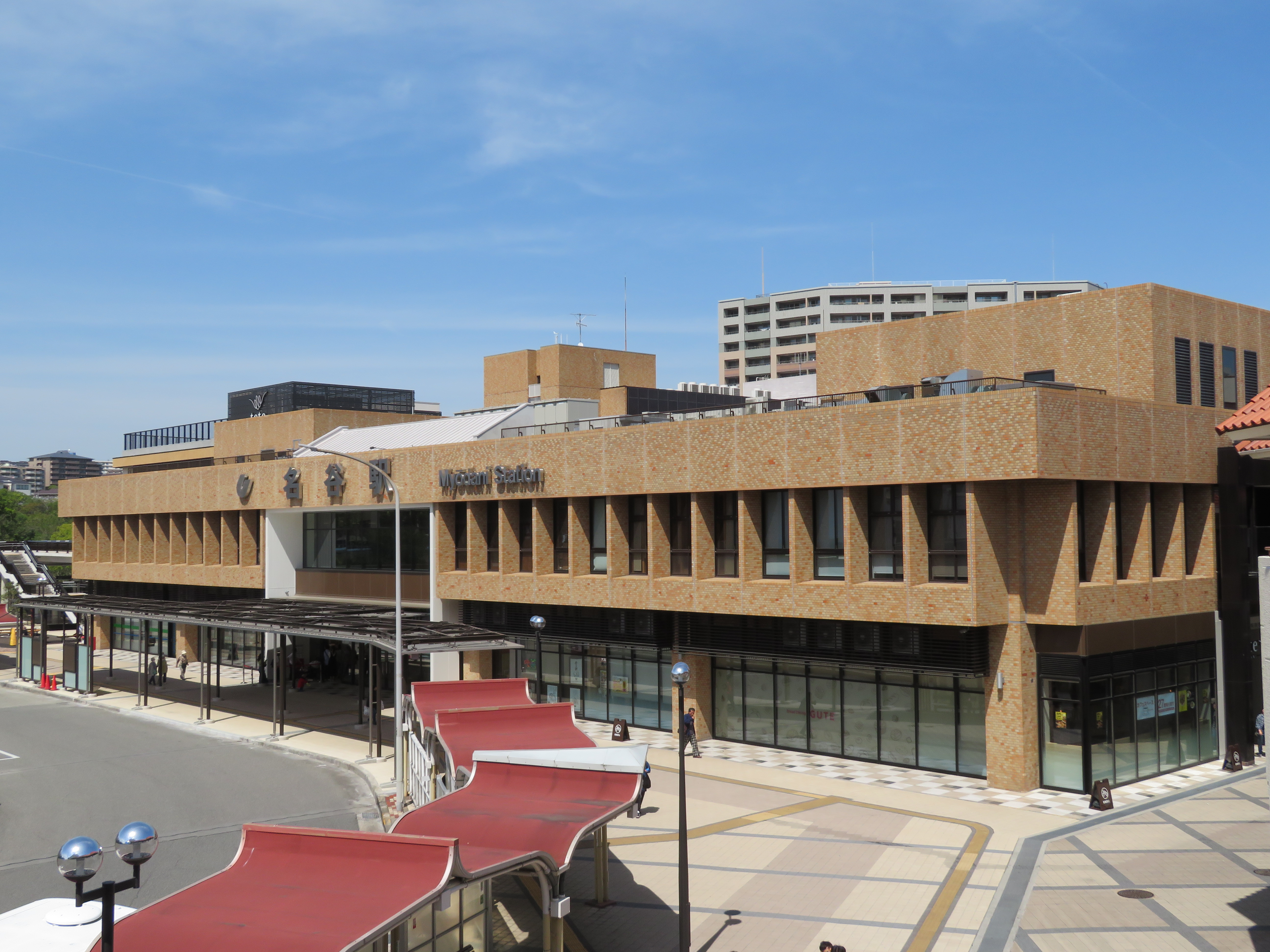
- Station building

General information
- System: Kobe Municipal Subway station
- Operator: Kobe Municipal Transportation Bureau
- Line: Seishin-Yamate Line
- Platforms: 2 island platforms
- Tracks: 4

Other information
- Station code: S12

History
- Opened: 13 March 1977; 49 years ago

Services
Preceding station	Kobe Municipal Subway	Following station
Sōgō Undō Kōen towards Seishin-Chuo	Seishin-Yamate Line	Myōhōji towards Shin-Kobe
Location
- Location within Kobe Location within Hyōgo Prefecture Location within Japan

Myōdani Station (名谷駅, Myōdani-eki) is a railway station in Suma-ku, Kobe, Hyōgo Prefecture, Japan.

Around 20,000 passenger ride the subway from this station, the second most on the Seishin-Yamate Line after Sannomiya Station. Myodani station is the most used station in Suma-ku.

== Lines ==
- Kobe Municipal Subway

- Seishin-Yamate Line Station S12

== Layout ==
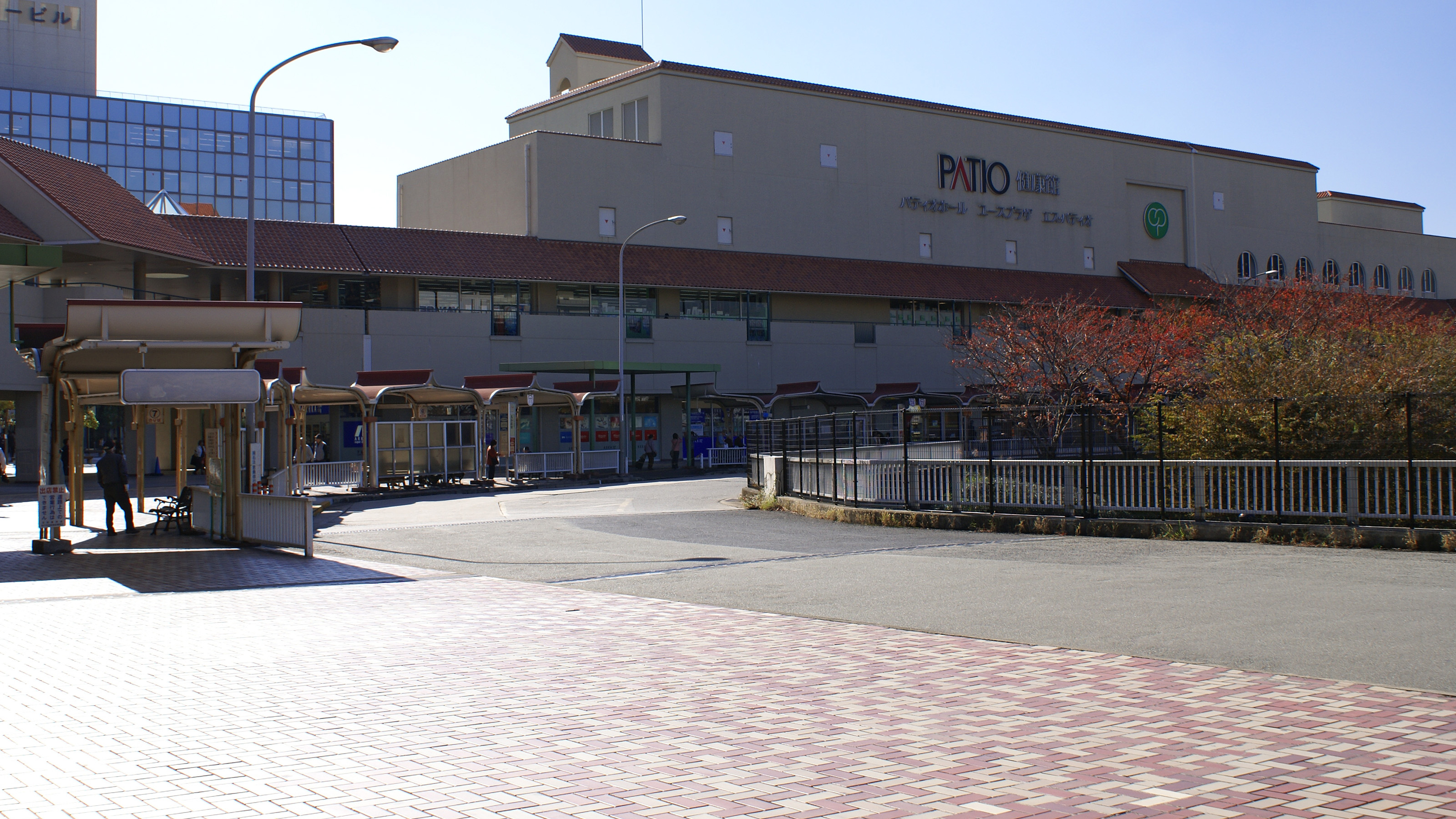
Station entrance

1, 2	■ Seishin-Yamate Line	for Shin-Nagata, Shin-Kobe and Tanigami
3, 4	■ Seishin-Yamate Line	for Seishin-Chuo

== History ==
The station opened on 13 March 1977.
