= Kamisawa Station =

Kamisawa Station may refer to:

- Kamisawa Station (Nagoya), an underground metro station located in Midori-ku, Nagoya, Aichi, Japan
- Kamisawa Station (Hyōgo), a railway station in Hyōgo-ku, Kobe, Hyōgo Prefecture, Japan
