= Seishin-Yamate Line =

Subway line in Kobe, Japan

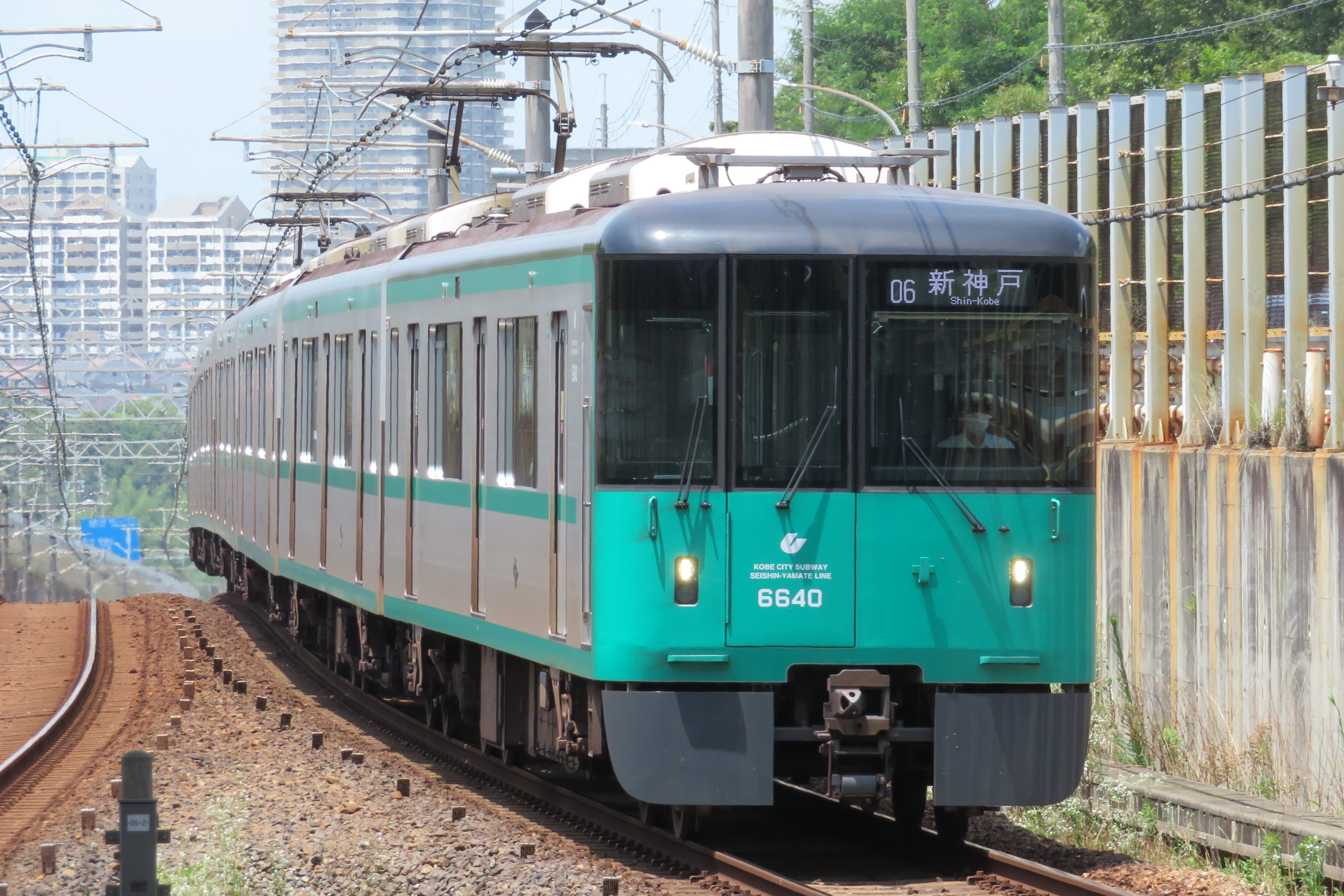
- 6000 series train

Overview
- Other name: Midori no U-Line
- Native name: 西神山手線
- Status: Operational
- Owner: Kobe Municipal Transportation Bureau
- Locale: Kobe
- Termini: Shin-Kobe; Seishin-Chuo
- Stations: 16
- Color on map: Green (#00AE8F)

Service
- Type: Rapid transit
- System: Kobe Municipal Subway
- Operator(s): Kobe Municipal Transportation Bureau

History
- Opened: 13 March 1977; 49 years ago
- Last extension: 1987

Technical
- Line length: 22.7 km (14.1 mi)
- Number of tracks: 2
- Track gauge: 1,435 mm (4 ft 8 1/2 in) standard gauge
- Electrification: 1,500 V DC overhead catenary
- Operating speed: 90 km/h (55 mph)
Route map
Kobe subway lines

The Seishin-Yamate Line (西神山手線, Seishin-Yamate-sen), also known by its nickname of "Midori no U-Line" (Japanese: みどりのUライン, lit. 'The green "U" line'), is one of the three lines of the Kobe Municipal Subway. It links the central districts to the east and western suburbs of Kobe. The line color is green.

== Service pattern ==
The line has a reciprocal through service with the Hokushin Line (formerly the Hokushin Kyukuo Electric Railway); all trains run between either Tanigami or Shin-Kobe and Seishin-chūō, stopping at every station. During rush hours, additional trains run between Shin-Kobe and Myōdani.

== History ==
On 15 October 1971, a railway license was issued to the Kobe Municipal Transportation Bureau to build a subway line linking the Myōdani district to the Shin-Kobe Shinkansen station; construction on the first segment of that line began on 25 November of that year. The first segment of the subway (between Shin-Nagata and Myodani, known as the Seishin Line) opened on 13 March 1977; a second segment of the line (between Shin-Nagata and Okurayama, known as the Yamate Line) opened on 17 February 1982. The line was extended to Shin-Kobe on 18 June 1985; a western extension to Gakuen-toshi (from Myodani) opened that same day. On 18 March 1987, the final segment of the subway line opened between Gakuen-toshi and Seishin-chūō.

The Hokushin Kyuko Electric Railway opened on 2 April 1988, providing service between Tanigami and Shin-Kobe. An infill station (Seishin-minami) opened in between Seishin-chūō and Ikawadani stations on 20 March 1993, expanding the line to a total of 16 stations. On 17 January 1995, the subway line was shut down due to damage caused by the Great Hanshin earthquake; the line resumed operation with limited service between Seishin-chūō and Itayado the following day, along with the entirety of the Hokushin Kyuko line. Limited service was resumed across the entire line on 16 February, and full service was restored in March 1995 after repairs were completed, albeit with speed restrictions remaining in place until 21 July of that year.

The subway began to accept the Surotto Kansai smart card in October 1999; it would start accepting PiTaPa in October 2006.

Women-only cars began to be used on the subway line from 16 December 2002. Currently, one car heading in the direction of Seishin-chūō (car number 4) is reserved for women only; the restriction applies throughout the entire day.

Women-only car
←Seishin-chūō	Shin-Kobe; Tanigami→
1 / 2 / 3 / 4 / 5 / 6

== Stations ==
Name	No.	Name	Distance (km) from Shin-Kobe	Transfers	Location
Hokushin Line	S01	Tanigami	7.5	Shintetsu Arima Line	Kita-ku
Seishin-Yamate Line	S02; S02	Shin-Kobe	0	San'yō Shinkansen; Hokushin Line	Chuo-ku
Seishin-Yamate Line	S03	Sannomiya	1.3	Kaigan Line (K01: Sannomiya-Hanadokeimae Station); JR Kobe Line (Tokaido Main Line) (Sannomiya (JR West)); Hankyu Kobe Line; Hanshin Main Line; Port Liner	Chuo-ku
Seishin-Yamate Line	S04	Kenchōmae	2.2		Chuo-ku
Seishin-Yamate Line	S05	Ōkurayama	3.3		Chuo-ku
Seishin-Yamate Line	S06	Minatogawa-Kōen	4.3	Shintetsu Arima Line; Kobe Kosoku Line (Minatogawa Station)	Hyōgo-ku
Seishin-Yamate Line	S07	Kamisawa	5.3		Hyōgo-ku
Seishin-Yamate Line	S08	Nagata (Nagatajinjamae)	6.1	Kobe Kosoku Line (Kosoku-Nagata Station)	Nagata-ku
Seishin-Yamate Line	S09	Shin-Nagata	7.6	Kaigan Line (K10); JR Kobe Line (Sanyo Main Line)	Nagata-ku
Seishin-Yamate Line	S10	Itayado	8.8	Sanyo Railway Main Line	Nagata-ku
Seishin-Yamate Line	S11	Myōhōji	11.7		Suma-ku
Seishin-Yamate Line	S12	Myōdani	13.3		Suma-ku
Seishin-Yamate Line	S13	Sōgō Undō Kōen	15.1		Suma-ku
Seishin-Yamate Line	S14	Gakuen-Toshi	16.8		Nishi-ku
Seishin-Yamate Line	S15	Ikawadani	18.4		Nishi-ku
Seishin-Yamate Line	S16	Seishin-Minami	20.1		Nishi-ku
Seishin-Yamate Line	S17	Seishin-Chuo	22.7		Nishi-ku

== Rolling stock ==
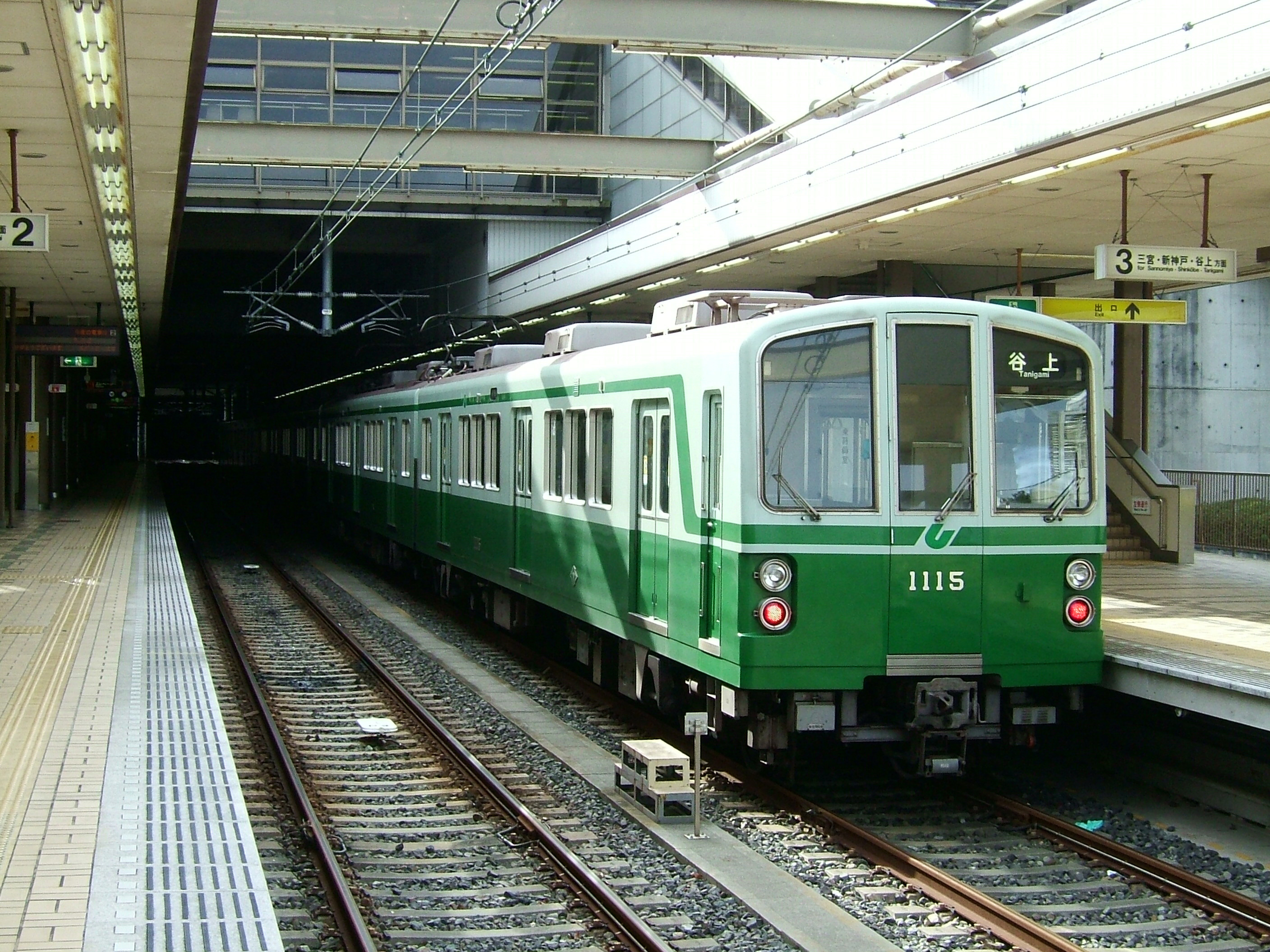
A 1000 series train in January 2008

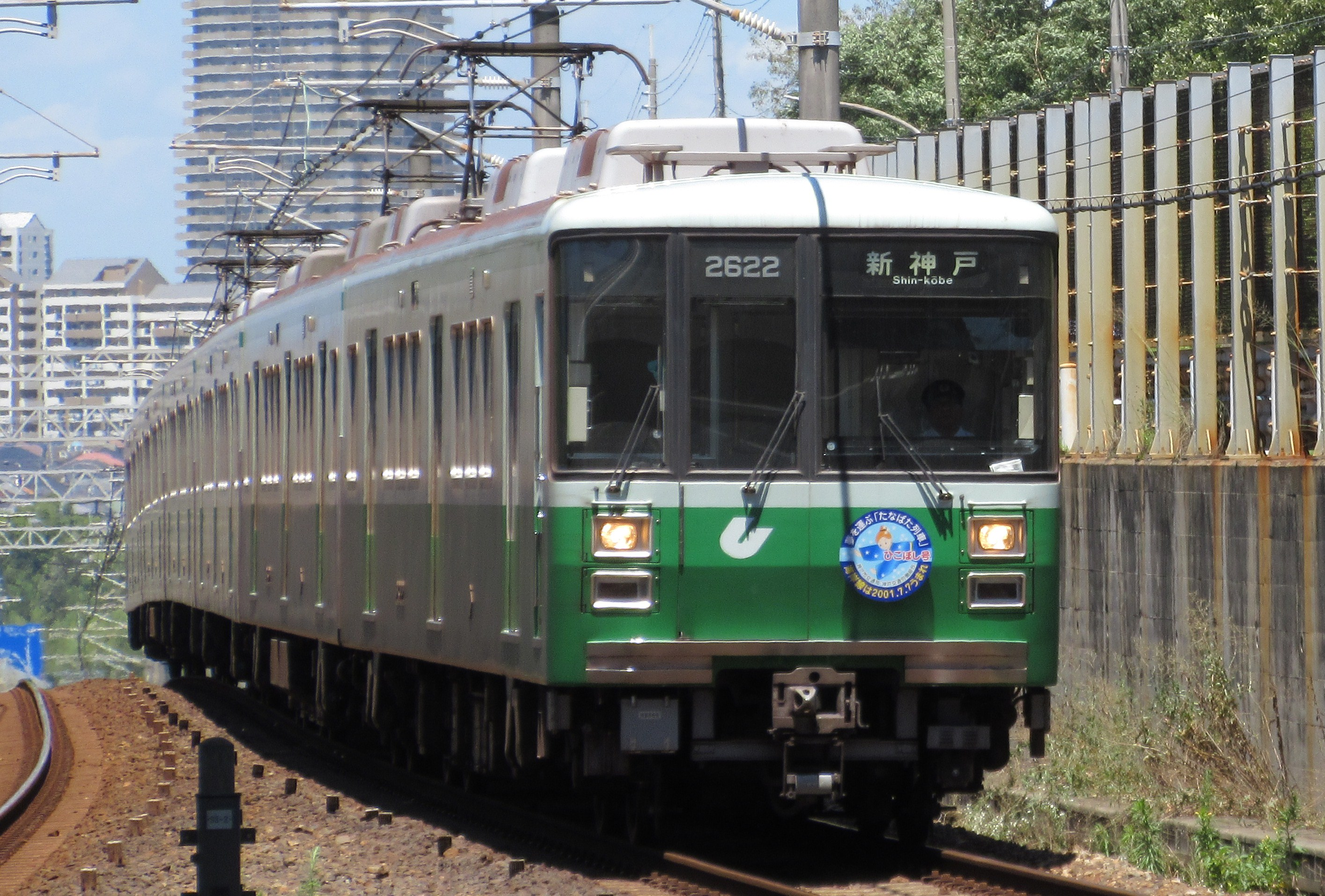
A 2000 series train in 2015

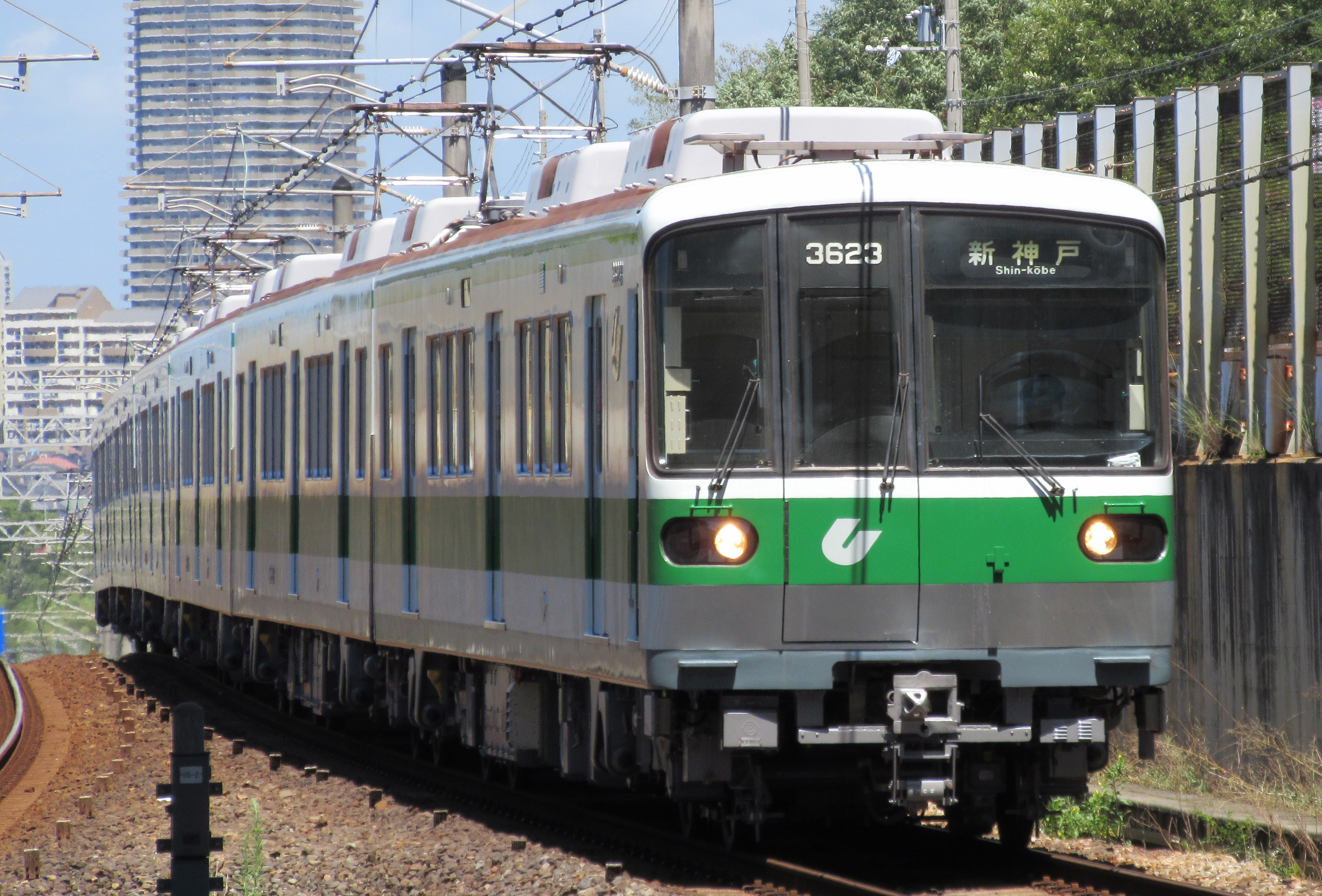
A 3000 series train in 2015

=== Current Rolling Stock ===
- 6000 series (since 2019) (29 6-car sets)

=== Former Rolling Stock ===
- 1000 series[ja] (1977–2023) (18 6-car sets). Withdrawn on August 17, 2023
- 2000 series[ja] (1988–2022) (4 6-car sets). Withdrawn on March 19, 2022
- 3000 series[ja] (1992–2021) (6 6-car sets). Withdrawn on July 24, 2021
- Hokushin Kyuko Railway 7000 series[ja] (1988–2023). Initially 5 sets, 2 of which were withdrawn in 2022. The remaining 3 sets withdrawn on August 17, 2023.

All trains are based at Tanigami and Myōdani Depots.

== See also ==
- List of railway lines in Japan
