= Hokushin Line =

Railway line in Kobe, Hyogo prefecture, Japan

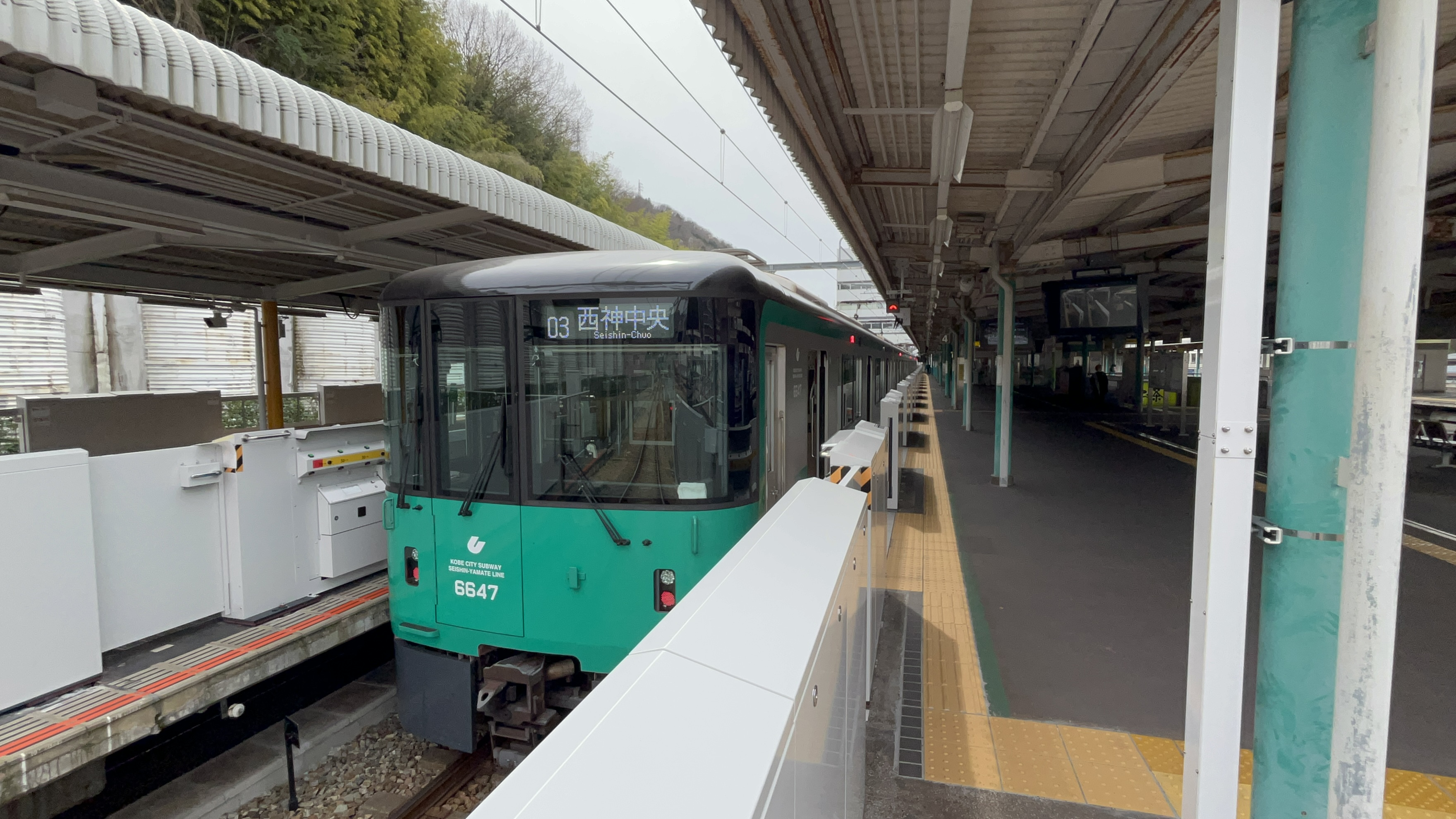
- 6000 series train

Overview
- Native name: 北神線
- Status: Operational
- Owner: Hokushin Kyuko Railway (Hankyu Hanshin Toho Group) (1988–2020); Kobe Municipal Transportation Bureau (2020–)
- Locale: Kobe
- Termini: Shin-Kobe; Tanigami
- Stations: 2

Service
- Type: Rapid transit
- System: Kobe Municipal Subway
- Operator: Kobe Municipal Transportation Bureau
- Depot: Tanigami
- Rolling stock: 7000 series

History
- Opened: 2 April 1988; 38 years ago

Technical
- Line length: 7.5 km (4.7 mi)
- Num of tracks: 2
- Track gauge: 1,435 mm (4 ft 8 1/2 in) standard gauge
- Electrification: 1,500 V DC overhead catenary
- Operating speed: 75 km/h (47 mph)
Route map
Kobe subway lines

The Hokushin Line (北神線, Hokushin-sen) is a line of Kobe Municipal Subway connecting Tanigami in Kita-ku, Kobe and Shin-Kobe in Chūō-ku, Kobe. The 7.5-kilometer (4.7 mi) line has only these two stations.

Formerly operated by the third-sector Hokushin Kyuko Electric Railway (ja:北神急行電鉄; a subsidiary of Hankyu Hanshin Toho Group), in 2020 the company was absorbed into the Kobe Municipal Transportation Bureau, and the Hokushin Line became part of the subway network.

== Operations ==
All trains on the line operate a through service to/from Seishin-Chuo on the Seishin-Yamate Line.

== History ==
The Hokushin Line opened on 2 April 1988, including the 7,179 m (23,553 ft) Hokushin Tunnel.

The line was built by Hokushin Kyuko Railway Co., Ltd. (北神急行電鉄株式会社, Hokushin Kyūkō Dentetsu Kabushiki-gaisha), a private railway company in Kobe, Japan. It was headquartered in Kita-ku, Kobe. Investors in the company included Hankyu Railway and Kobe Electric Railway, and it was a subsidiary of Hankyu Hanshin Holdings. On 4 March 2020, the Kobe Municipal Transportation Bureau announced that it would acquire Hokushin Kyuko Railway Co., Ltd. due to the heavy debt burden that had been incurred by Hokushin Kyuko; the transaction was completed on 31 May, after which operation of the Hokushin Line was transferred to the transportation bureau.

Kobe Municipal Transportation Bureau commenced operating the line on June 1, 2020.
