= Nunobiki Falls =

Coordinates: 34°42′35″N 135°11′38″E

Ontaki, the greatest fall of the Nunobiki Falls.

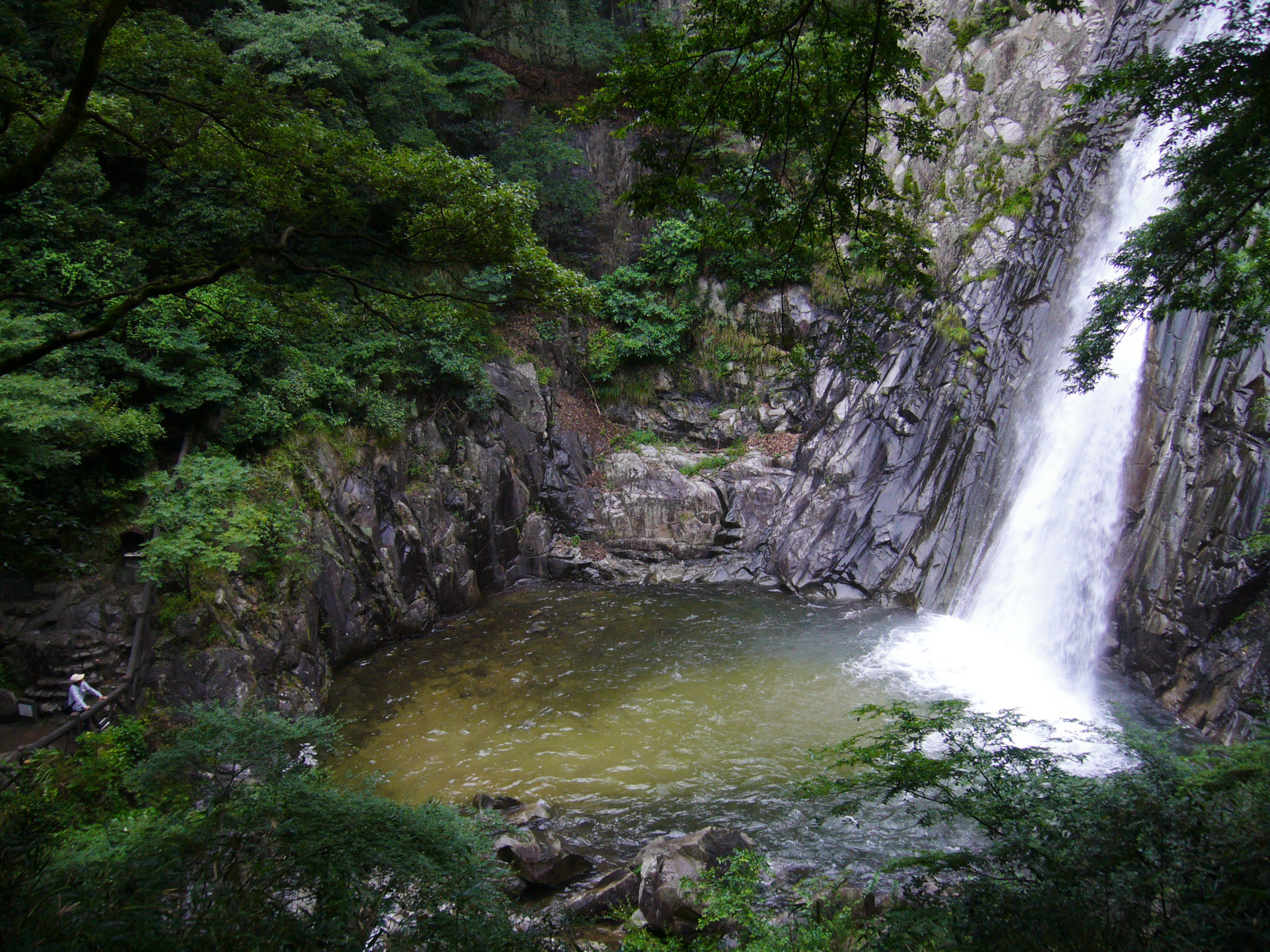
View of Ontaki

Nunobiki waterfall near Kobe in Japan. Kusakabe Kimbei, around 1890

Nunobiki Falls (布引の滝, Nunobiki no Taki) is a set of waterfalls near downtown Kobe, Japan, with an important significance in Japanese literature and Japanese art. In Japan, Nunobiki is considered one of the greatest "divine falls" together with Kegon Falls and Nachi Falls.

Nunobiki waterfalls comprises four separate falls: Ontaki, Mentaki, Tsutsumigadaki, and Meotodaki.

== Tales of Ise ==
A well-known section of the Tales of Ise (Ise monogatari) describes a trip taken by a minor official and his guests to Nunobiki Falls. They begin a poetry-writing contest, to which one of the guests, a commander of the guards, contributes:

Which, I wonder, is higher-
This waterfall or the fall of my tears
As I wait in vain,
Hoping today or tomorrow
To rise in the world.

The minor official offers his own composition:

It looks as though someone
Must be unstringing
Those clear cascading gems.
Alas! My sleeves are too narrow
To hold them all.

== See also ==
- List of waterfalls
- List of waterfalls in Japan
