= Tanigami Station =

Metro station in Kobe, Japan

Coordinates: 34.761693°N 135.17149°E

Tanigami 谷上
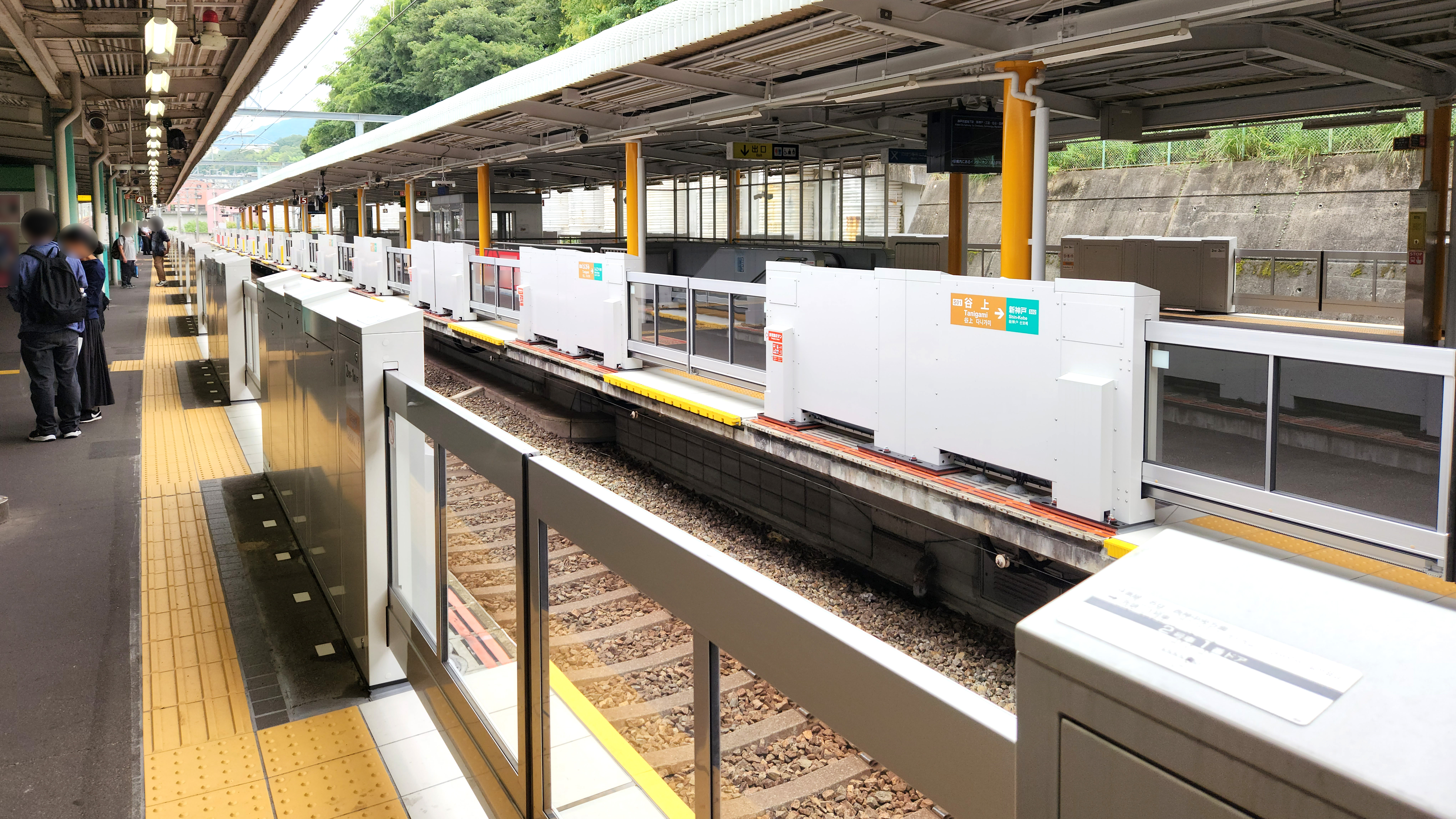
- Platforms 4 and 5, October 2023

General information
- Location: Kita-Ku, Kobe, Hyōgo Prefecture; Japan
- System: Kobe Municipal Subway station
- Operator: Kobe Electric Railway; Kobe Municipal Transportation Bureau
- Lines: Shintetsu Arima Line; Hokushin Line
- Platforms: 3 island platforms
- Tracks: 5

Other information
- Station code: KB10 (Kobe Electric Railway); S01 (Kobe Municipal Subway)

History
- Opened: 28 November 1928; 97 years ago
- Rebuilt: 1988

Services
Preceding station	Kobe Municipal Subway	Following station
Shin-Kobe Terminus	Hokushin Line	Terminus
Location
- Location within Kobe Location within Hyōgo Prefecture Location within Japan

Tanigami Station (谷上駅, Tanigami-eki) is a railway station in northern Kobe, Japan, serving the Shintetsu Arima Line and the Kobe Municipal Subway Hokushin Line.

== Layout ==
Tanigami Station consists of five tracks and three island platforms.

=== Platforms ===
1, 2	■ Shintetsu Arima Line	for Arima-Onsen, Sanda and Woody Town Chūō (every early morning and in the morning and the evening of weekdays)

3	■ Shintetsu Arima Line	for Arima-Onsen, Sanda and Woody Town Chūō for Suzurandai, Shinkaichi, Ao, Ono and Miki
4	■ Kobe Municipal Subway Hokushin Line	for Shin-Kobe, Sannomiya, Myōdani, Gakuen-Toshi and Seishin-Chūō

5	■ Kobe Municipal Subway Hokushin Line	for Shin-Kobe, Sannomiya, Myōdani, Gakuen-Toshi and Seishin-Chūō (same track as No. 4)
6	■ Kobe Municipal Subway Hokushin Line	for Shin-Kobe, Sannomiya, Myōdani, Gakuen-Toshi and Seishin-Chūō (partly)

== Adjacent stations ==
Kobe Electric Railway

Arima Line

Special Rapid Express (特快速, Toku-kaisoku; running only for Shinkaichi)

Yamanomachi (KB08) ← Tanigami (KB10) ← Okaba (KB22)

Express (急行, Kyūkō)

Yamanomachi (KB08) - Tanigami (KB10) - Ōike (KB12)

Local (普通, futsū) / Semi-express (準急, Junkyū)

Minotani (KB09) - Tanigami (KB10) - Hanayama (KB11)
