= Shin-Kōbe Station =

Railway and metro station in Kobe, Japan

Coordinates: 34°42′24″N 135°11′45″E

Shin-Kōbe Station 新神戸駅
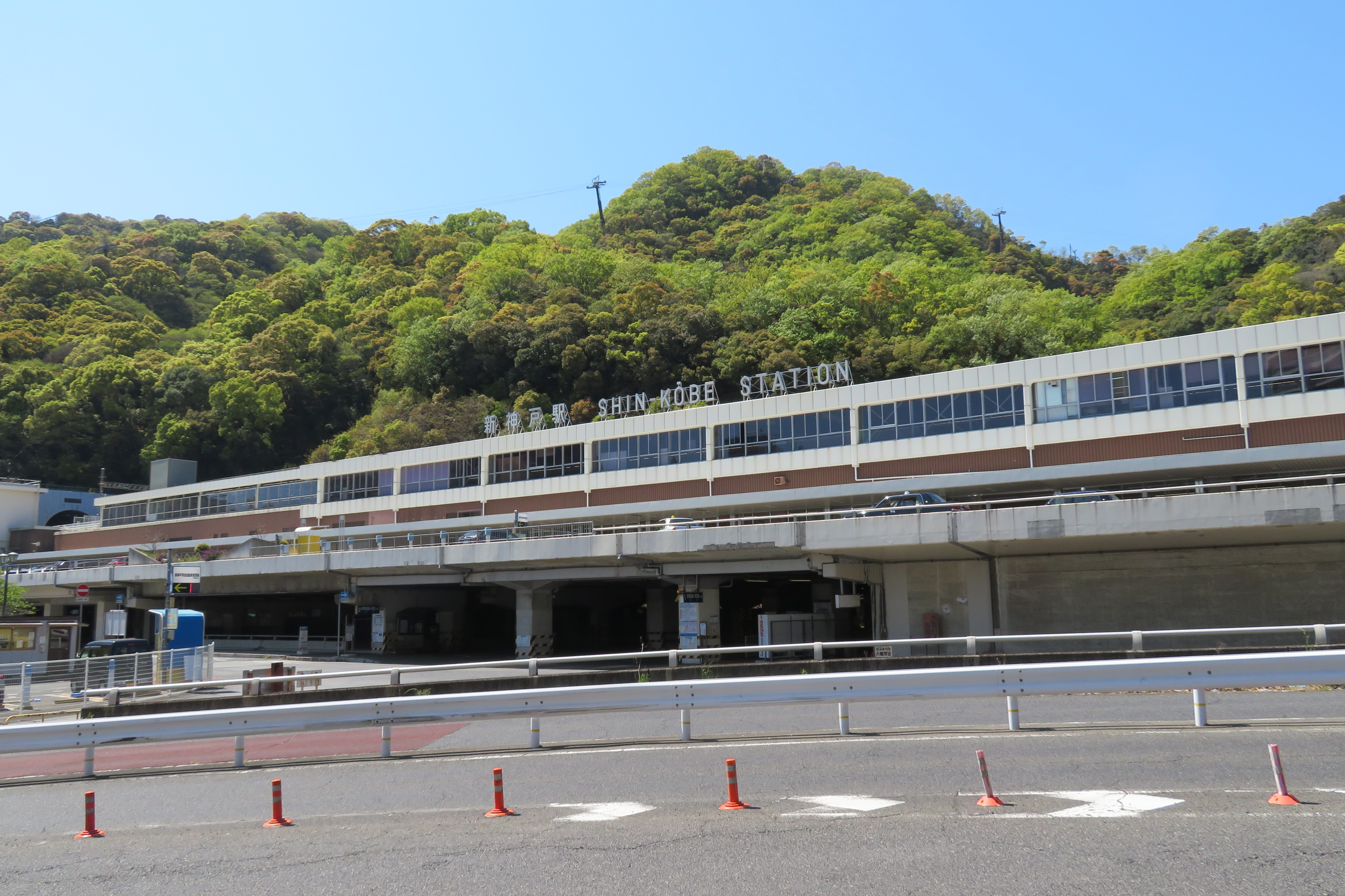
- Station building

General information
- Location: 1 Kanocho Itchome, Chūō-ku, Kobe, Hyōgo-ken; Japan
- System: JR West station Kobe Municipal Subway station
- Operator: JR West; Kobe Municipal Transportation Bureau
- Lines: San'yō Shinkansen; Hokushin Line; Seishin-Yamate Line
- Platforms: 2 side platforms (upper level); 1 island platform and 1 side platform (lower level)
- Tracks: 5

Other information
- Station code: S02 (Kobe Municipal Subway)

History
- Opened: 15 March 1972 (Shinkansen); 18 June 1985 (Kobe Municipal Subway)

Passengers
- FY 2023: 19,248 daily (San-yo Shinkansen); 23,572 daily (Kobe City Subway)
Services
Preceding station	JR West	Following station
Nishi-Akashi towards Hakata	San'yō Shinkansen Nozomi	Shin-Ōsaka Terminus
Nishi-Akashi towards Hakata	San'yō Shinkansen Hikari	Shin-Ōsaka Terminus
Nishi-Akashi towards Hakata or Hakataminami	San'yō Shinkansen Kodama	Shin-Ōsaka Terminus
Himeji towards Hakata	San'yō Shinkansen Mizuho	Shin-Ōsaka Terminus
Himeji towards Hakata	San'yō Shinkansen Sakura	Shin-Ōsaka Terminus
Preceding station	Kobe Municipal Subway	Following station
Terminus	Hokushin Line	Tanigami Terminus
Sannomiya towards Seishin-Chuo	Seishin-Yamate Line	Terminus
Location
- Location within Kobe Location within Hyōgo Prefecture Location within Kansai region Location within Japan

Shin-Kōbe station (Japanese: 新神戸駅, Hepburn: Shin-Kōbe-eki; lit. 'New Kōbe Station') is a railway station on the San'yō Shinkansen and the Seishin-Yamate Line serving the city of Kobe, Japan, and the surrounding area. It is located to the north of Kobe city centre, at the foot of Mount Rokkō. The Shinkansen trains mostly run inside tunnels under the mountains in this area. The station exists in a small space in between two long tunnels (Rokkō and Kobe Tunnels), and bridges the Ikuta River.

This station was newly built for the San'yō Shinkansen and is connected with the city center by the Kobe Municipal Subway.

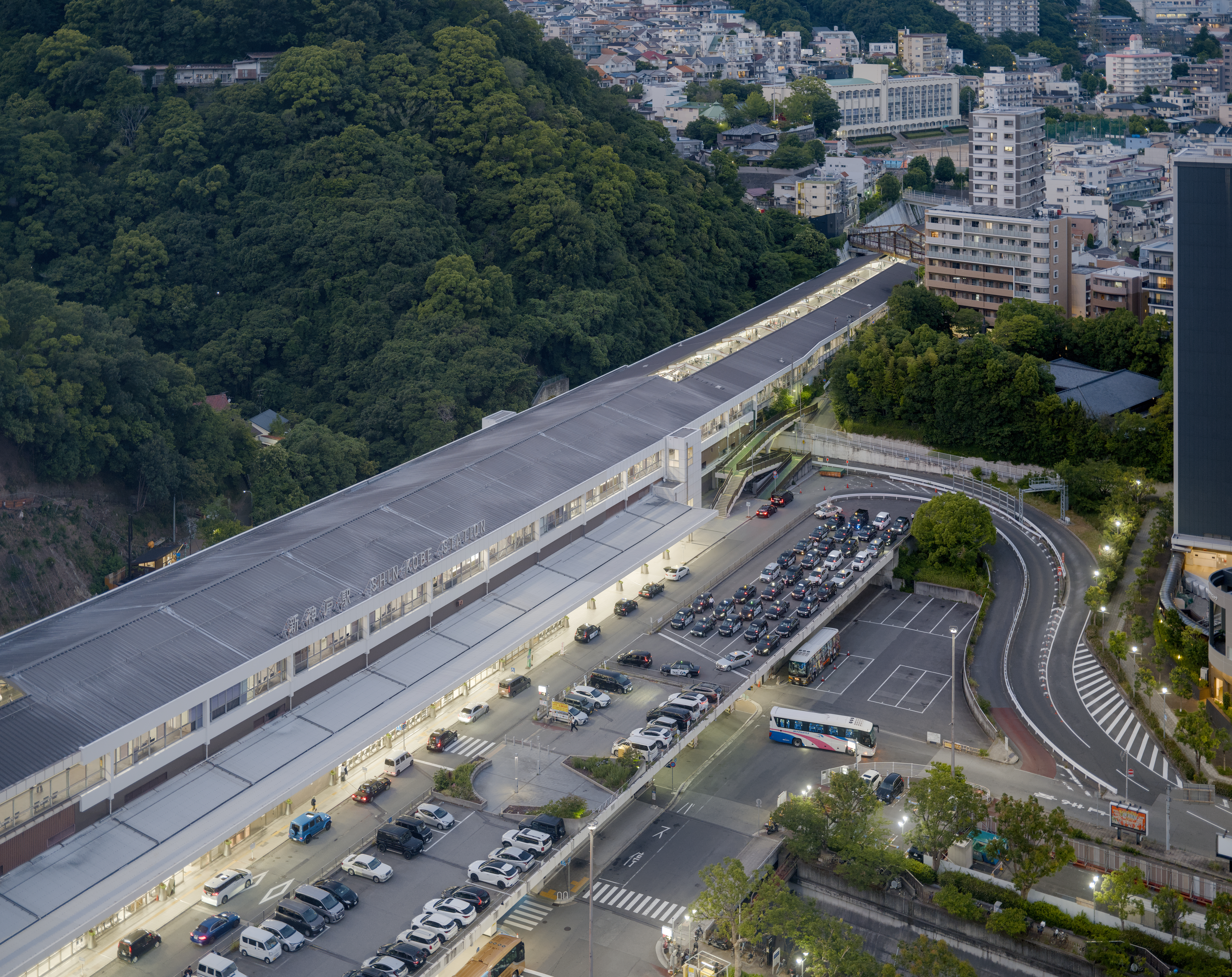
View of the station and forecourt.

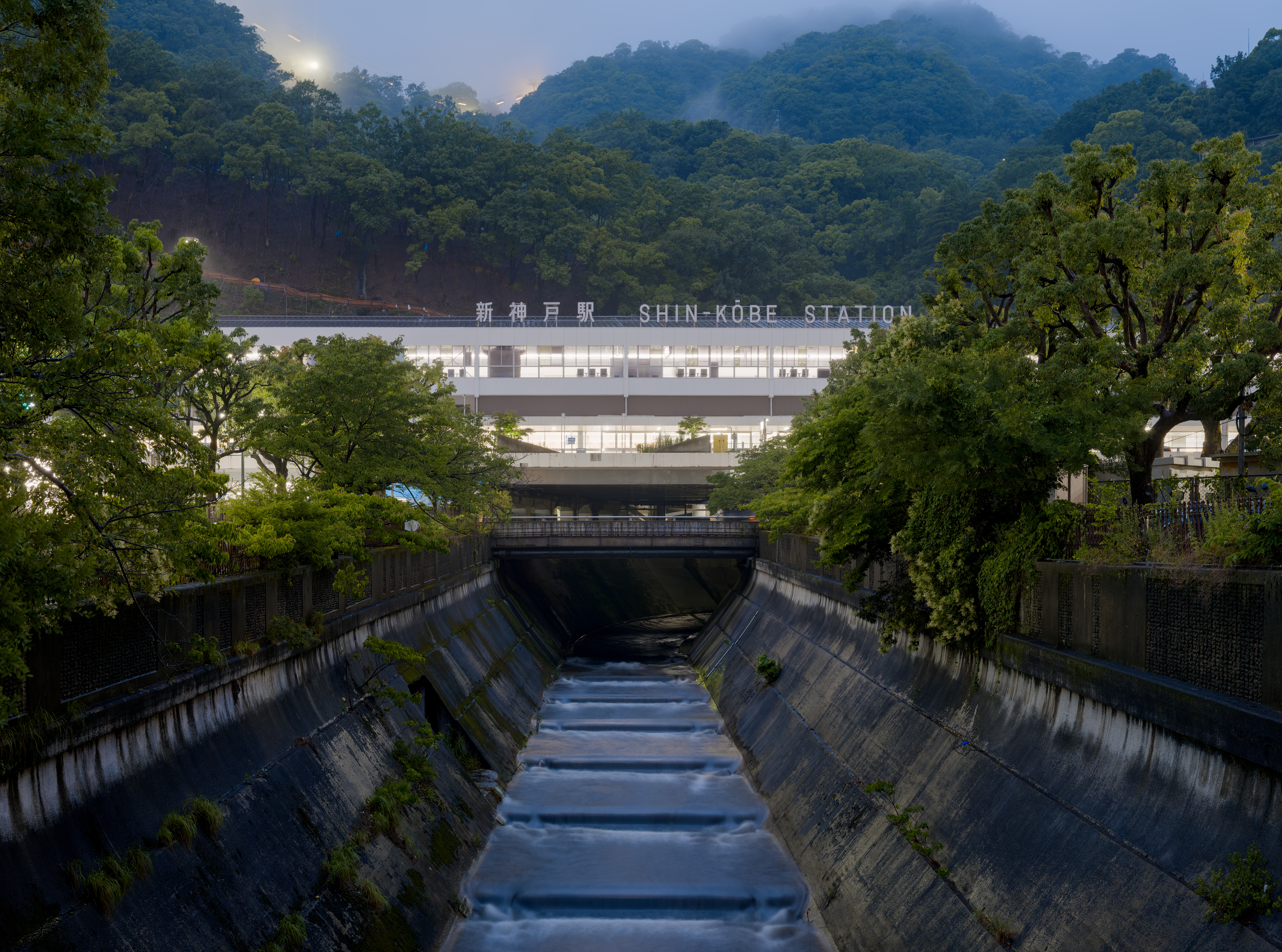
The station bridges the Ikuta river.

== Lines ==
- JR West (San'yō Shinkansen)
- Kobe Municipal Subway (Seishin-Yamate Line and Hokushin Line, station number: S02)

== Layout ==
=== San'yō Shinkansen ===
Two side platforms serving two tracks. Both platforms have platform screen doors.

1	San'yō Shinkansen	for Okayama, Hakata, and Kagoshima-chuo
2	San'yō Shinkansen	for Shin-Ōsaka, Nagoya, and Tokyo

=== Seishin-Yamate Line and Hokushin Line ===
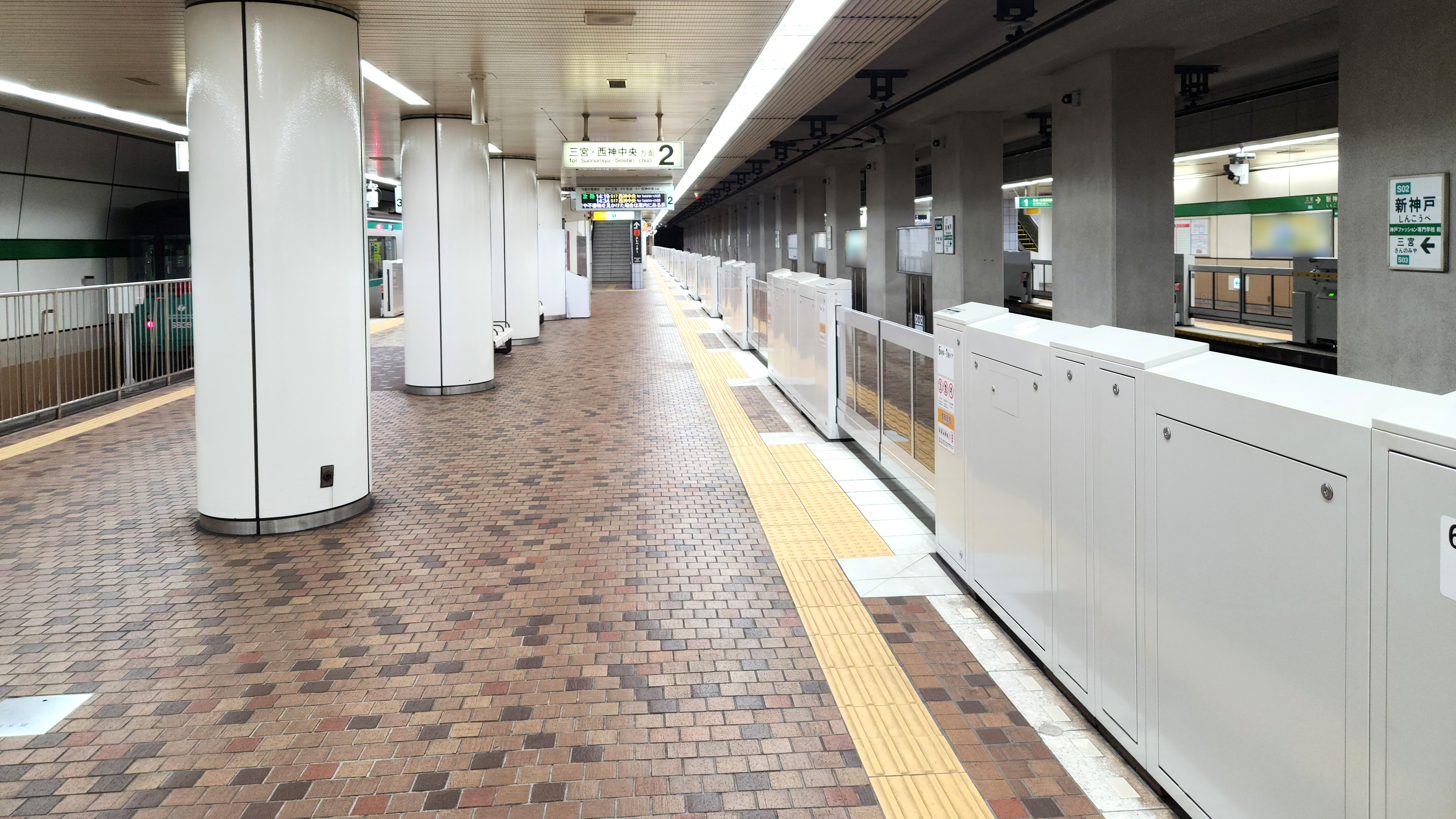
The Kobe Municipal Subway/Hokushin Line platforms

One side platform serving one track and one island platform serving two tracks (one of which is single ended).

1	Hokushin Line	to Tanigami
1	Seishin-Yamate Line	returning for Sannomiya, Myodani, and Seishin-chūō
2	Seishin-Yamate Line	from Tanigami for Sannomiya, Myodani, and Seishin-chūō
3	Seishin-Yamate Line	returning for Sannomiya, Myodani, and Seishin-chūō

== History ==
The Shinkansen station opened on 15 March 1972. The subway station opened on 18 June 1985. With the privatization of Japanese National Railways (JNR) on 1 April 1987, the station came under the control of JR West. The Hokushin Line started operation on 2 April 1988.

On 17 January 1995, the station was affected by the Great Hanshin earthquake, with all services halted. Operations resumed on the Hokushin Line from 18 January, subway services resumed from 16 February, and Sanyo Shinkansen services resumed from 8 April 1995.

From the start of the revised timetable introduced on 1 October 2003, all Nozomi services began stopping at Shin-Kōbe Station.

== Surrounding area ==
- Shin-Kobe Oriental City
- Shin-Kobe Ropeway
- Nunobiki Falls
- Nunobiki Herb Garden
- Maya Cablecar and Maya Ropeway
- Mt. Maya

== See also ==
- List of railway stations in Japan
