= Seishin-chūō Station =

Metro station in Kobe, Japan

Coordinates: 34.7194632°N 135.0175095°E

Seishin-chūō 西神中央
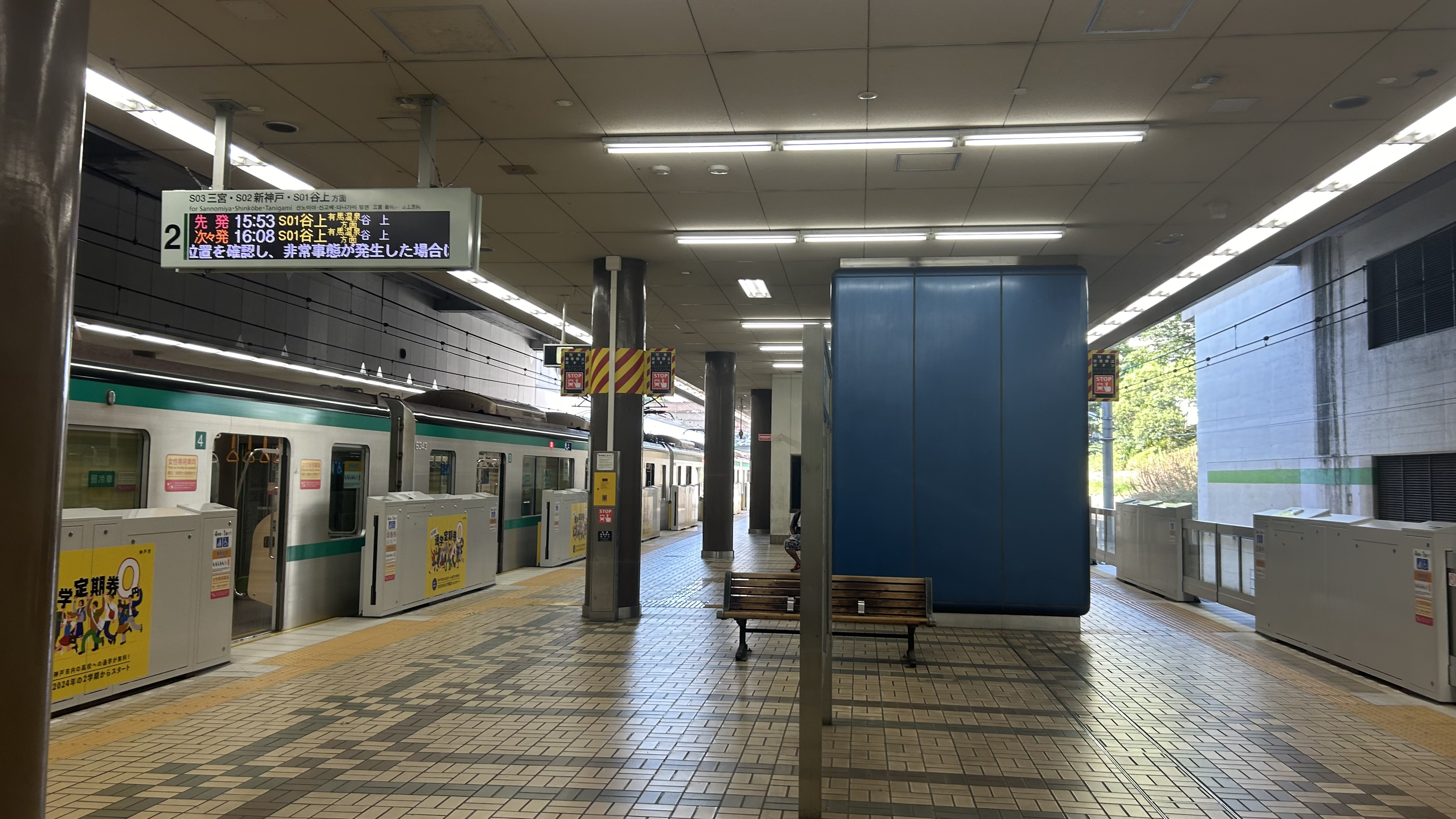
- Station platform

General information
- System: Kobe Municipal Subway station
- Operator: Kobe Municipal Transportation Bureau
- Line: Seishin-Yamate Line
- Platforms: 1 island platform and 1 side platform
- Tracks: 3

Construction
- Structure type: At grade

Other information
- Station code: S17

History
- Opened: 18 March 1987; 39 years ago

Services
Preceding station	Kobe Municipal Subway	Following station
Terminus	Seishin-Yamate Line	Seishin-Minami towards Shin-Kobe
Location
- Location within Kobe Location within Hyōgo Prefecture Location within Japan

Seishin-Chūō Station (西神中央駅, Seishin-Chūō-eki) is a railway station in Nishi-ku, Kobe, Hyōgo Prefecture, Japan.

== Lines ==
- Kobe Municipal Subway

- Seishin-Yamate Line Station S17

== Layout ==
Platform 1 is for departure trains from the depot.

It's usually turned back on lines 2 and 3. The parking at the depot will be done on Platform 2 and 3.

1	■ Seishin-Yamate Line	for Shin-Kobe and Tanigami
2	■ Seishin-Yamate Line	for Shin-Kobe and Tanigami
3	■ Seishin-Yamate Line	for Shin-Kobe and Tanigami

== History ==
The station opened on 18 March 1987.
