= Kobe Municipal Transportation Bureau =

Kōbe Municipal Transportation Bureau

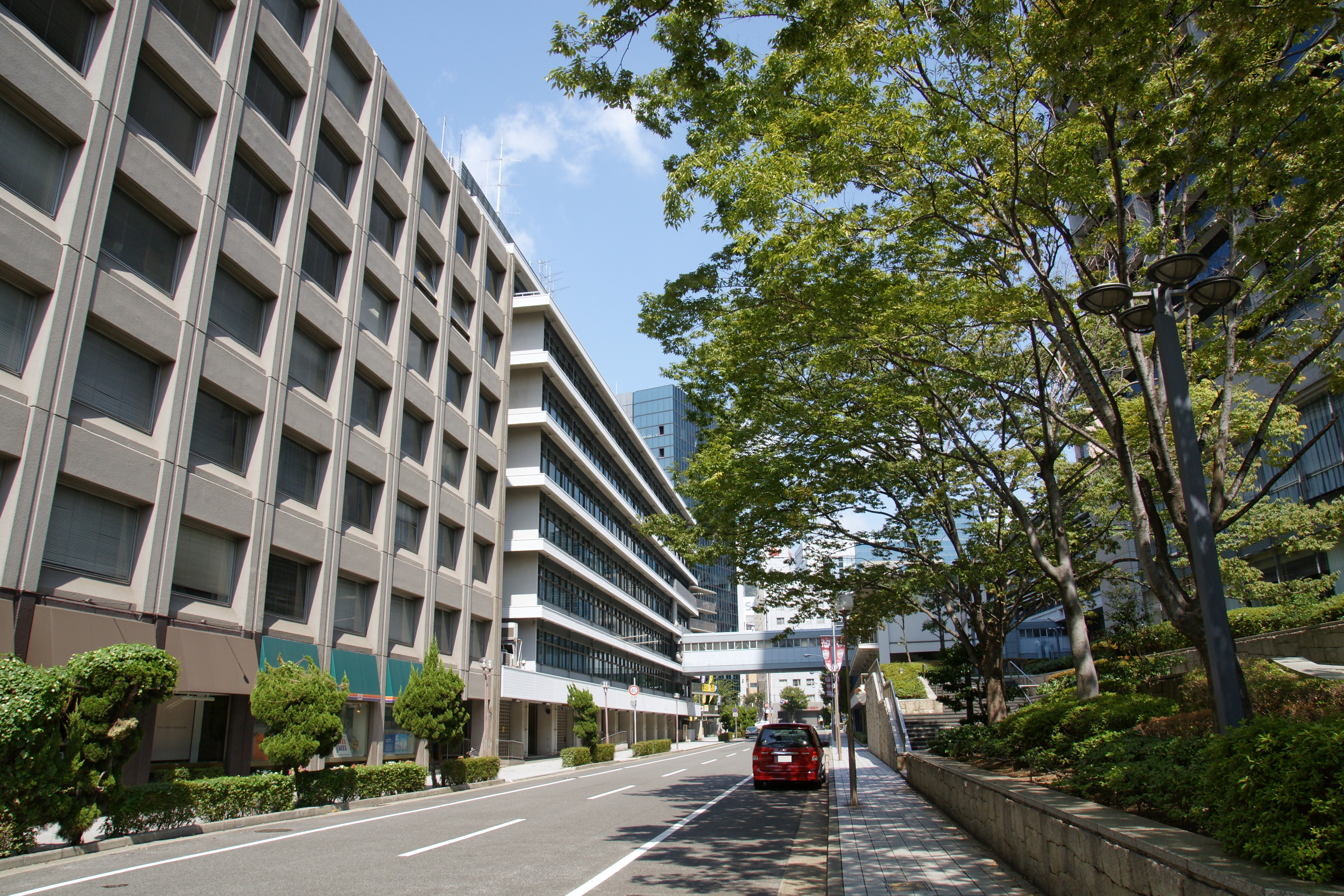
- Kobe Municipal Transportation Bureau headquarters
- Native name: 神戸市交通局
- Romanized name: Kōbe-shi kōtsū-kyoku
- Company type: Transportation authority
- Industry: Transportation
- Founded: 1 August 1917
- Headquarters: Hyogo-ku, Kobe, Japan
- Website: Official website

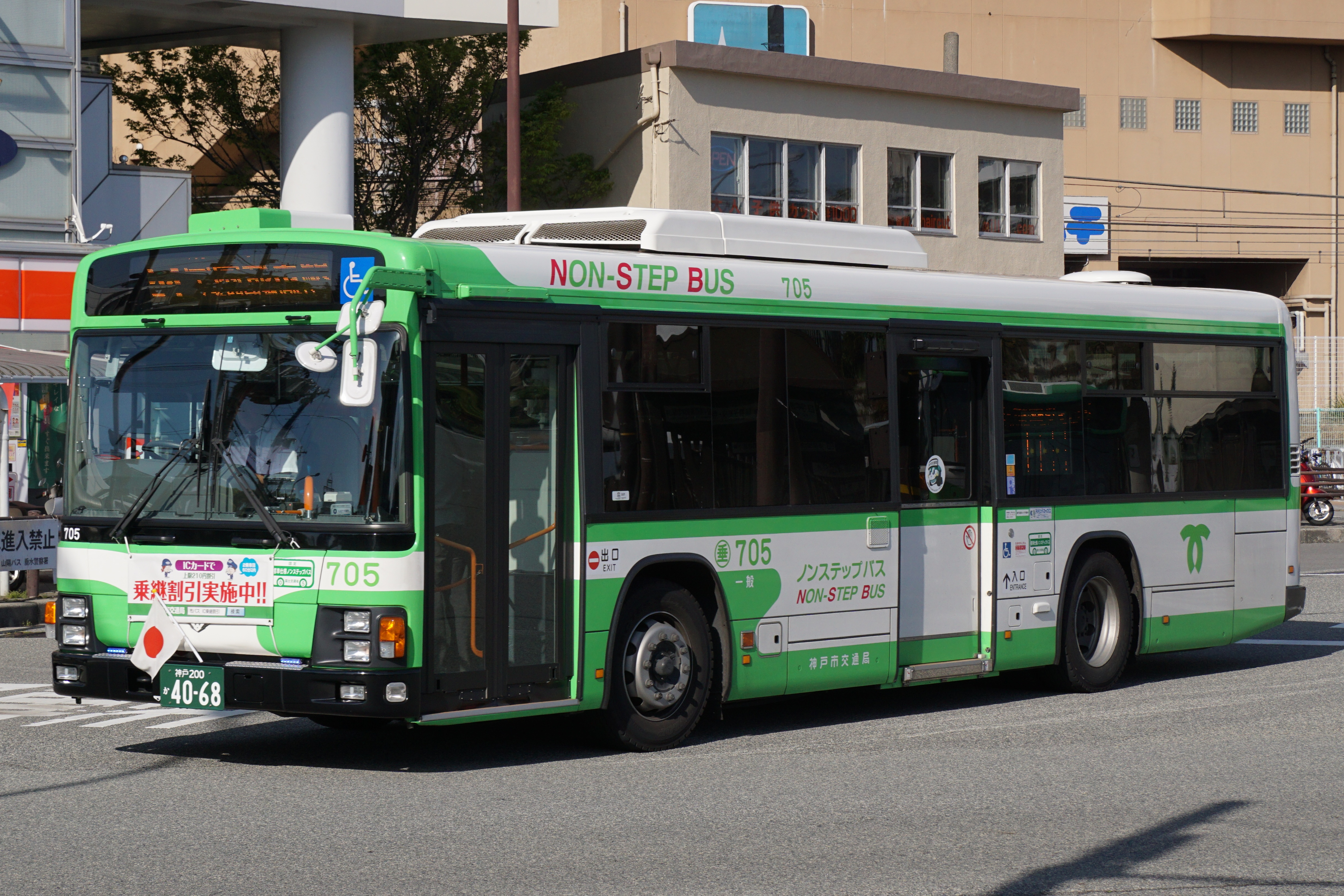
Kobe City Bus

Kōbe Municipal Transportation Bureau (神戸市交通局, Kōbe-shi kōtsū-kyoku) is an agency of the city government of Kobe, Japan that operates municipal subways and city buses. Previously, it also operated city trams.

== Subway ==
- Kobe Municipal Subway
  - Seishin-Yamate Line
  - Kaigan Line
  - Hokushin Line

== Bus ==
- Kobe City Bus

== Tram ==
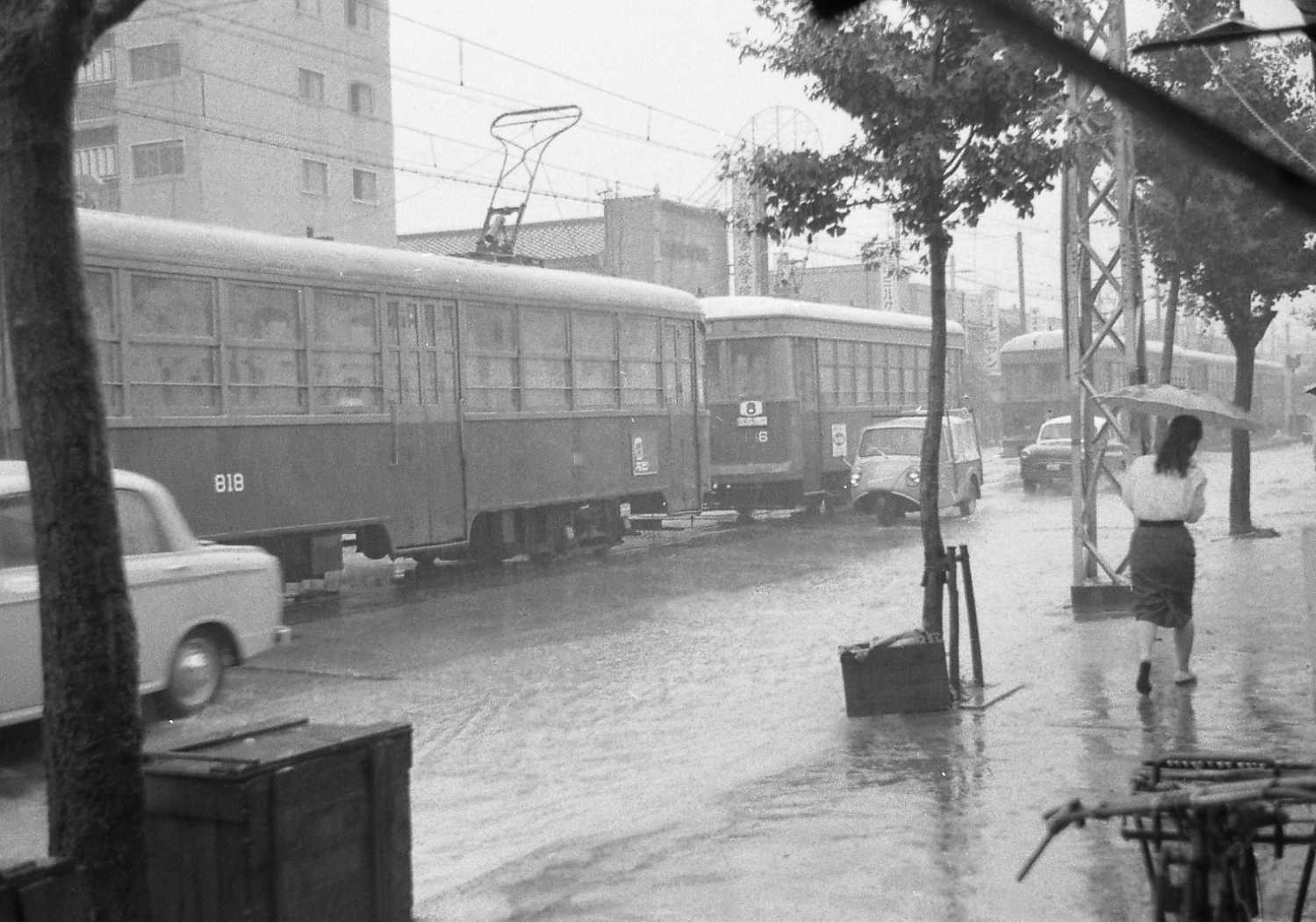
Kobe City Tram in 1961

The city tram of Kobe opened in 1910 by a private company and was purchased by the city government in 1917. As of 1952, it operated 35.6 km of tracks. The tram system was totally abolished by 1971. Between 1917 and 1971, the trams operated approximately 600 million kilometers and transported 5.6 billion passengers.
