= List of Kobe Municipal Subway stations =

Kobe Municipal Subway network map

There are currently 28 stations on the Kobe Municipal Subway network operated by the Kobe Municipal Transportation Bureau. The first section to open was the Seishin-Yamate Line, which began operation in March 1977 between Myōdani Station and Shin-Nagata Station. As of 2025, the network extends approximately 38.1 km (23.7 mi) and serves several key districts of Kobe through three distinct lines: the Seishin-Yamate Line, the Kaigan Line, and the Hokushin Line.

== Overview ==
- Seishin-Yamate Line: The primary line connecting Seishin-chūō to Shin-Kobe, passing through major hubs like Sannomiya.
- Kaigan Line: Also known as the "Yumekamome," this automated line connects Sannomiya-Hanadokeimae to Shin-Nagata along the coastal area.
- Hokushin Line: A northern extension from Shin-Kobe to Tanigami, which was fully municipalized in 2020.

== Stations ==
=== Hokushin Line and Seishin-Yamate Line ===
No.	Name	Japanese	Distance (km) from Shin-Kobe	Transfers	Line	Location
S01	Tanigami	谷上	–7.5	Shintetsu Arima Line	Hokushin Line	Kita-ku
S02	Shin-Kobe	新神戸	0.0	San'yō Shinkansen; Hokushin Line	Seishin-Yamate Line	Chuo-ku
S03	Sannomiya	三宮	1.3	Kaigan Line (K01: Sannomiya-Hanadokeimae Station); JR Kobe Line (Tokaido Main Line) (Sannomiya (JR West)); Hankyu Kobe Line; Hanshin Main Line; Port Liner	Seishin-Yamate Line	Chuo-ku
S04	Kenchōmae	県庁前	2.2		Seishin-Yamate Line	Chuo-ku
S05	Ōkurayama	大倉山 （湊川神社前）	3.3		Seishin-Yamate Line	Chuo-ku
S06	Minatogawa-Kōen	湊川公園 （川崎病院前）	4.3	Shintetsu Arima Line; Kobe Kosoku Line (Minatogawa Station)	Seishin-Yamate Line	Hyōgo-ku
S07	Kamisawa	上沢	5.3		Seishin-Yamate Line	Hyōgo-ku
S08	Nagata (Nagatajinjamae)	長田（長田神社前）	6.1	Kobe Kosoku Line (Kosoku-Nagata Station)	Seishin-Yamate Line	Nagata-ku
S09	Shin-Nagata	新長田（鉄人28号前）	7.6	Kaigan Line (K10); JR Kobe Line (Sanyo Main Line)	Seishin-Yamate Line	Nagata-ku
S10	Itayado	板宿 （滝川中学・高等学校前）	8.8	Sanyo Railway Main Line	Seishin-Yamate Line	Nagata-ku
S11	Myōhōji	妙法寺	11.7		Seishin-Yamate Line	Suma-ku
S12	Myōdani	名谷	13.3		Seishin-Yamate Line	Suma-ku
S13	Sōgō Undō Kōen	総合運動公園	15.1		Seishin-Yamate Line	Suma-ku
S14	Gakuen-Toshi	学園都市	16.8		Seishin-Yamate Line	Nishi-ku
S15	Ikawadani	伊川谷	18.4		Seishin-Yamate Line	Nishi-ku
S16	Seishin-Minami	西神南	20.1		Seishin-Yamate Line	Nishi-ku
S17	Seishin-Chuo	西神中央	22.7		Seishin-Yamate Line	Nishi-ku

=== Kaigan Line ===
No.	Name	Japanese	Inter-station distance (km)	Total distance (km)	Transfers
K01	Sannomiya-Hanadokeimae	三宮・花時計前	-	0.0	Seishin-Yamate Line (Sannomiya: S03); Hankyu Kobe Line; Kōbe Kōsoku Line (Sannomiya); Hanshin Main Line (Sannomiya); Port Island Line (Sannomiya: P01); Tōkaidō Main Line (JR Kobe Line) (Sannomiya (JR))
K02	Kyukyoryuchi-Daimarumae	旧居留地・大丸前	0.5	0.5	Tōkaidō Main Line (JR Kobe Line) (Motomachi); Hanshin Main Line; Kōbe Kōsoku Line (Motomachi)
K03	Minato Motomachi	みなと元町 (ワコーレ和田興産前)	0.8	1.3	
K04	Harborland	ハーバーランド (デュオこうべ前)	1.0	2.3	Tōkaidō Main Line, San'yō Main Line (JR Kobe Line) (Kobe); Kōbe Kōsoku Line (Kosoku Kobe)
K05	Chūō-Ichibamae	中央市場前	1.4	3.7	
K06	Wadamisaki	和田岬 (三菱神戸病院前)	0.9	4.6	San'yō Main Line (Wadamisaki Line)
K07	Misaki-Kōen	御崎公園	1.1	5.7	
K08	Karumo	苅藻 (三ツ星ベルト前)	0.8	6.5	
K09	Komagabayashi	駒ヶ林 (三国志のまち・アグロガーデン前)	0.8	7.3	
K10	Shin-Nagata	新長田 (鉄人28号前)	0.6	7.9	Seishin-Yamate Line (S09); San'yō Main Line (JR Kobe Line)
