= 2001 in rail transport =

This article lists events related to rail transport that occurred in 2001.

== Events ==
=== January events ===
- January 17 – Groundbreaking ceremonies are held for the Hiawatha Line in Minneapolis, Minnesota.

=== February events ===
- February 8 – Section of the Rinkai Line between Tennozu Isle and Tokyo Teleport stations in Tokyo opens for service.
- February 12 – Construction begins on KCR Ma On Shan Rail in Hong Kong.

=== March events ===
- March 21 – An EMD JT42CWR (Series 66) becomes the first American-built diesel locomotive to cross the Germany-Switzerland border as it leads a container train from Cologne to Mutenz.
- March 28 – Saitama Rapid Railway Line, Akabane-Iwabuchi to Urawa-Misono route officially completed, with Urawa-Misono via Tokyo Metro Namboku Line to Tokyu Meguro Line Musashi-Kosugi route direct commuter train service to start in Japan.

=== April events ===
- April 3 – The European Union approves Bombardier's acquisition of Adtranz.

=== May events ===
- May – Varshavsky railway station in Saint Petersburg, Russia, is closed and facilities transferred elsewhere.
- May 16 – The 43.5 kilometres (27.0 mi) stretch of railway between Murska Sobota, Slovenia, and Zalalövő, Hungary, is opened, in part following the route originally opened in 1907 and dismantled in 1968.
- May 26 – SNCF sets a new speed record in France when TGV train number 531 travels the 1,067.2 km (663.1 mi) between Calais and Marseille in 3 hours and 29 minutes at an average speed of 317.46 km/h (197.26 mph).

=== June events ===
- June 7 – SNCF opens the LGV Méditerranée in France, including the new Avignon TGV station.

=== July events ===
- July 1 – Elipsos – a joint-venture company established by the Spanish and French rail companies SNCF and Renfe to run night-time passenger connections from Spain to France, Switzerland, and Italy – begins operations.
- July 7 – Kobe Municipal Subway Kaigan Line, Sannomiya-Hanadokeimae Station, via Wadamisaki Station to Shin-Nagata Station route, officially completed in Hyogo Prefecture, Japan.
- July 12 – The Maitry Express passenger train begins regular revenue service between India and Bangladesh.
- July 20 – The Portland Streetcar, a new modern tram system, is opened.

=== August events ===
- August 16 – After a complete restoration, Canadian Pacific 2816, a 4-6-4 steam locomotive, operates under its own power for the first time in nearly 40 years.
- August 25 – The El Reno Heritage Express heritage trolley commences service in El Reno, Oklahoma.
- August 31 – 66% interest in Eesti Raudtee, the state railway of Estonia, is sold to a private holding company with international investors "Baltic Rail Services".

=== September events ===
- September 5 – The extension of Minsk Metro's Avtozavodskaya Line connecting Avtozavodskaya to Mogilevskaya opens.
- September 10 – The Red Line of Portland, Oregon's MAX Light Rail system, serving the airport, opens.
- September – Remaining rail traffic in Nicaragua suspended.

=== October events ===
- October – Ferrocarriles de Cuba purchases its first six-axle GE diesel locomotives (mostly GE C30-7 models) secondhand from Mexican railroads.
- October 3 – Canadian Pacific Corporation divests itself of its five major subsidiaries, spinning off Canadian Pacific as an independent company.
- October 7 – Railtrack, in England, is placed under legal administration by Stephen Byers, Secretary of State for Transport, effectively renationalizing the system.
- October 9 – Canadian National (CN) purchases Wisconsin Central for US$1.2 billion, giving CN a direct rail link to Chicago, Illinois.

=== November events ===
- November 19 – The Surface Transportation Board releases the final Environmental Impact Statement on Dakota, Minnesota & Eastern Railroad's plan to expand into Wyoming's Powder River Basin.

=== December events ===
- December 11 – Seven members of the Communauté des chemins de fer européens leave to form European Rail Infrastructure Managers.
- December 15 – The Downeaster, a passenger train operated by Amtrak, begins regularly scheduled passenger service between Boston, Massachusetts and Portland, Maine.
- December 17 – MARC extends passenger service to Frederick, Maryland.

== Accidents ==
- January 27 – The Gerogery level crossing accident occurred in Gerogery, Australia and killed five people in a car.
- February 28 – Selby rail crash – A rail accident in Selby, England, leaves 10 dead and 82 injured.
- March 27 – The Pécrot rail crash was a rail accident in the village of Pécrot, Belgium, that killed 8 people.
- July 18 – Howard Street Tunnel fire in Baltimore, Maryland in the United States
- July 21 – Four passenger cars on the Mangalore Mail commuter train heading for Chennai derail while crossing the Kadalundi River near Calicut, India, killing 57 people. See: Kadalundi River rail disaster.
- August 10 – The 2001 Angola train attack killed 252 when UNITA rebels derailed a train in Dondo, Angola.
- August 19 – The Udarata Menike express passenger service from Kurunegala to Alawwa, Sri Lanka, derails on newly installed track, killing 15 passengers in what has come to be known as the Kurunegala train crash.
- October 31 – A broken rail on the SNCF in France derails a TGV train travelling at 130 km/h (80.8 mph), but only six minor injuries result.
- November 15 – Two Canadian National trains collide head-on in Andersonville, Michigan (northwest of Detroit).
- December 23 – An incorrect brake application on a CSX local train that had stopped to perform switching at Kodak Park (Charlotte, New York) causes the train to run away and derail five miles (8 km) later, destroying homes and businesses in the area.

== Deaths ==
=== January deaths ===
- January 30 – O Winston Link, American photographer who documented the end of steam locomotive use on the Norfolk and Western Railway in the 1950s (b. 1914).

== Industry awards ==
=== Japan ===
Awards presented by Japan Railfan Club

- 2001 Blue Ribbon Award: JR Kyushu 885 series Shiroi Kamome EMU
- 2001 Laurel Prize:
  - Nagoya Railroad Mo 800 tramcar
  - Kintetsu 3220/5820/9020 series "Series-21" EMU

=== North America ===
2001 E. H. Harriman Awards

| Group | Gold medal | Silver medal | Bronze medal |
|---|---|---|---|
| A | Norfolk Southern | | |
| B | | | |
| C | | | |
| S&T | | Belt Railway of Chicago | |

Awards presented by Railway Age magazine

- 2001 Railroader of the Year: Mike Haverty (ATSF, KCS)
- 2001 Regional Railroad of the Year: Wisconsin & Southern Railroad
- 2001 Short Line Railroad of the Year: South Buffalo Railway

=== United Kingdom ===
Train Operator of the Year

- 2001:
