= 207 series (JR West) =

Japanese train type

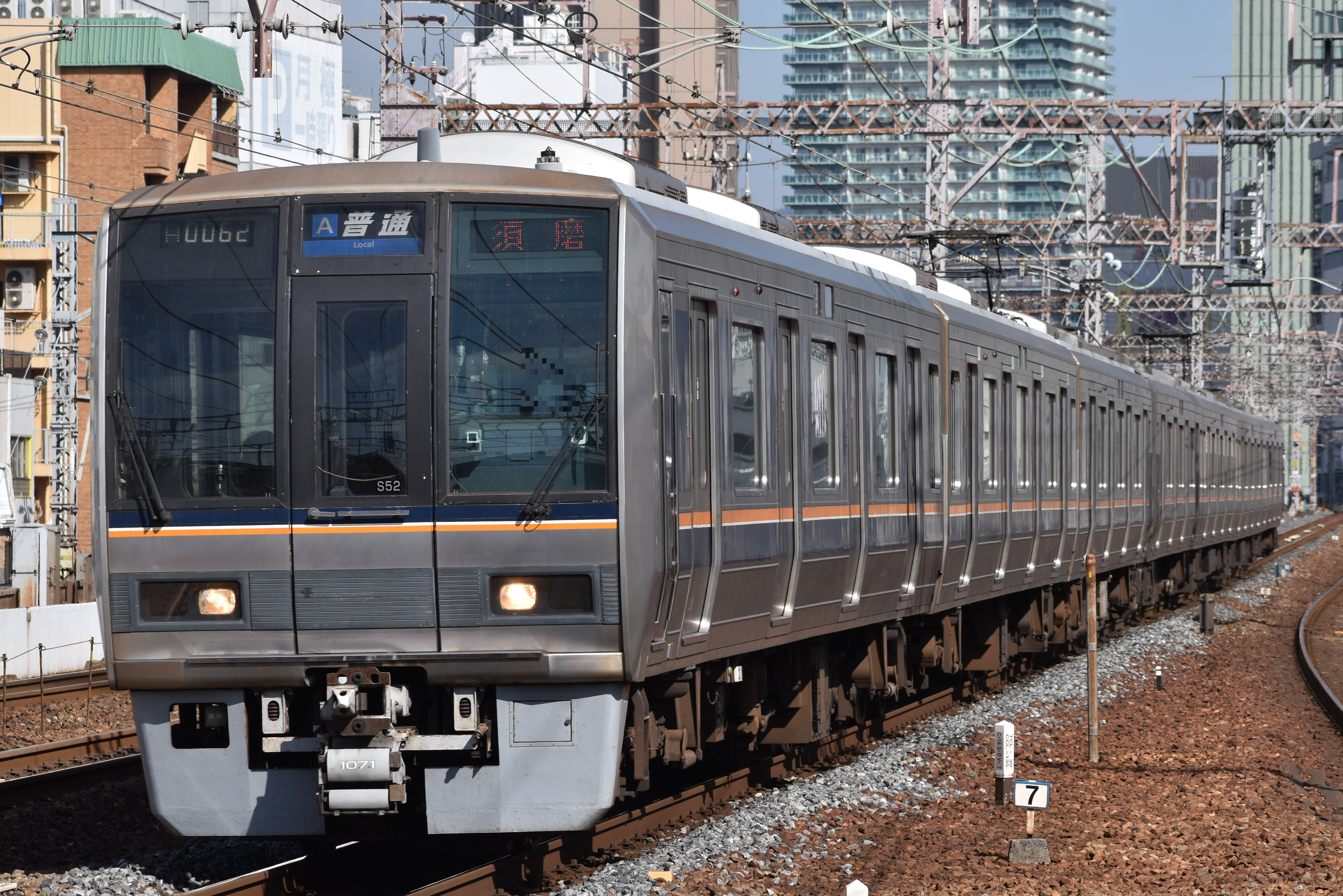
- 207-1000 series set S52 in revised livery, February 2021
- Manufacturers: JR-West Gotō Works, JR-West Takatori Works, Hitachi, Kawasaki Heavy Industries, Kinki Sharyo
- Replaced: 101 series, 103 series, 223-6000 series
- Constructed: 1991–2003
- Entered service: 30 April 1991
- Refurbished: 2014–
- Number built: 484 vehicles
- Number in service: 470 vehicles
- Number scrapped: 7 vehicles (set Z16 and S18, accident damage); 7 vehicles (prototype set F1)
- Formation: 3/4/6 and 7 (Pre-series set) cars per trainset
- Fleet numbers: F1 (Prototype), Z1–Z15, Z17–Z23, H1–H16, T1–T30, S1–S67, X1
- Operator: JR-West
- Depot: Aboshi
- Lines served: A Tōkaidō Main Line; A Sanyo Main Line; B Kosei Line; G Fukuchiyama Line; H JR Tōzai Line; H Katamachi Line; Q Yamatoji Line; ■ Wadamisaki Line

Specifications
- Car body construction: Stainless steel
- Car length: 20,000 mm (65 ft 7 in)
- Width: 2,950 mm (9 ft 8 in)
- Doors: 4 pairs per side
- Maximum speed: 120 km/h (75 mph)
- Traction system: Variable frequency: Power transistor (207-0 series); 3-level GTO (207-1000 series); 3-level IGBT (207-2000 series); SiC-MOSFET (refurbished 207-0 series)
- Acceleration: 2.7 km/(h⋅s) (1.7 mph/s)
- Deceleration: 3.5 km/(h⋅s) (2.2 mph/s) (service); 4.2 km/(h⋅s) (2.6 mph/s) (emergency)
- Electric system: 1,500 V DC
- Current collection: WPS22A scissors-type pantograph
- Braking systems: Electronically controlled pneumatic brakes with regenerative braking, snow-resistant brake
- Safety system: ATS-SW, ATS-P
- Track gauge: 1,067 mm (3 ft 6 in)

The 207 series (207系, 207-kei) is a DC electric multiple unit (EMU) commuter train type operated by West Japan Railway Company (JR-West) in the Kansai Region of Japan since 1991.

This train bears no relation to the 207 series built by JNR and operated by JR East until 2009.

== Background and history ==
The 207 series was developed for use on the Katafuku Line (now known as the JR Tozai Line), and also to be the standard commuter train type for JR-West. The type was introduced into service on 30 April 1991, replacing ageing 101 series and 103 series EMUs operating on the Fukuchiyama Line and the Katamachi Line.

The trains were built jointly by Hitachi, JR-West (Goto Factory), Kinki Sharyo, and Kawasaki Heavy Industries.

=== Livery revision ===
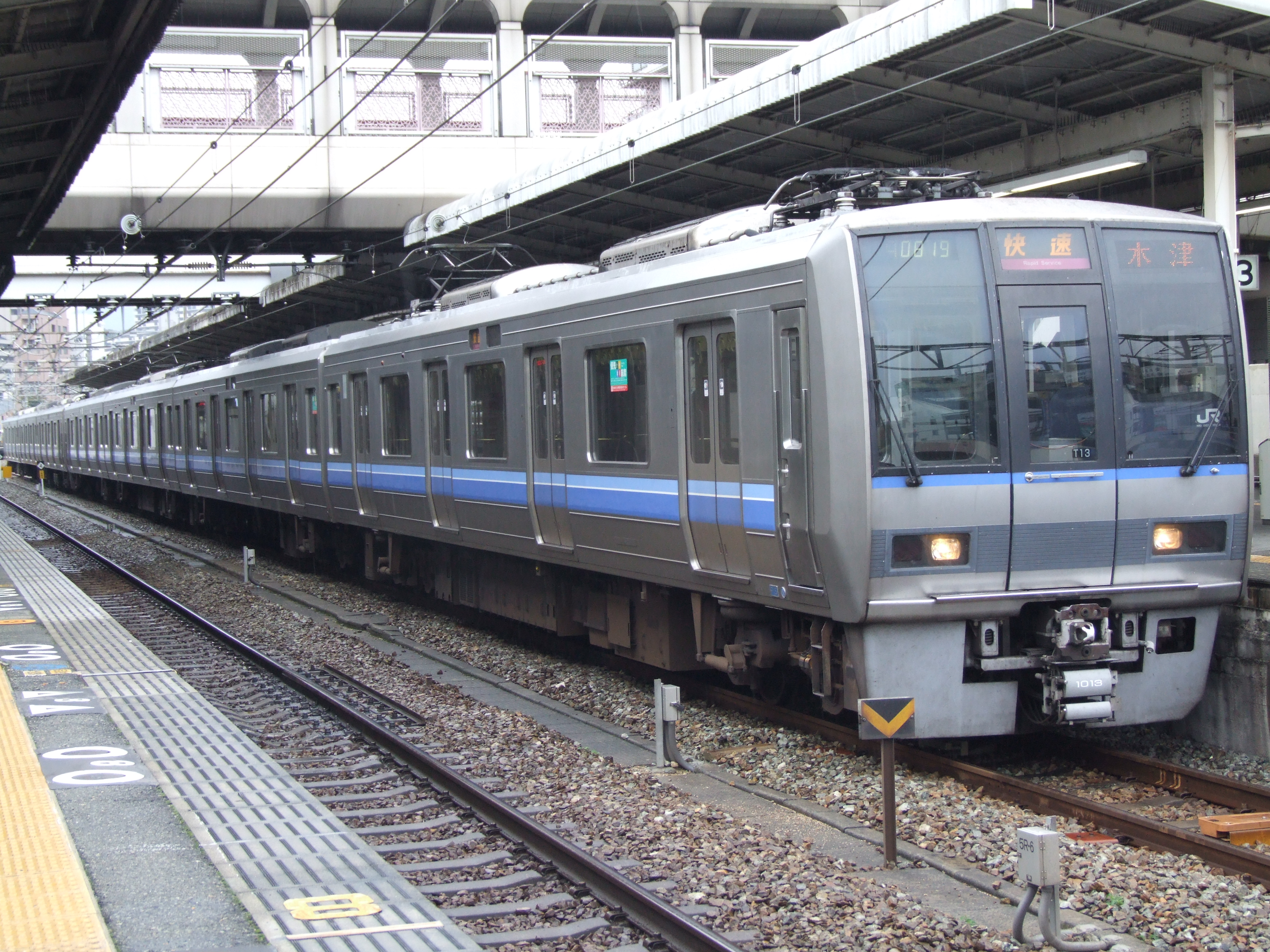
207 series in original livery, October 2005

With the introduction of the 321 series fleet from 2005, the 207 series fleet was re-liveried from its original two-tone blue scheme to a navy-and-orange color scheme, matching that of the 321 series.

=== Refurbishment ===
On 22 September 2014, JR-West announced that the 207 series fleet would undergo a program of refurbishment, aiming to improve the fleet's safety, efficiency, and accessibility. 0-subseries set Z22, the first set to be refurbished, returned to service on 17 November 2014.

During the refurbishment program, the interior was fitted with wheelchair spaces, enlarged seat partitions, newly introduced intermediate seat partitions to make way for vertical grab bars, and LED lighting. External changes include the use of HID headlights, gangway door-mounted wipers, and end car-mounted safety fencing. In addition, the fleet was equipped with fault detection technology, and much of the existing electrical equipment was overhauled.

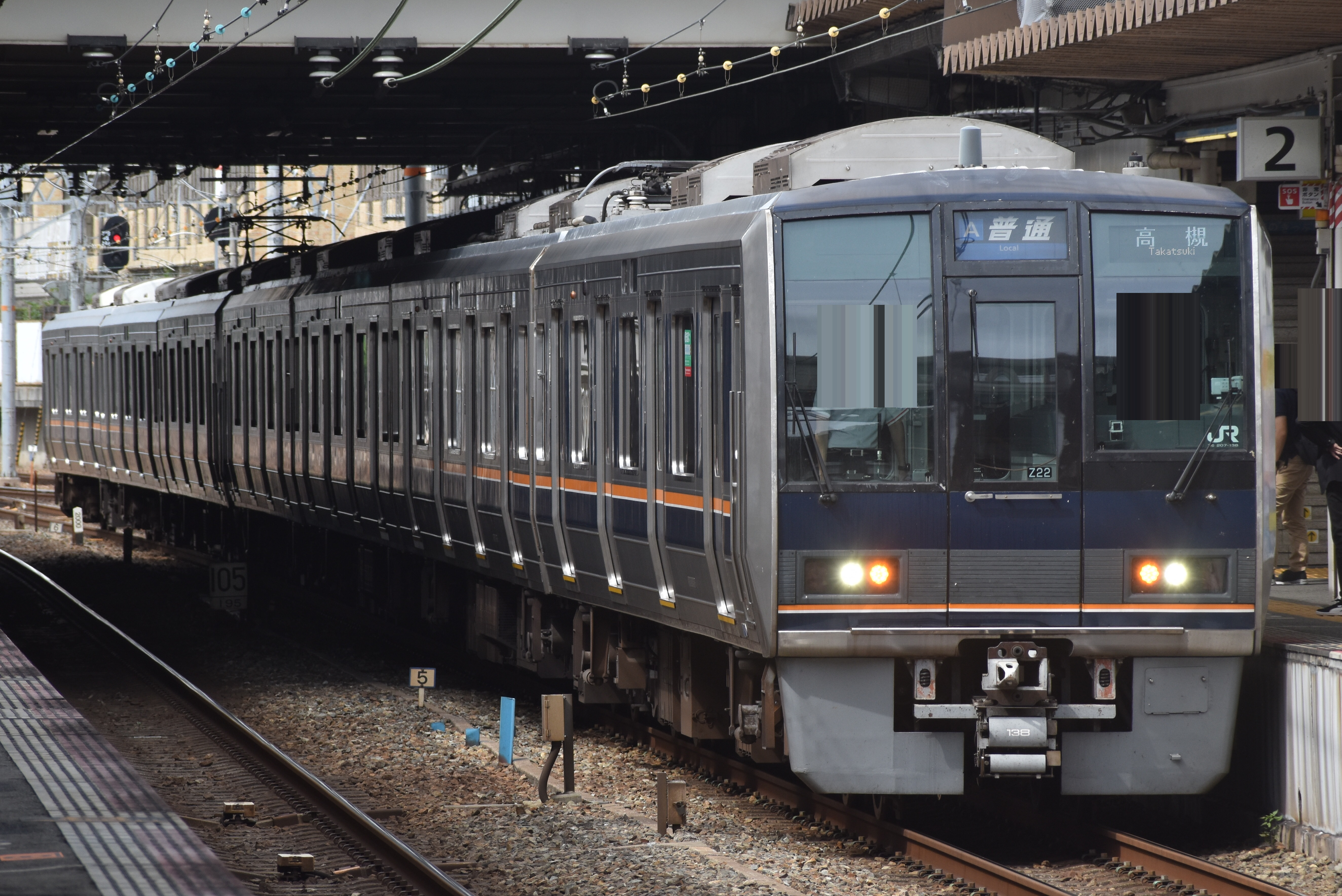
Z22, the first set to undergo refurbishment, in September 2021

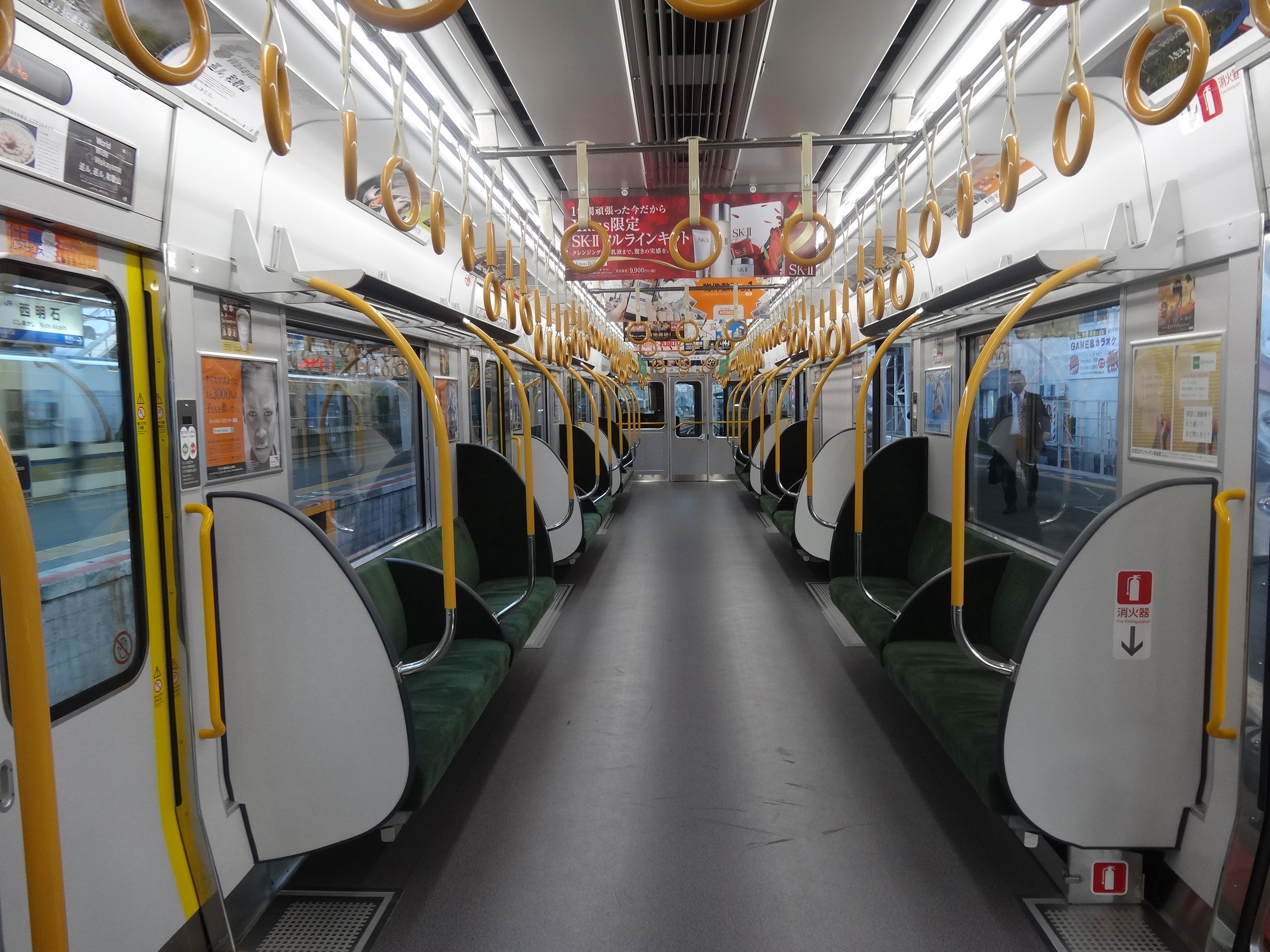
Refurbished interior

=== Withdrawal ===
On 6 April 2022, the 7-car prototype set (F1) was forwarded to Suita General Depot for scrapping.

== Variants ==
- 207-0 series (manufactured 1991–1994)
- 207-500/1500 series (converted from former 207-0 and 207-1000 series trains in 1996)
- 207-1000 series (manufactured 1994–1997)
- 207-2000 series (manufactured 2002–2003)

== Operations ==
- Tōkaidō Main Line and Sanyō Main Line Local Service (Biwako Line, JR Kyoto Line, JR Kobe Line): Yasu – Kakogawa
- Fukuchiyama Line (JR Takarazuka Line): Osaka – Sasayamaguchi
- JR Tōzai Line and Katamachi Line (Gakkentoshi Line): Amagasaki – Kyōbashi – Kizu
- Wadamisaki Line: Hyogo – Wadamisaki

=== Former operations ===
- Osaka Higashi Line
- Kosei Line: (Kyoto – Yamashina – Ōmi-Maiko)

== Formations ==
=== 207-0 series ===
==== 7-car prototype ====
The prototype set was formed as follows.

| Car No. | 1 | 2 | 3 | 4 | 5 | 6 | 7 |
|---|---|---|---|---|---|---|---|
| Designation | T'c | M1 | T | T | M2 | M1 | Tc |
| Numbering | KuHa 206-1 | MoHa 207-2 | SaHa 207-2 | SaHa 207-1 | MoHa 206-1 | MoHa 207-1 | KuHa 207-1 |
| Capacity (total/seated) | 150/50 | 163/58 | 163/58 | 163/58 | 163/58 | 163/58 | 150/50 |

==== 4-car sets ====
| Car No. | 4 | 5 | 6 | 7 |
|---|---|---|---|---|
| Designation | T'c | M2 | M1 | Tc |
| Numbering | KuHa 206 | MoHa 206 | MoHa 207 | KuHa 207 |
| Designation | T'c | M2 | M1 | Tc |
| Numbering | KuHa 206 | MoHa 207-1500 | MoHa 207-500 | KuHa 207 |

=== 207-1000, 207-2000 series ===
==== 4-car sets ====
| Car No. | 4 | 5 | 6 | 7 |
|---|---|---|---|---|
| Designation | T'c | M | T1 | Mc |
| Numbering | KuHa 206-1000 | MoHa 207-1000 | SaHa 207-1100 | KuMoHa 207-1000 |
| Designation | T'c | M | T | Mc |
| Numbering | KuHa 206-1000 | MoHa 207-1000 | SaHa 207-1000 | KuMoHa 207-1000 |
| Designation | T'c | M | T | Mc |
| Numbering | KuHa 206-2000 | MoHa 207-2000 | SaHa 207-2000 | KuMoHa 207-2000 |

==== 3-car sets ====
| Car No. | 1 | 2 | 3 |
|---|---|---|---|
| Designation | T'c | T | Mc |
| Numbering | KuHa 206-1000 | SaHa 207-1000 | KuMoHa 207-1000 |
| Designation | T'c | T | Mc |
| Numbering | KuHa 206-2000 | SaHa 207-2000 | KuMoHa 207-2000 |

== Interior ==
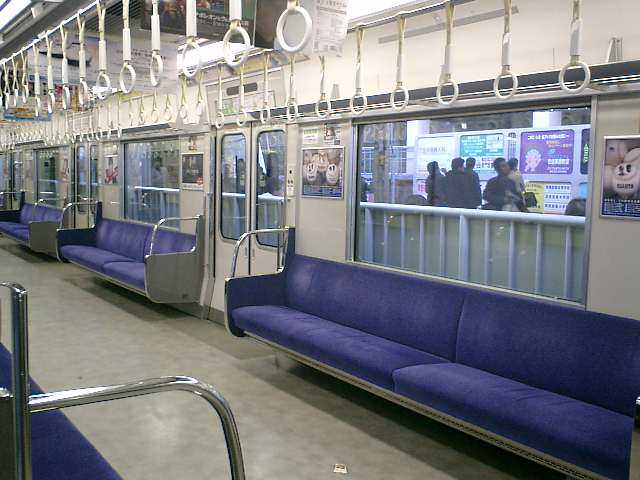
Original interior style, February 2006

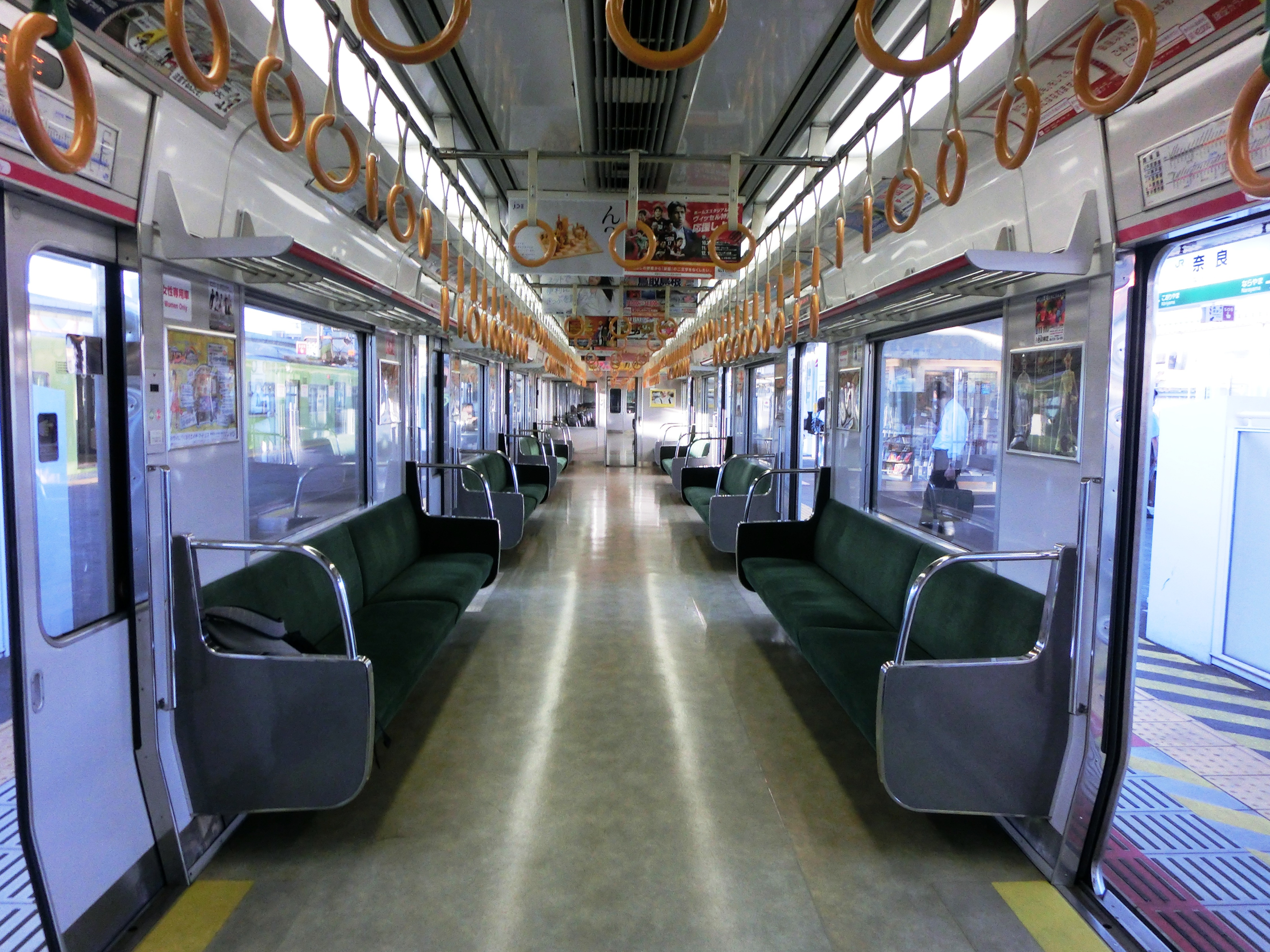
Interior following changes to seat covers and hanging straps

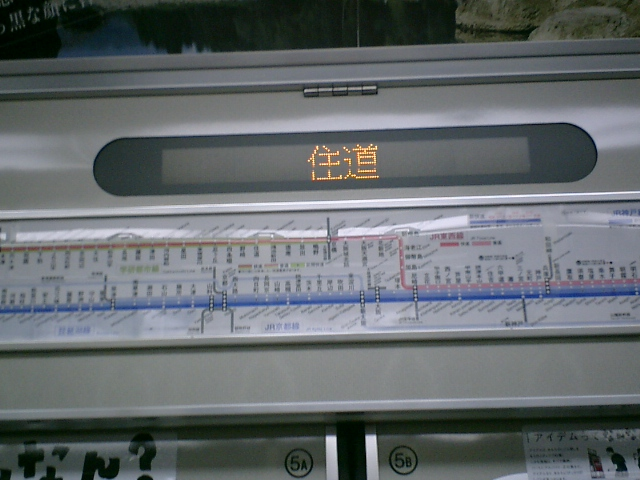
Original LED passenger information display above door

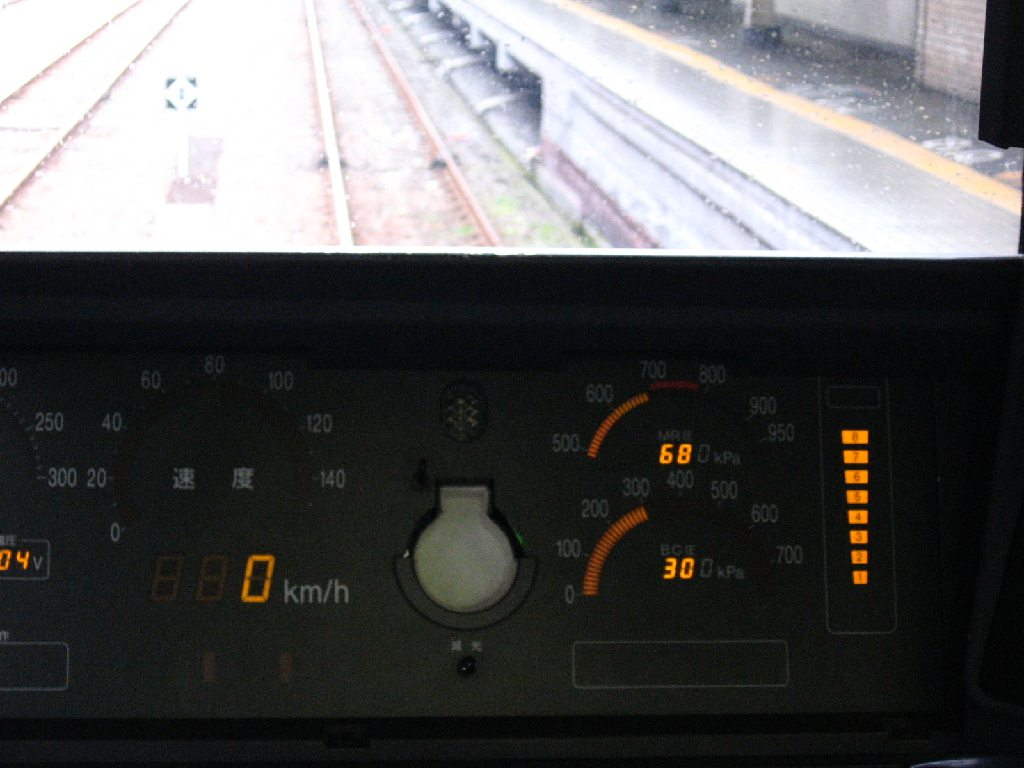
207-1000 series driver's cab

== See also ==
- Amagasaki derailment – 2005 fatal derailment which involved a 207 series train
