= Motomachi =

Motomachi (元町) is a Japanese place name.

- Motomachi, Hakodate, a district in Hakodate, Hokkaido Prefecture
- Motomachi, Kobe, a district in Kobe, Hyōgo Prefecture
- Motomachi, Nagasaki, a district in Nagasaki, Nagasaki Prefecture
- Motomachi, Yokohama, a district in Yokohama, Kanagawa Prefecture
- Toyota's Motomachi manufacturing plant in Toyota City, Aichi Prefecture

== See also ==
- Motomachi Station (disambiguation)
