= Chūō-Ichibamae Station =

Metro station in Kobe, Japan

Coordinates: 34.6659°N 135.1759°E

Chūō-Ichibamae Station 中央市場前駅
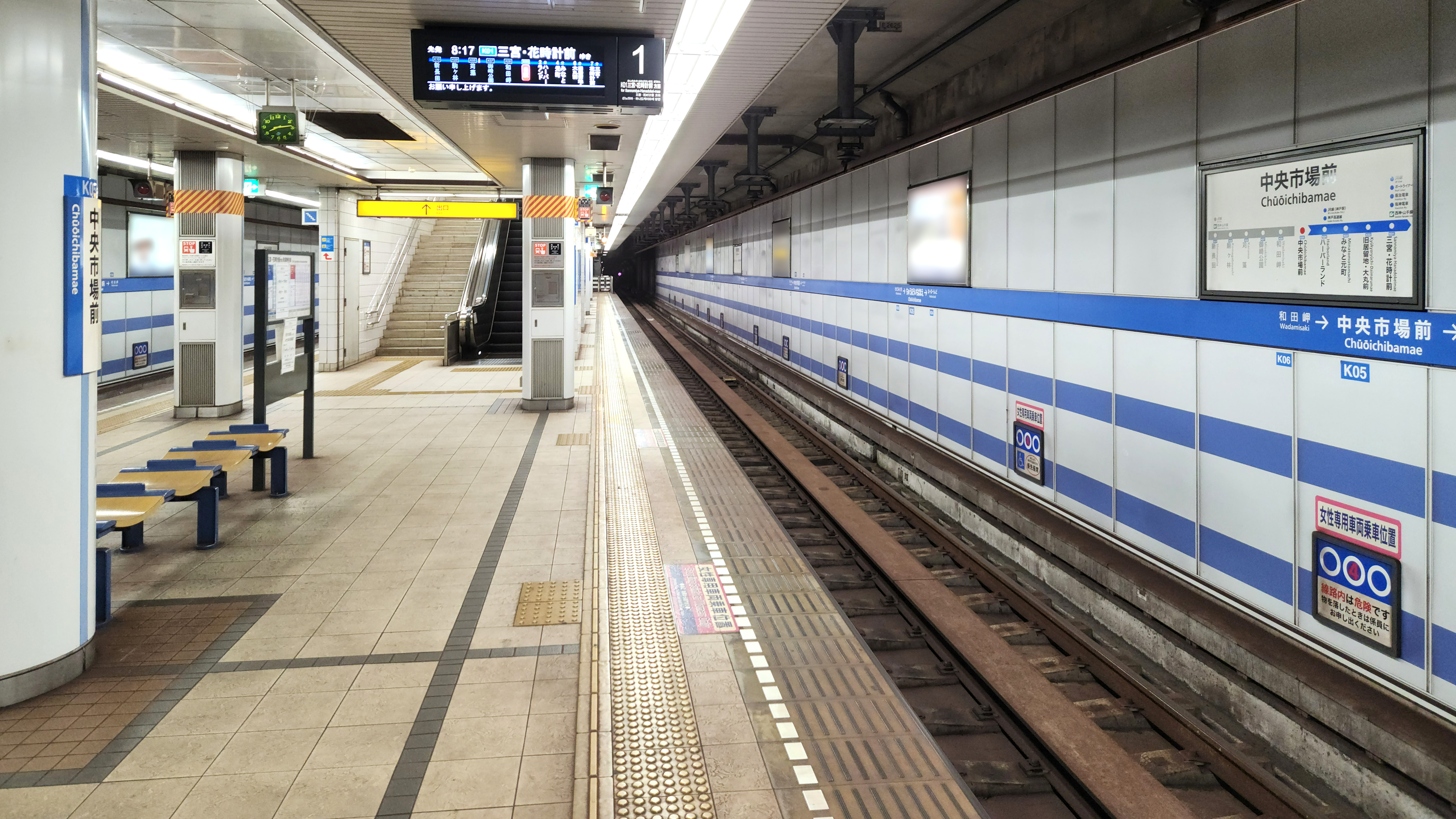
- The platform in October 2023

General information
- Location: Hyōgo ward Kobe, Hyōgo Prefecture; Japan
- System: Kobe Municipal Subway station
- Operator: Kobe Municipal Transportation Bureau
- Line: Kaigan Line
- Platforms: 1 island platform
- Tracks: 2

Construction
- Structure type: Underground

Other information
- Station code: K05

History
- Opened: 7 July 2001; 25 years ago

Services
| Preceding station | Kobe Municipal Subway | Following station |
|---|---|---|
| Wadamisaki towards Shin-Nagata | Kaigan Line | Harborland towards Sannomiya-Hanadokeimae |
Location
- Location within Kobe Location within Hyōgo Prefecture Location within Japan

Chūō-Ichibamae Station (中央市場前駅, Chūō-Ichibamae-eki; "Central Market Station") is a train station in Hyōgo-ku, Kobe, Hyōgo Prefecture, Japan. As reflected in its name, the station is located in front of (and beneath) the Kobe central markets (中央市場).

== Lines ==
- Kobe Municipal Subway
  - Kaigan Line Station K05

== Layout ==
The station has an island platform serving two tracks.

| 1 | ■ Kaigan Line | for Sannomiya-Hanadokeimae |
| 2 | ■ Kaigan Line | for Shin-Nagata |

== Gallery ==
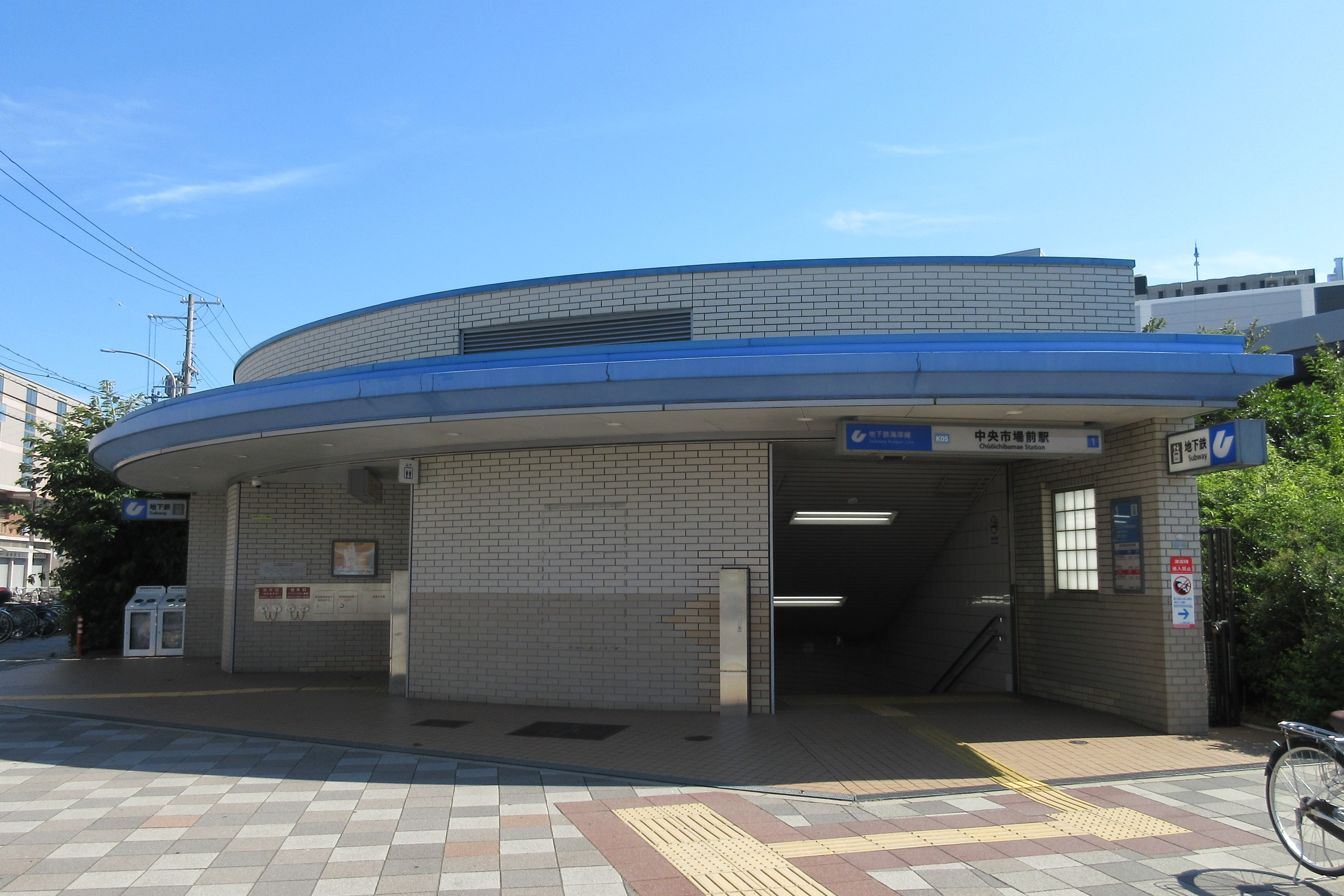
Station entrance

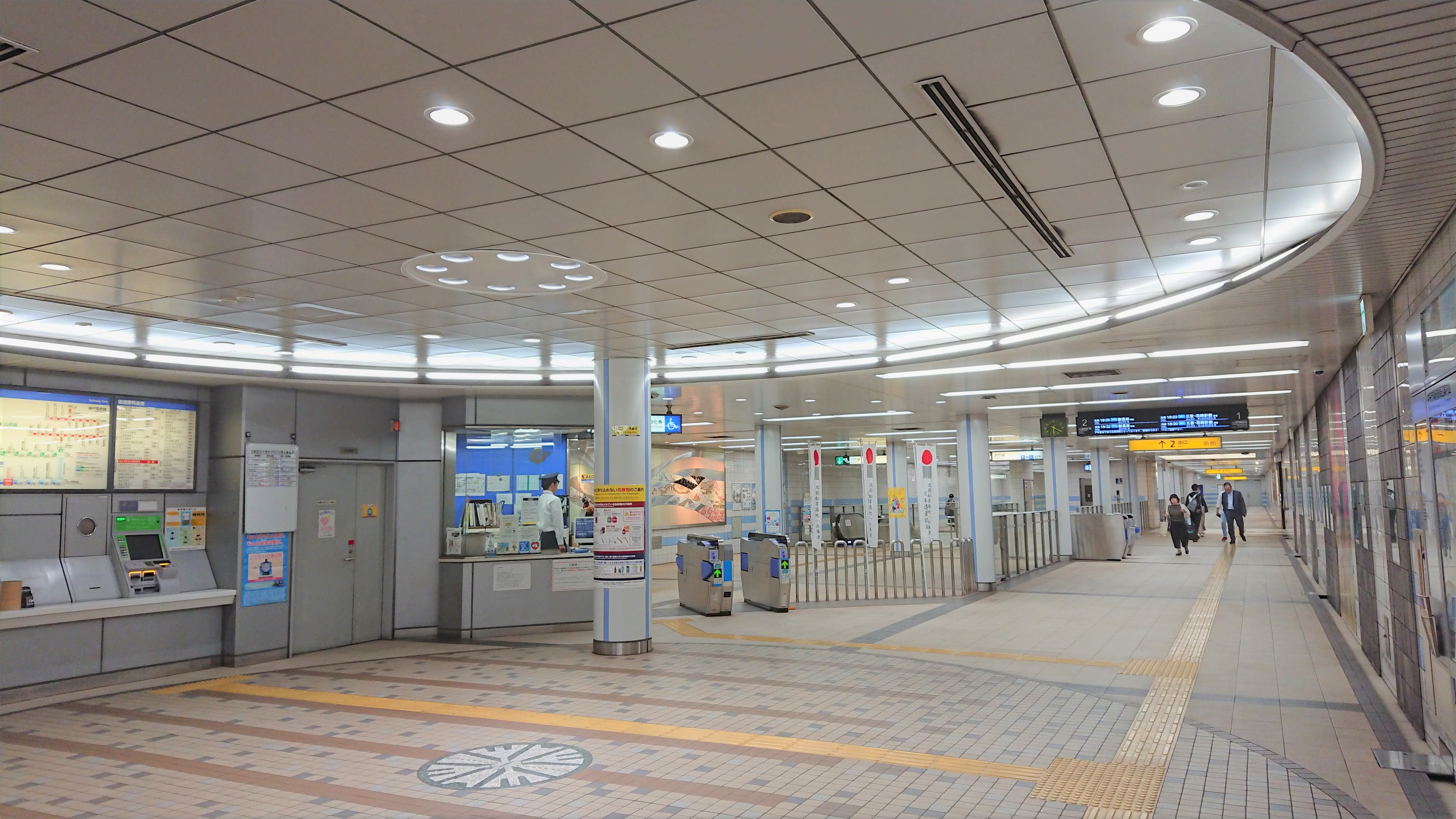
Fare gates

== History ==
The station opened on 7 July 2001.
