= JGR Class 3380 =

Class of 4 Japanese compound 2-6-2T locomotives

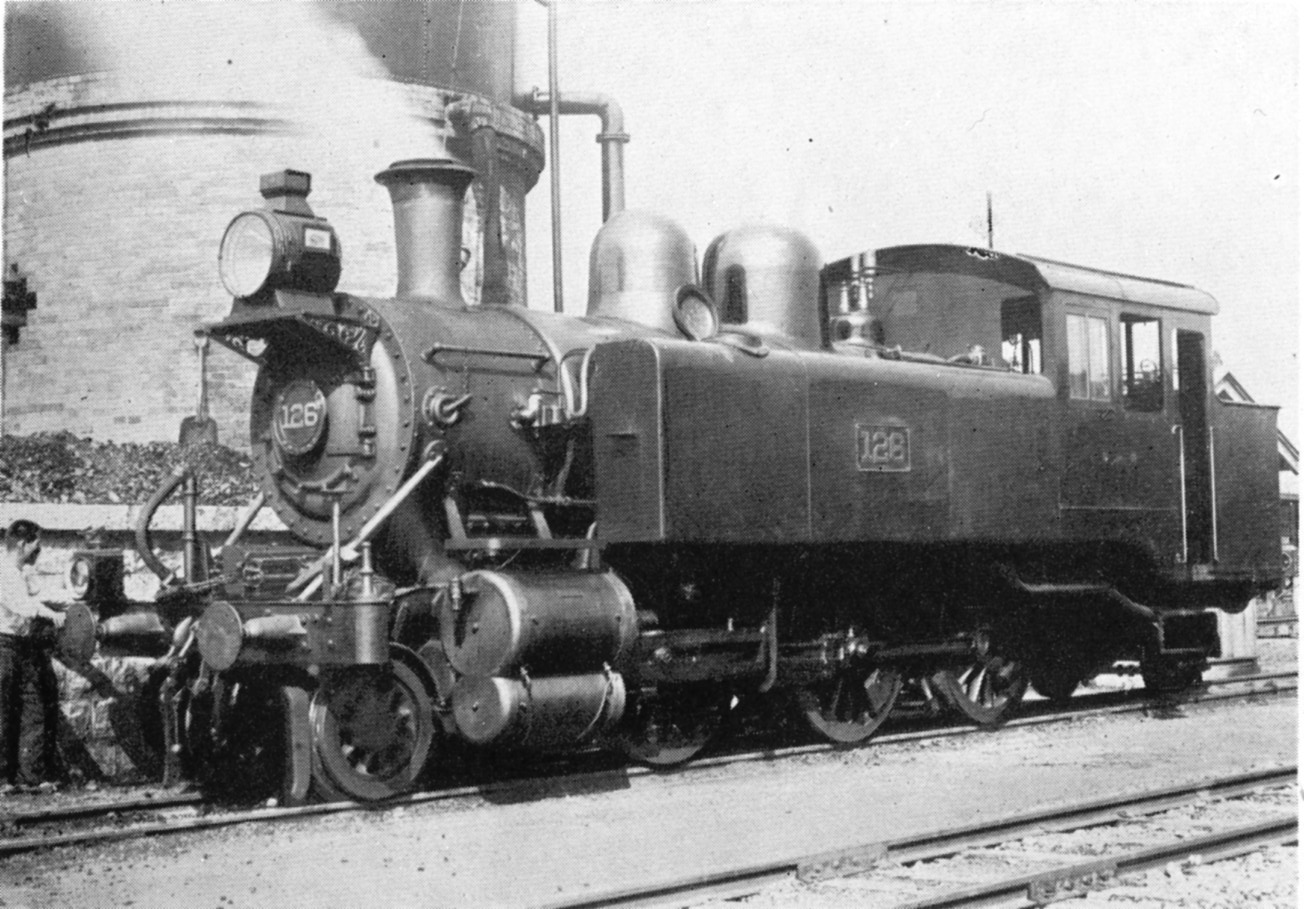
- Class 3380 locomotive in service on the San'yō Railway as no. 126, prior to nationalization
Type and origin
- Power type: Steam
- Builder: Sanyō Railway
- Build date: 1906
- Total produced: 4
Specifications
- Configuration
  - Whyte: 2-6-2T
- Gauge: 1,067 mm (3 ft 6 in)
- Driver dia.: 1,270 mm (4 ft 2 in)
- Length: 10.846 m (35 ft 7.0 in)
- Loco weight: 39.35 t
- Fuel capacity: 1.94 t
- Water cap.: 6.71 m^{3} (1,773 US gal)
- Firebox
  - Grate area: 1.58 m^{2} (17 sq ft)
- Boiler pressure: 12.7 kg/cm^{2} (181 lbf/in^{2})
- Heating surface: 91.1 m^{2} (981 sq ft)
- Cylinders: four (Vauclain compound)
- High-pressure cylinder: 29.2 cm × 55.9 cm (11 in × 22 in)
- Low-pressure cylinder: 48.3 cm × 55.9 cm (19 in × 22 in)
- Valve gear: Stephenson
Performance figures
- Tractive effort: 8,100kg (single), 5,930kg (double)
Career
- Retired: 1925
- Disposition: All scrapped

The JGR Class 3380 consisted of four Vauclain compound 2-6-2T wheel arrangement steam locomotives of the Japanese Government Railways. They were built by the San'yō Railway as numbers 125-128 and inherited by the JGR under nationalization in 1907. They continued to serve on the San'yō Main Line until 1919, when they were sent to Hokkaido. All four were scrapped in 1925.

== Accidents ==
No. 3382 was involved in an accident in Kobe on 28 November 1918 when it pushed two other locomotives into the harbor due to incorrectly set brakes.

== See also ==
- Japan Railways locomotive numbering and classification
