= Motomachi Station =

Motomachi Station (元町駅) can be any of several train stations in Japan:

- Motomachi Station (Hyogo) on the JR West Tokaido Line (JR Kobe Line), the Hanshin Electric Railway Main Line and the Kobe Rapid Railway Tozai Line in Chuo-ku, Kobe.
- Motomachi Station (Hokkaido) on the Sapporo Subway Toho Line in Higashi-ku, Sapporo.
- Minato Motomachi Station (みなと元町駅) on the Kobe Municipal Subway Kaigan Line in Chuo-ku, Kobe.
- Motomachi-Chukagai Station (元町・中華街駅) on the Minatomirai Line in Naka-ku, Yokohama.
