= San'yō Railway =

Former private railway company in Japan

Sanyō Railway

Overview
- Headquarters: Kobe
- Locale: Japan
- Dates of operation: 1888–1906
- Successor: JGR

Technical
- Track gauge: 1,067 mm (3 ft 6 in)
- Length: 667.7 km (414.9 mi) (1906)

The Sanyō Railway (山陽鉄道, San'yō-tetsudō) was established in 1887 and served as a major railroad company during the Meiji period in Japan. The railroad was headquartered in Kobe, and Nakamigawa Hikojirō served as head of the railroad.

== Rail lines ==
The first rail line opened in 1888. By 1894, the Sanyō Railway had been extended west, along the coast of the Seto Inland Sea, from Kobe to Hiroshima. The railroad was later extended to Shimonoseki. The Sanyō Main Line connected with the Tōkaidō Main Line in Kobe, and the Kyūshū Railway at Moji. The railway gained a reputation for being one of the most progressive and innovative in Japan in its day, introducing the first sleeping cars, dining cars, and electric lighting on its trains. In 1904, the 530 km (330 mile) trip from Kobe to Shimonoseki took 11 hours. An express train from Kobe to Hiroshima took 8 1/2 hours, travelling 304 km (189 miles).

Railway operation of Sanyō Railway as of November 30, 1906
Endpoints	Length (km)	Length (miles)	Line names (designated after nationalization)	Notes
Kōbe – Shimonoseki	530.0	329.3	Sanyō Main Line	
Himeji – Shikama	5.6	3.5	Bantan Line	
Himeji – Wadayama	65.8	40.9	Bantan Line	
Asa – Ōmine	19.6	12.2	Mine Line	
Hyōgo – Wadamisaki	2.9	1.8	Sanyō Main Line (Wadamisaki Line)	
Takamatsu – Kotohira	43.8	27.2	Yosan Line	
Subtotal	676.7	414.9		
Kaitaichi – Kure	20.0	12.4	Kure Line	Leased from Government Railways
Hiroshima – Ujina	6.0	3.7	Ujina Line	Leased from Army
Total	693.7	414.9		

== Steamship ==
Sanyō also operated steamship service, from Shimonoseki to Busan in Korea. Sanyō Railway also operated a ferry from Miyajimaguchi Station, which opened on September 25, 1897, to Itsukushima (Miyajima).

== Nationalization ==
The railroad was nationalized in 1906, under the Railway Nationalization Act, becoming the San'yō Main Line.
