= Kyūkyoryūchi-Daimarumae Station =

Metro station in Kobe, Japan

Coordinates: 34.6891°N 135.1900°E

Kyūkyoryūchi-Daimarumae Station 旧居留地・大丸前駅
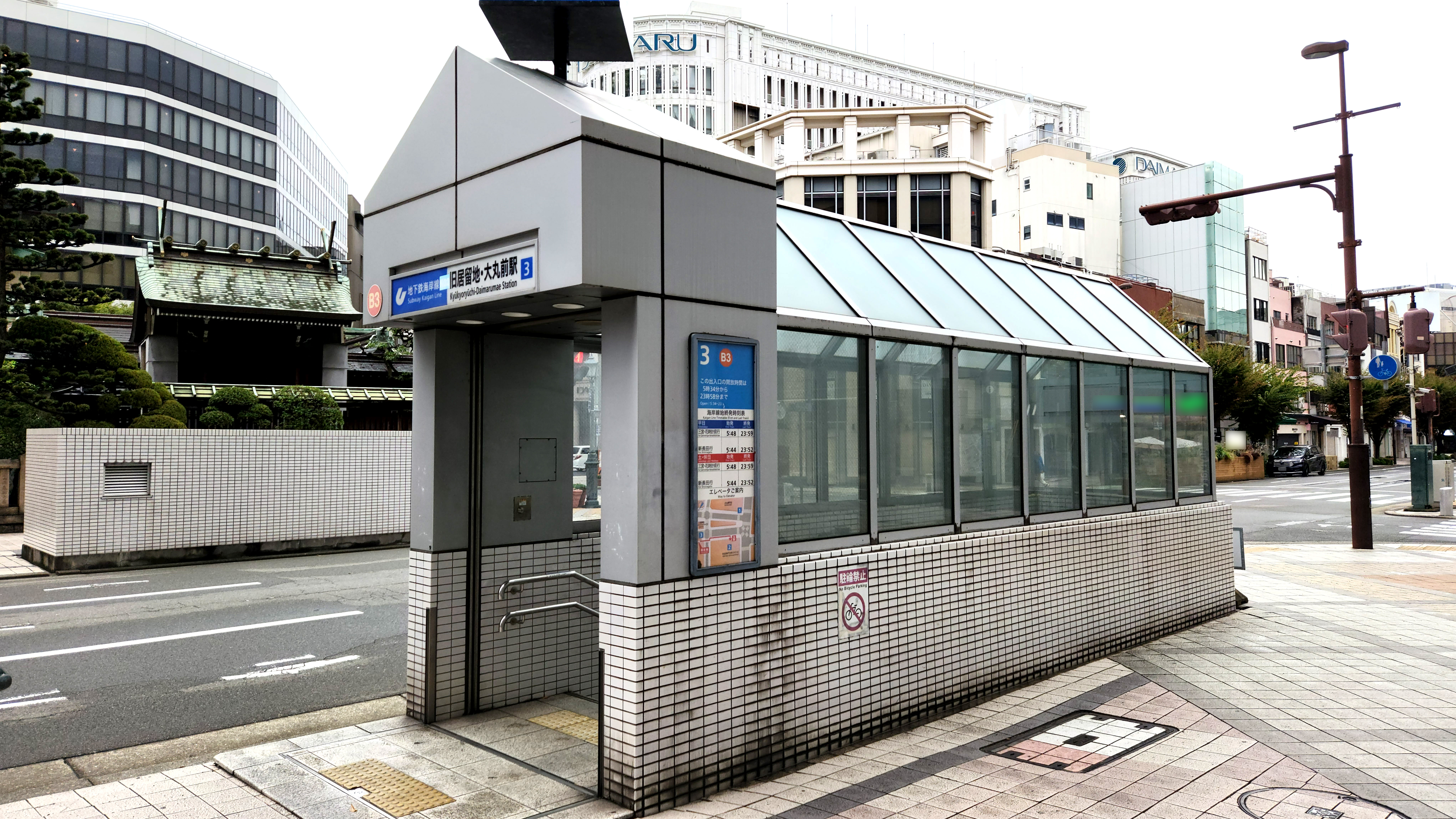
- The no.3 entrance to the station in October 2023

General information
- Location: Sannomiya-cho; Chūō-ku, Kobe-shi, Hyōgo Prefecture; Japan
- System: Kobe Municipal Subway station
- Operator: Kobe Municipal Transportation Bureau
- Line: Kaigan Line
- Platforms: 1 island platform
- Tracks: 2

Construction
- Structure type: Underground

Other information
- Station code: K02

History
- Opened: 7 July 2001; 25 years ago

Services
| Preceding station | Kobe Municipal Subway | Following station |
|---|---|---|
| Minato Motomachi towards Shin-Nagata | Kaigan Line | Sannomiya-Hanadokeimae Terminus |
Location
- Location within Kobe Location within Hyōgo Prefecture Location within Japan

Kyūkyoryūchi-Daimarumae Station (旧居留地・大丸前駅, Kyūkyoryūchi-Daimarumae-eki) is a train station in Chūō-ku, Kobe, Hyōgo Prefecture, Japan. The station name literally means "in front of the Former Foreign Settlement and Daimaru".

== Lines ==
- Kobe Municipal Subway

- Kaigan Line Station K02

== Layout ==
The station has an island platform which serves two tracks.

| 1 | ■ Kaigan Line | for Sannomiya-Hanadokeimae |
| 2 | ■ Kaigan Line | for Shin-Nagata |

== History ==
The station opened on 7 July 2001.
