= Harborland Station =

Metro station in Kobe, Japan

Harborland Station ハーバーランド駅
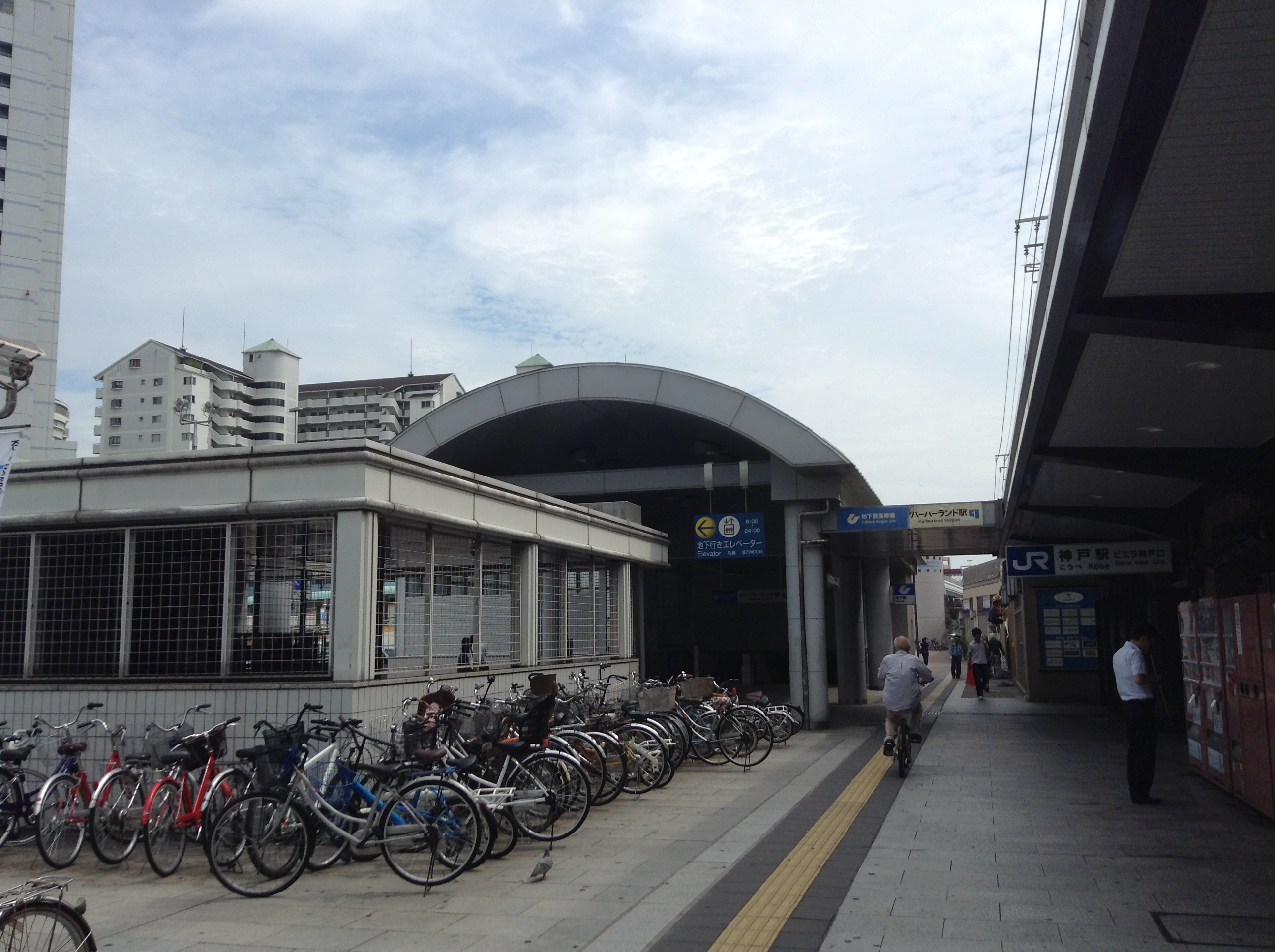
- Station entrance

General information
- Location: Higashi-Kawasakicho Itchome, Chuo, Kobe, Hyōgo （神戸市中央区東川崎町一丁目） Japan
- Coordinates: 34°40′42.73″N 135°10′43.36″E
- Operator: Kobe Municipal Transportation Bureau
- Line: Kaigan Line
- Platforms: 1 island platform
- Tracks: 2
- Connections: Sanyo Main Line at Kōbe; Hanshin Main Line and Hankyu Kobe Line at Kosoku Kobe

Construction
- Structure type: Underground

Other information
- Station code: K04

History
- Opened: 7 June 2001; 25 years ago

Services
Preceding station	Kobe Municipal Subway	Following station
Chūō-Ichibamae towards Shin-Nagata	Kaigan Line	Minato Motomachi towards Sannomiya-Hanadokeimae
Location
- Location within Kobe Location within Hyōgo Prefecture Location within Japan

Harborland Station (ハーバーランド駅, Hābārando-eki) is a train station on the Kobe Municipal Subway Kaigan Line in Chūō-ku, Kobe, Hyōgo Prefecture, Japan.

== Layout ==
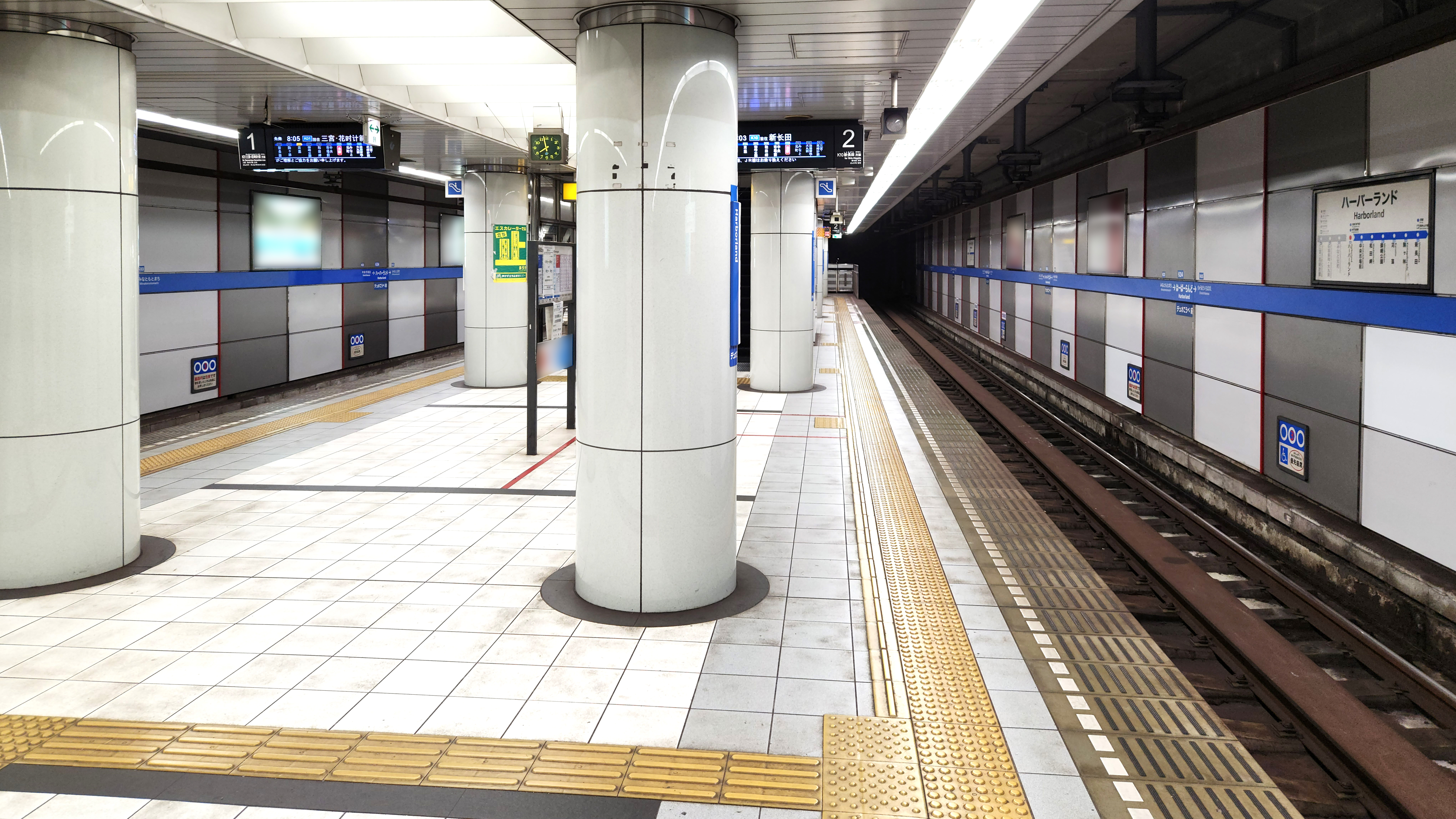
Station platform in October 2023

An island platform serving two tracks is located on the 2nd basement, one level lower than the ticket gates.

1	■ Kaigan Line	for Sannomiya-Hanadokeimae
2	■ Kaigan Line	for Shin-Nagata

== Surroundings ==
Underground city
- Duo Kobe
- Metro Kobe
Sea side
- Harborland
  - Harbor Walk
  - Mosaic
  - Umie
- Kobe Crystal Tower (Kawasaki Heavy Industries, Ltd.)
Mountain side
- Minatogawa Shrine
- Kobe Bunka Hall
- Kobe Municipal Central Library
- Kobe District Court
- Kobe University Hospital

== History ==
The station was opened on 7 July 2001.
