= Minato Motomachi Station =

Metro station in Kobe, Japan

Coordinates: 34.6856°N 135.1842°E

Minato Motomachi Station みなと元町駅
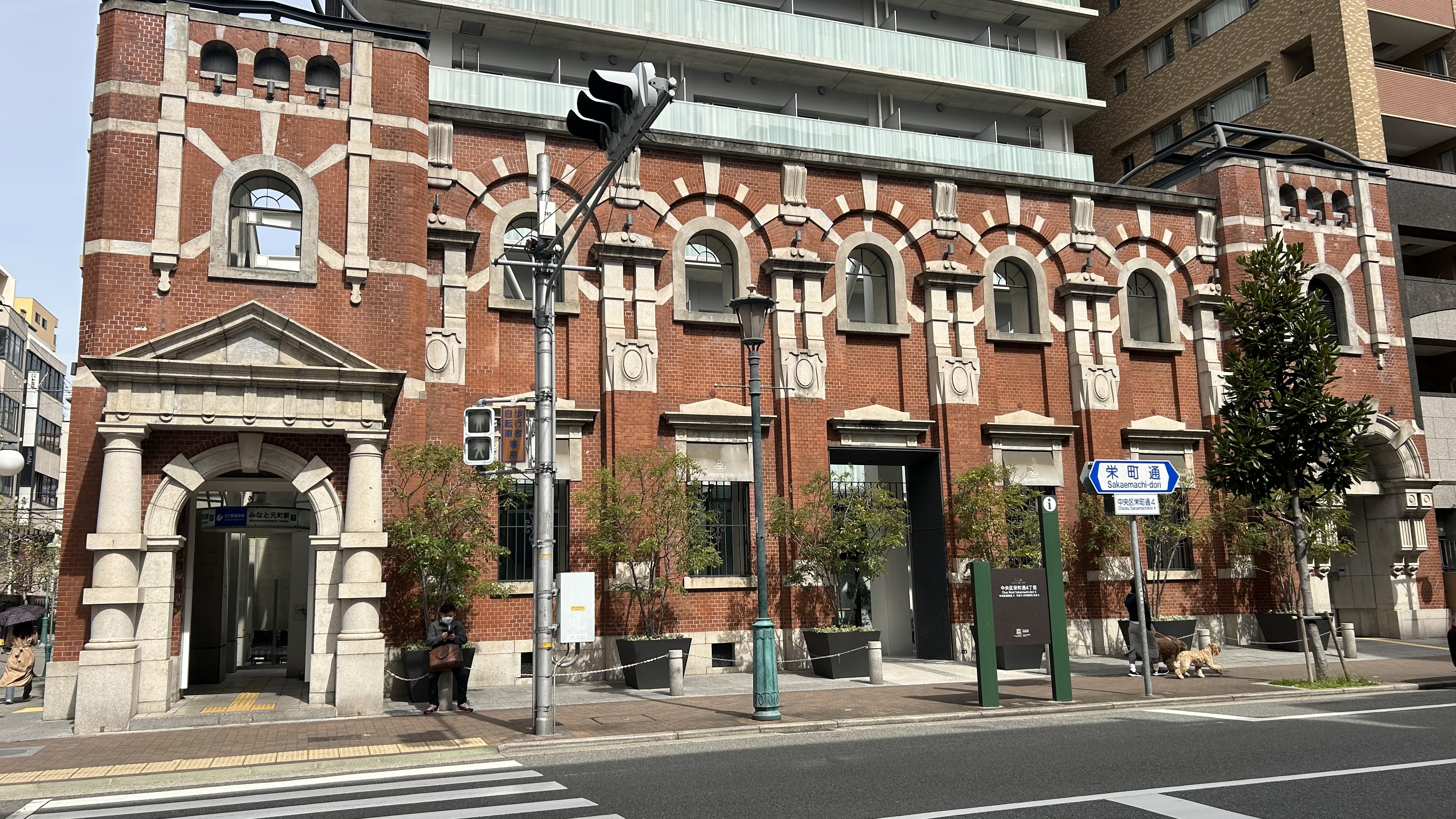
- Minato Motomachi station

General information
- Location: Sakaemachi -dori Chūō-ku, Kobe, Hyōgo Prefecture; Japan
- System: Kobe Municipal Subway station
- Operator: Kobe Municipal Transportation Bureau
- Line: Kaigan Line
- Platforms: 1 island platform
- Tracks: 2

Construction
- Structure type: Underground

Other information
- Station code: K03

History
- Opened: 7 June 2001; 25 years ago

Services
Preceding station	Kobe Municipal Subway	Following station
Harborland towards Shin-Nagata	Kaigan Line	Kyukyoryuchi-Daimarumae towards Sannomiya-Hanadokeimae
Location
- Location within Kobe Location within Hyōgo Prefecture Location within Japan

Minato Motomachi Station (みなと元町駅, Minato Motomachi-eki) is a train station in Chūō-ku, Kobe, Hyōgo Prefecture, Japan。

== Lines ==
- Kobe Municipal Subway

- Kaigan Line Station K03

== Layout ==
The station has an island platform that serves two tracks.

1	■ Kaigan Line	for Sannomiya-Hanadokeimae
2	■ Kaigan Line	for Shin-Nagata

== Gallery ==
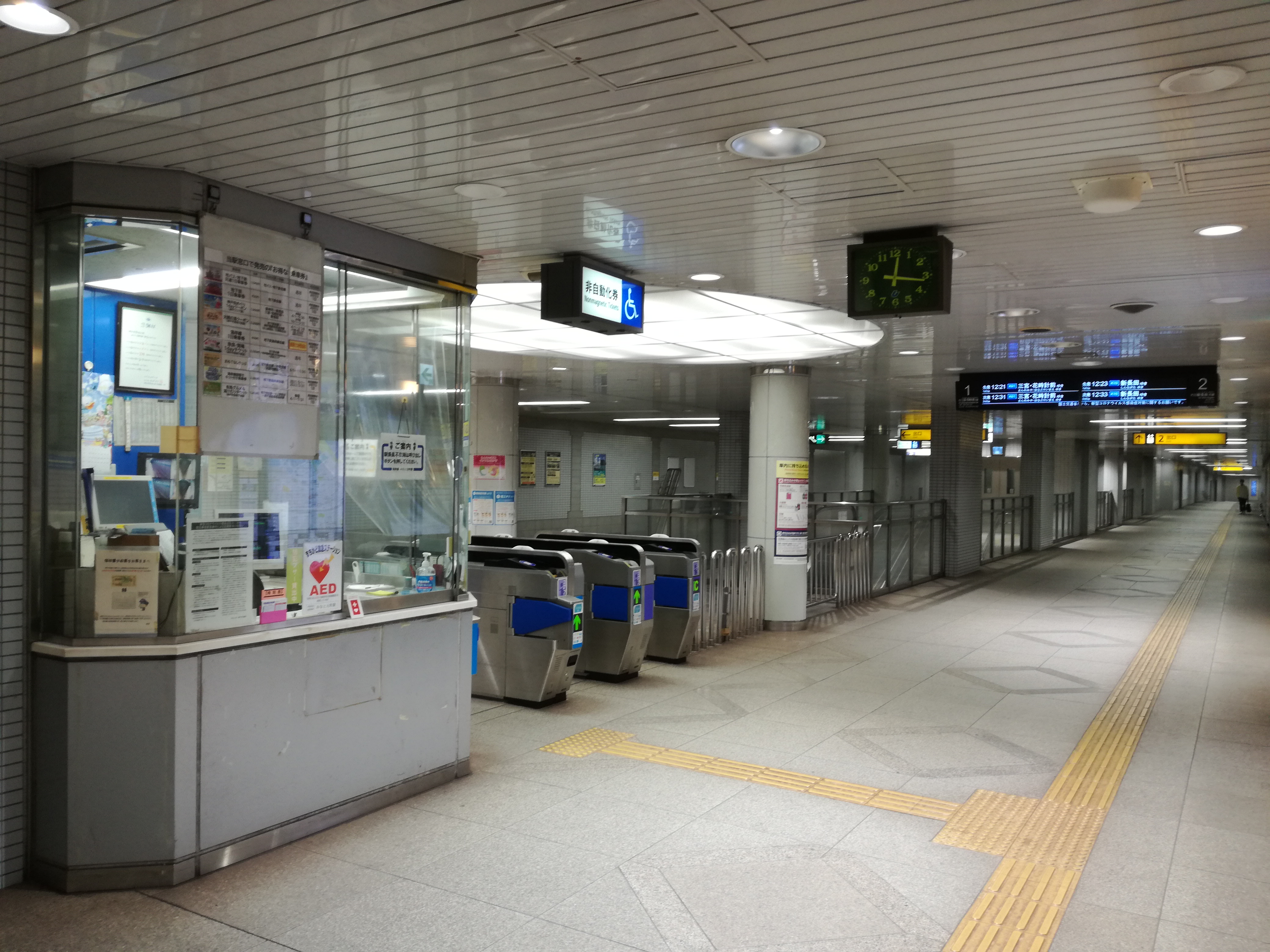
Fare gates

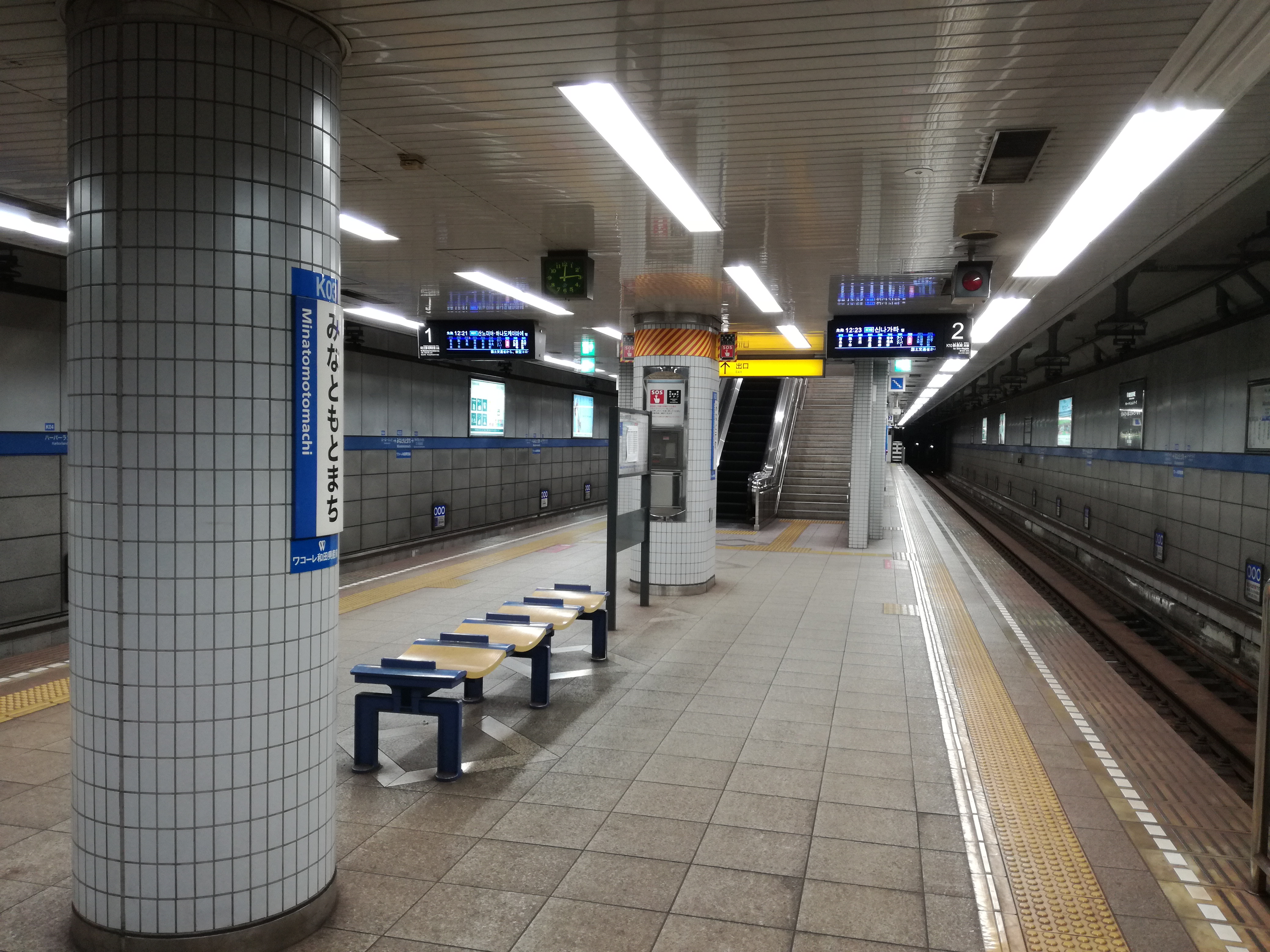
Platforms

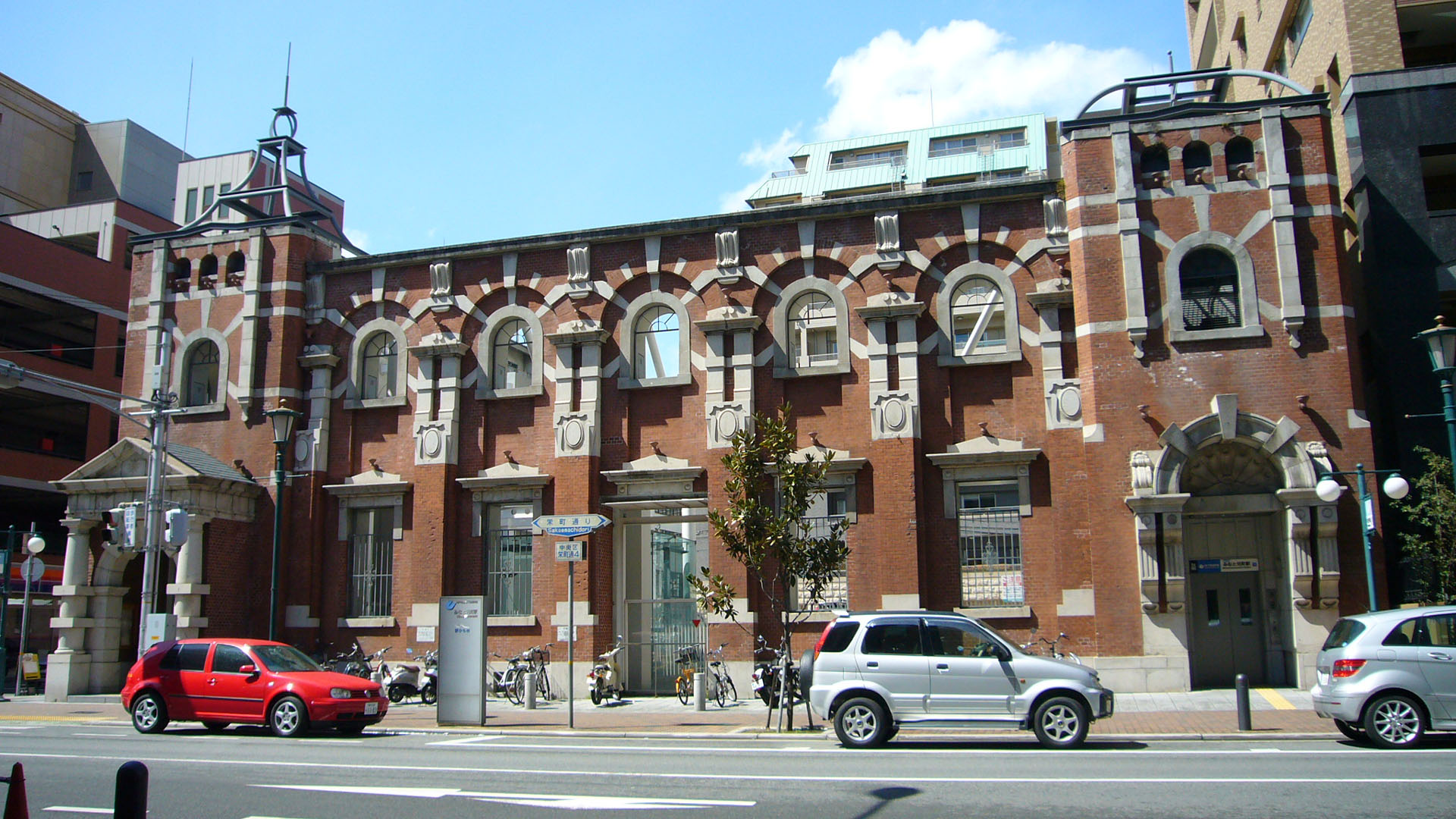

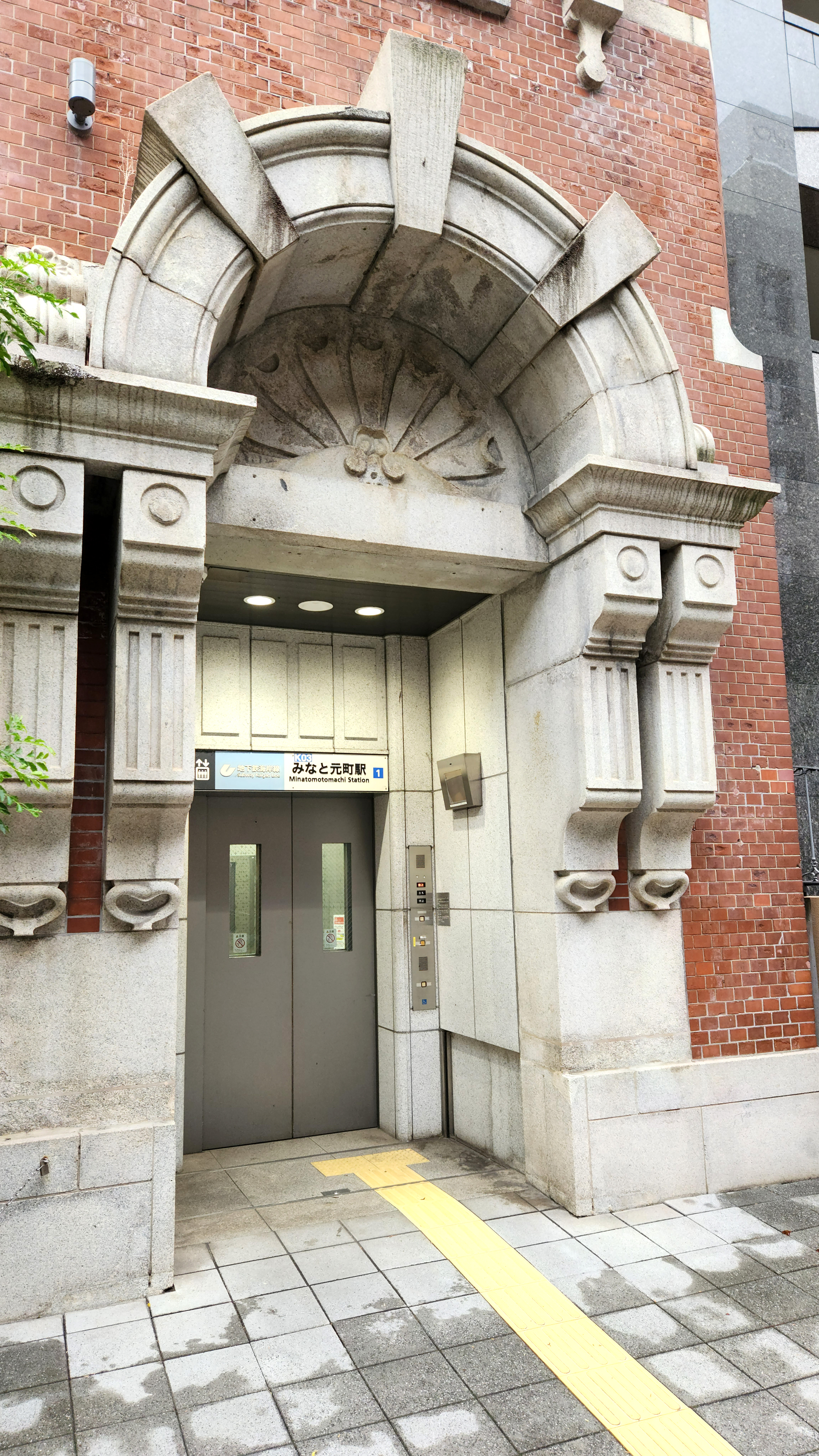

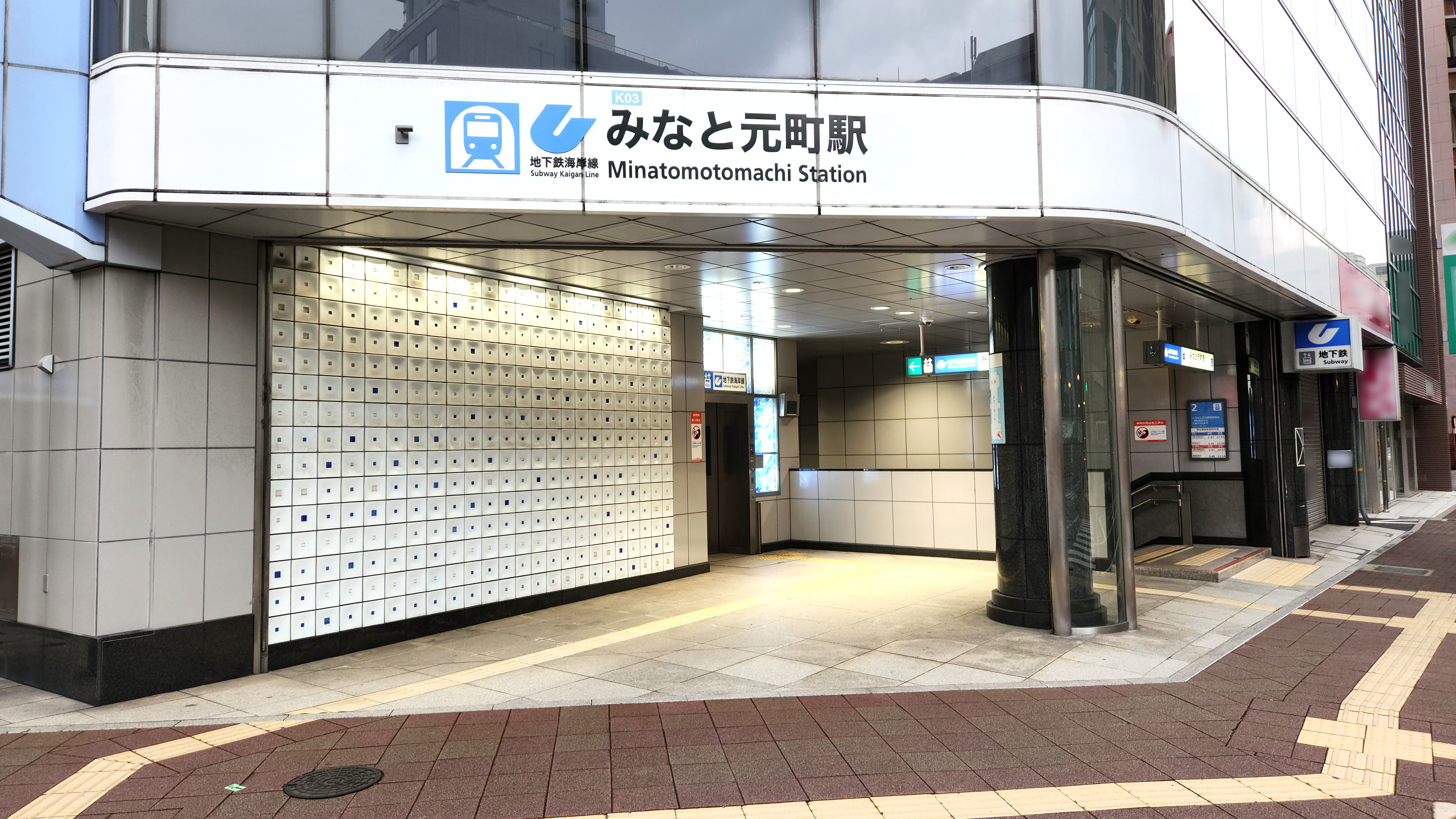
Exit 2 of the Minato Motomachi Station

== History ==
The station opened on 7 July 2001.
