= Wadamisaki Line =

Railway spur line in Japan

Coordinates: 34°39′35.2″N 135°10′5.6″E

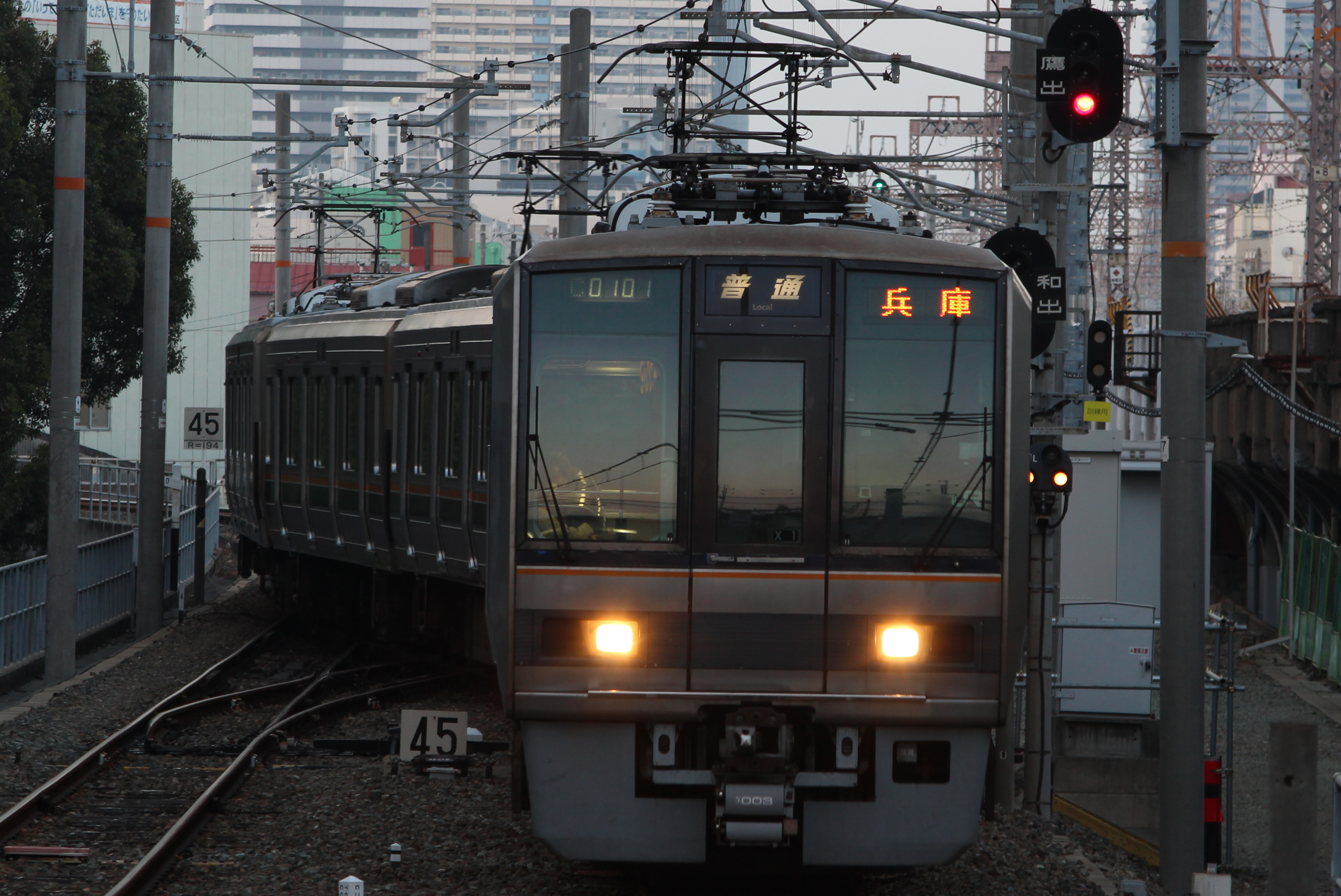
- A Wadamisaki Line 207 series train in January 2024

Overview
- Status: In operation
- Owner: JR West
- Locale: Hyōgo
- Termini: Hyōgo; Wadamisaki
- Stations: 2

Service
- Type: Commuter rail
- Rolling stock: 207 series

History
- Opened: 8 July 1890; 135 years ago

Technical
- Line length: 2.7 km (1.7 mi)
- Number of tracks: Entirely single-tracked
- Track gauge: 1,067 mm (3 ft 6 in)
- Electrification: 1,500 V DC overhead catenary

The Wadamisaki Line (和田岬線, Wadamisaki-sen) is a spur line of the San'yō Main Line, operated by West Japan Railway Company (JR West). The line branches off from the San'yō Main Line from Hyōgo, connecting to Wadamisaki.

The line was opened on 8 July 1890 as a freight line for the transportation of construction material for the section between Hyōgo and Himeji. Passenger services commenced in 1911. In 2011, the line was brought up for closure by the city of Kobe due to the line blocking city developments and transportations by ships. In 2024, JR West commented that it has no intentions to close the line without strong consensus from locals.

The branch line consists of only two stations, serving commuters to the factories of Mitsubishi Heavy Industries and the Mitsubishi Electric. Trains manufactured in the Kawasaki Railcar Manufacturing's Hyogo factory pass the line to be delivered elsewhere.

== History ==
The line was opened on 8 July 1890 by the San'yō Railway as a freight line to transport construction material for the railway between Hyōgo Station and Himeji Station. The line began passenger services in 1911. The line formerly had the Kanebōmae Station in between the two existing ones, located 1.6 km (0.99 mi) away from Hyōgo Station. This station opened in 1912, but had its operations suspended in 1945, before formally being closed in 1962. The line was electrified in 2001.

Although the line is estimated to be profitable according to JR West, the line has been requested to be closed and decommissioned by the city of Kobe, as the line blocks the development of the city and ship transportations. First talks were held between the city and JR west in 2011. The line has been blamed for the deficit Kaigan Line's poor performance, which opened in 2001, while the Wadamisaki Line experienced passenger loss due to the line's construction. As of 2024, JR West has no intention to close the line without consensus by the local community.

There was a link to the Mitsubishi Heavy Industries shipbuilding facility at Kobe Shipyard just after Wadamisaki Station.

== Operation ==
The 2.7-kilometre (1.7 mi) line has only two stops, and only operates during morning and evening, and mainly serves commuters to the Mitsubishi Heavy Industries and Mitsubishi Electric factories in the Wadamisaki industrial area of Kobe. The Wadamisaki Station lacks ticket gates, as fares are handled in the Hyōgo Station only.

Although the line is officially part of the Sanyo Main Line, there is no regular through service through the branch and the main line, and trains depart from a separate platform at Hyogo. Because the line has no intermediate station and Wadamisaki Station is unstaffed, all fare collection is conducted at Hyogo. The line makes just two daily roundtrips on weekends. The Noevir Stadium, the home stadium of J1 League football club Vissel Kobe is located along the line, although the team does not encourage using the line to visit the stadium due to the lack of daytime service.

The line is also connected to Kawasaki Railcar Manufacturing's Hyogo factory, which has produced more than 90,000 train cars since its inception. Trains manufactured in the factory are transported to their destinations via the Wadamisaki Line and the San'yo Main Line. The line formerly handled freight-only trains since its commencement of operation, with trains from the Hyogo Rinko Line also entering the line from 1911 to until its closure in 1984.

== Infrastructure ==
The Wada swing bridge, the oldest remaining swing bridge in Japan is in the line since the Hyogo canal's construction in 1899. This bridge has been fixed in place and no longer can rotate.

From the line's electrification in 2001, the 103 series were used in the line until 2023. Since then, the 207 series has replaced the 103 series completely. Prior to the introduction of the 103 series, retro passenger cars were used with diesel locomotives coupled on both sides.

=== Stations ===
Station		Distance	Connections	Location
Hyogo	兵庫	0.0 km	Sanyo Main Line (JR Kobe Line) (JR-A64)	Hyogo-ku, Kobe
Wadamisaki	和田岬	2.7 km	Kobe Municipal Subway Kaigan Line (K06)	Hyogo-ku, Kobe
