= Hyōgo Station =

Railway station in Kobe, Japan

A 64 Hyōgo Station 兵庫駅
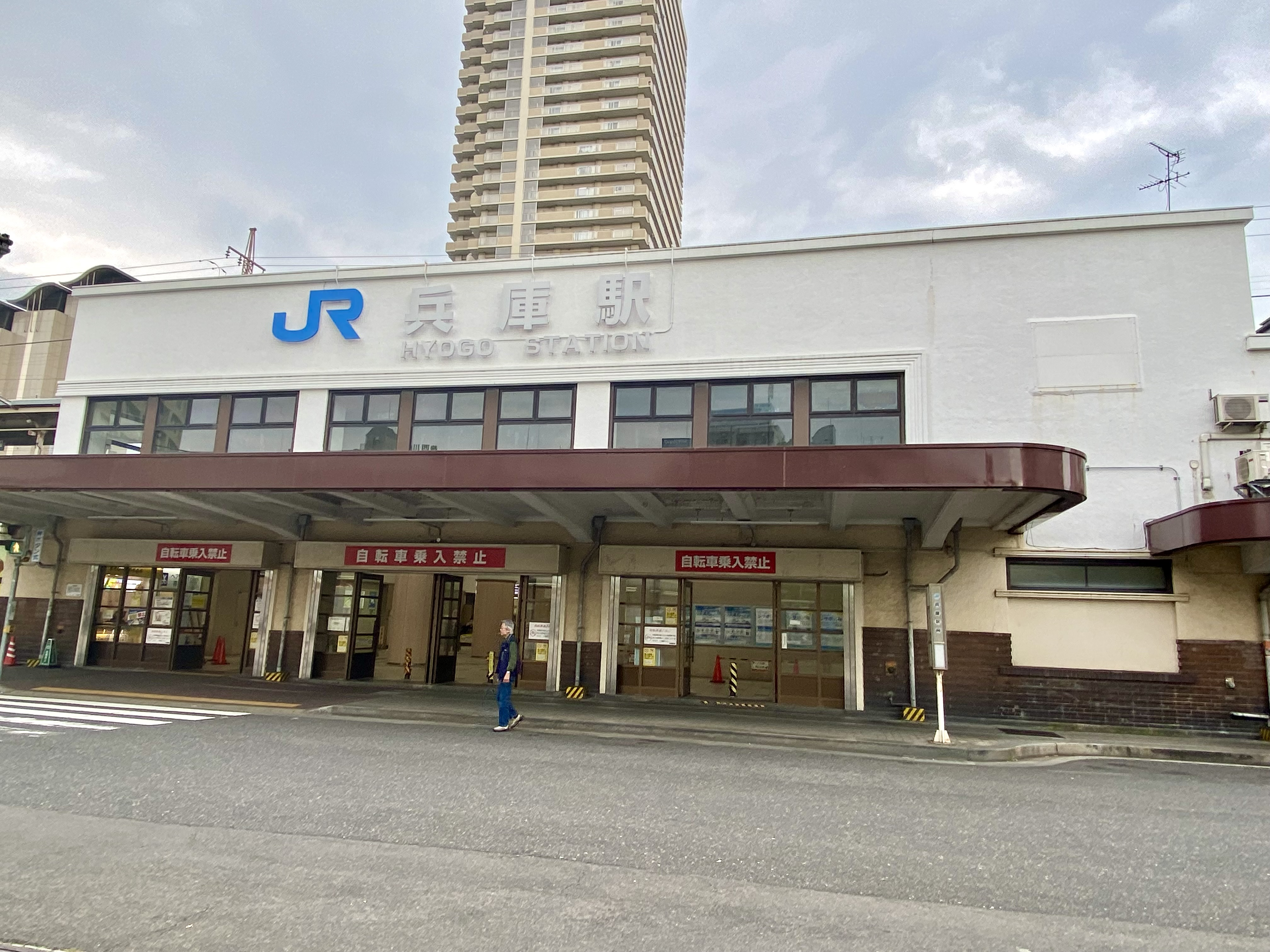
- The station building in 2022

General information
- Location: Ekiminamidori 5-chome 3-7, Hyōgo-ku, Kobe, Hyōgo Prefecture, Japan
- Coordinates: 34.6684°N 135.1647°E
- Operated by: JR West
- Platforms: 3
- Tracks: 5

History
- Opened: 1 November 1888
- Rebuilt: 1930
Location

Hyōgo Station (兵庫駅, Hyōgo-eki) is a railway station in Hyōgo-ku, Kobe, Hyōgo Prefecture, Japan, operated by the West Japan Railway Company (JR West). The station is served by the part of the San'yō Main Line nicknamed the JR Kōbe Line, and also is the terminus for the branch line nicknamed the Wadamisaki Line.

== History ==
Station numbering was introduced to the Kobe Line in March 2018 with Hyōgo being assigned station number JR-A64.

== Station layout ==
1F	Street Level	Exit/Entrance, ticket gates, station agent
M2F
M2F	Platform, ticket gates for Wadamisaki Line
M2F	Unnumbered platform	← Wadamisaki Line towards Wadamisaki ←
2F
2F	Platform 1	→ San'yo Main Line towards Sannomiya, Amagasaki, and Ōsaka (Shin-Nagata) →
2F	Island platform
2F	Platform 2	→ (Same as platform 1) →
2F	Platform 3	← (Same as platform 4) ←
2F	Island platform
2F	Platform 4	← San'yo Main Line towards Nishi-Akashi and Himeji (Kōbe Station) ←

== Adjacent stations ==
«	Service	»
Sanyo Main Line (JR Kobe Line)
Kobe (JR-A63)	Rapid Service	Akashi (JR-A73)
Kobe (JR-A63)	Rapid Service	Suma (JR-A68)
Kobe (JR-A63)	Local	Shin-Nagata(JR-A65)
Special Rapid Service: Does not stop at this station
Wadamisaki Line
Terminus	Local	Wadamisaki
