= Wadamisaki Station =

Railway and metro station in Kobe, Japan

Coordinates: 34°39′24.76″N 135°10′28.87″E

Wadamisaki Station 和田岬駅
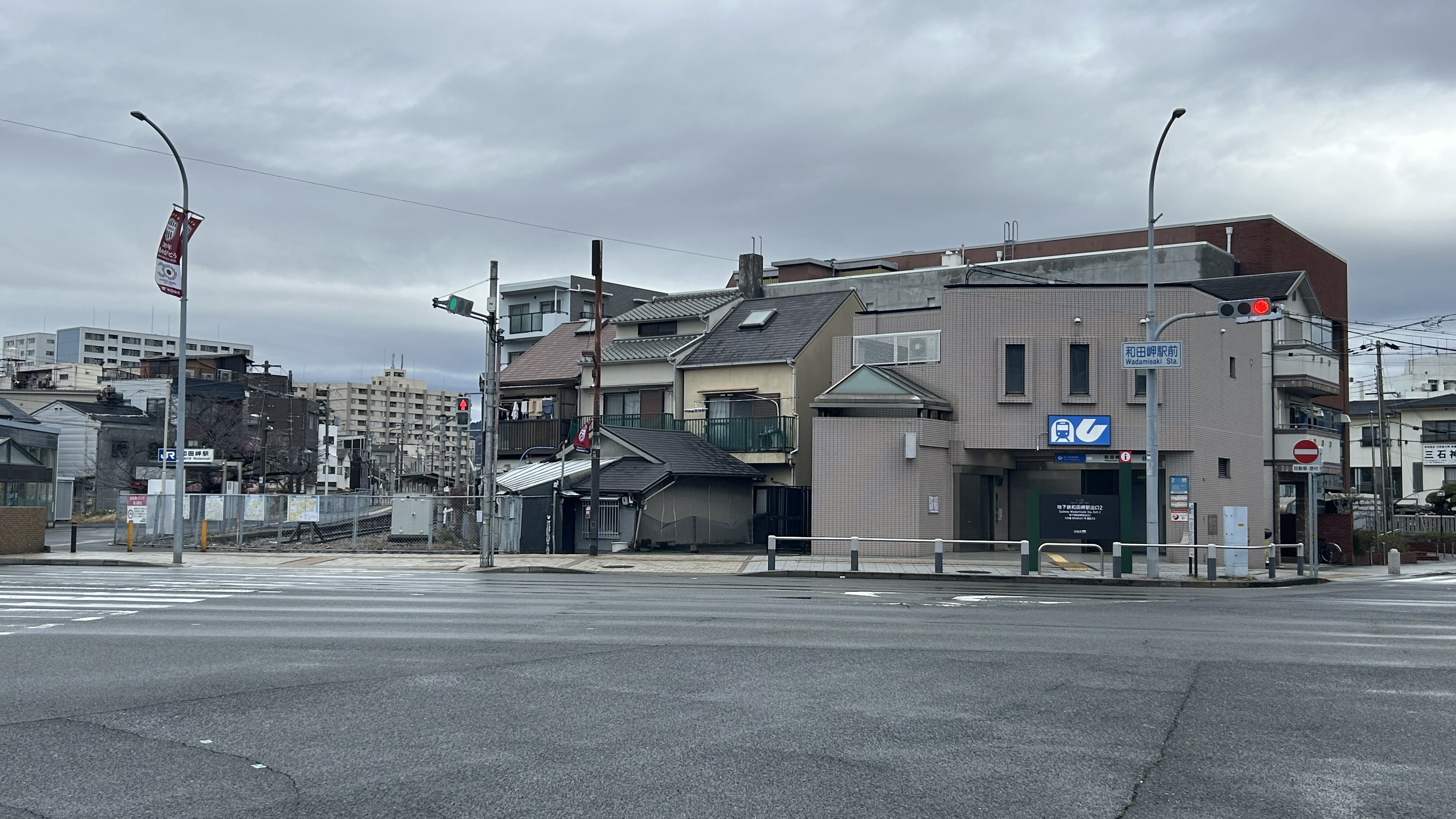
- JR Wadamisaki Station (left) and Entrance 2 of the subway (right)

General information
- Location: Hyōgo, Kōbe, Hyōgo; Japan
- System: JR West station Kobe Municipal Subway station
- Operator: JR West; Kobe Municipal Transportation Bureau
- Lines: Sanyo Main Line Wadamisaki Branch; Kaigan Line
- Platforms: 1 side platform (JR West); 1 island platform (Kaigan Line)
- Tracks: 1 (JR West); 2 (Kobe Municipal Subway)

Other information
- Station code: K06 (Kobe Municipal Subway)

History
- Opened: 8 July 1890 (JR West); 7 June 2001 (Kobe Municipal Subway)

Services
Preceding station	Kobe Municipal Subway	Following station
Misaki-Kōen towards Shin-Nagata	Kaigan Line	Chūō-Ichibamae towards Sannomiya-Hanadokeimae

Other services
Preceding station	JR West	Following station
Terminus	Wadamisaki Line	Hyōgo towards Kōbe
Location
- Location within Kobe Location within Hyōgo Prefecture Location within Japan

Wadamisaki Station (和田岬駅, Wadamisaki-eki) is a railway station in Hyogo-ku, Kobe, Japan, operated by West Japan Railway Company (JR West) and Kobe Municipal Subway.

== History ==
The subway station opened on 7 July 2001, coinciding with the opening of the Kaigan Line.

== Station layout ==
The JR West station is composed of a single track with one side platform. It is unstaffed and has unrestricted access to the platform. However, the Wadamisaki Line only operates during rush hours in the morning and evening. Fare collection for this station is conducted at Hyogo, the only other stop on the line.

The Kobe Municipal Subway station is composed of two tracks sandwiching an island platform. The station is staffed and is accessible by wheelchair.
