= Kaigan Line =

Subway line in Kobe, Japan

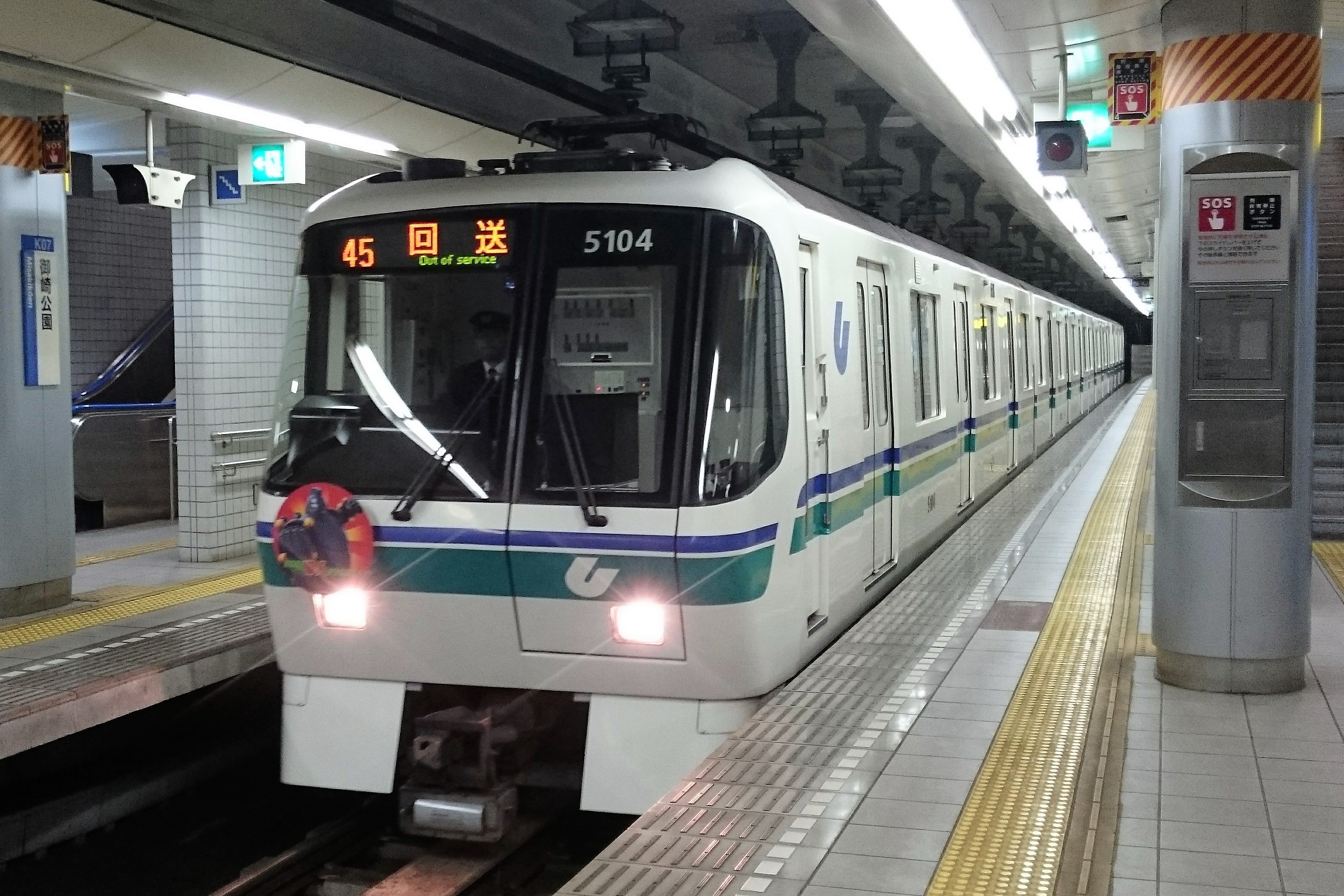
- A Kobe Municipal Subway 5000 series train in 2016

Overview
- Other name: Yumekamome
- Native name: 海岸線
- Status: Operational
- Owner: Kobe Municipal Transportation Bureau
- Locale: Kobe
- Termini: Sannomiya-Hanadokeimae; Shin-Nagata
- Stations: 10

Service
- Type: Rapid transit
- System: Kobe Municipal Subway
- Operator: Kobe Municipal Transportation Bureau

History
- Opened: 7 July 2001; 25 years ago

Technical
- Line length: 7.9 km (4.9 mi)
- Number of tracks: 2
- Track gauge: 1,435 mm (4 ft 8 1/2 in) standard gauge
- Electrification: 1,500 V DC overhead catenary
- Operating speed: 70 km/h (43 mph)
Route map
Kobe subway lines

The Kaigan Line (海岸線, Kaigan-sen; literally "Coast Line"), also known as the "Yumekamome" (Japanese: 夢かもめ), is one of three lines of the Kobe Municipal Subway. Trains of the line are propelled by linear motors. This is the third linear motor rapid transit line to be built in Japan.

== History ==
Construction of the line began in 1994 but was interrupted by the Great Hanshin earthquake which hit Kobe in 1995. Despite the cross section of the tunnels being smaller compared to a conventional subway tunnel, there was still a substantial amount of construction happening at surface level.

After being scheduled for a 1999 opening, revenue service began in 2001.

Since opening, ridership numbers have stagnated. While the projected ridership within 2001 was estimated to be 80,000 boardings, the actual boardings recorded were just over 34,000 in that year. The goal of 50,000 boardings by 2020 was also not achieved. As a result, the line has accumulated a deficit of over ¥100 billion over its first 20 years of operation.

== Operation ==
The line is 7.9 km (4.9 mi) long and runs between Shin-Nagata Station in the west to Sannomiya-Hanadokeimae Station in the east.

The maximum grade on the line is 50‰.

== Stations ==
No.	Name	Japanese	Inter-station distance (km)	Total distance (km)	Transfers
K01	Sannomiya-Hanadokeimae	三宮・花時計前	-	0.0	Seishin-Yamate Line (Sannomiya: S03); Hankyu Kobe Line; Kōbe Kōsoku Line (Sannomiya); Hanshin Main Line (Sannomiya); Port Island Line (Sannomiya: P01); Tōkaidō Main Line (JR Kobe Line) (Sannomiya (JR))
K02	Kyukyoryuchi-Daimarumae	旧居留地・大丸前	0.5	0.5	Tōkaidō Main Line (JR Kobe Line) (Motomachi); Hanshin Main Line; Kōbe Kōsoku Line (Motomachi)
K03	Minato Motomachi	みなと元町 (ワコーレ和田興産前)	0.8	1.3	
K04	Harborland	ハーバーランド (デュオこうべ前)	1.0	2.3	Tōkaidō Main Line, San'yō Main Line (JR Kobe Line) (Kobe); Kōbe Kōsoku Line (Kosoku Kobe)
K05	Chūō-Ichibamae	中央市場前	1.4	3.7	
K06	Wadamisaki	和田岬 (三菱神戸病院前)	0.9	4.6	San'yō Main Line (Wadamisaki Line)
K07	Misaki-Kōen	御崎公園	1.1	5.7	
K08	Karumo(Mitsuboshi Belting-mae)	苅藻 (三ツ星ベルト前)	0.8	6.5	
K09	Komagabayashi(Sangokushi no machi Aguro Garden mae )	駒ヶ林 (三国志のまち・アグロガーデン前)	0.8	7.3	
K10	Shin-Nagata	新長田 (鉄人28号前)	0.6	7.9	Seishin-Yamate Line (S09); San'yō Main Line (JR Kobe Line)

== Rolling stock ==
- 5000 series (since 2001)

All trains are based at Misaki-Kōen Depot.
