= Sannomiya-Hanadokeimae Station =

Metro station in Kobe, Japan

Coordinates: 34.6917°N 135.1957°E

Sannomiya-Hanadokeimae Station 三宮・花時計前駅
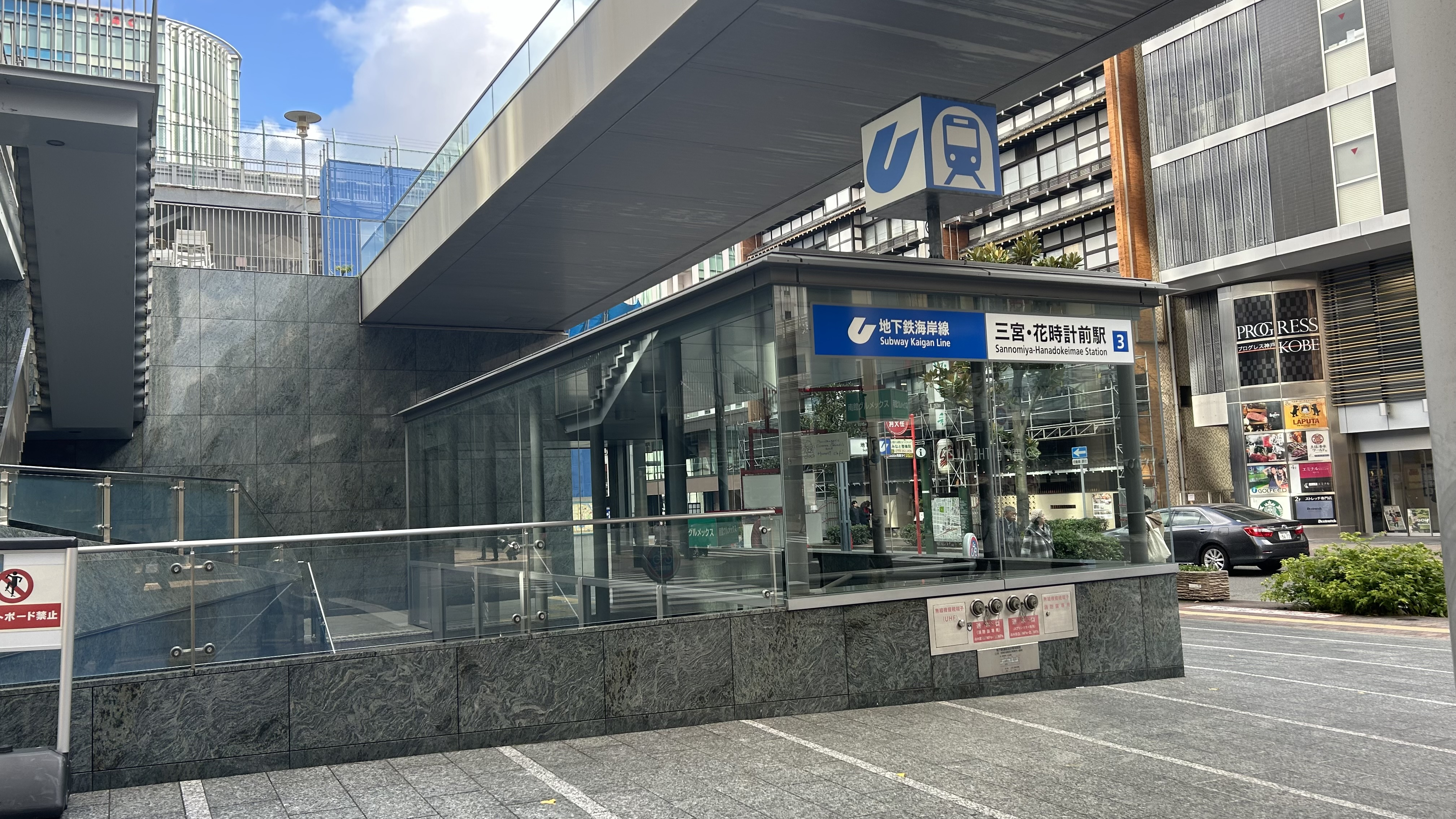
- The no.3 entrance

General information
- Location: Isogami-dori; Chūō-ku, Kobe, Hyōgo Prefecture; Japan
- System: Kobe Municipal Subway station
- Operator: Kobe Municipal Transportation Bureau
- Line: Kaigan Line
- Platforms: 1 island platform
- Tracks: 2
- Connections: Sannomiya: Sanyo Main Line; Seishin-Yamate Line; Seishin-Yamate Line, Hanshin Main Line, Hankyu Kobe Line, and Port Liner at Sannomiya

Construction
- Structure type: Underground

Other information
- Station code: K01

History
- Opened: 7 June 2001; 25 years ago

Services
Preceding station	Kobe Municipal Subway	Following station
Kyukyoryuchi-Daimarumae towards Shin-Nagata	Kaigan Line	Terminus
Location
- Location within Kobe Location within Hyōgo Prefecture Location within Japan

Sannomiya-Hanadokeimae Station (三宮・花時計前駅, Sannomiya-Hanadokeimae-eki; Station K01) is one of the termini on the Kobe Municipal Subway Kaigan Line in Chūō-ku, Kobe, Hyōgo Prefecture, Japan.

This station is part of a complex shared with Sannomiya, which is used by the Seishin-Yamate Line, the Hanshin Main Line, and the Port Liner. Free transfers are available from the Kaigan Line station to the Seishin-Yamate Line station, but passengers are limited to 90 minutes to change trains when using regular tickets and IC cards.

== Layout ==
This station has an island platform serving two tracks.

1, 2	■ Kaigan Line	for Wadamisaki and Shin-Nagata

== Connections ==
Sannomiya Station
- JR West Tokaido Line (JR Kobe Line)
Sannomiya Station (others)
- Port Liner (P01)
- Kobe Municipal Subway
  - Seishin-Yamate Line (S03)
Kobe-sannomiya Station
- Hanshin Railway Main Line (HS 32)
- Hankyu Railway Kobe Line, Kobe Kosoku Line (HK-16)

== History ==
The station was opened on 7 July 2001.

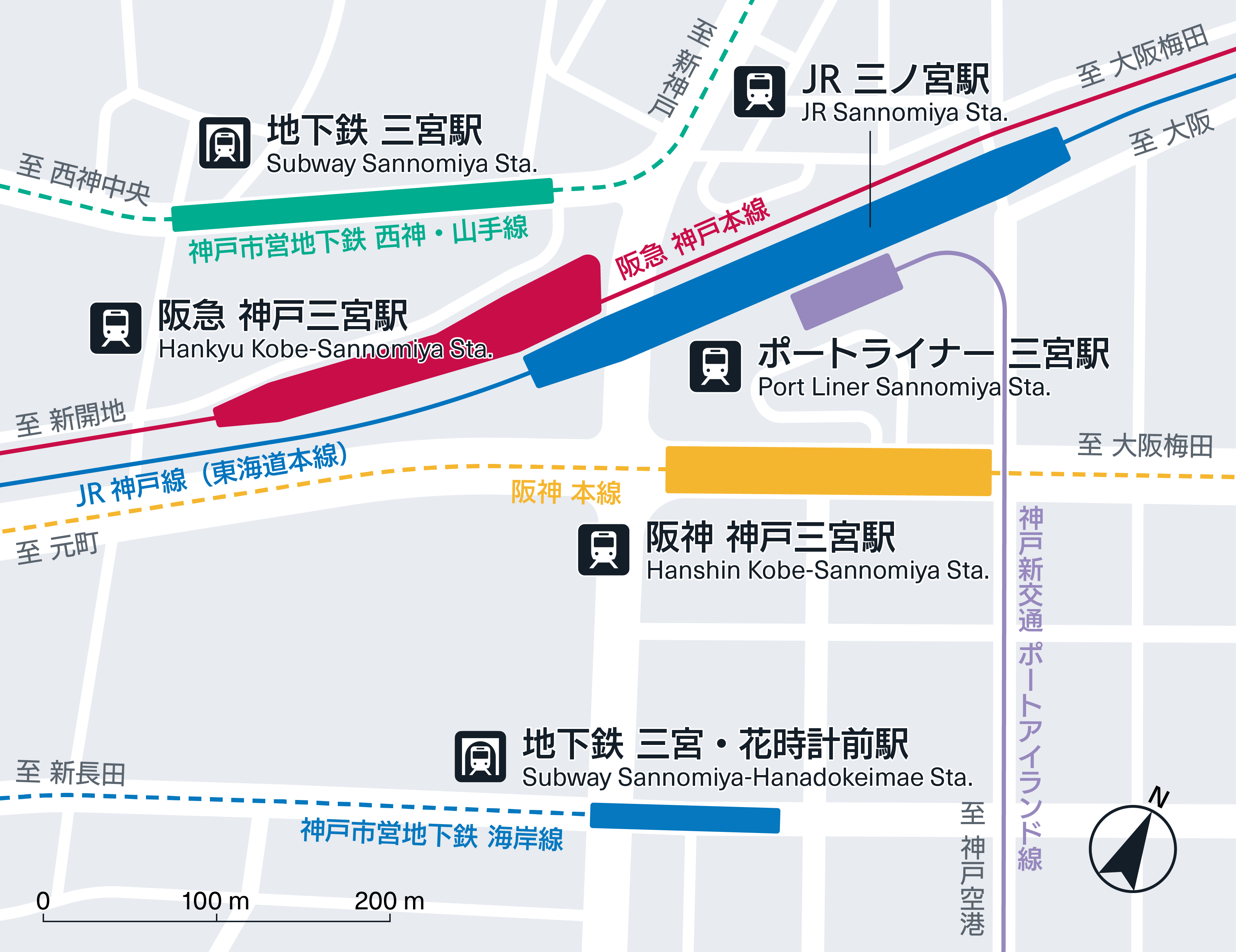
- Location of the six stations at Sannomiya

== Surroundings ==
- Kobe International House
- Mizuho Bank, Ltd., Mizuho Trust & Banking Co., Ltd.
- Kobe City Hall
- Sumitomo Mitsui Banking Corporation
- MUFG Bank, Ltd.
- The Tokushima Bank, Ltd.
- The Hyakujushi Bank, Limited
- KEPCO Kobe Building
