= Shin-Nagata Station =

Railway and metro station in Kobe, Japan

Coordinates: 34°39′24″N 135°8′37″E

Shin-Nagata 新長田駅
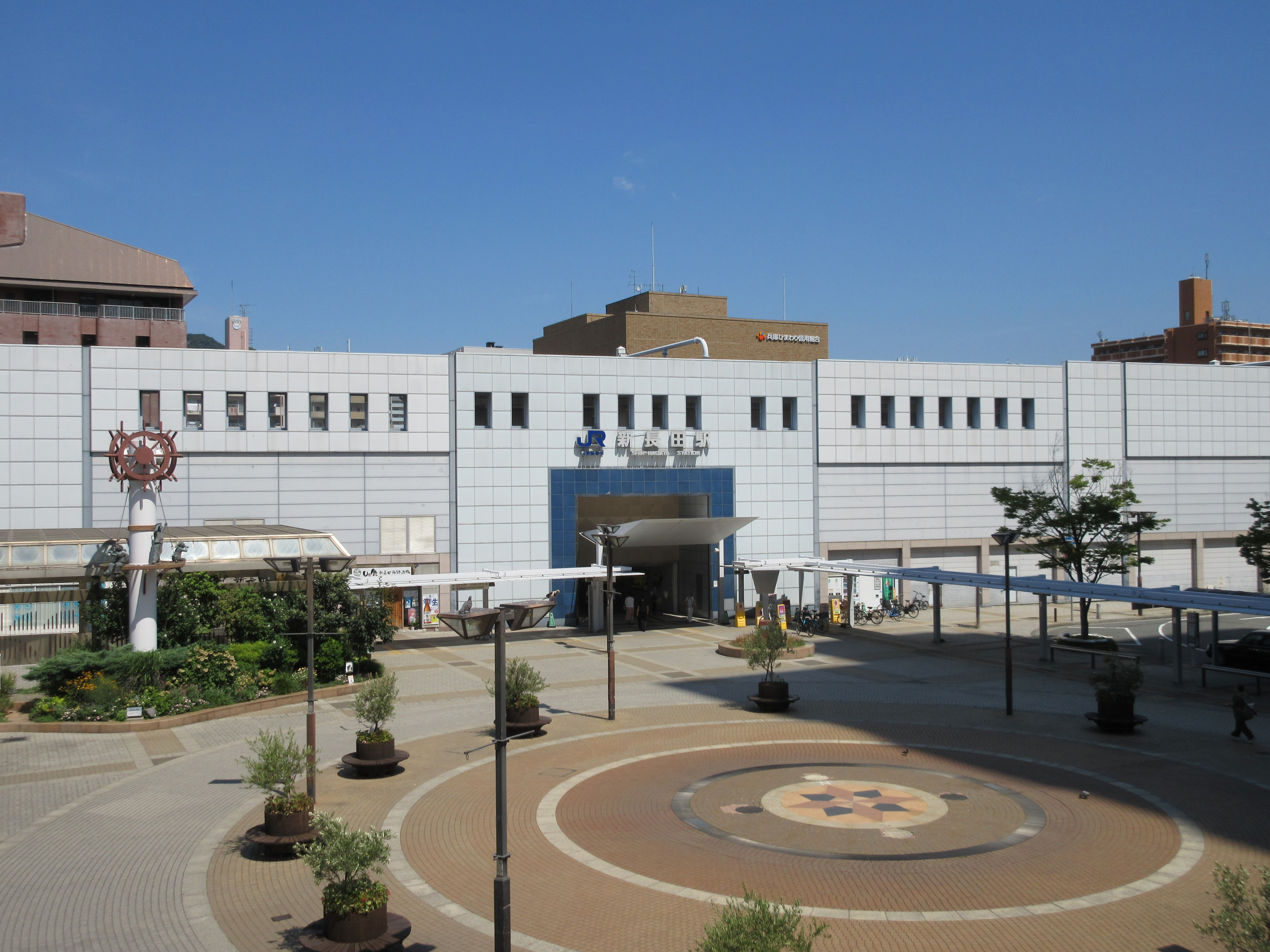
- JR West station south square

General information
- Other names: Tetsujin 28-go mae (Kobe Municipal Subway)
- Operator: JR West; Kobe Municipal Subway
- Lines: Sanyo Main Line; Seishin-Yamate Line; Kaigan Line
- Platforms: 2 side platforms (JR West); 1 island platform (Seishin-Yamate Line); 1 island platform (Kaigan Line)
- Tracks: 6

Other information
- Station code: JR-A65 (Sanyo Main Line); S09 (Seishin-Yamate Line); K10 (Kaigan Line)

History
- Opened: 1954 (JR West); 1977 (Kobe Municipal Subway)

Services
Preceding station	Kobe Municipal Subway	Following station
Itayado towards Seishin-Chuo	Seishin-Yamate Line	Nagata towards Shin-Kobe
Terminus	Kaigan Line	Komagabayashi towards Sannomiya-Hanadokeimae
Location
- Location within Kobe Location within Hyōgo Prefecture Location within Japan

Shin-Nagata Station (新長田駅, Shin-Nagata-eki) is a railway station and a metro station in Nagata-ku, Kobe, Hyōgo Prefecture, Japan.

== Lines ==
- West Japan Railway Company (JR West)
  - Sanyo Main Line (JR Kobe Line)
- Kobe Municipal Subway
  - Seishin-Yamate Line
  - Kaigan Line

== History ==
The JR West station opened under JNR ownership on 1 April 1954. After the privatization of JNR in 1987, the station became incorporated into the JR Kobe Line when it began services the next year.

The Kobe Municipal Subway station opened in 1977 as part of the first phase of the Seishin-Yamate Line, initially serving as the terminus of the subway line (the line would be extended to Ōkurayama in 1983).

On 17 January 1995, the station sustained damage during the Great Hanshin earthquake on 17 January 1995, and remained closed for a short amount of time as repairs were taking place. Normal service on the JR Kobe Line resumed on 30 January while the subway resumed operations on 16 February of that year.

In 1996, an elevator and escalator were added to the JR West station as part of the station's renovation following the earthquake.

The Kaigan Line platforms opened on 7 July 2001.

Station numbering was introduced to the JR West platforms in March 2018 with Shin-Nagata being assigned station number JR-A65.

== Station layout ==
=== JR West ===
The Sanyo Main Line at Shin-Nagata features five tracks, three of which bypasses the station just to its north and the other two which serves the station. East of the station, the track alignment on the line changes. The two local tracks become the innermost tracks, while the three bypass tracks straddle the local tracks.

==== Platforms ====
The Sanyo Main Line platforms are located on an elevated section of the line. It features two side platforms and two tracks. There are additional express tracks just north of the platforms that allow trains to bypass the station.

1	■ Sanyo Main Line	for Sannomiya, Amagasaki, and Osaka
2	■ Sanyo Main Line	for Nishi-Akashi and Himeji

=== Kobe Municipal Subway ===
==== Platforms ====
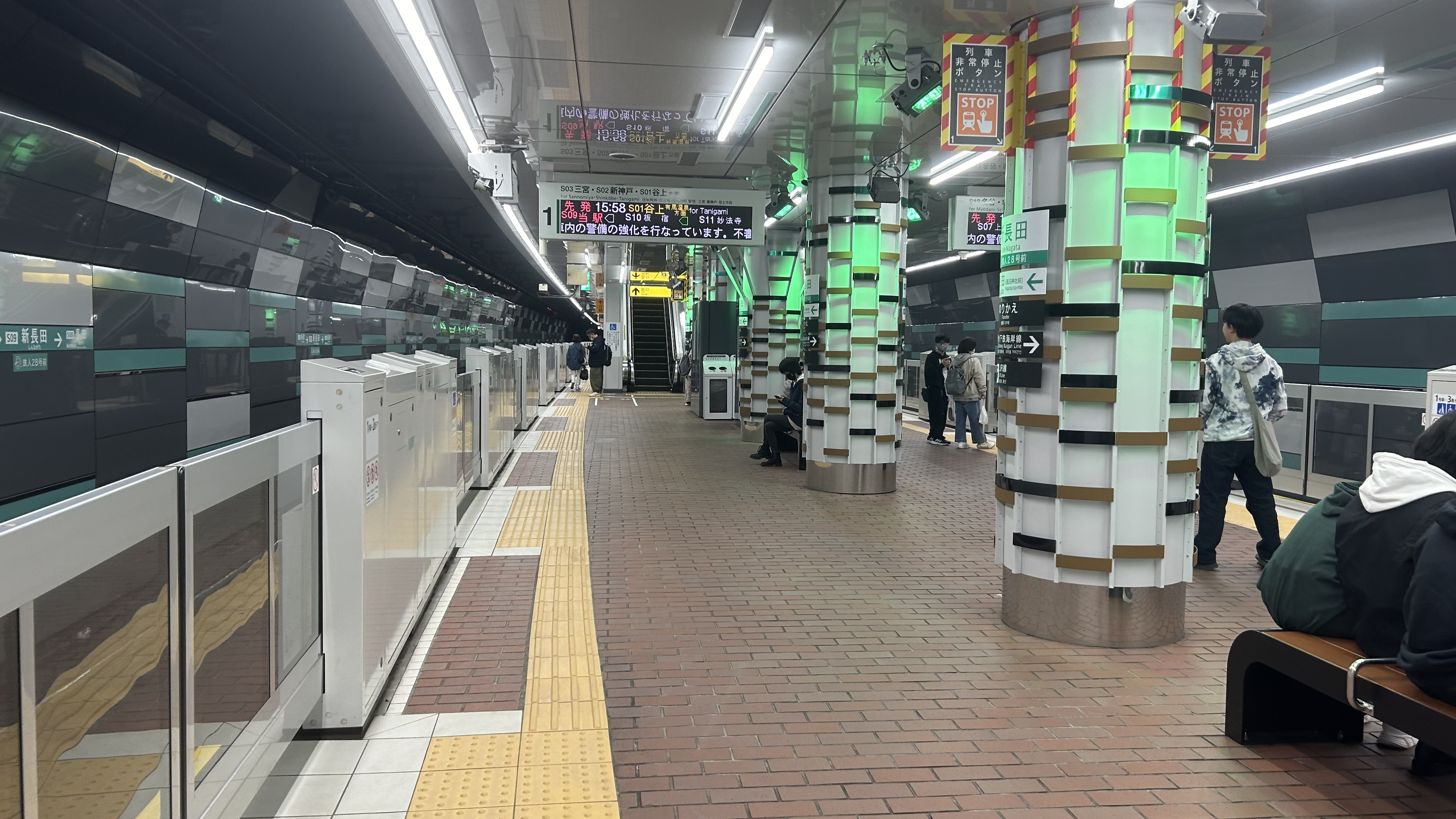
Seishin-Yamate Line platform

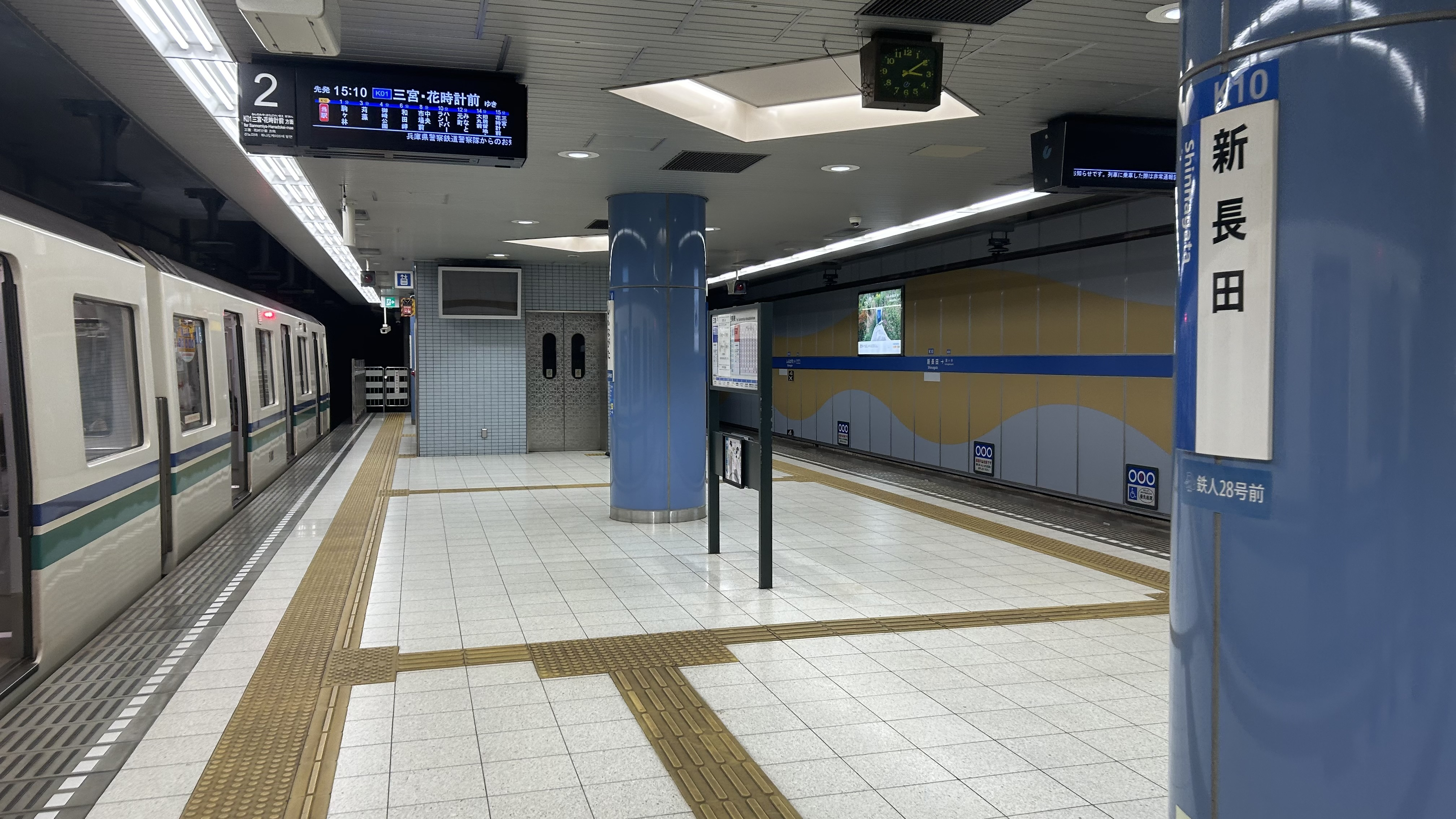
Kaigan Line platform

The Seishin-Yamate Line platform is located on the second basement ("B2F") level, and the Kaigan Line platform is located on the third basement ("B3F") level.

1	■ Seishin-Yamate Line	for Sannomiya, Shin-Kobe, and Tanigami
2	■ Seishin-Yamate Line	for Myōdani and Seishin-chūō

1, 2	■ Kaigan Line	for Harborland and Sannomiya-Hanadokeimae

== Adjacent stations ==
«	Service	»
West Japan Railway Company (JR West)
Sanyo Main Line (JR Kobe Line)
Special Rapid Service: Does not stop at this station
Rapid Service: Does not stop at this station
Hyōgo	Local	Takatori
