= Transport for London emergency response unit =

Emergency response unit in London

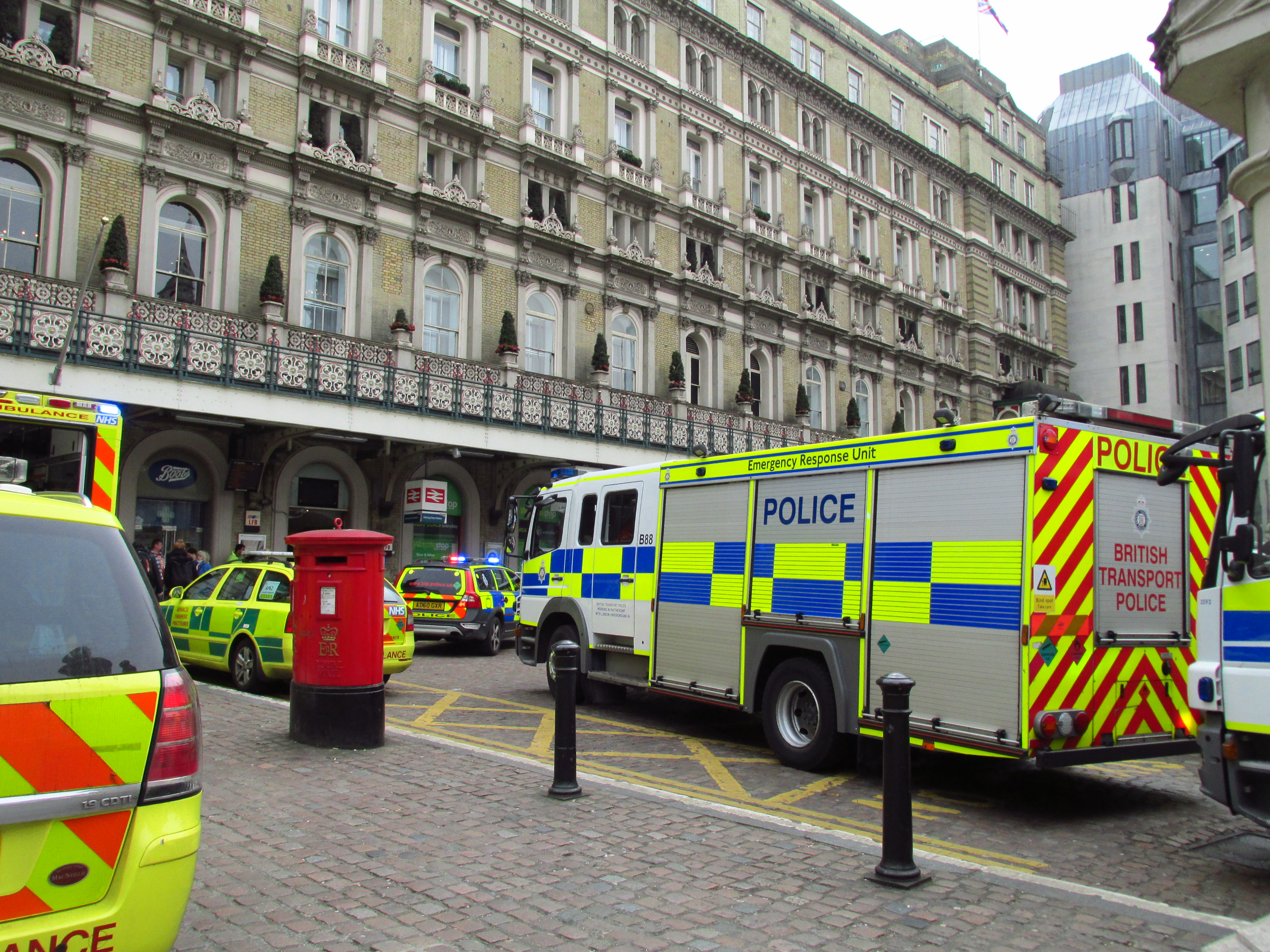
Transport for London Emergency Response Unit vehicle at Charing Cross station

The Transport for London emergency response unit (ERU) is the emergency response unit for the London Underground, Docklands Light Railway (DLR), London Overground and Tramlink.

The ERU responds to incidents such as rail suicide, derailments, incidents and major disasters involving the rail network. It uses specialised equipment to support tunnels, get into trains and rescue passengers and others. The Transport Committee of the London Assembly describes the ERU as "a small and little-known unit" and that they are "experts in dealing with emergencies on and around trains". The unit has over 100 staff.

== Overview ==
The emergency response unit (ERU) was established in 1993, following the merger of London Underground track and rolling stock response teams into one unit. As part of the public–private partnership on the Underground in the 2000s, Tube Lines won the contract to operate the ERU – servicing all Underground lines and other transport services. The ERU returned to TfL in 2010 following the buyout of Tube Lines.

When the ERU is required, it will be requested by the relevant control centre, with an ERU team dispatched to the incident. It is a level 2 responder - meaning it advises level 1 responders, such as ambulance services and the police, on the correct procedures for navigation and recovery of those injured in systems such as railway tracks - and has 4 bases in Acton, Stratford, Camden, and Battersea.

=== Blue light use ===
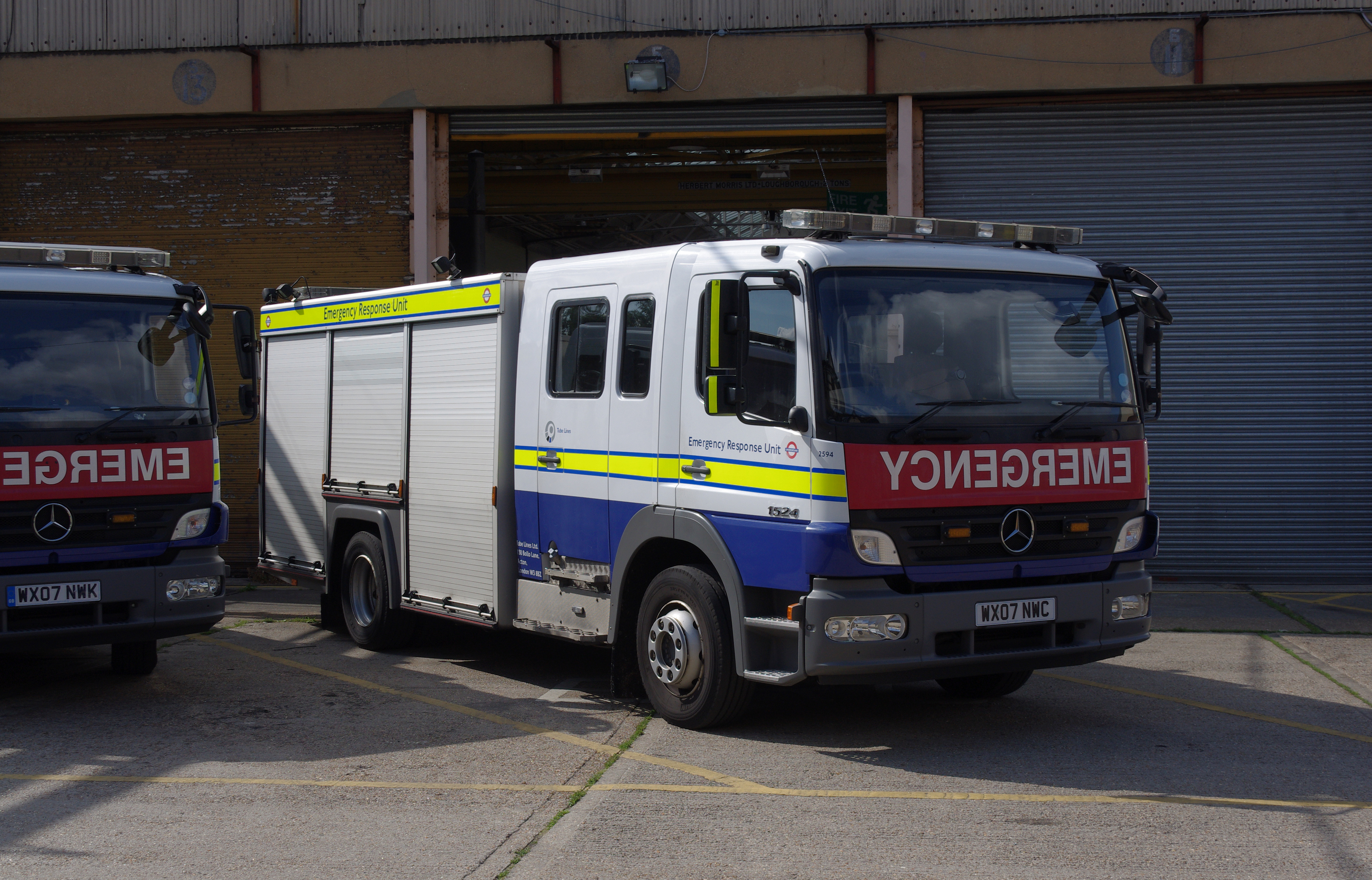
Prior to the implementation of blue lights and 'POLICE' livery, the vehicles were fitted with red and amber lights.

Following the 7 July 2005 London bombings, the Transport Committee of the London Assembly recommended that the ERU "should be automatically exempt from the congestion charge, should be allowed to drive in bus lanes, should also have blue lights", concluding that this would "help the unit to get to the scenes of emergencies on the Tube much more rapidly".

British Transport Police (BTP) subsequently embedded officers with the ERU, with vehicles given blue lights and police markings. The vehicles were driven by BTP officers, so once at the scene the officer could perform regular policing duties in relation to crime or public safety issues. The use of the blue lights on the unit's vehicles was subject to the same criteria as with any other police vehicle.

In December 2013, Transport for London (TfL) announced at the end of the trial period that ERU vehicles would retain blue lights, as the ERU's response time to incidents had been halved.

==== Withdrawal ====
The use of blue lights and police livery ended in 2024 after a review determined that it did not meet national guidelines for blue-light responses, and that it would minimise collisions. The London Assembly urged for this decision to be reversed. Elly Baker AM (chair of the assembly's transport committee) said "Londoners have been left in the dark about why this decision was taken and what evidence there is to support it." The RMT trade union also urged TfL and BTP to reverse this decision; stating that it will harm the safety of the public and staff.

== Network Rail contract ==
As of March 2025, Network Rail Infrastructure Limited issued a tender for the continued provision of ERU services, resulting in a contract awarded to London Underground for a three-year period with five optional extensions, valued at £1.2 million.

== See also ==
- British Transport Police § Medic Response Unit
- British Transport Police § Emergency Response Unit
- Safety on the London Underground
