= Suicide on the London Underground =

Rail suicide has been a regular occurrence on the London Underground (also known as the 'Tube') since it was built in the 19th century. It involves a person intentionally jumping into an oncoming train's path so that the impact kills them.

All injuries and deaths on railways must be reported, in accordance with the Regulation of Railways Act 1873.

== Effect of track layout ==
About half of the London Underground stations, mostly those actually underground, have a pit under the tracks. Originally constructed to drain water, these features have since been shown to reduce the number and severity of injuries and number of deaths, although not to eliminate them. A Transport for London (TfL) spokesperson has commented, "people fall into them and the train rushes on overhead… but that's not to say they don't get maimed". A study of 58 cases showed that the presence of a pit halved the number of deaths.

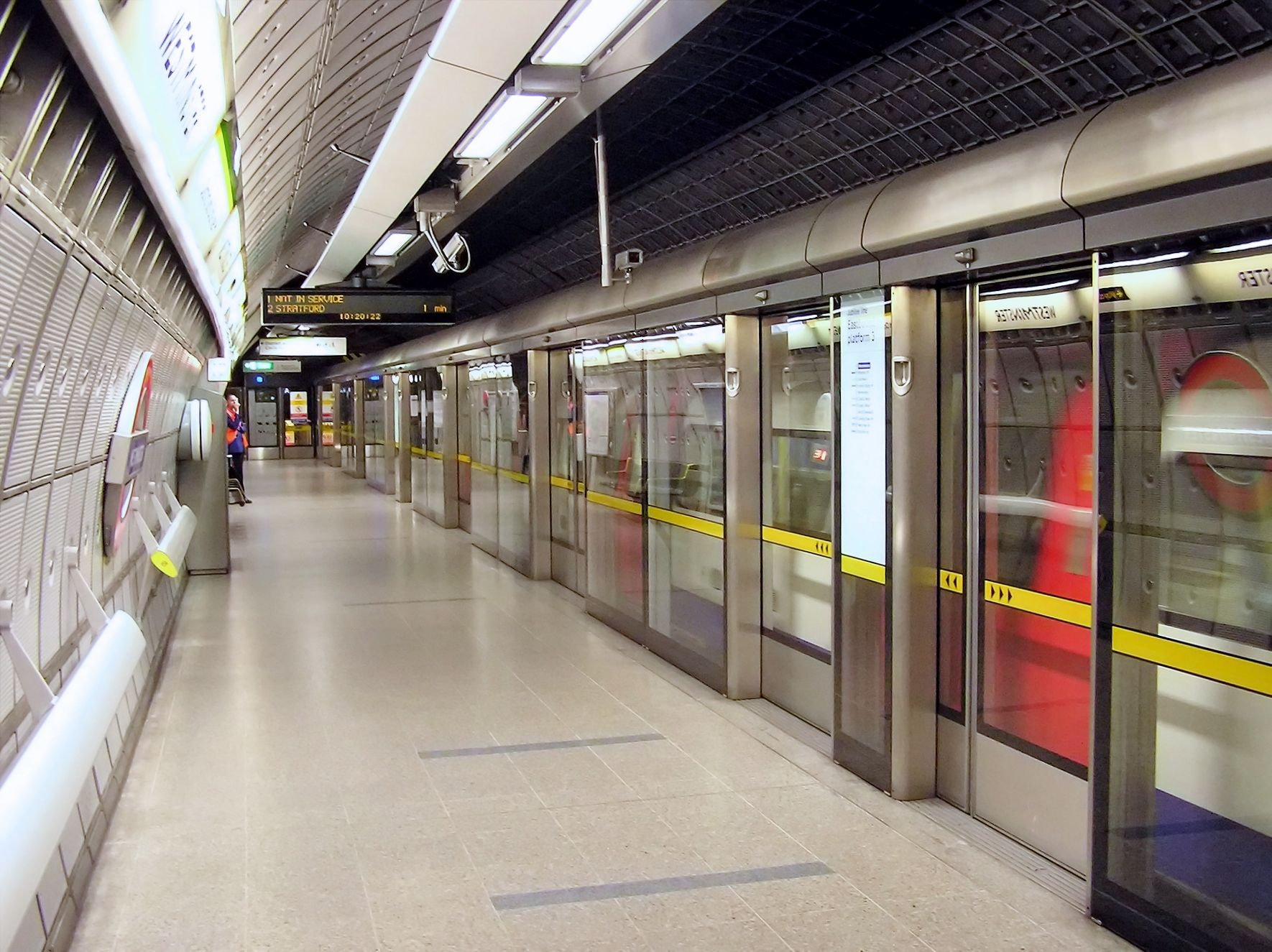
Platform screen doors at Westminster

A more recent and more effective safety mechanism is platform screen doors (PSDs), which separate passengers from the track, removing the opportunity to jump under an oncoming train. By 2003, these had been installed at the below-ground stations of the Jubilee Line Extension. However, they are expensive to install and can fail to open, adding a potential reliability problem to train services. In 2014, a TfL feasibility study looked at installing PSDs in older London Underground stations on the Bakerloo, Central, Piccadilly, and Waterloo & City lines, as part of the New Tube for London project. There was a provision for PSDs on the Northern line extension to Battersea, but in the event they were not installed in the stations by the time they opened in 2021.

== Statistics ==
Most deaths on the Underground are suicides. Research in the 1990s found that 93% of deaths were deliberate and only 7% were the result of accidents. There had been no attempted murders during the period studied, though one such event was recorded in February 2024.

The origins of the London Underground are in the Metropolitan Railway, the world's first underground passenger railway, which opened on 10 January 1863. There were newspaper reports of cases of suicide on the new railway in 1867 and 1868, after which deaths by suicide on English railways increased significantly.

The annual number of suicides on the London Underground in the 1940s was about 25, increasing to 100 by the 1980s. A study in 1991 suggested a connection between passenger numbers and deaths, but noted that this increase was smaller than what would have been expected, given the increase in passenger numbers.

Between 1940 and 1990 there were a total of 3,240 incidents of "persons under a train". Research in 1994 found that 64% of such incidents involved males, and that those seeking to kill themselves were disproportionately young.

The fatality rate fell from 70 per cent in the 1950s to about 55 per cent in 1990, and in 1993 a TfL spokesman said that only 40 per cent of attempts were then resulting in death. Stations near to psychiatric units tended to have a high number of suicides, and a high proportion were committed by patients with a mental illness: 55 per cent at Tooting Bec station.

In the 1990s, those who survived suicide attempts were often charged with offences such as "endangering safety on the railway" and "obstruction of trains with intent".

A study of suicide published in 2001 found that there were between 100 and 150 suicides a year on the London Underground. As of December 2004, suicides on the London Underground occurred at an average rate of once per week, and similarly, a report by Time magazine in 2008 said there had been 50 such suicides in 2007.

In 2011, figures for the previous eleven years were released by TfL. The rate had gone up to 80 per year, as compared with 46 in the year 2000, and this was attributed to the 2008 financial crisis. The worst-affected station was King's Cross St Pancras while the numbers for the decade by line were:

Suicide attempts by line for the period 2000–2010
Line	Suicide attempts
Northern	145
Central	99
Piccadilly	92
District	81
Victoria	63
Metropolitan	56
Circle and Hammersmith & City	47
Bakerloo	33
Jubilee	27
Total	643

== Staff training facility ==
In 2010, at a cost of £800,000, TFL opened the West Ashfield training facility, a special staff training centre on the third floor of its Ashfield House, West Kensington. It is a mock-up of a station and platform where tube staff can undergo realistic training in the event of an incident. The suicide pit is a painted feature. However, a joint venture between TfL and the developers of the Earls Court Exhibition Centre plans to regenerate the area, shutting down the historic Lillie Bridge Depot along with Ashfield House by 2024.

== Euphemisms ==
Underground management and train drivers use several phrases to refer to suicides, sometimes using "person under a train" or "passenger taken unwell" (usually to inform the public), "person on the track", "passenger action," but most commonly "one under", or "jumper" — well-known phrases across the network.

== In popular culture ==
In 2008, the comedy film Three and Out was released, about a Tube train driver who is told that if he witnesses three suicides in a month, he will lose his job, but will receive a large amount of money. ASLEF, the train drivers' union, criticised the film, saying it was insulting and foolish.

In 2020, Wilbur Soot released the song "Jubilee Line", which references the platform screen doors that are installed on the Jubilee Line Extensions.

== See also ==
- Safety on the London Underground
