= Yone Suzuki =

Japanese businesswoman (1852–1938)

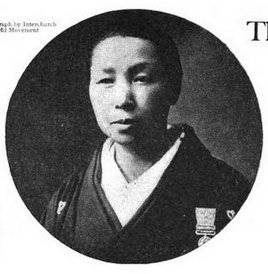
Yone Suzuki, from a 1918 publication.

Yone Suzuki (鈴木よね, 1852.8.15–1938.5.6) was a Japanese businesswoman, described in 1918 as "the wealthiest woman in Japan".

== Early life ==
Yone Suzuki was from Osaka or Himeji.

== Career ==
As a widow with two sons, Yone Suzuki took over her late husband's business, the Suzuki Trading Company (Suzuki Shoten), trusting manager Kaneko Naokichi with many of the strategic decisions. In 1900, she made a fortune in a deal involving sugar, real estate, and camphor. She started a peppermint factory, she bought the Kobe Steel Works, and expanded her operations in camphor manufacture, sugar refineries and flour mills. She built a factories to produce fish oil and bean oil, owned a fleet of ships, and added branch offices of the Suzuki conglomerate in several international locations, including Europe, North America, Australia, and elsewhere in Asia.

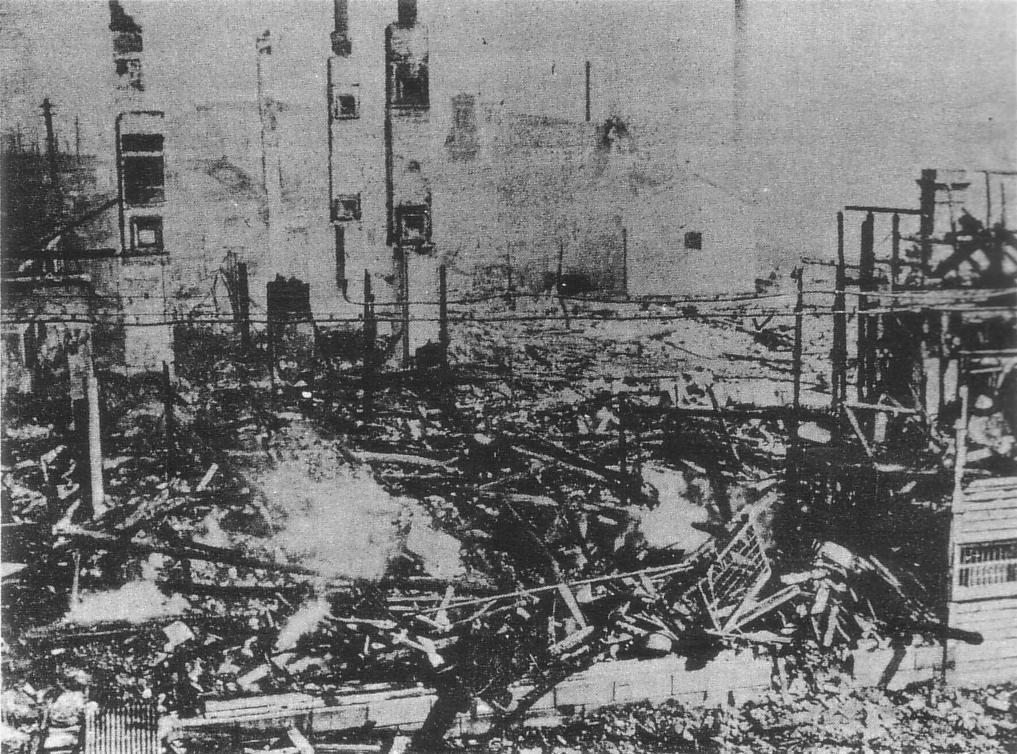
Suzuki Shoten burnt out, 1918

She was described in 1918 as "the wealthiest woman in Japan", and in 1927 as the "richest woman in the world." However, she was also described as "one of the best-hated persons in the country" for taking advantage of wartime conditions and for running up the price of rice. She had to go into hiding with an alias for a while during the rice riots of 1918, after angry crowds burned her company's headquarters in Kobe.

The Suzuki conglomerate was badly affected by a foreign exchange crisis in 1923–1924, and finally failed in a financial panic in 1927. The 1923 Great Kantō earthquake, dysfunctional internal dynamics, unpopular business practices, and external rivalries with other large Japanese conglomerates (zaibatsu), are also cited as contributing to the Suzuki collapse. Among the present-day companies descended from Suzuki & Co. are Kobe Steel, Sojitz, and J-oilmils (Honen Corporation).

== Personal life and legacy ==
She married Iwajiro Suzuki, a sugar merchant, when she was 13 years old. Their sons were Iwajiro and Ewazo. She was widowed when he died in 1894. At the peak of her wealth, she lived in a mansion at Suma-ku, Kobe; she moved into more frugal conditions after the collapse of Suzuki & Co.

The 2014 Japanese television drama Oiesan was a historical drama based on a novel by Kaoru Tamaoka about Yone Suzuki's life. Yūki Amami played Yone Suzuki in the program.
