= Rail suicide =

Deliberate death by means of a railway vehicle

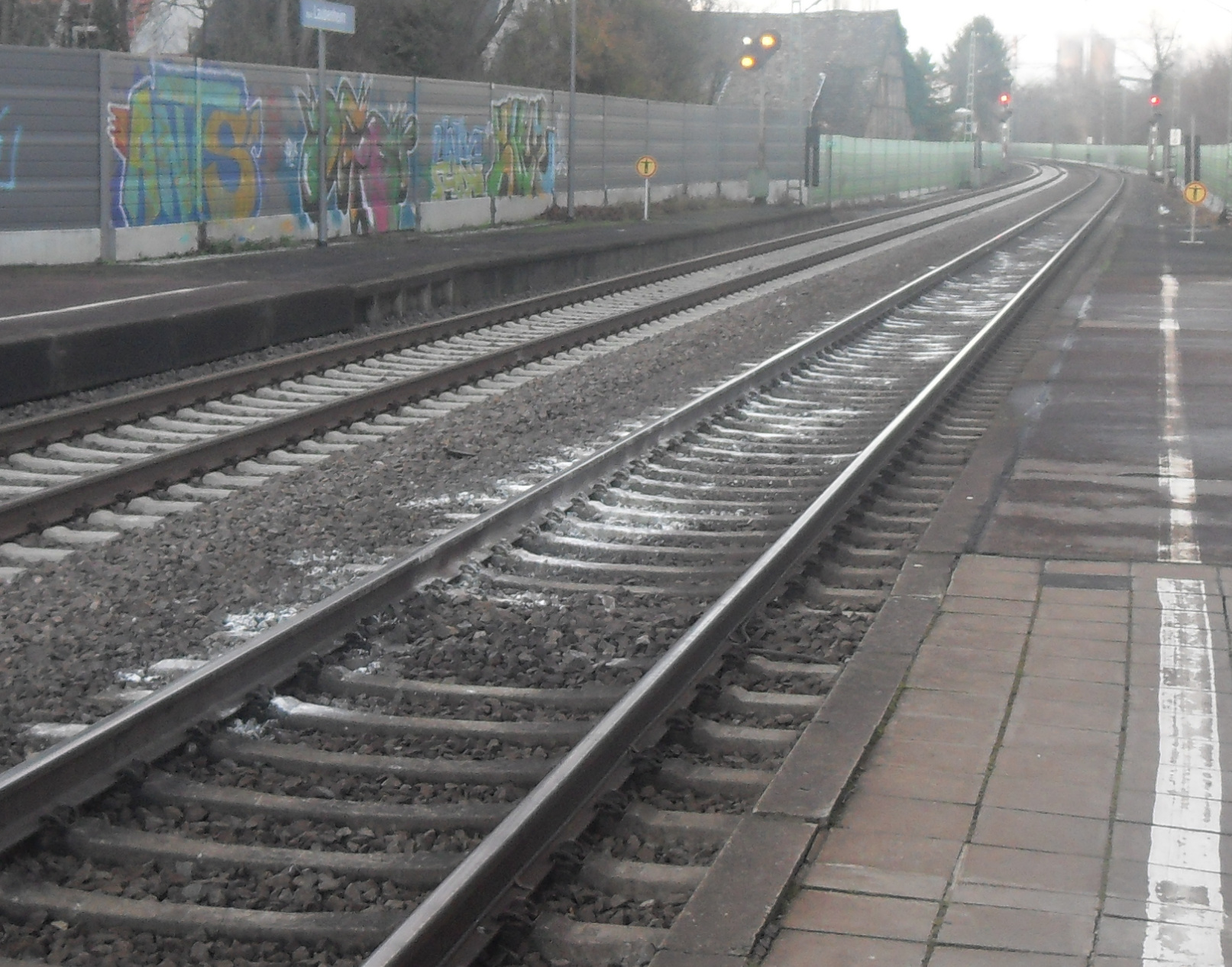
Lime on rails being used as a disinfectant after a suicide at Mainz-Laubenheim, Germany

Rail suicide, or suicide by train, is deliberate self-harm resulting in death by means of impact from a moving rail vehicle. The suicide occurs when an approaching train hits a suicidal pedestrian jumping onto, lying down on, or walking or standing on the tracks. Low friction on the tracks usually makes it impossible for the train to stop quickly enough. On urban mass transit rail systems that use a high-voltage electrified third rail, the suicide may also touch or be otherwise drawn into contact with it, adding electrocution to the cause of death.

Unlike other methods, rail suicide often directly affects the general public. Trains must be temporarily rerouted and diverted to clean the tracks and investigate the incident, causing delays for passengers and crews that may extend far beyond the site, a costly economic inconvenience. Train drivers in particular, effectively forced into being accomplices to the suicide they witness, often suffer post-traumatic stress disorder that adversely affects their personal lives and careers. In recent years railways and their unions have been offering more support to afflicted drivers.

Research into the demographics of rail suicide has shown that most are male and have diagnosed mental illness, to a greater extent than suicides in general. The correlation of rail suicide and mental illness has led to some sites along rail lines near mental hospitals becoming rail suicide hotspots; some researchers have recommended that no such facilities be located within walking distance of stations. Within the developed world, the Netherlands and Germany have high rates of rail suicide while the U.S. and Canada have the lowest rates. While suicides on urban mass transit usually take place at stations, on conventional rail systems they are generally split almost evenly between stations, level crossings and the open stretches of track between them.

Prevention efforts have generally focused on suicide in general, on the grounds that not much can be done at tracks themselves, since suicidal individuals are believed to be determined enough to overcome most efforts to keep them from the tracks. Rail-specific means of prevention have included platform screen doors, which has been highly successful at reducing suicide on some urban mass transit systems, calming lights and ambient music, and putting signs with suicide hotline numbers at sites likely to be used. Some rail networks have also trained their staff to watch, either in person or remotely, for behavioural indicators of a possible suicide attempt and intervene before it happens. Media organisations have also been advised to be circumspect in reporting some details of a rail suicide in order to avoid copycat suicides, such as those that happened after German football goalkeeper Robert Enke took his own life on the tracks in 2009, a suicide widely covered in European media.

== History ==
The first recorded train suicide occurred in 1852 in England, where rail development in Europe had been most advanced. In 1879 an Italian researcher noted that railway suicides were most common in Italy's northern Piedmont region, where the rail network was at its most extensive. This led the sociologist Émile Durkheim to reason in his 1897 work Suicide that "the more the land is covered with railroads, the more general becomes the habit of seeking death by throwing one's self under a train," a proposition which has since been generally accepted as a rule.

Japan's earliest documented rail suicide occurred in 1876, less than four years after the opening of the country's first railway line. The following month, the Yomiuri Shimbun newspaper reported a second suicide, cautioning its readers that "these days, a strange new way of dying has begun." (Note: Original Japanese text: 「此ごろは妙な一ッの死にやうが始まりました。」Taken from Yomiuri Shimbun, September 4, 1876.)

== Methods ==
Rail suicides typically assume one of three postures: "jumpers" who jump in front of a train from a station platform, "liers" lying on the tracks as one approaches, (Note: Lying on the tracks includes suicide by train decapitation as well as hara kiri by train. In suicide by train decapitation, victims lie on the tracks in front of approaching trains, with the neck placed on a rail and run over by a train wheel; in hara kiri, the train wheel runs over the abdomen.) and "walkers" who wander onto the tracks before the trains are present, a division first identified by researchers on the New York City Subway in 1972, who found jumping the most common and deadliest in their sample. A fourth group included "touchers," all of whom were women, who often went on the tracks after trains had left and deliberately touched the electrified third rail. A German researcher also found some outlying methods like jumping from a moving train (Note: An extremely rare method (see the "In Fiction" section discussing the scene from Double Indemnity), although British cricketer Robert Minton chose to jump from a passenger compartment in 1928.) and jumping from a bridge into the path of an approaching train. A railway suicide can also be committed by a vehicle driver, (Note: One suicide in Australia rode a bicycle into the train.) such as the Ufton Nervet rail crash, which killed seven others on the train. In addition to individual suicides, joint suicides on railways have also been reported.

Studies have found the preferred method differs by country. A 2005 Swedish study found walkers most predominant among 145 suicides, followed by those who sat or lay on the tracks with jumpers third, while a 2008 Australian study of 161 suicides along the Queensland rail network found sitters/liers most common with jumpers and walkers evenly split. German researchers in 2011, looking at over a thousand cases over five years, found the proportions nearly equal, with jumping the least likely to be fatal; twelve years later another group of Germans found liers the largest share, with jumpers close behind. A 2013 U.S. study of 50 suicides where this information was available found a slight edge for liers, with walkers and jumpers evenly split. Electrocution via third rails remains rare; it most often happens in conjunction with suicides on subways or metros, where the body comes in contact with the third rail as it is run over by the train.

German researchers believe walkers are most likely to have planned their suicides in advance, while jumpers do it on impulse.

=== Difference to trespasser accident ===
A collision with a suicidal pedestrian is different from a collision with an unauthorised person, a trespasser, who has illegally entered the tracks, and can be distinguished, according to the European Union Agency for Railways, by the presence of suicidal intent. Ovenstone criteria are mentioned for categorizing a suicidal intent.

== Locations ==
=== General locations along lines ===
Researchers have tried to determine what locations along tracks are more at risk for suicide than others. In response to a 2009 cluster of rail suicides by teens at a level crossing along the Caltrain commuter line in Palo Alto, California, the Mineta Transportation Institute (MTI) at nearby San Jose State University studied 17 years of data from Caltrain on suicides and unintended pedestrian fatalities along the 124.7-kilometre (77.5 mi) line from downtown San Francisco south along the Santa Clara Valley for any trends or patterns that might help prevent suicides. The researchers found that while only 20% occurred at stations, most were within 500 metres (0.3 mi) of a station or nearby crossing. (Note: Similarly, researchers in an earlier study of German rail suicides found that only a third occurred at stations.) They theorized that people attempting rail suicide used the stations primarily to access the tracks, wanted to ensure that the train was traveling at a speed as high as possible, and that no one was able to interfere with them. Researchers in Canada have found that two-thirds of rail suicides there occur on open track, with only 2% at stations.

In a broader sense, some sections of track seem more attractive than others; population density in the areas the line passes through may have some effect. The MTI researchers studying Caltrain suicides found that a 40-kilometre (25 mi) section of track between the Burlingame and Sunnyvale stations accounted for a larger share of suicides than the rest of the line, and a greater incidence than trespass fatalities in that area. A Caltrain representative they contacted noted that that section was one of the oldest on the line, with largely residential areas adjacent to the tracks, whereas the line north of that section went through more commercial areas and into tunnels where it might be less accessible. The paucity of suicides south of San Jose's Diridon station was attributed to the lower frequency of train service between there and the line's southern terminus at Gilroy.

Other researchers have reported a similar correlation. A 2018 Belgian study found that the rail suicide rate over a five-year period was highest along lines in suburban areas. The researchers theorized that tracks in those areas are more accessible than they are in cities, and the trains operate at the same frequency as those in the nearby urban areas but at higher speeds. In what the researchers deemed "high-risk" locations, 2–km (3.2–mile) sections of line where two or more suicides had occurred during the time frame of the study, they noted that there were points where someone attempting suicide could easily hide, and where the driver had limited visibility.

However, a 2010 study in the Netherlands, which has the highest rate of rail suicide in Europe, found no relation between the population density of the areas adjacent to the tracks over a 57-year period. (Note: A German driver who had experienced several suicides and began paying attention to the tracks ahead of his train as a result said, anecdotally, that tracks going through undeveloped land offered more risk of a suicide than those in residential areas; his experience otherwise comported with researchers' findings.) Instead, the Dutch researchers noted that suicides and attempts appeared to be concentrated on "hotspots", such as nearby psychiatric hospitals, a phenomenon also observed in the later Belgian study, as well as in Austria and Germany.

Three years later the same Dutch researchers undertook a comparative study of rail suicides in their country and neighboring Germany in the 2000–07 period, noting that despite many similarities the two countries differed where rail suicide was concerned—the Netherlands, despite a lower suicide rate overall, had a much higher incidence of rail suicide. Building on British research that found a correlation between the rail suicide rate and the overall passenger rail volume, suggesting that familiarity with rail transport might drive rail suicide to a greater extent than the mere availability of tracks, they identified four factors to use for comparative purposes using Poisson regression:

- population density,
- rail density, or the ratio between overall track length outside of privately owned enclosures and the country's land area;
- train traffic intensity, the ratio between annual train-kilometres and overall track length,
- passenger traffic intensity, the ratio between annual passenger-kilometres and the overall population of the country.

The second and third were posed as measures of the availability hypothesis; the fourth as a measure of familiarity. Rail density, when applied to suicide statistics, made the difference larger, which led the researchers to discount it as a factor due to the already extensively developed rail networks in both countries. (Note: The researchers suggested that at earlier stages of rail development there might be a measurable effect as had been noted in the late 19th century.) Train traffic intensity, by contrast, resulted in the two countries' rail suicide rates drawing almost even. The researchers considered this their most important finding, suggesting that with more frequent trains a potential suicide may have less time for second thoughts to manifest themselves. (Note: Population density had an even stronger effect in narrowing the gap, but as it cannot be controlled the researchers recommended targeting train traffic intensity for preventive measures instead.)

A 2006 German study of suicides on that country's rail network over 10 years that focused primarily on the relation between age groups and the overall suicide rate also looked at the locations chosen and the overall size of the rail network, which decreased by 5,000 km (3,100 mi) during the study period. It found that among rail suicides under 65, whose rate remained steady over the study period instead of declining as older suicides and the overall rate did, the rate also declined along with train-km and passenger-km. But it increased as the total trackage declined, as did a preference for using open track.

A 2015 Swedish study of suicide on the Stockholm Metro found that stations in areas with high rates of drug-related crime had higher suicide rates. In 2016 a Belgian study looked at regional variations in the rail suicide rate within the country over a five-year period. Paradoxically, poorer areas, like the center of Brussels, that had higher overall suicide rates had rail suicide rates below the national average, (Note: The authors qualified this finding by noting that in urban areas tracks may be less accessible.) while more affluent West Flanders's lower overall suicide rate included the highest rail suicide rate in the country.

=== Specific locations at and near stations and crossings ===
A 2023 German study looked at the specific behaviors of 56 rail suicides and attempts in that country over 18 months in 2020–21, where video from CCTV could be reviewed. The majority (42, or 75%) occurred at Deutsche Bahn stations, the rest were on open tracks. (Note: This is consistent with an earlier German study based on online questionnaires completed by police officers which found two-thirds of suicides occurring at stations.) The 2008 Queensland study, by contrast, found nearly the inverse ratio.

The German researchers broke down the suicides and attempts that occurred at stations by several factors determinable from the videos in 35 cases. The most prominent was the section of the platform from which the suicide or attempt occurred. A majority (20, or 57%) leapt from the end of the platform where the train approached, (Note: The earlier German study based on police officers' experiences (referenced in the previous endnote) found 70% of those suicides who jumped from the platform as the train entered the station did so from the end where it arrived, reinforcing a 1994 study of suicides on the London Underground that found most occurred from the first third of the platform.) seven (20%) used the middle and another eight (22.9%) chose the far end, suggesting that the train struck them at high speed. Over a third chose areas where no one else on the platform was near them at the time.

=== Suicide on urban-suburban mass transit rail systems ===
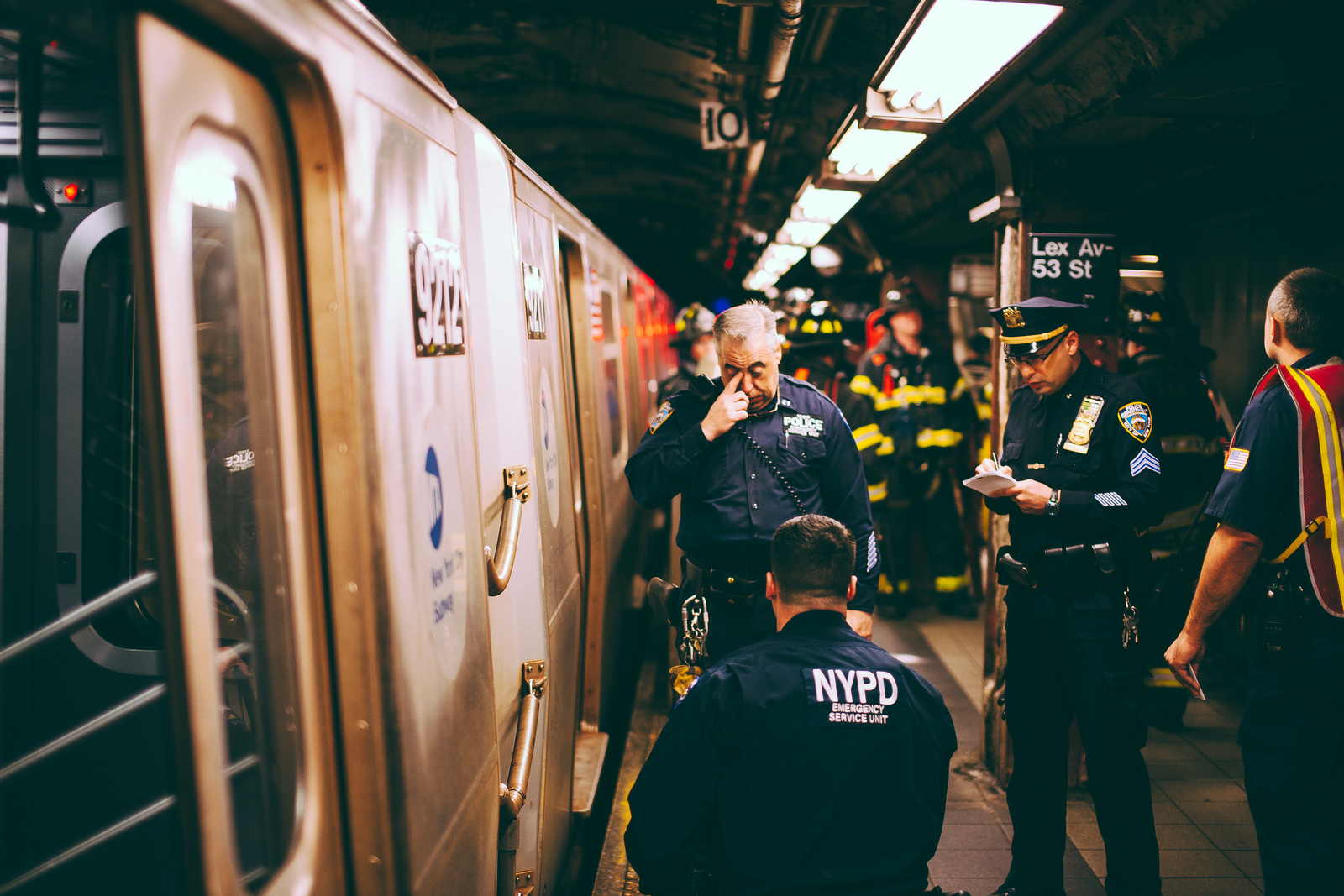
Subway suicide aftermath, E train on 51st/53rd, New York

Researchers have noted some differences in suicides on urban heavy-rail mass transit systems, more commonly known as subway or metro suicide. Structurally, since many run underground or on elevated tracks, often fenced off due to the presence of exposed third rails, the only access to tracks is at stations, where trains arrive at higher speeds, increasing the attraction for suicides. Half of the suicide victims on the London Underground studied by one paper had jumped in front of the train from within 50 ft (15 m) of where the train reached the platform. Similarly 87% of the suicides on the system occurred at stations. Demographically, such systems are located in large cities and suburbs, with higher population densities.

Metros/subways offer suicides the additional possibility of the third rail with its high voltage electric current to complete their suicides, especially if the train should be able to stop or slow down before striking them. A Toronto operator recalled once seeing a man lying across the tracks at the far end of the station as he entered, and quickly pressing the brakes. He believed he had prevented the suicide, but then saw that the man had touched the third rail. Similar incidents have been reported on the Kolkata Metro in India, where autopsies of many completed suicides show signs of electrocution in addition to the severe blunt force trauma caused by the train.

A 2007 Canadian review of the literature on metro/subway suicide found some differences to rail suicide as a whole, complicated slightly by different definitions of suicide used in different jurisdictions. An Austrian researcher found a high correlation between suicide rates and passenger volume through records at one station, similar to that found by researchers looking at the London Underground. In Toronto this was further found to correlate with transfer stations due to their higher volume, with research in Vienna finding terminal stations to have a lower rate. Rates of suicide on metros/subways also, like rail suicide generally, were resistant to declines in the overall suicide rate.

The studies did show some distinctive statistics. Metro/subway suicides were, while still predominantly men, less disproportionately so. Victims were also younger than most younger rail suicides, except in Tokyo where the largest share was in their 50s. An even higher propensity for mental illness was found, with 86% of the suicides in the Montreal Metro having had at least one past diagnosis. As with rail suicide generally, stations with nearby psychiatric treatment facilities evinced higher suicide rates.

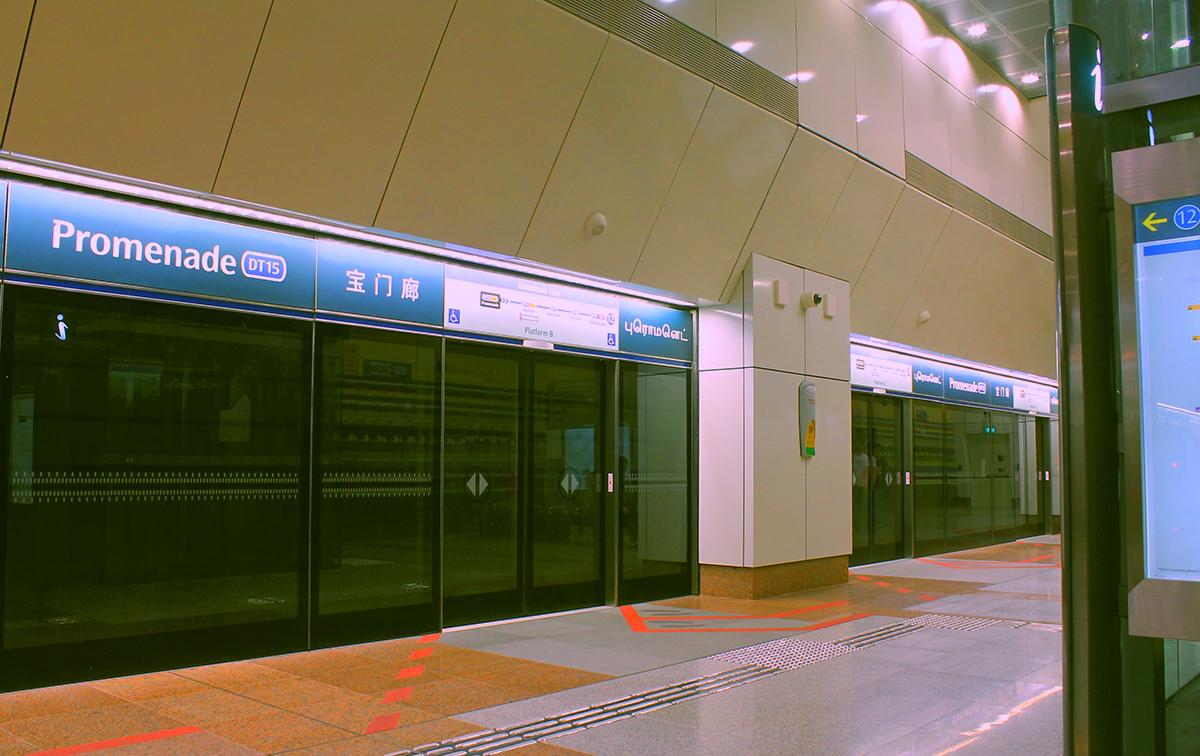
Platform screen doors on Singapore's MRT

Metro/subway suicides offer some prevention methods that might be impractical on rail systems generally, but have proven highly effective when and where they can be used. Drainage pits a meter (3 ft) deep between the rails on some portions of the London Underground, while not designed for suicide prevention, have helped enough attempters survive to have become known as "suicide pits". On other systems, particularly in Asia, platform doors have proven so effective in blocking access to the track that Singapore has reported no suicides on its MRT.

== Time patterns ==
Research has not consistently established any patterns related to the times of the day, week or year in which rail suicide is more common. The 2008 Queensland study found peaks in March–May and September–October, periods accounting for half of the 161 completed suicides over 15 years in the researchers' data set. June accounted for only nine, but they did not find that statistically significant. While there were differences in the weekdays chosen, again they did not reach statistical significance. However, patterns in the time of day showed a preference for late afternoon and early evening, with a third of cases occurring between 5 and 9 p.m. A 2014 German study that compared suicides during two separate periods, one before and the other after a prevention programme was implemented, found that even though the latter showed a drop attributable to the programme the patterns in time of day and day of the week chosen did not change.

The 2011 German researchers attempted to see if any temporal patterns presented in the 1,004 suicides they analyzed by jumping, lying or walking. The first of those methods was more common during the day at stations; the others at night. (Note: During the five years from which the data were drawn, rail suicides declined, but jumping at a greater rate.) The researchers theorized that night might provide more concealment for those venturing onto the track from a station or crossing before the train came, while jumping might be harder in the dark. Data on seasonal variation did not show any significant variation The Toronto subway system reports that most suicides there occur during the daytime, peaking around midday.

The 2015 Stockholm Metro study found as well that suicides peaked in the later afternoon, and in springtime, but could not find any day of the week that seemed particularly attractive to suicides. The authors noted the contrast with other studies that had, such as a 2004 German study of 4,003 rail suicides over five years, breaking them down by sex, which had found more occurring on Mondays and Tuesdays. Rail suicides peaked during April and September. In the summer months women showed a preference for the morning while men peaked in the evening, which the researchers theorized might be due to men taking greater care to make sure they completed their suicides. The interval between the peaks widened in the summer months. A 2020 Polish study of 60 rail suicides in the Warsaw area examining the relationship between alcohol use, sex and age among them found that sober victims predominated among those occurring in the fall while those who had been drinking were more likely to take their own lives via rail in the spring.

The Canadian study also took note of the weather. Rail suicides mostly occurred during milder weather, suggesting to the authors that inclement weather may discourage those considering suicide from going out and making attempts.

== Behavioral indications ==
Railway-related suicides are rarely impulsive, and this view has led to research on behaviour analysis using CCTV at known hotspots to see what might indicate a traveler is considering suicide. Some behaviour patterns are implicated such as station-hopping, platform switching, standing away from others, letting a number of trains go by, and standing close to where trains enter. Surveillance cameras are viewable by railway staff.

A 2011 German study made online questionnaires available to Federal Police officers who had witnessed, or interviewed witnesses to, rail suicides. From the 202 that were completed, the researchers identified several frequent behaviors of those considering suicide in stations. The most common was dropping personal belongings such as bags, suicide notes or identity cards, and avoiding eye contact, reported by half the respondents. A quarter recounted erratic behaviour, such as talking loudly to themselves and general confusion. Intoxication was reported by 20%, a proportion lower than the researchers expected based on another previous study, and 15% said that the suicide was seen wandering around. These phenomena were similar to those observed in a study of suicides on the Hong Kong MTR.

== Reasons for choosing ==
One British study that interviewed 20 survivors of rail suicide attempts found that almost half had chosen that method because they knew of someone else who had; they also perceived it as likely to be fatal while easily available and accessible. A later British study interviewed 34 people in three categories: survivors of rail suicide attempts, those who had attempted suicide by other means but considered trains, and those who had not attempted suicide but contemplated doing so by rail. It quoted their own words extensively, without "interpreting such accounts through a lens of deficit and pathology".

"A quick, violent death is quite attractive", one rail suicide survivor told the researchers in the later study. "I think that's one thing that you hope that a train can provide." Another informant, from the group that had considered suicide by train but not attempted any method, said that since it was likely no identifiable remains would be found their survivors would better be able to accept the finality of their death. Two rail suicide survivors also liked the "sense of anonymity" they had at stations. "I'd want to do it somewhere privately," one allowed. "It's not the sort of thing you want to do in front of everybody for a show". The impact on any witnesses, particularly the driver, was also a consideration. One survivor recalled feeling "desperately sorry" for that person, and another said that was the reason they ultimately chose another method, "because that's making somebody else complicit, so that's almost making them feel as if they'd killed me." (Note: Two informants both recalled aborting suicide attempts at train stations after becoming aware of the presence of children.) Another deterrent was the possibility of surviving the attempt and living with any permanent injuries.

Some survivors chose trains as a metaphor for their own situation:

[They] spoke of there being no alternative, no choice, others that suicide was a response to feeling out of control, or of taking the control that had been removed from them by mental health services. Several accounts implied a wish for agency to come from elsewhere, and in some the person described putting themselves in a situation where their fate would be left to chance, to impulse, or to people around who might or might not intervene

Another expressed the hope that their death might have been seen as an accident.

== Consequences ==
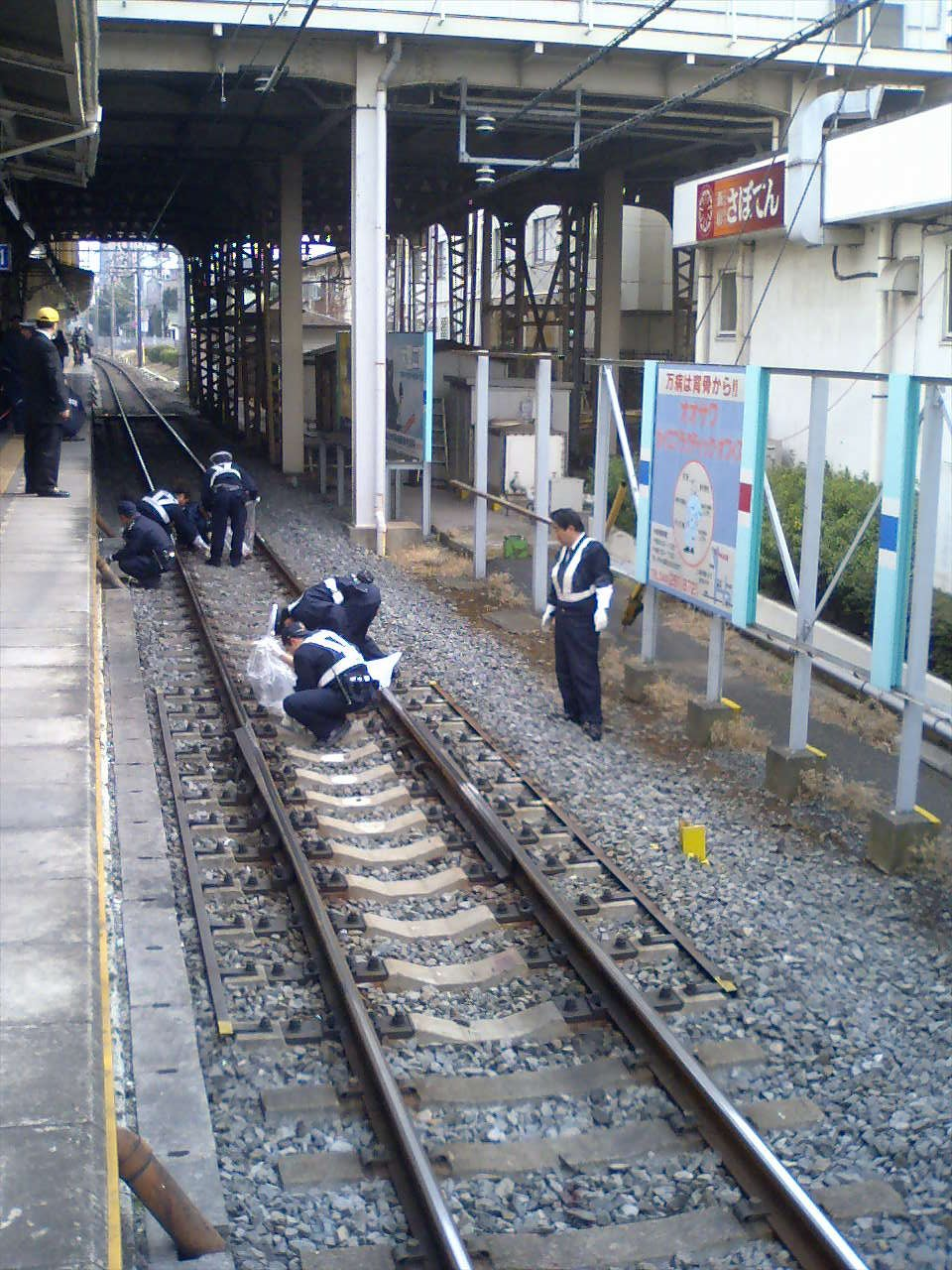
Police officers removing remaining debris following a suicide approximately an hour earlier on the down track at Kamifukuoka Station in Japan

Approximately 10–30%, depending on the method chosen, of those who attempt rail suicide survive the collision. Among documented rail suicide attempts in Germany from 1997 to 2002, there were more survivals where the attempter was female and the attempt was made at a station, on a lower-speed line, or during the daytime. Those who do not die at the scene often arrive at hospital with internal organ damage and severe haemorrhaging that can ultimately prove fatal. Survivors often suffer severed limbs, brain damage and chronic pain.

Rail suicide is distinct from most other methods in having a wide effect in order to investigate the death and clear the tracks, forcing delays and reroutings of trains in the meantime. As of 2014, the delay of the train caused by a rail suicide can extend from 30 minutes in Japan to two hours in most European countries. On the Toronto subway, it takes an average of an hour to clear the suicide's body off the tracks; it is sometimes necessary to uncouple cars or move entire trains.

A 2012 Belgian study put the annual costs to Infrabel, the country's rail operator, at 750 hours and €300,000 based on the 2006–2008 period. In the neighboring Netherlands, one railway suicide incident results in €100,000 of direct economic costs for carrier and railway manager together. In written testimony to the British Parliament, Samaritans said that in 2014–15 suicides cost Network Rail £67 million, (Note: In 2014, UK railways reported £34m of annual loss due to rail suicides.) averaging about £230,000 per incident, with 2,200 minutes of delays per incident adding up to 609,000 annually. In 2024, the Rail Delivery Group said those figures had fallen to 1,500 per suicide (with some extreme incidents causing 10 times that amount) and 400,000 per year. It noted that an incident in the south of England can have effects as far away as Scotland. (Note: This can be considered by suicides themselves. In December 2018, music journalist David Cavanagh wrote in a suicide note prior to jumping into the path of a train at a British station that he had originally planned to take his own life that way before Christmas, but chose to do it afterwards instead to avoid inconveniencing holiday travellers.)

Belgian law requires that the family of a suicide compensate the railway for the costs incurred, including repairs to damaged trains. Of the €2 million suicides cost the country's railways between 2013 and 2015, averaging €8,500 per incident, roughly one-third was recovered from families. Families can also be sued by affected drivers. Most of the costs are covered by insurance. Western newspapers have reported that the same law exists in Japan, but Japanese outlets consider this an "urban legend". The Japan Times found cases where railways had sued families to recover the costs of pedestrian deaths that may have been accidental, but no cases where the family of a suicide had been sued. In Germany, rail suicide is a criminal offence and can be prosecuted in case of survival.

=== Effect on drivers ===
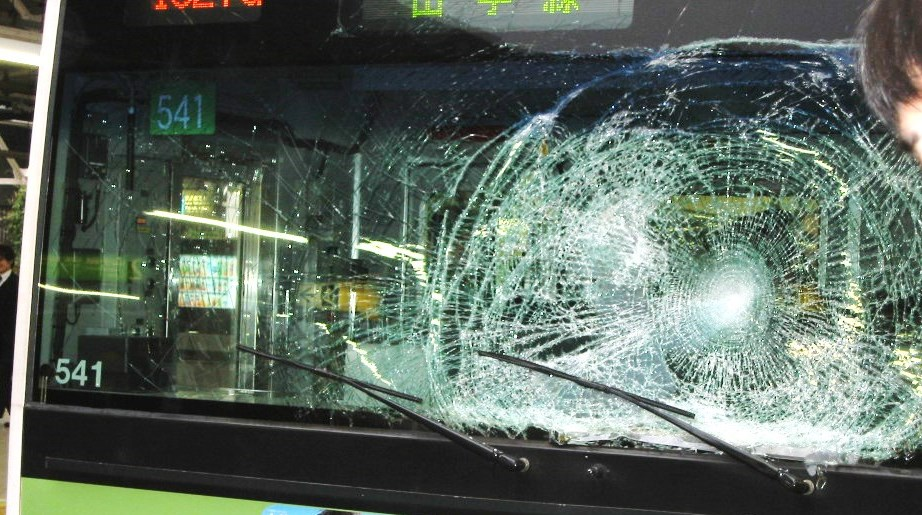
Smashed windscreen of a Japanese train after a person attempting suicide jumped in front of it

Even if the suicide situation is recognized at an early stage, the train driver is rarely able to prevent it due to the long braking distance and the inability to take evasive action. (Note: In case of driverless trains, a witnessing passenger presses the emergency button to stop the train.) (Note: In some cases, a collision with a pedestrian is not noticed by the train driver and the train continues to travel to the next station with human remains still visible at its front. In such cases, the driver might be held accountable for violation of instruction and face consequences.) A German train with an 80-tonne (88-short-ton) locomotive traveling at 120 km/h (75 mph) takes 600 m (2,000 ft), and 18 seconds, to stop, more than enough time for drivers to make eye contact with a person on the tracks. The country's high-speed Inter-City Express trains take 3 km (1.9 mi) to come to a complete stop.

Even if the train driver closes their eyes, they can still feel the impact force and vibration of the collision and hear the sounds, which one American driver likens to "hitting a pumpkin". German drivers say that standing humans are particularly loud. The ensuing heavy psychological burden for the driver can lead to years of impairment. A British driver who struck eight suicides during 23 years on the job said in 2018, almost 20 years after retiring early due to the mental health issues those incidents led to, that on particularly difficult days he consumes as much as 10 pints of beer and 60 cigarettes. He sleeps with the light on to avoid flashbacks.

"It's not a matter of if you are going to kill someone, but when", says one driver for the American goods carrier CSX. "And when it happens, you're totally helpless." He recalled having previously worked for another railway in a different area when a woman stood on the tracks in front of his train, giving him the finger in response to his repeated soundings of the train horn as the locomotive struck her. "You never forget something like that," he said. "If she wanted to kill herself, why did she have to involve me?" The memory of the incident led him to change employers. Other drivers whose trains had struck suicides had similarly vivid memories of those events many years later.

Drivers often suffer post-traumatic stress disorder (PTSD), exhibiting symptoms such as sleeplessness, irritability, depression, anger, panic attacks, nightmares and flashbacks. (Note: A German graduate student found that PTSD among train drivers who had experienced suicides was twice as common as those in other professions who had also witnessed deaths in the course of their work, such as bank clerks who had been held hostage during a robbery.) One recalls having only slept three hours in the three days after his train struck a pedestrian. "I was just doing my job, and this person decided to take his life, and as a result he took away my control", recalled a Toronto subway driver. "I have to work really hard now at things, to feel safe, to feel calm." Her husband, also a driver who months earlier had struck a suicide, was more forgiving: "I don't think anyone who commits suicide on the subway is out to get the train operators. They just want their pain to stop."

It is not uncommon for affected drivers to turn to alcohol, complicating their situation and possible return to work; some choose to leave the industry entirely. "You're generally the last one to see that person alive, and you're not prepared mentally or emotionally to see something like that," says John Tolman, an official with the Brotherhood of Locomotive Engineers and Trainmen, a U.S. railworkers union which has in conjunction with railroads been offering peer counseling and other support services for affected drivers. Among other things they are advised to do are to neither look at the body of the victim (Note: One German driver recalled hearing from colleagues that they draw the blinds when they see a person on the tracks ahead.) nor learn much about their lives. Bruno Kall, a German psychiatrist who specialises in treating traumatised drivers, says when a driver makes eye contact, "[he] then believes that he was chosen by the suicide victim." In 2013, according to Deutsche Bahn, 30 train drivers had to leave that job due to traumatic events. Since 2014, German drivers who cannot work due to witnessing a rail suicide are paid full salaries.

In Britain, Samaritans report that most of the costs associated with suicides are sick leave and replacement employees for drivers and others affected. One participant in the British study that interviewed survivors and those who had seriously considered suicide by rail ultimately chose another method because of concerns about the driver's feelings: "... that's making somebody else complicit, so that's almost making them feel as if they'd killed me."

=== Effects on the general public ===
In addition to the train driver, a rail suicide can traumatise a greater number of bystanders who witness the body. Staff working in the station may similarly no longer want to work at the station, or consider leaving the rail industry. Passengers may decide not to travel by train anywhere again and use other means of transport. Local communities around stations known for suicidal incidents may see their reputations suffer to the point that people may no longer want to live or work there. In 2000, it was reported that house prices along the Chūō Line near Tokyo had decreased at a greater rate compared with other areas of Japan due to the high number of suicides along it.

== Demographics ==
Rail suicides, like suicides in general and those using similarly violent methods, are mostly attempted and completed by men. (Note: An Australian study noted, however, that women who attempt rail suicide are more likely to die.) A 2013 U.S. Federal Railroad Administration (FRA) study using psychiatric autopsies found that the median age of the 55 suicides studied over a three-year period was 40. (Note: The suicides skewed younger, but after a chi-squared test the authors discounted that as an artifact created by the low sample size.) The 2008 Queensland study found a peak among men in the 15–24 age group, who accounted for nearly a third of its suicides. The 2006 German study of 10 years of rail suicides also found a greater portion of them under 65 as compared to the overall suicide rate. It also found that while rail suicides over 65 declined as the overall suicide rate did, younger rail suicides remained constant enough for the rail suicide rate to remain relatively stable compared to the overall suicide rate, accounting for an increasing portion of all suicides during the latter portion of the study period when the overall rate went down.

The suicides the FRA studied differed from suicides in general in showing a higher rate of diagnosed mental illness—96%—in rail suicides, a finding comparable to one reported in an earlier Dutch study in which two-thirds of the suicides studied were psychiatric inpatients. (Note: A later German study that chose rail suicides to better homogenize its analysis of predictors of suicides among psychiatric inpatients suggested that the regular sound of trains passing near facilities may help suggest the idea. In 2010 a Dutch paper further reported that inpatients chose rail suicide twice as often as outpatients; similarly the 2008 Queensland study noted that ten of the suicides were completed by mental inpatients who had absconded from their institutions ("Suicide in this group of people should constitute a very preventable outcome") and that in 22 cases a mental institution was within 500 m (1,600 ft) of the location of the suicide. This has led to recommendations that psychiatric facilities be located 3–5 kilometres (1.9–3.1 mi) from the nearest accessible train station, and that patients suffering depressive disorders not be allowed easy access to rail.) Comorbidity was reported in 73% of cases, 63% had a family history of mental illness, and 53% had been prescribed medication. Chronic physical illnesses were also reported in 51%. Almost all had recently experienced, or were experiencing, a stressful event such as legal difficulties and/or the end of a relationship.

Many were also reported to have been abusing drugs or alcohol during the time prior to their suicide, and autopsies showed that half had recently consumed those substances at the time of their suicides (with all but one of those who had been drinking having a blood alcohol content (BAC) over 0.08%, high enough to be considered legally intoxicated (five had recently been arrested on drunken-driving charges)). The 2008 Queensland study found as well that, in cases where a toxicology report had been done as part of the autopsy, half of the 15–24-aged males in their peak demographic had been drinking before the suicide. The 2020 Polish study looking at alcohol use and rail suicide found statistical significance among men, with younger victims more likely to have been drinking before the suicide than older ones. However, the older victims who had been drinking showed higher BACs at the time of their deaths, suggesting a correlation between greater suicide risk and longterm alcohol abuse.

Interviewers in the FRA study also asked the relatives of the suicides if they knew whether the suicide had access to a firearm and ammunition, the most common method of suicide in the U.S., accounting for half of all cases. They learned that 22% of the cases did. While the authors noted that it was unusual for gun owners who kill themselves to use other means, since that was lower than the share of American households with firearms they theorized that rail may be more attractive to suicides for whom guns are not available. In Switzerland, a 2013 study analyzed the effect on suicide rates among young men of "Army XXI", a reform of the country's army a decade earlier which, while not intended to do so, reduced the amount of firearms, a more common method of suicide there than elsewhere in Europe, among the population. (Note: It halved the overall size of the army, lowered the discharge age and raised the fee for purchasing the military-issue weapon upon discharge.) It found that while the rate of firearm suicides declined significantly along with the overall suicide rate, the rate of rail suicide increased among young men while other violent methods did not, partly offsetting the decline in the overall rate.

A 2018 study of suicides on the Melbourne rail system in the Australian state of Victoria, which has the highest rate of rail suicide of any state in that country, found two factors which distinguished rail suicides from all suicides. First, they were three times as likely to never have been married. Second, they were more likely to live in areas where a large segment of the population commuted to their jobs via rail, offering support for Durkheim's theory that suicides lean toward using a method familiar to them from their everyday life. The researchers speculated that perhaps married people are more likely to have children and commute to work by car.

Another Dutch study, in 2024, employed the psychiatric-autopsy technique to study 39 rail suicides over a four-year period. They were found to be predominantly under the age of 30, at a proportion twice that of the general suicide rate for that age group in the Netherlands. Many were well educated and lived with others, either friends or family, in neighborhoods within walking distance of where they took their lives.

== Epidemiology ==
=== Australia ===
In Queensland, rail suicides accounted for 2% of all suicides in the period 1990-2004.

=== Canada ===
As of 1996, 3% of suicides in Canada were committed on railways.

=== Europe ===
Data gathered from 2006 to 2023 showed that there were about 2,500 suicides and 800 trespass-related injuries on the European railways each year.

ERA	EU^{[Note 1]}	AT	BE	BG	CH	CZ	DE	DK	EE	EL	ES	FI	FR	HR	HU	IE	IT	LT	LU	LV	NL	NO	PL	PT	RO	SE	SI	SK
Rail suicides in 2006	1647	78	97	32		174		21		1	189	42	351		128	7	126	0		6	190	11	25	40	16	69	6	49
Rail suicides in 2007	2425	113	94	39		150	706	32	0	4	188	54	344		111	5	138	0		10	193	8	28	52	24	78	14	48
Rail suicides in 2008	2220	93		27		160	714	24	1	1	174	52	289		111	7	137	0		9	164	7	29	50	29	71	20	58
Rail suicides in 2009	2563	101	69	19	121	185	875	32	0	3	163	62	337		139	2	111	2	4	10	197	8	25	69	25	67	10	56
Rail suicides in 2010	2538	90	84	18	126	198	899	23	0	2	124	44	328	19	121	6	109	4	3	13	201	7	47	51	23	68	15	48
Rail suicides in 2011	2687	87	98	27	103	235	853	20	0	4	128	64	332	28	155	6	140	5	7	10	215	11	28	42	76	62	25	40
Rail suicides in 2012	2734	80	102	33	140	224	872	32	5	1	138	32	356	24	148	5	124	13	5	7	202	8	80	58	57	82	16	38
Rail suicides in 2013	2552	99	94	17	140	207	834	23	1	5	118	55	291	15	79	3	134	8	4	3	220	10	71	47	66	90	13	55
Rail suicides in 2014	2608	92	97	29	151	279	781	21	5	4	139	64	298	28	79	5	143	6	6	6	192	15	71	44	80	77	18	44
Rail suicides in 2015	2511	95	92	22	145	205	806	27	7	7	108	48	302	30	57	2	127	4	3	11	223	7	88	39	42	86	16	64
Rail suicides in 2016	2608	99	104	15	140	203	798	27	1	4	115	60	314	27	76	5	165	10	3	9	221	12	116	32	48	69	26	61
Rail suicides in 2017	2532	73	88	23	140	203	771	24	5	7	126	56	297	21	82	7	176	3	2	7	215	18	112	52	48	50	15	69
Rail suicides in 2018	2379	92	93	15	139	184	732	25	6	5	90	48	288	23	63	9	144	4	1	4	194	16	105	29	62	79	13	71
Rail suicides in 2019	2313	71	93	19	126	211	646	30	5	2	89	58	261	20	69	2	135	2	0	10	194	7	156	40	41	85	17	57
Rail suicides in 2020	2204	74	94	20	114	204	678	20	2	4	69	53	203	13	114	5	116	5	2	3	198	15	127	23	38	69	16	54
Rail suicides in 2021	2234	75	88	11	127	161	678	19	9	1	71	35	243	19	121	4	132	4	0	5	186	10	138	33	42	83	24	52
Rail suicides in 2022	2401	101	106	14	105	214	684	16	4	0	87	52	240	22	85	6	129	6	5	7	210	12	183	29	42	60	22	77
Rail suicides in 2023	2370	93	102	13	117	195	690	15	6	2	98	49	265	18	84	7	155	0	2	7	190	15	128	35	51	78	17	70
ERA data for 2021																												
Rail suicides	2234	75	88	11	127	161	678	19	9	1	71	35	243	19	121	4	132	4	0	5	186	10	138	33	42	83	24	52
Rail suicide attempts	347	11	13	1	12	16	89	22	1	0	14	19	35	4	45	0	20	0	0	0	9	1	13	5	15	7	6	2
Unauthorized persons killed	405	6	5	11	4	11	64	3	0	1	10	2	22	3	27	1	42	8	1	5	2	0	99	9	54	4	0	15
Unauthorized persons seriously injured	190	9	0	7	14	28	39	2	1	4	7	0	18	2	6	0	18	3	0	5	1	1	25	2	2	3	0	8

^{Note 1} Only current EU member states counted

==== Czech Republic ====
As of 2019, approximately 35% of railway trespassing victims in the Czech Republic are suicides according to an estimate by the country's Rail Safety Inspection Office.

==== Germany ====
As according to STABAG (German: Statistik der Bahnbetriebsunfälle und Gefährlichen Unregelmäßigkeiten) in the years 1991–2000, 8653 (91.0%) rail suicide cases were fatal from a total of 9510 incidences which occurred on the German railway net. A fatal suicide meant a death within 30 days. Fatal rail suicides were ca. 7% of all fatal suicides committed in Germany in this time period. Of the 5731 suicidal acts in the time period 1997–2002, 66% occurred on open tracks and 34% in station areas. The data of 4127 suicial acts from the time period 2002-2006 showed that 32.2% of subjects were jumping, 32.6% lying and 34.2% wandering. Wandering included standing, and lying on the tracks included suicide by train decapitation. Jumping in front of the train had the highest chance of survival, while lying on the tracks most often resulted in death. However, suicidal behavior is not always detectable post mortem.

993 cases of total 4127 suicidal acts from the time period 2002-2006 were distributed as follow
Location	Jumping in front of the train	Lying on the track	Wandering along the track
open tracks (total 607)	143	231	233
station (total 386)	180	96	110

==== The Netherlands ====
In the Netherlands, approximately 10–14% of all suicides are by rail. Every year, roughly 200 suicides and 50 suicide attempts occur on Dutch railways.

=== Japan ===
In 1999, about 5% of total 33048 suicides in Japan were on train tracks. Shin-Koiwa Station in Tokyo has a very high frequency of suicides. There have been 13 incidents between 2011 and 2013 at this station.

=== United Kingdom ===
In 2014, there were 279 suicides on the national rail network per year. It was an increase of 11 on the previous year and 55 on 2011. Additionally, annually around 50 suicides on the London Underground were reported for 2014. There were more men among the victims than women, aged mostly between 30 and 55, mostly lower income persons. Suicides on the railways represent around 4% of the total.

ERA data for 2020 for the railway network	
Rail suicides	251
Rail suicide attempts	35
Unauthorized persons killed	8
Unauthorized persons seriously injured	2

=== United States ===
The U.S. FRA reports that there are 300 to 500 suicides by train each year. Those statistics have several caveats. First, they only represent the heavy surface rail system, as mass transit systems such as the New York City Subway are not required to report to the FRA. Second, until 2011 even those railroads were not required to report suicides to the FRA (although some did) as they were seen as voluntary acts that resulted from intent rather than indicating possible shortcomings in safety measures. They were also formerly instructed to report any deaths, from whatever cause, that occurred more than 24 hours after the incident as injuries, not fatalities. A Northwestern University economist notes that studies in both the US and UK have found, based on behaviour, that a substantial portion of trespass fatalities may actually have been suicides.

About 70 passenger rail systems in larger metropolitan areas, such as light rail, hybrid rail, streetcars, and cable car systems, report their incidents to a different regulatory authority, the Federal Transit Administration (FTA), requiring that researchers combine statistics from that agency with those kept by the FRA to get an accurate count. More than twice as many rail-related pedestrian fatalities in the US result from trespass incidents than in Europe. Since the railroads were required to report them, only 30% of those have been suicides, but that portion may actually be more than 50% due to deficiencies in reporting by the FRA and the railroads.

Rail suicides in United States
	2012	2013	2014	2015	2016	2017
Lower estimate of the total number of fatal incidents	276	314	276	328	275	219

In 2015, 328 fatal suicides and 30 suicide-related injuries were recorded on the US rail system.

== Prevention ==
Data from 2008 to 2018 may indicate that 30% of railway suicides in the Netherlands, approximately 85 suicides per year, could have been prevented by measures taken by ProRail, such as restricting access.

The U.S. FRA found that railways do not always publicise their suicide prevention efforts, although many have them. This can be both out of concern that doing so will alert possible suicides to the possibility of rail as a method, and fear that the public will be averse to rail travel if they associate it with the possibility of suicide. Those railways that do often put it in the context of promoting greater mental health awareness. In a report on suicide countermeasures, researchers for the agency suggested that if all the railways were more open about their efforts, they could learn from each other and improve their practices.

=== Journalistic practices ===
In the early 21st century researchers and government bodies began to focus on how coverage of suicides, generally, in the media might lead others to attempt it. Media reporting has been linked to increased rail suicide attempts through the Werther effect.

The catalyst was an effort in Austria, where a 1984–87 increase in suicides on the Vienna U-Bahn received sensationalistic coverage in the city's tabloid newspapers. After discussions with the newspapers' reporters and editors about how that might have been encouraging more suicides and attempts, the outlets agreed to sharply curtail their coverage, after which the suicide rate on the U-Bahn dropped significantly. From that experience, guidelines for reporting on suicide in a way less likely to inspire others to attempts were developed, both generally and specific to rail suicides.

Over 20 years later, a celebrity rail suicide also became an opportunity to examine and critique the role media coverage plays in suicide prevention. After the 2009 suicide of Robert Enke, a German association football goalkeeper considered a contender for the starting position on the national team in the next year's World Cup, suicides, particularly rail suicides, were reported to have significantly increased across the country. The Federal Statistical Office of Germany would not release data at the time, but after it did researchers later found that in the wake of Enke's death rates of rail suicide had increased much more than the overall suicide rate, in some cases more than doubling, not only in Germany but in some nearby countries.

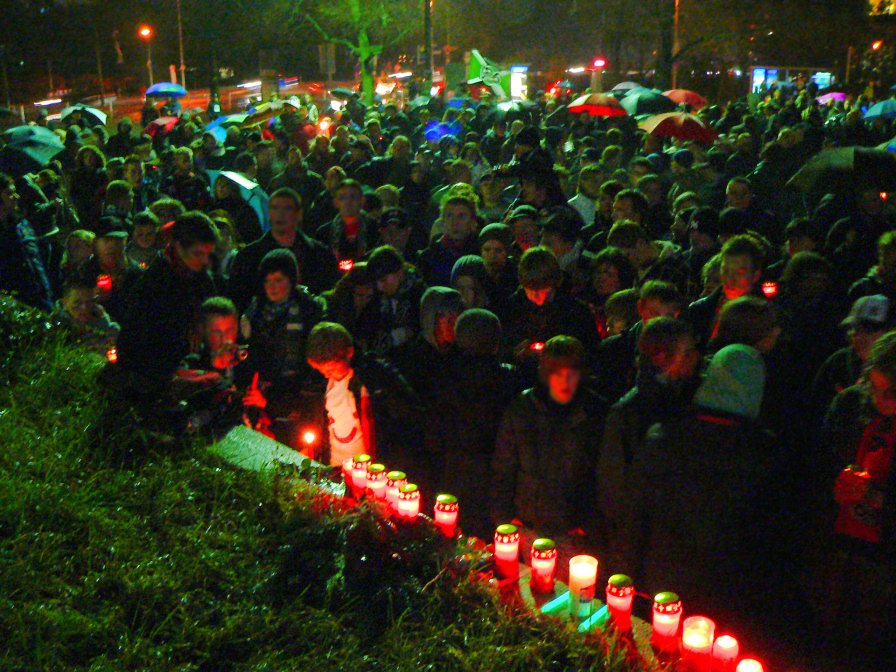
Fans grieving after Enke's suicide

Media coverage of Enke's death and its aftermath was intense, Süddeutsche Zeitung noted. Accounts of his suicide included details such as exactly where he had parked his car near the level crossing at which an express train struck him, the location of the crossing, and that he had stood in its path. In its wake fans and journalists debated whether a football setback with the national team was to blame, or Enke's despondency over the death of his young daughter from a heart defect three years earlier. Fans were shown grieving and leaving flowers at Niedersachsenstadion, where his club at the time of his death, Hannover 96, played its home games. Enke's former club, FC Barcelona, observed a moment of silence, as did several international matches in the days afterward. His memorial service at the stadium was broadcast live on several TV networks. All these could, the newspaper observed, quoting several researchers, encourage others with suicidal ideations to make them a reality.

In 2013 the John A. Volpe National Transportation Systems Center published a report for the FRA on nearly 1,200 news articles it found online about rail suicides and trespass incidents in the U.S. over the course of a year. It found several common practices that had been found to increase suicide contagion. Some were common to all reporting on suicides, such as the use of "suicide" in the headline, comments about an increase in such suicides, identifying the incident as a suicide without an official finding from police or coroners, and the depiction of grieving friends and families or memorials, the latter of which can suggest to a person considering suicide that they will stir similar emotions in their survivors. But some others were specific to rail suicides, and the Volpe Center has posted guidelines on its website. Articles about rail suicides and trespasses should not:

- give specific information (including a map) about where the suicide or trespass fatality occurred (i.e., distances to nearby stations or crossings, since that might lead someone to begin planning their own suicide at the same location);
- describe exactly how the suicide occurred (i.e., whether the victim jumped, stood or lay on the tracks) and what they had been doing just prior to the suicide (which also might make it easier for a potential suicide to formulate their own plans);
- show a picture of a train (again allowing a potential suicide to begin visualising the process);
- show pictures of police officers and/or railworkers standing near tracks (which can have the same effect as showing grieving loved ones).

The study also found that only 5% of the news articles surveyed included information on how those contemplating suicide could get help.

The FRA noted in 2019 that a few U.S. railroads had published guidelines for reporting on suicides, but most had not. While it understood that concerns about triggering copycat suicides were legitimate, it said "the ideal strategy is not to refrain from talking for fear of making the problem worse, but rather to learn how to discuss the topic responsibly."

=== Suicide prevention signs ===
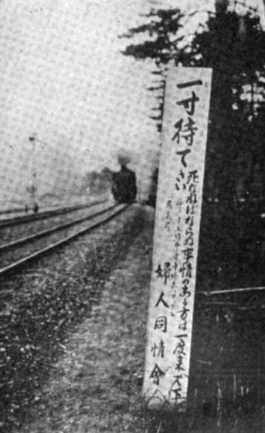
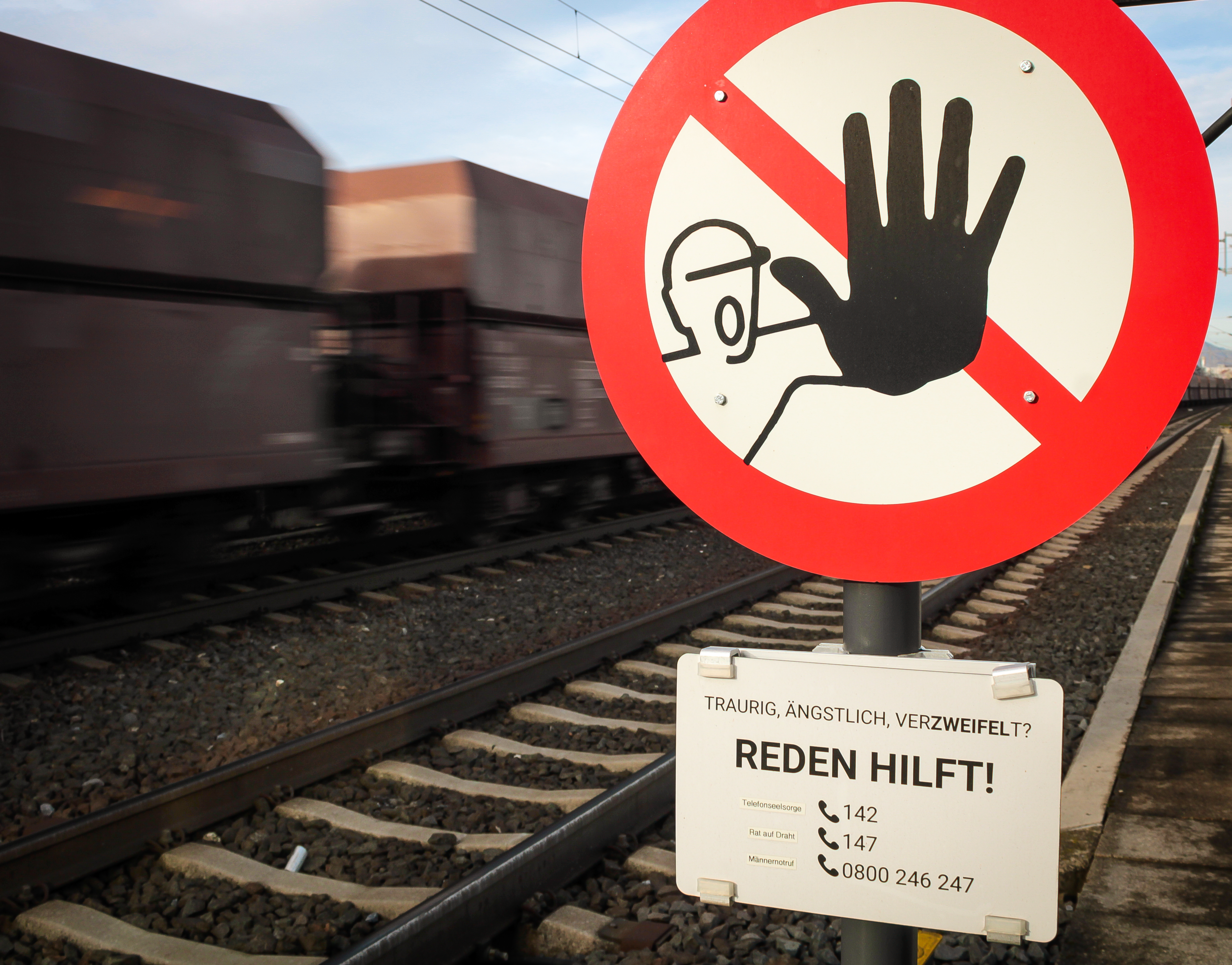
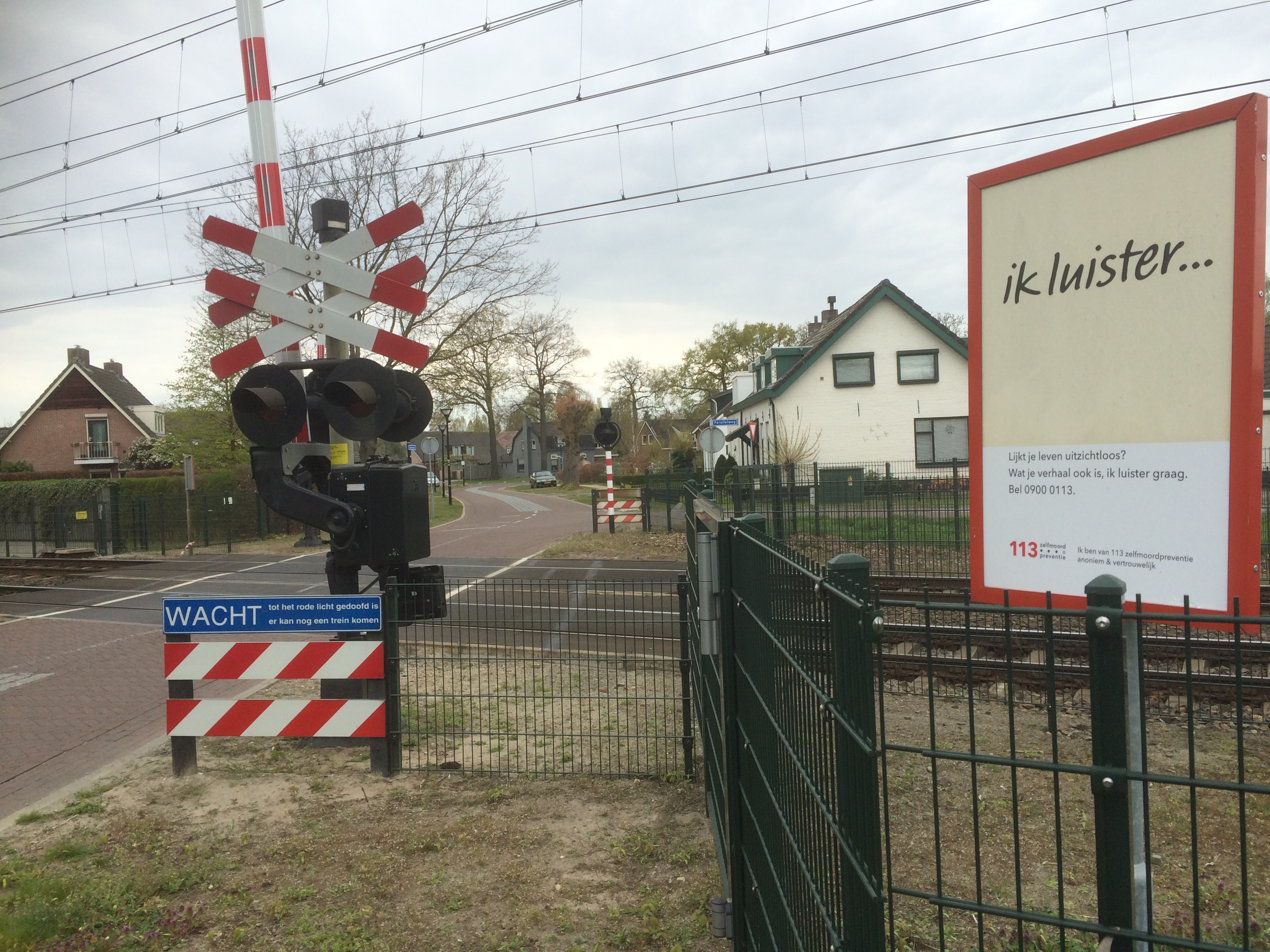
Suicide prevention signs. Clockwise: Nobu Jo's 1916 signs in Japan, a sign at an Austrian station and one at a Dutch crossing, the latter two with hotline numbers

Beginning in 1916 in Japan, suicide prevention activist Nobu Jo placed large, well-lit signs at train stations and bridges. They advised suicidal visitors to stop, to wait, and to visit Jo's home or office, if they were feeling desperate. Jo believed that many suicidal people in the city experienced stress, poor health, poverty, and social isolation, and that these underlying issues might be resolved or relieved without loss of life.

One of the preventive measures taken in the Netherlands was to place suicide prevention signs in high-risk locations, mentioning the suicide prevention hotline (113 Zelfmoordpreventie). That information may be of limited utility in prevention, at least in the US. Research by the FRA found that only 20 percent of rail suicides had their cell phone on them at the time, suggesting that it might be better to have a dedicated telephone at crossings and stations, although that risks being damaged by vandals. Signs with the dedicated 988 number (the North American version of 113) may still be of some efficacy in prevention as a significant portion of suicides had visited the station before, giving them the chance to call the hotline before their attempt.

In 2010, Caltrain placed signs with a helpline number along some of the stretch the FRA had studied after the Palo Alto cluster, a 16-kilometre (10 mi) section between Menlo Park and Mountain View. The signs were located not only at stations and crossings but also along fences and at gates to the right-of-way, no more than 0.1 miles (160 m) apart.

=== Access restriction ===
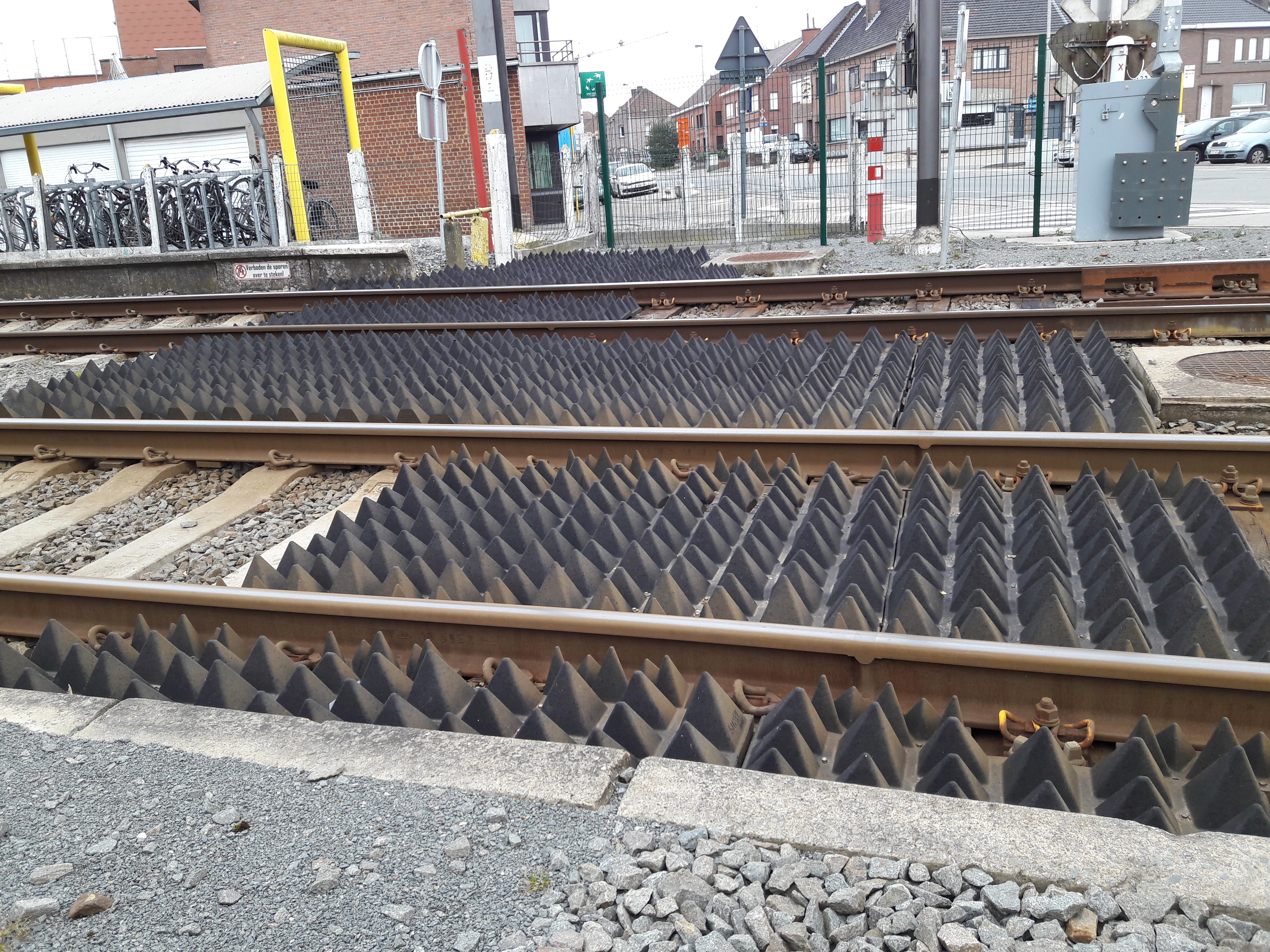
Anti-trespass panels at a Belgian level crossing next to a station

Physical barriers reducing the number of trespassers and suicides are barrier fences, intermediate fencing between tracks, anti-trespass panels and platform screen doors. In Sweden, the number of suicides at stations could be reduced by 62.5 per cent through mid-track fencing. Sometimes vegetation along the tracks can obscure the view of the train driver and the removal of this is also advocated. On the London Underground the presence of a platform drainage pit has been shown to halve the number of deaths from suicide attempts. The pit increases the clearance between the train and the ground, probably allowing a casualty to fall away from the train's wheels. In South Korea, platform screen doors reduced the number of suicides by 89 per cent.

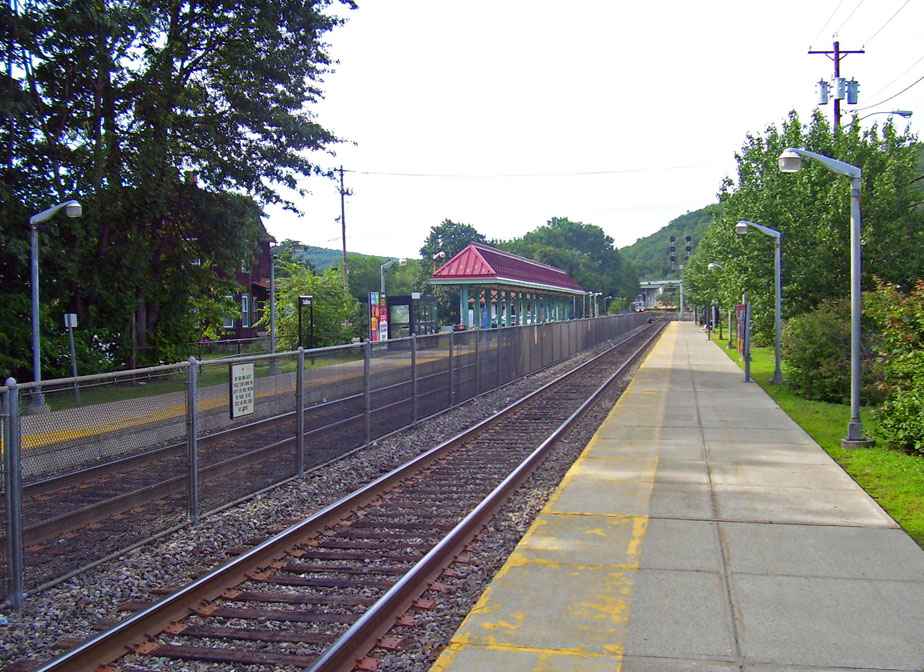
Fences between tracks at station in Suffern, New York, U.S.

Access restrictions such as these are primarily effective on metro or subway systems, with underground or elevated tracks in urban and suburban areas. On surface rail systems with long intercity lines it is seen as expensive and impractical to fence off the entire line. There is also doubt about their efficacy in the face of a suicide's resolve. "If someone is determined, what can you do? Absolutely nothing", says one American drivers' union official. Barrier skeptics also argue that those unable to attempt a rail suicide will instead choose another method. Suicidologists say this common belief is not true, that the personal crisis that leads someone to attempt suicide may pass in a short time if they can be prevented.

Other methods are also available to restrict and discourage access to tracks. Railways can plant vegetation along the edge of their rights-of-way that is dense and difficult to pass through, and may also have thorns or barbs that discourage even that attempt. Tracks that pass through cuts in the land also have steep sides that cannot be descended easily from adjacent lands.

=== CCTV cameras ===
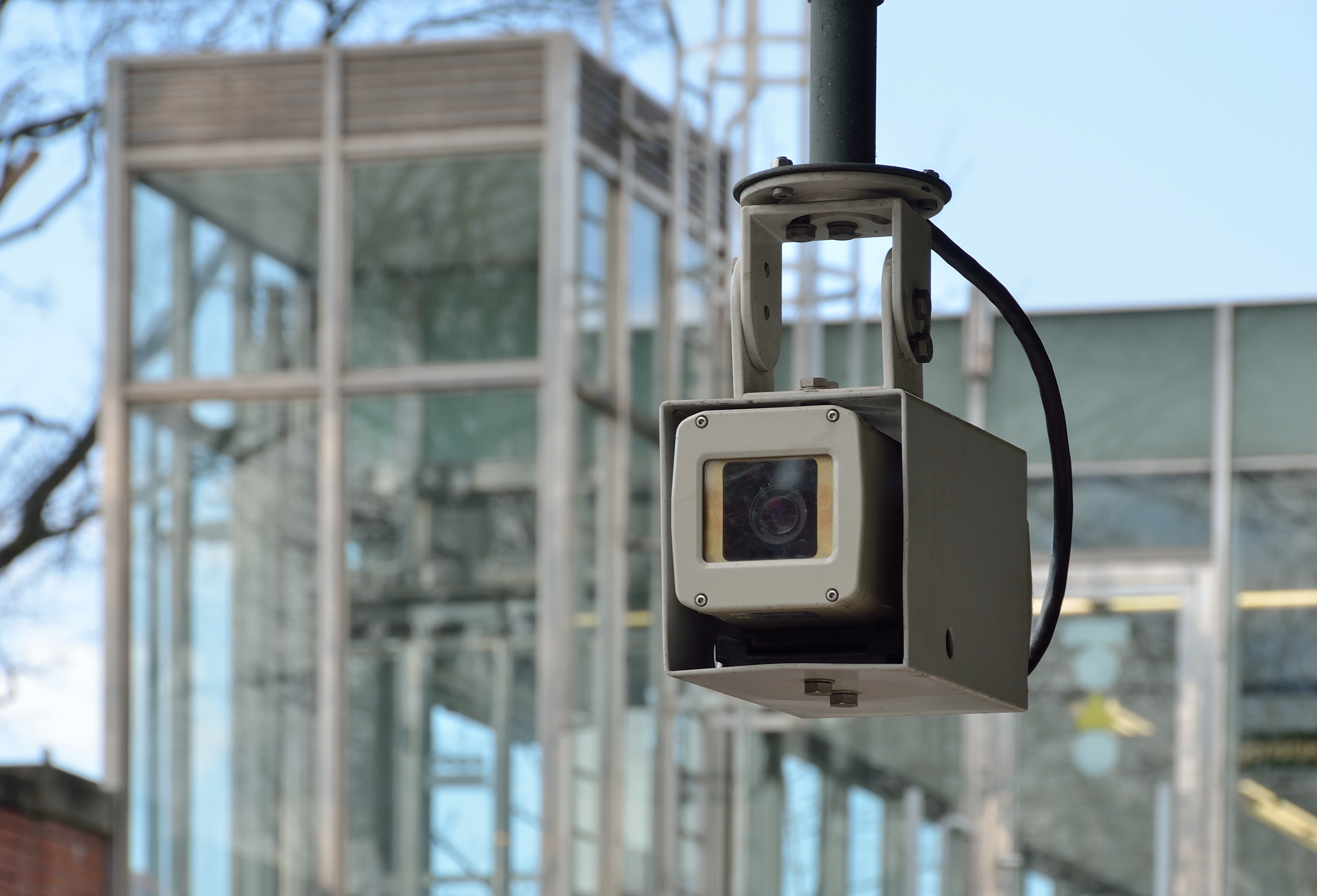
Security camera at a Vienna Metro station

CCTV cameras can be used to identify risk factors for suicide like certain behavior and face expression, to understand a suicide after an attempt for forensic needs, and to automatically intervene using computer vision. In Australia, human-monitored CCTV was found to reduce the number of suicides in metro stations. Computer vision enhanced CCTV sending alerts to staff are a matter of research. Lancaster University together with the company Purple Transform has been awarded £50,000 by Innovate UK's UK Research and Innovation to conduct a project entitled 'Suicide Avoidance via Intelligent Video Examination' (SAIVE) project. The goal is to investigate feasibility of AI surveillance systems for preventing rail suicides.

A program begun by the Toronto Transit Commission (TTC) in response to suicides on its subway system trains station staff to be alert for behavioural indicators of a possible suicide, whether seen in person or on camera. Some signs include wandering around without boarding any trains, crying, loitering at the end of the platform, removing clothing or not wearing shoes, or wearing hospital gowns. When they see these and report them to transit control, the next train to reach the station is given a slow order, so it enters at a pace no faster than a walk, (Note: In the U.S., Caltrain has a similar policy.) while staff approach the person and ask if they are considering suicide. Since its implementation in 2005, the rate of suicide on the subway has declined; the TTC believes it has prevented an average of five suicides a month.

Some U.S. railways have begun considering the possibility of supplementing CCTV monitoring of their outdoor tracks with drones. Florida's Tri-Rail announced in 2019 it had purchased some and hoped to implement them the following year. The Brunswick, Maine, police department was also preparing a drone program to watch over tracks in its jurisdiction.

=== Blue lights ===
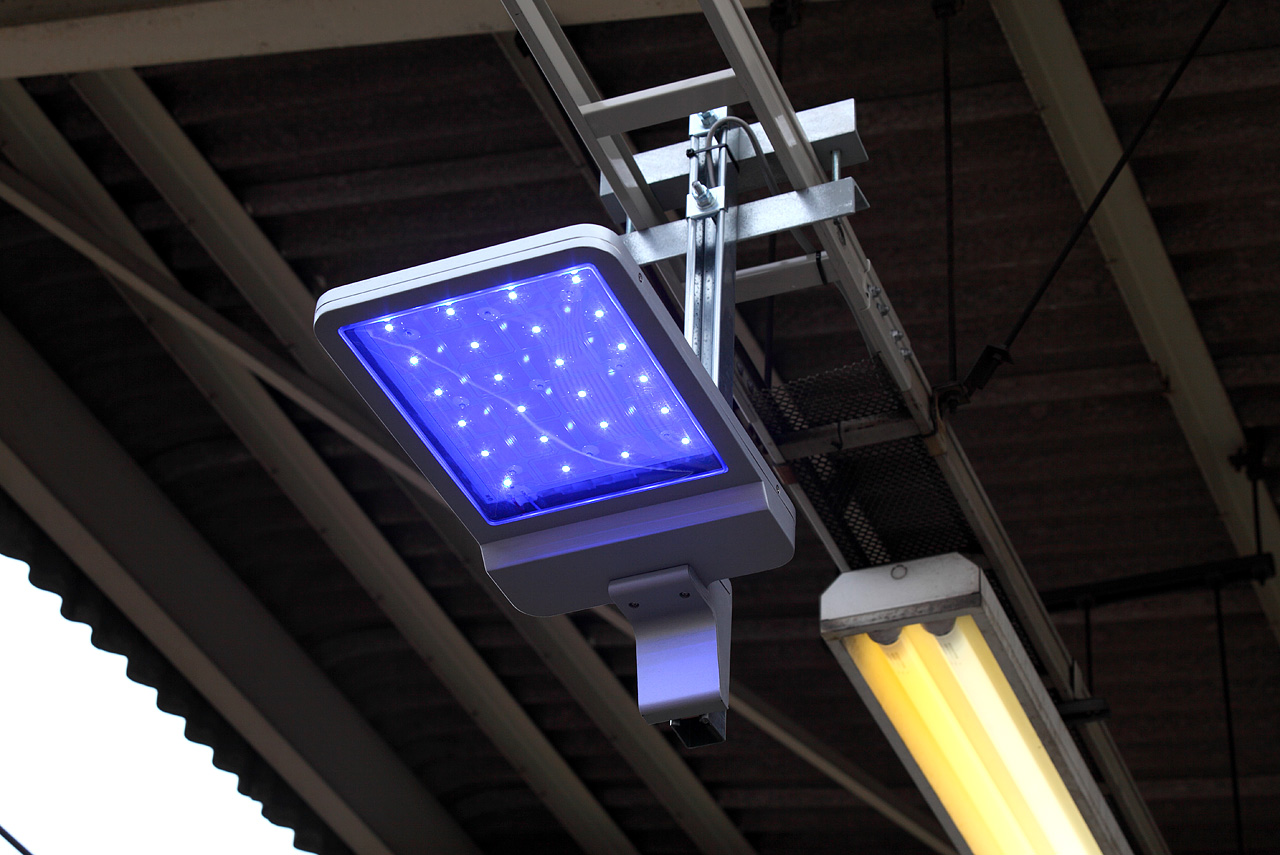
Blue suicide prevention light at a Japanese train station

In Japan, the use of calming blue lights on station platforms is estimated by one study to have resulted in a 74–84 percent overall reduction in suicide attempts. They are also often installed at crossings, which the West Japan Railway Company began doing in 2006. A 2014 study questioned this conclusion, finding in a review of 10 years worth of records on rail suicides in Japan that only 14 percent of suicides at stations took place at night, when the lights could be expected to have an effect. They called the earlier study "potentially misleading", noting that the researchers' news release announcing their results had failed to mention the 95 percent confidence interval. After adjusting for that, they said "the proportion of suicide attempts that is potentially preventable by blue lights should be less than our conservative estimate".

== In fiction ==
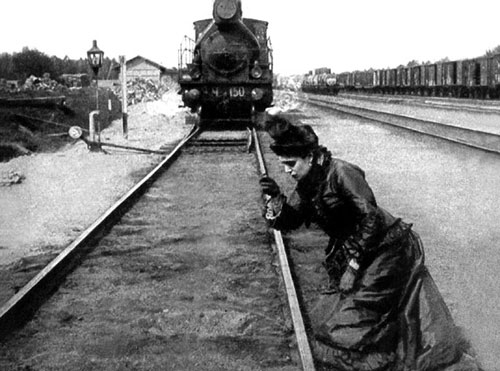
Maria Germanova as the title character in the 1914 Russian film adaptation of Anna Karenina

The title character of Leo Tolstoy's 1878 novel Anna Karenina, under the influence of morphine, trapped in a loveless marriage, believing her lover is himself having relationships with other women and may give in to his family's plans to arrange a marriage to one of them, kneels on the tracks as a train approaches. Similarly, Willa Cather's 1905 short story "Paul's Case" ends with its title character, having been unable to bring himself to shoot himself, walking onto a set of tracks and being struck by a train.

In the 1944 film Double Indemnity, the two main characters, Walter Neff and Phyllis Dietrichson, conspire to kill her husband and collect the large insurance settlement enabled by the title by making his death appear to have been an accidental fall from a moving train. The insurance company, Neff's employer, declines to pay on the belief that the death was a suicide. Barton Keyes, the claims adjuster believes it to be murder, citing suicide statistics he is familiar with in a ten-volume set that break down suicides by every possible category. "[O]f all the cases on record", Keyes says, "there's not one single case of suicide by leap from the rear end of a moving train." He also notes that the train was traveling at 15 mph (24 km/h) when the fall occurred, too slowly to cause serious injury or death to someone jumping or falling from it.

The 1956 Tom and Jerry short Blue Cat Blues starts with Tom Cat sitting on a railway, intending suicide by this method. After an inner monologue by Jerry Mouse recalling the financial and romantic troubles that led to Tom's suicidal ideation, Jerry finds himself in the same situation at the end of the short and decides to sit beside Tom as a train is heard approaching. Due to the prominence of suicide by train and the protagonists' implied demise, Blue Cat Blues is recognized as having some of the darkest subject matter in the franchise. The short has acquired a legacy as an example of shocking content in children's entertainment (despite animated theatrical shorts like Tom and Jerry not being marketed for children in the 1950s), and the misconception that it was or intended to be the final episode of the series during the original run under William Hanna and Joseph Barbera at the Metro-Goldwyn-Mayer cartoon studio.

The 1981 West German television series Tod eines Schülers ("Death of a Student") began with the title character jumping in front of an oncoming train. The scene was repeated at the beginning of every episode, as the story explored the aftermath of the suicide from different perspectives. Some research has suggested an increase in rail suicides took place for several months after the series aired.

After disrupting his class reunion at the beginning of the film, Yongho, the middle-aged protagonist of the 1999 South Korean film Peppermint Candy, climbs onto a nearby trestle where he refuses a fellow attendee's entreaties to come down. As a train approaches, he does not get out of the way and is last shown screaming "I want to go back!"; it is implied that he lets the train hit him. The film uses this as a departure point to show scenes from the previous 20 years of his life in reverse chronological order. Every different time period is preceded by a view of Yongho from the train, the footage running backward so he appears further away each time.

The 2008 British film Three and Out tells the story of Paul Callow, a driver on the London Underground who, after accidentally running over two people with his train, learns of a supposed rule that if his train strikes a third person within the month, he can retire and collect £10,000 in a lump sum payment. He then stops a man, Tommy Cassidy from jumping off the Holborn Viaduct and says he will pay him if he jumps in front of his train. Over a last weekend Paul promises Tommy, the latter attempts a reconciliation with his family as Paul begins to have second thoughts. Tommy insists the two follow through, and Paul ultimately does. Calling attention to the trauma suffered by drivers when their trains strike someone on the tracks, the Underground's driver's union, the Associated Society of Locomotive Engineers and Firemen, denounced the film and staged protests against it. Management publicly defended its cooperation with the filmmakers but privately the Underground's managing director Tim O'Toole had second thoughts in an internal memo, suggesting that it may have been a mistake to work with a film that "does not reflect reality and is in poor taste in attempting to make a suicide event 'funny'". Three and Out failed at the box office.

Films have depicted suicide on urban mass rail transit as well. In Oliver Stone's 2010 Wall Street: Money Never Sleeps, Louis Zabel jumps off a New York City subway platform into the path of an oncoming train after the trading firm he owns has suffered a catastrophic loss in value. The 2001 Japanese horror film Suicide Club begins with a scene where a group of 54 schoolgirls holding hands before they jump off a station platform into the path of an oncoming train, drenching the horrified other waiting passengers with their blood and beginning an epidemic of mass suicides around the country which a police detective attempts to solve. The scene is echoed in 2023's Bird Box Barcelona, where passengers on an underground platform, under the influence of mysterious unseen creatures, descend to the tracks and walk into the path of an oncoming train.

On stage, British playwright Kieran Knowles's 2017 31 Hours follows four railway trackworkers around dealing with the aftermath of a suicide. The play takes its title from the average length of time between suicide attempts on the British railway network.

== See also ==
- Train surfing

== Works cited ==
- Berman, Alan; Sundararaman, Ramaya; Price, Andrea; Marshall, Karen; Martino, Michael; Doucette, Ann; Chase, Stephanie; Gabree, Scott (2013). Defining Characteristics of Intentional Fatalities on Railway Rights-of-Way in the United States, 2007–2010 (PDF) (Report). U.S. Federal Railroad Administration. DOT/FRA/ORD-13/25.
- Botha, Jan L.; Elmasu, Kristina A.; Leitzell, Philip J. (2010). Suicides on Commuter Rail in California: Possible Patterns—A Case Study (PDF) (Report). Mineta Transportation Institute. CA-MTI-10-2926.
- Gabree, Scott; Hiltunen, Danielle; Ranalli, Emma (2019). Railroad Implemented Countermeasures to Prevent Suicide: Review of Public Information (PDF) (Report). U.S. Federal Railroad Administration. DOT/FRA/ORD-19/04.
- Sherry, Patrick (2016). Remedial Actions to Prevent Suicides on Commuter and Metro Rail Systems (PDF) (Report). Mineta Transportation Institute. CA-MTI-14-1129.
- Too, Lay San; Bugeja, Lyndal; Millner, Allison; McClure, Roderick; Spittal, Matthew (2017). "Predictors of using trains as a suicide method: Findings from Victoria, Australia". Psychiatry Res. 253: 233–239. doi:10.1016/j.psychres.2017.03.057. hdl:11343/129526. PMID 28395228. Archived from the original on 1 April 2024.
- Topel, Kurt (January 2019). "A Literature Review of Rail Trespassing and Suicide Prevention Research" (PDF). Transportation Research Board. ISSN 0097-8515.
