= Nobu Jo =

Japanese philanthropist (1872–1959)

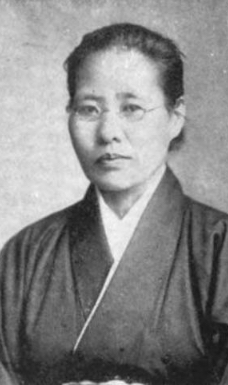
- Nobu Jo, from a 1923 publication.
- Born: October 18, 1872
- Died: December 20, 1959 (aged 87)
- Occupation: philanthropist

Nobu Jo (城ノブ, October 18, 1872 – December 20, 1959) was a Japanese Christian philanthropist, based in Kobe. She was head of the Kobe Woman's Welfare Association, and gained international attention in the 1920s for her suicide prevention campaign of signage and personal intervention.

== Early life ==
Nobu Jo was born in Ehime prefecture on October 18, 1872. She was the daughter of a doctor. She was educated at a Christian mission school in Matsuyama.

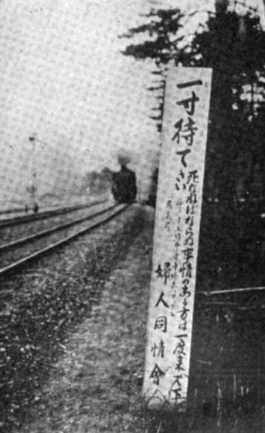
One of Nobu Jo's rail suicide prevention signboards, placed alongside railroad tracks near Kobe; from a 1921 publication.

== Career ==
Jo was founder and head of the Kobe Woman's Welfare Association (Kobe Fujin Dojokai). She was known for her suicide prevention campaign. Beginning in 1916 near Suma, she placed large, well-lit signs in high-risk places, including train stations and bridges. The signs advised suicidal visitors to stop, to wait, and to visit Jo's home or office, if they were experiencing despair. Jo believed that many suicidal people in the city experienced stress, poor health, poverty, and social isolation, and that these underlying issues might be resolved or relieved without loss of life. She received letters thanking her for the signage, and was credited with saving thousands of lives.

Jo and her organization also started a kindergarten, and assisted domestic violence survivors. She sheltered hundreds of women from abuse in a Kobe residence she established for the purpose, and once telling an angry man with a knife, "You may have your wife back just as soon as you become a decent man and deserve her." She helped women arrange education, employment, housing, travel, and childcare, but also offered spiritual guidance and counseling. "Her efforts are untiring, her sympathies wide, her methods effectual, as she carries on her work of saving women from suicide", declared an Australian newspaper in 1936. Her work continued through World War II and into the postwar era, even adding a retirement home for older women. Jo grew deaf with age, was injured in a fire during the war, and was described as "frail" and "lame" by visitors in her later years.

== Personal life ==
Nobu Jo was married in 1903. She died in 1959, aged 87 years.
