= Suma-ku =

Suma-ku 須磨区
- Ward of Kobe
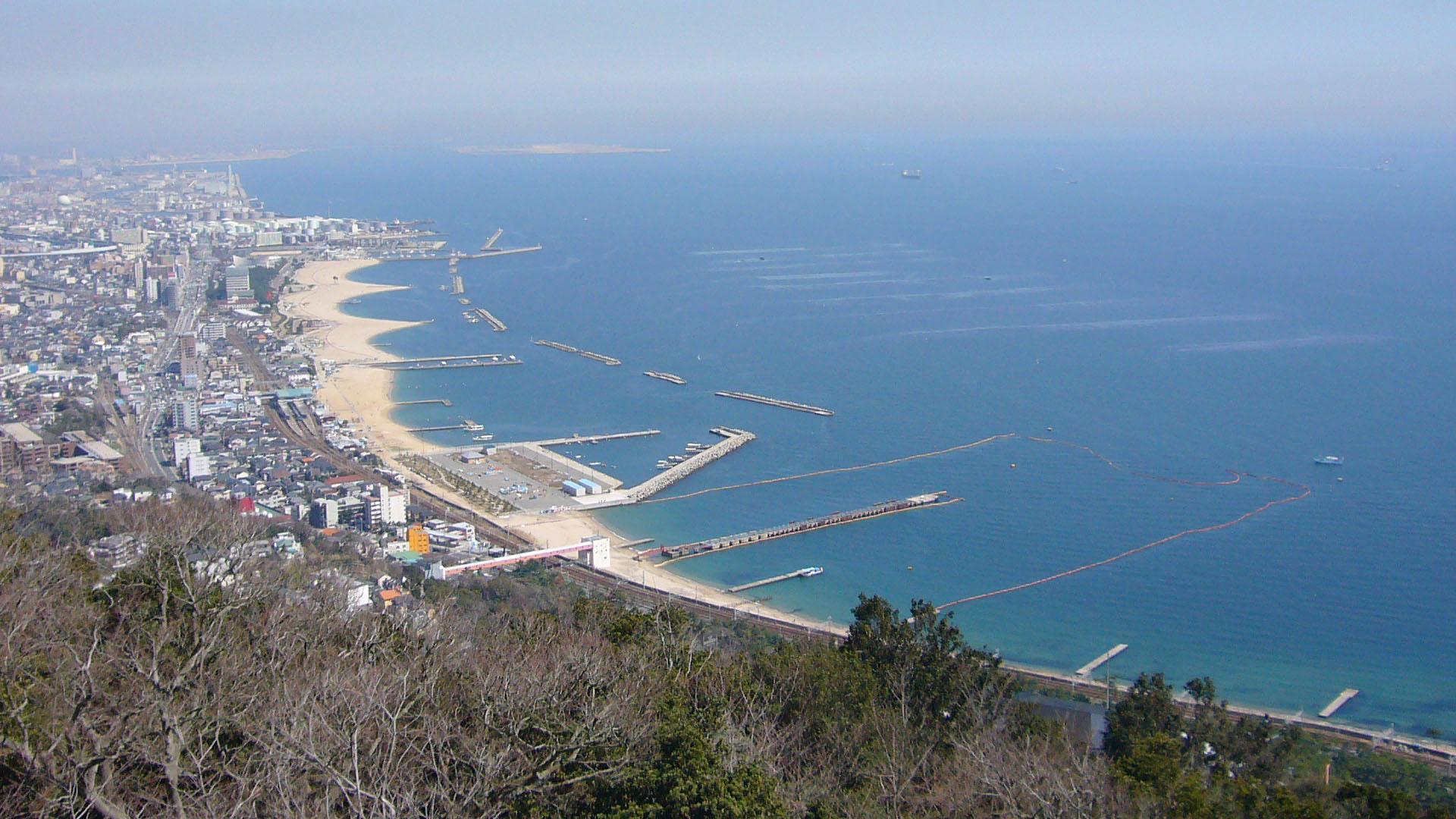
- View of Suma Beach from Mount Sumaura Amusement Park

- Location of Suma-ku in Kobe

- Coordinates: 34°39′01″N 135°07′50″E
- Country: Japan
- Region: Kinki (Kansai)
- Prefecture: Hyōgo
- City: Kobe

Area
  - Total: 30.00 km^{2} (11.58 sq mi)

Population (February 1, 2012)
  - Total: 166,324
  - Density: 5,544.13/km^{2} (14,359.2/sq mi)
- Time zone: UTC+9 (Japan Standard Time)
- Phone number: 078-731-4341
- Address: 1-1-1Nakashima-cho, Suma-ku, Kobe-shi, Hyogo-ken, 654-8570
- Website: www.city.kobe.lg.jp/ward/kuyakusho/suma

Suma (須磨区, Suma-ku) is one of 9 wards of Kobe, Japan.

== Population ==
As of February 1, 2012, it had an area of 30.0 km^{2} and a population of 166,324, with 71,745 households.

== Attractions ==
There is a white sandy beach in this ward, which attracts tourists to the Kansai region for sunbathing and popular events during the summer. The beach is also a location in the Japanese literary classics Ise Monogatari, Genji Monogatari, and Heike Monogatari. Suma is often referred to as an utamakura or meisho, and is mentioned frequently in waka, and in Noh, Kabuki and Bunraku dramas.

== Transport ==
Nowadays, people mainly live in Myodani, Myohoji and other northern parts of the ward.

Myōdani Station is a major station in western Kobe.

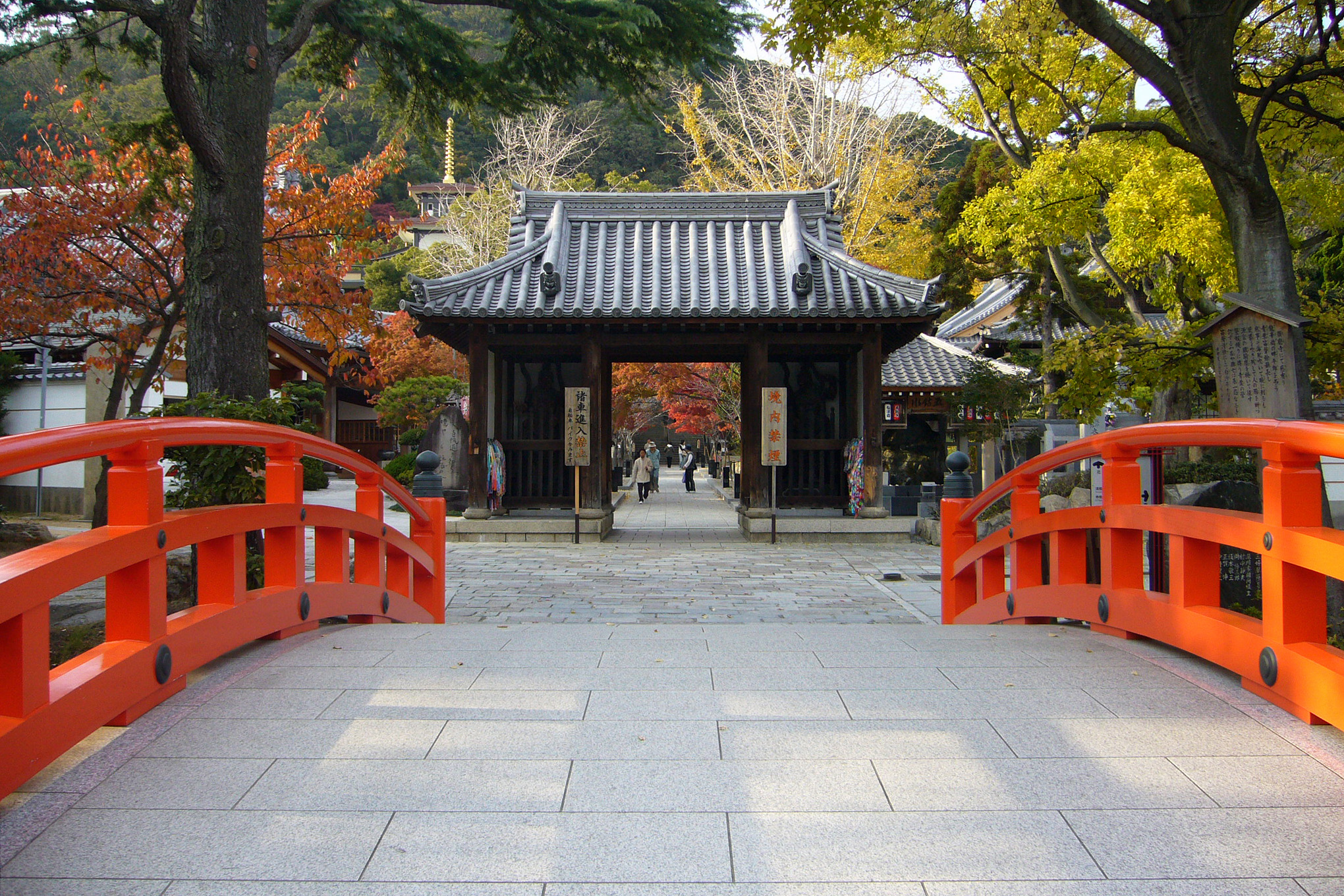
Suma Temple

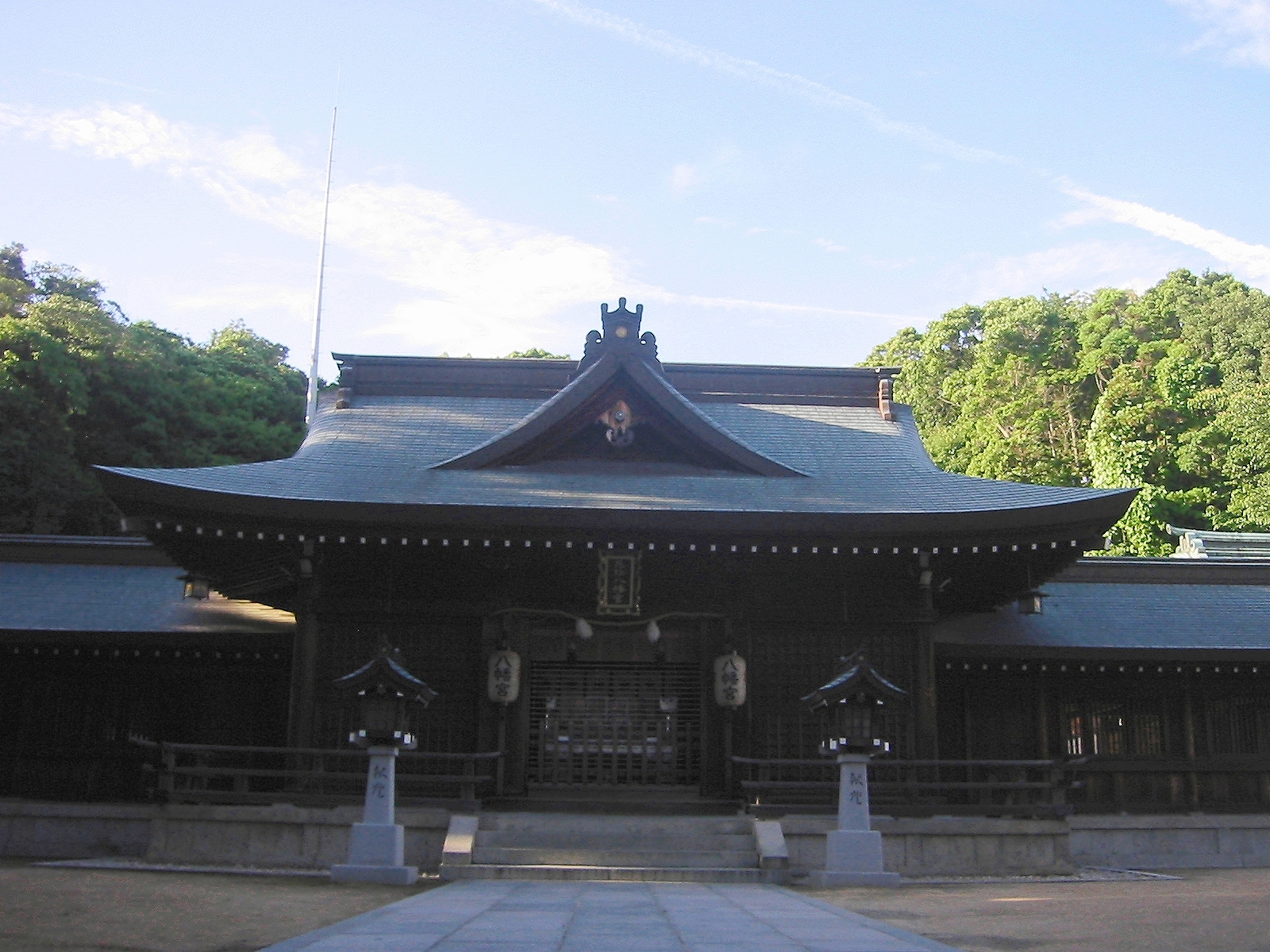
Tainohata Yakuyoke Hachimangu

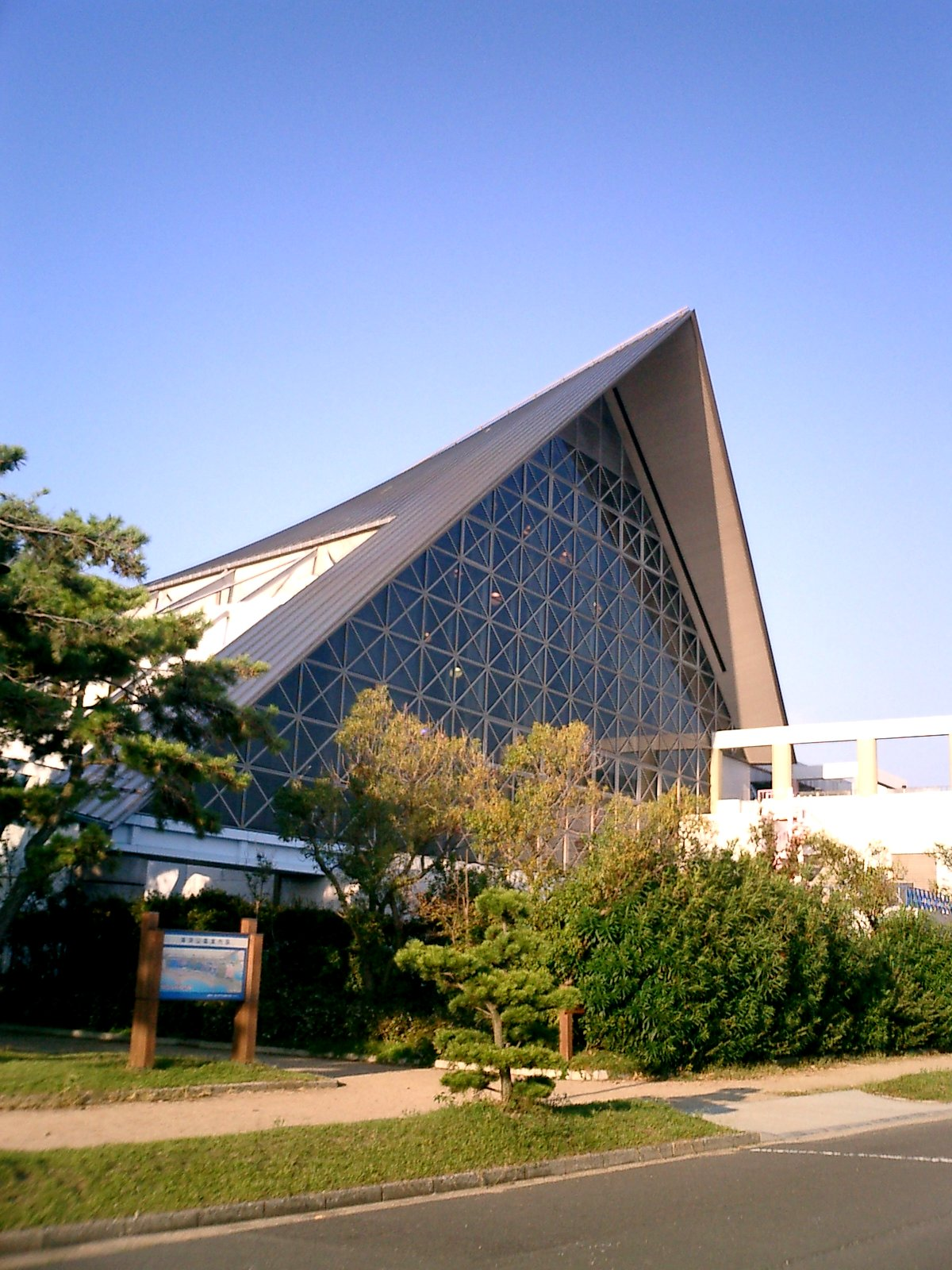
Suma Aquarium at Suma beach

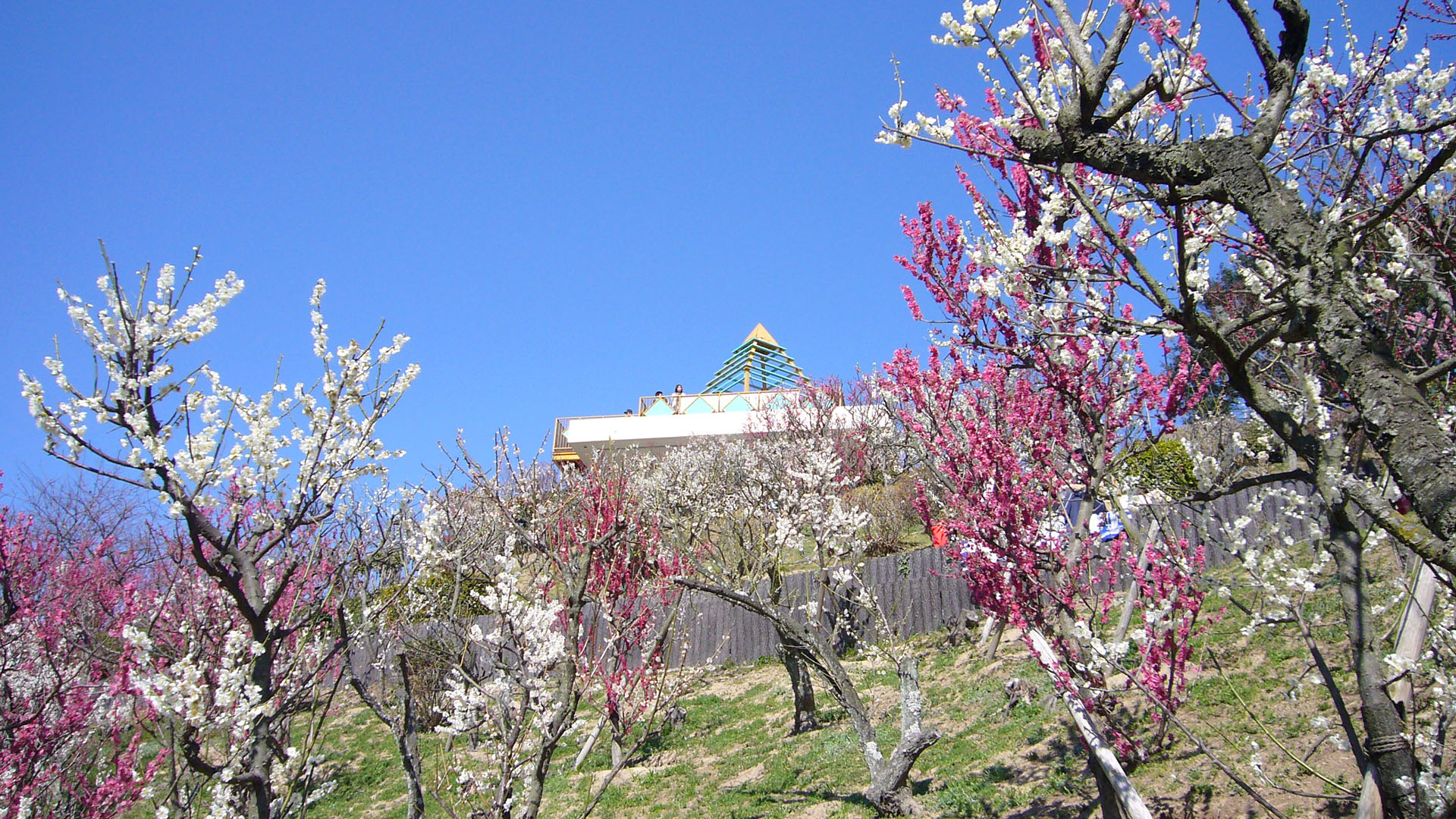
Mount Sumaura Park

== Places of interest ==
- Suma Rikyu Park
- Suma Aqualife Park

== Notable people ==
- Shintaro Ishihara - Governor of Tokyo
- Nobu Jo - social worker, founder of a suicide prevention campaign in Suma
- Takazumi Katayama - professional motorcycle racer. First Japanese competitor to win an FIM road racing World Championship.
- Yone Suzuki - businesswoman, lived in Suma-ku before 1927

== See also ==
- Japanese cruiser Suma
- Japanese gunboat Suma
- Kobe child murders
- Myōdani Station
