= Suma Rikyu Park =

Park with botanical garden in Hyōgo, Japan

Coordinates: 34°39′14″N 135°07′03″E

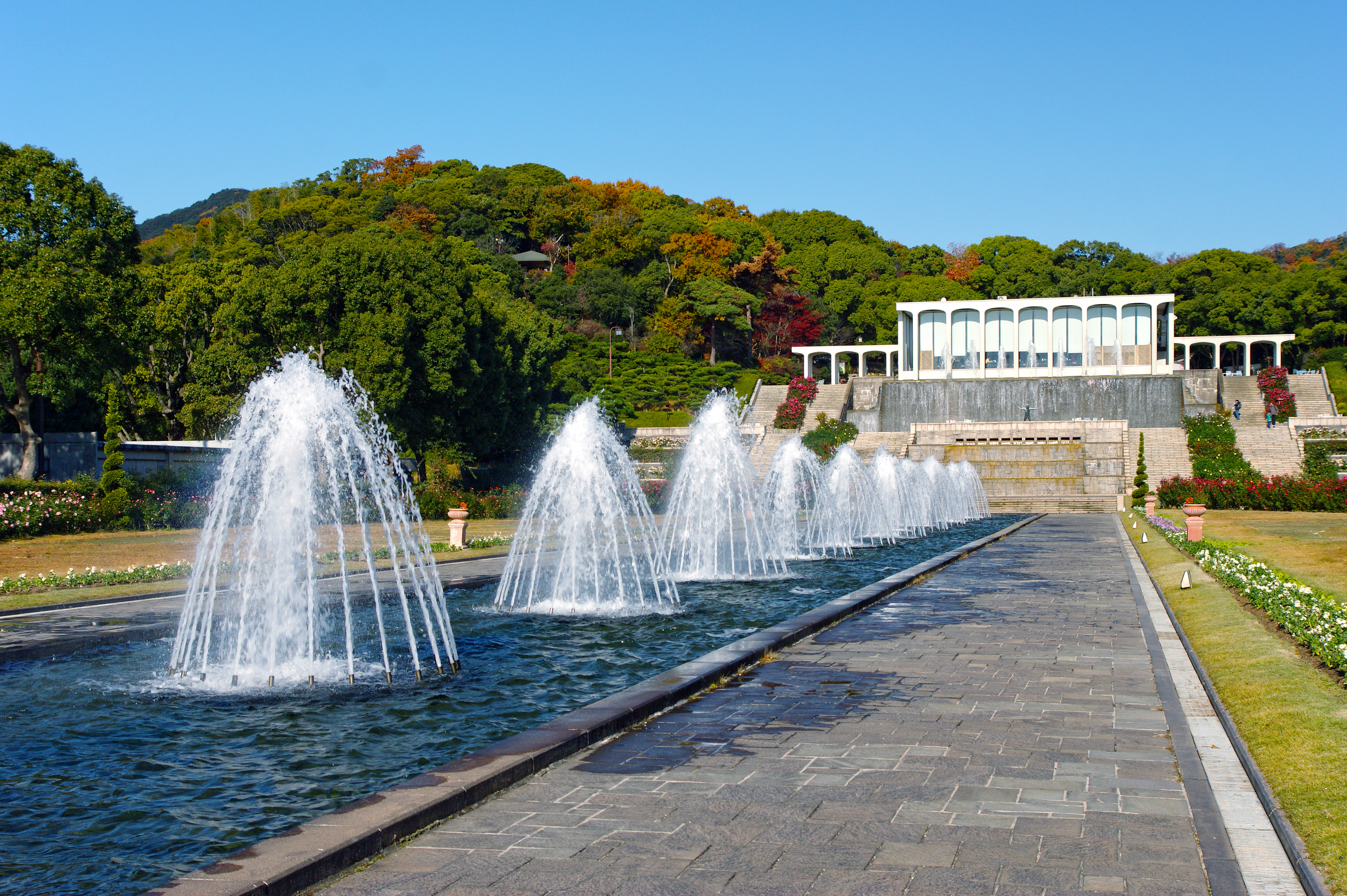
Suma Rikyu Park

The Suma Rikyu Park (須磨離宮公園, Suma Rikyū Kōen; 82.6 hectares) is a park with botanical garden located at Higashi Suma 1-1, Suma-ku, Kobe, Hyōgo, Japan. It is open daily except Thursdays; an admission fee is charged.

== Layout ==
The park was created in 1967 on the general model of the Palace of Versailles park. It includes about 230 types of trees, substantial gardens of iris (40 varieties), rose (160 varieties), and camellia, as well as a botanical garden with greenhouse, collections of hydrangea, peony, and cherry trees (20 varieties), a Japanese garden, tea ceremony rooms, a drive lined with maple trees, etc. The park also includes fountains, a picnic area and restaurant, playground, and an athletic pathway with 28 stations.

== See also ==
- List of botanical gardens in Japan
