= Ashfield House =

Mock-up London Underground tube station

Coordinates: 51°29′28″N 0°12′14″W

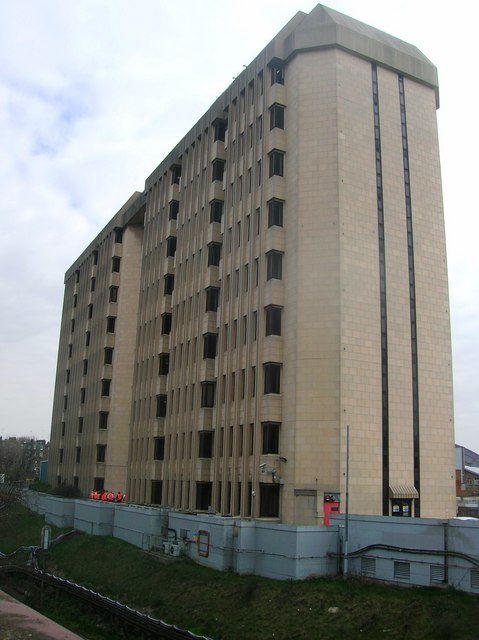
Exterior view of Ashfield House from Cromwell Road

Ashfield House is a Transport for London building in West Kensington in the London Borough of Hammersmith and Fulham. It contains West Ashfield, a staff training facility for the London Underground. It was opened in 2010 at a cost of £800,000.

The facility replaced one at White City opened in 1963 which in turn replaced the first Underground training centre at Lambeth North.

== Facilities ==
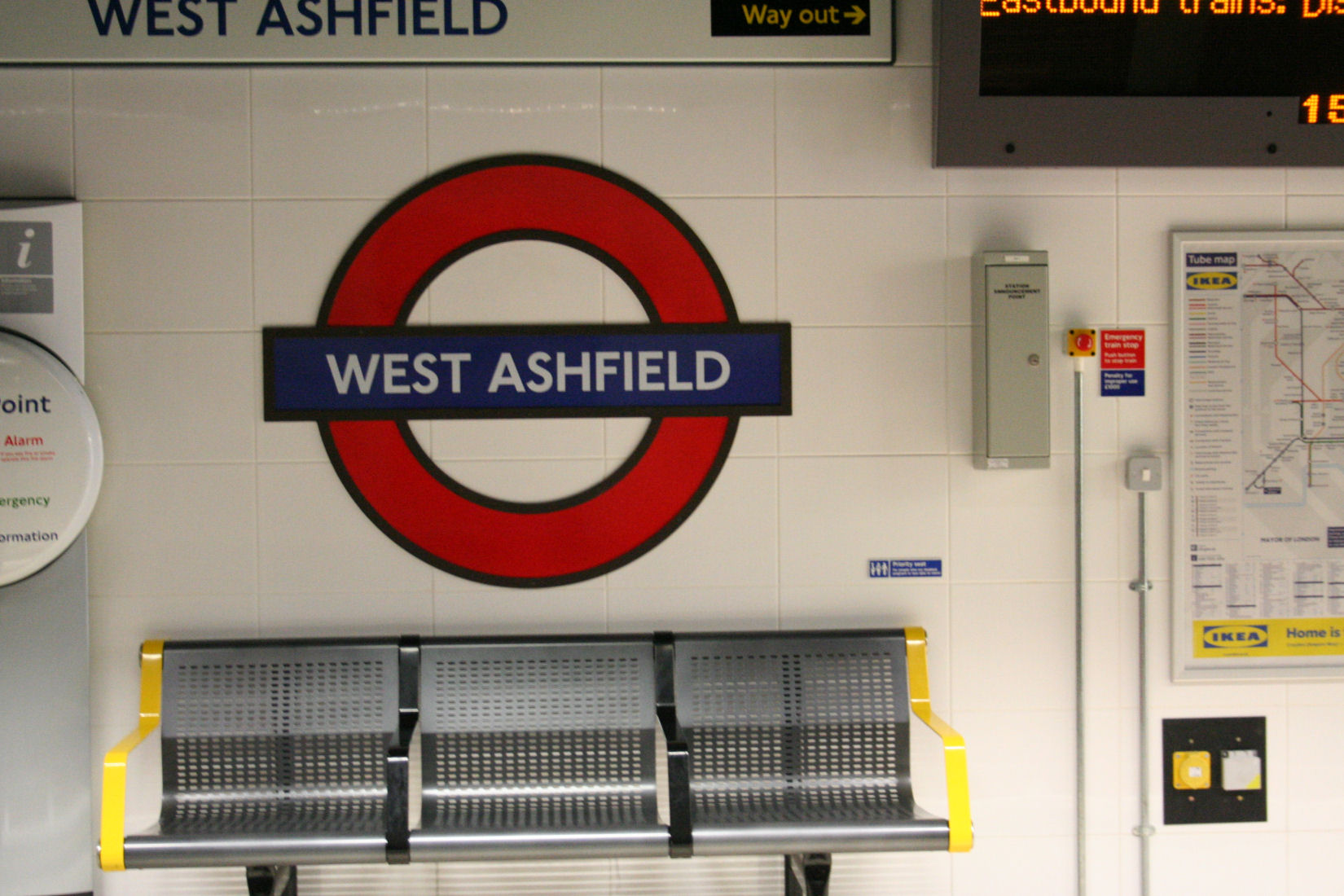
Signage, seating and station roundel at Ashfield House's West Ashfield training facility

Designed by Reyneke Designs and completed in 2009, the facility is used by TfL for training staff and is laid out exactly as a real station would be, except it is significantly shorter, the suicide pit is a painted effect and the train façade in the tunnel won't move into the station.

The single platform is nominally a westbound platform on the District line situated between West Kensington and Earl's Court station. Staff are able to run training sessions which simulate signal points, tannoy announcements and electricity power controls. A fan in an upper corner of the room simulates the familiar blast of air when a train arrives and the platform can vibrate to simulate the rumbling of an approaching train.

There is a model railway at the West Ashfield training facility, also designed by Reyneke Designs, which is used to simulate various faults so that staff can learn how to deal with them. The five stations on the model railway are Hobbs End, Kensington Palace, West Ashfield, Strand-on-the-Green and Hammersmith Bridge.

== Decommissioning ==
As part of the joint venture between Transport for London and the developers of the Earls Court Exhibition Centre site, the plan is to regenerate the area. This will involve shutting down the historic Lillie Bridge Depot along with Ashfield House by 2024.
