= Safety on the London Underground =

This article is primarily concerned with accidents on the London Underground network, which carries around a billion passengers a year. Statistically, there is just one fatal accident for every 300 million journeys. There are several safety warnings given to passengers, such as the traditional 'mind the gap' announcement and the regular announcements for passengers to keep behind the yellow line. Relatively few accidents are caused by overcrowding on the platforms, and staff monitor platforms and passageways at busy times preventing people entering the system if they become overcrowded.

== Suicide ==
Most fatalities on the network are suicides. Most platforms at deep tube stations have pits beneath the track, originally constructed to aid drainage of water from the platforms, but they also help prevent death or serious injury when a passenger falls or jumps in front of a train and aid access to the casualty. These pits are officially called "anti-suicide pits", colloquially "suicide pits" or "dead man's trenches". A person jumping or falling in front of a train is sometimes referred to by staff as a "one under". London Underground has a specialist therapy unit to deal with drivers' post-traumatic stress resulting from someone jumping under their train.

== Terrorism ==
Terrorism in the London Underground has been a major concern because the Underground's importance makes it a prime target for attacks. Many warnings and several attacks, some successful, have been made on the Underground. The earliest attack on the network was in 1885, when a bomb exploded on a Metropolitan line train at Euston Square station. The Provisional IRA and its predecessors carried out over ten separate attacks between 1939 and 1993.

By far the deadliest terrorist attack was the 7 July 2005 London bombings, in which 52 people were killed in four coordinated suicide bombings by Islamic militants. The most recent attack causing damage was the Parsons Green bombing on 15 September 2017, when a man detonated a homemade bomb on a District line train at Parsons Green station.

== Tobacco and alcohol ==
Various regulations aim to improve safety on the Tube. Smoking was allowed in certain carriages in trains until 9 July 1984. In the middle of 1987 smoking was banned for a six-month trial period in all parts of the Underground, and the ban was made permanent after the major King's Cross fire in November 1987.

From 1 June 2008 an alcohol ban was introduced on all TfL services. This change in policy was made by Boris Johnson soon after he was elected Mayor of London in May 2008. He claimed that a public transport drinking ban would reduce crime.

== Fire risk ==
Following the 1987 King's Cross fire as well as the permanent smoking ban on all London Underground premises, the programme of wooden escalator replacement was sped up, and stricter controls on the storage of materials were introduced.

== Photography ==
Photography for private use is permitted in public areas of the Underground at the discretion of the station, but the use of tripods and other supports is forbidden as it poses a danger in the often cramped spaces and crowds found underground. Flash photography is also forbidden as it may distract drivers and disrupt fire-detection equipment. For the same reason bright auto-focus assist lights should be switched off or covered when photographing in the Underground.

== Criticism ==
The Underground's staff safety regimen has drawn criticism. In January 2002 it was fined £225,000 for breaching safety standards for workers. In court, the judge reprimanded the company for "sacrificing safety" to keep trains running "at all costs." Workers had been instructed to work in the dark with the power rails live, even during rainstorms. Several workers had received electric shocks as a result.

== Staff safety training facility ==
A special staff training facility was opened at West Ashfield tube station in TFL's Ashfield House, West Kensington in 2010 at a cost of £800,000. Meanwhile, London Mayor, Boris Johnson, decided it should be demolished along with the Earls Court Exhibition Centre as part of Europe's biggest regeneration scheme.

== See also ==
- British Transport Police § Jurisdiction
- British Transport Police § Emergency Response Unit
- British Transport Police § Medic Response Unit
- London Underground emergency response unit
