= Misakikōen Station =

Misakikōen Station is the name of two train stations in Japan:

- Misakikōen Station (Hyōgo) (御崎公園駅)
- Misakikōen Station (Osaka) (みさき公園駅)
