= Noevir Stadium Kobe =

Football and rugby union stadium in Kobe, Japan

NOEVIR Stadium Kobe
- ノエビアスタジアム神戸
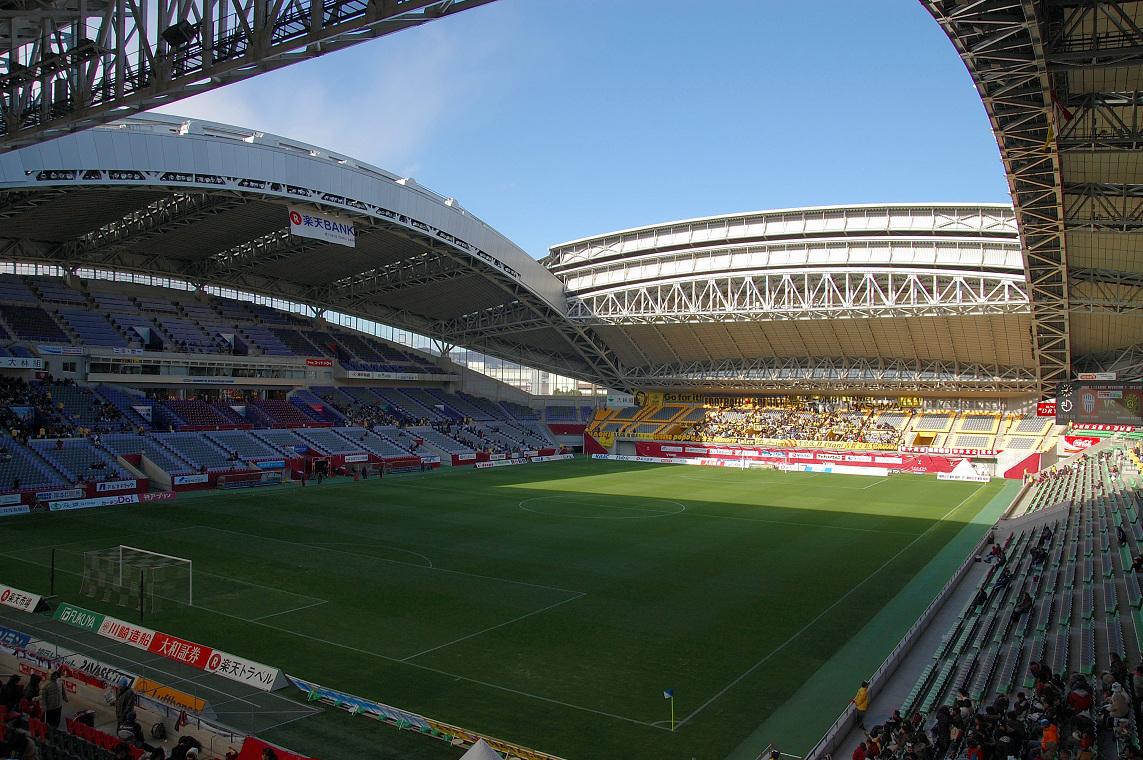
- Interactive map of NOEVIR Stadium Kobe
- Full name: NOEVIR Stadium Kobe
- Former names: Kobe Wing Stadium (2001–2007); Home's Stadium Kobe (2007–2013)
- Address: 1–2–2 Misaki-Cho, Hyōgo-ku, Kobe, Japan
- Coordinates: 34°39′24″N 135°10′08″E
- Owner: Kobe City
- Operator: Kobe Wing Stadium Co., Ltd.
- Capacity: 30,132
- Type: Stadium
- Surface: Grass
- Field size: 105 x 68 m
- Field shape: Square
- Public transit: Kobe Municipal Subway: Kaigan Line at Misaki-Kōen; JR West: Wadamisaki Line at Wadamisaki (limited service)

Construction
- Opened: 2001

Tenants
- Vissel Kobe; INAC Kobe Leonessa; Kobelco Kobe Steelers; Japan National Football Team

The Kobe City Misaki Park Stadium (神戸市御崎公園球技場), a.k.a. Noevir Stadium Kobe (ノエビアスタジアム神戸), is a football stadium in Misaki Park, Hyogo-ku, Kobe, Japan. The stadium has a capacity of 30,132. This stadium, which features a retractable roof, is the home ground of J1 League club Vissel Kobe and the rugby union Japan Rugby League One team Kobelco Kobe Steelers.

In 1970, Kobe Central Football Stadium (神戸市立中央競技場) was opened at the site of the Kobe Keirin Track. It was the first football stadium in Japan to be able to host games at night following the installation of floodlights.

== 2002 FIFA World Cup ==
In order to host the 2002 FIFA World Cup, the stadium was renovated to install a removable roof and increase spectator capacity. It was opened under the name Kobe Wing Stadium in November 2001 with a capacity of 42,000.

Date	Team 1	Result	Team 2	Round	Attendance
5 June 2002	Russia	2–0	Tunisia	Group H	30,957
7 June 2002	Sweden	2–1	Nigeria	Group F	36,194
17 June 2002	Brazil	2–0	Belgium	Round of 16	40,440

Reopened in 2003 with a reduced capacity of 32,000 Kobe Wing Stadium became the home of the Vissel Kobe football club.

== 2019 Rugby World Cup ==
The stadium was announced as one of the venues for 2019 Rugby World Cup which will be the first Rugby World Cup to be held in Asia. Four group games were played in the stadium between the end of September and early October 2019.

== Naming rights ==
In February 2007, Next Co., Ltd. (the owner of the real estate website "Home's") purchased the naming rights to the stadium from the city of Kobe for three years at a sum of 70 million yen per year. The stadium was renamed "Home's Stadium Kobe" on March 1, 2007, and the contract was renewed for a further three years in January 2010.

In 2012, the city of Kobe sought tenders for a new naming sponsor. Kobe-based cosmetics company Noevir was the only bidder, and in February 2013, the city announced the conclusion of a three-year contract for the sum of 65 million yen per year. The stadium became known as Noevir Stadium Kobe on 1 March 2013.

== See also ==
- Lists of stadiums
- List of football stadiums in Japan
