= Ōkurayama Station =

Ōkurayama Station may refer to:

- Ōkurayama Station (Kanagawa) - (大倉山駅) A station in Kanagawa Prefecture, Japan, served by Tokyu Toyoko Line
- Ōkurayama Station (Hyōgo) - (大倉山駅) A station in Hyogo Prefecture, Japan, served by Kobe Municipal Subway Seishin-Yamate Line
