= Komagabayashi Station =

Metro station in Kobe, Japan

Coordinates: 34.6522°N 135.1495°E

Komagabayashi Station 駒ヶ林駅
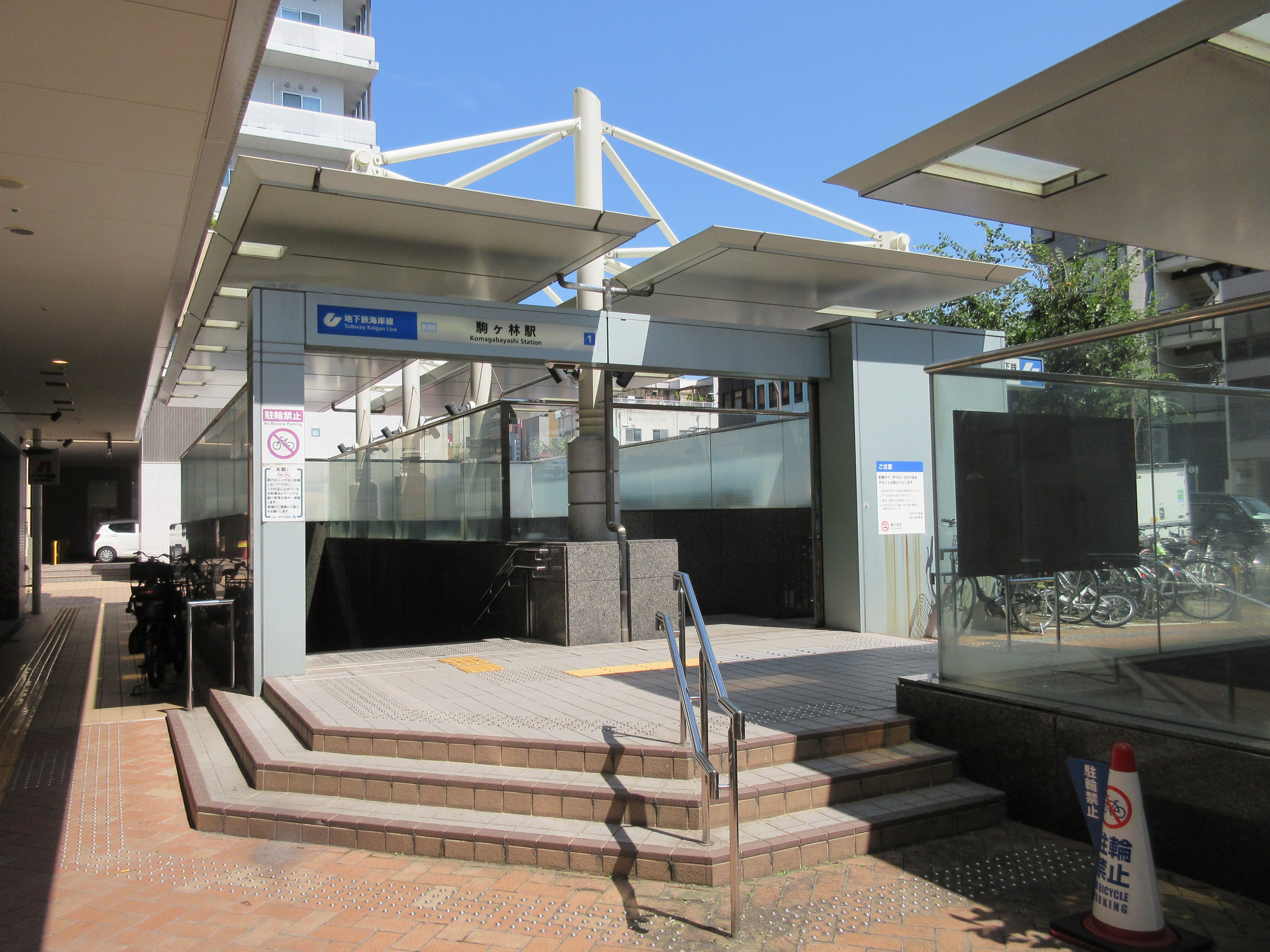
- Station

General information
- Location: Nagata Ward, Kobe, Hyōgo Prefecture; Japan
- System: Kobe Municipal Subway station
- Operator: Kobe Municipal Transportation Bureau
- Line: Kaigan Line
- Platforms: 1 island platform
- Tracks: 2

Other information
- Station code: K09

History
- Opened: 7 July 2001; 25 years ago

Services
Preceding station	Kobe Municipal Subway	Following station
Shin-Nagata Terminus	Kaigan Line	Karumo towards Sannomiya-Hanadokeimae
Location
- Location within Kobe Location within Hyōgo Prefecture Location within Kansai region Location within Japan

Komagabayashi Station (駒ヶ林駅, Komagabayashi-eki) is a train station in Nagata-ku, Kobe, Hyōgo Prefecture, Japan.

== Lines ==
- Kobe Municipal Subway

- Kaigan Line Station K09

== Gallery ==
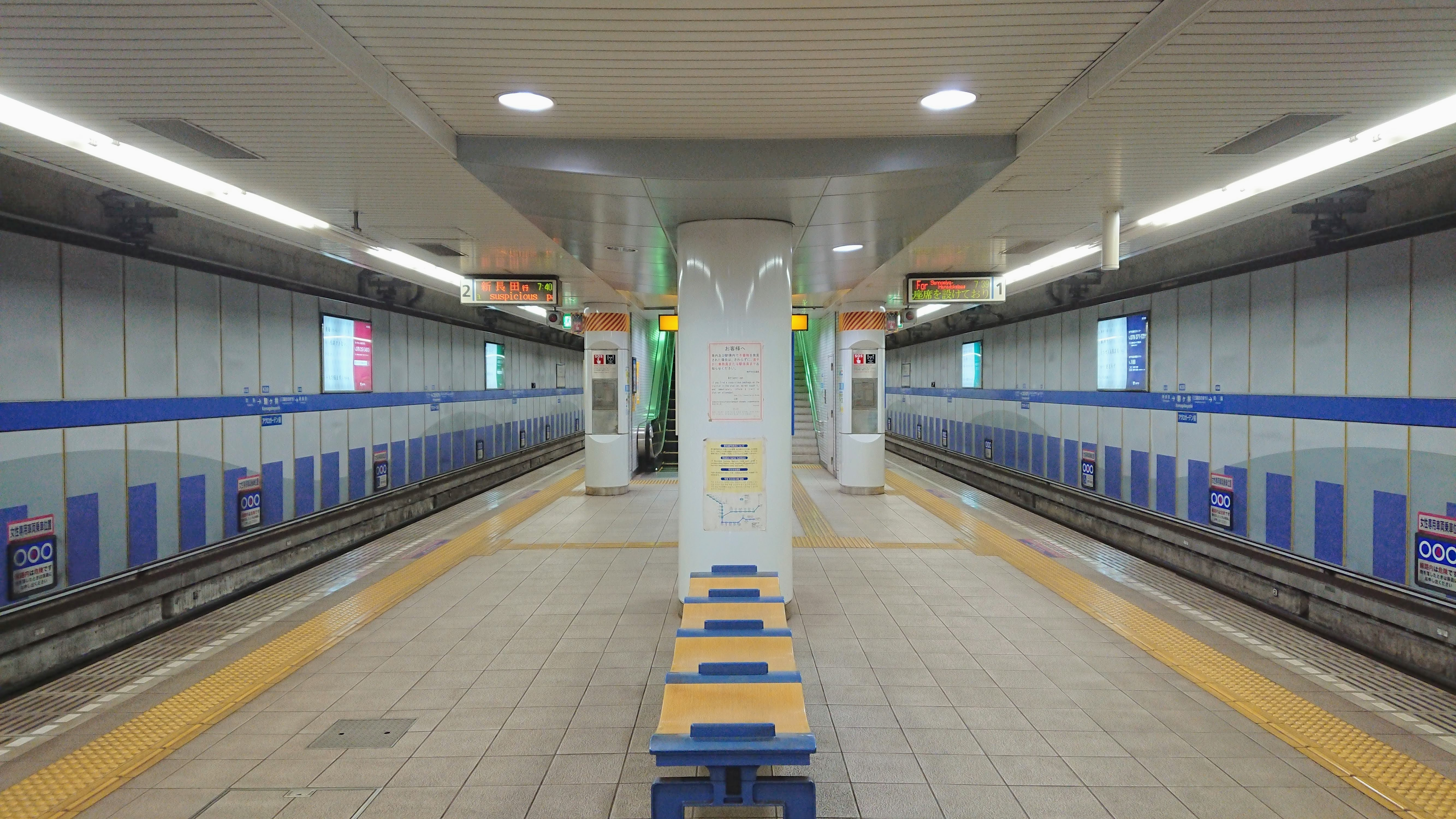
Platforms

== History ==
The station was opened on 7 July 2001.
