= Misaki-Kōen Station =

Misaki-Kōen Station could refer to:

- Misaki-Kōen Station (Hyōgo) - a station on the Kobe Municipal Subway Kaigan Line
- Misaki-kōen Station (Osaka) - a station on the Nankai Main Line and Nankai Tanagawa Line
