= Karumo Station =

Metro station in Kobe, Japan

Coordinates: 34.6534°N 135.1565°E

Karumo Station 苅藻駅
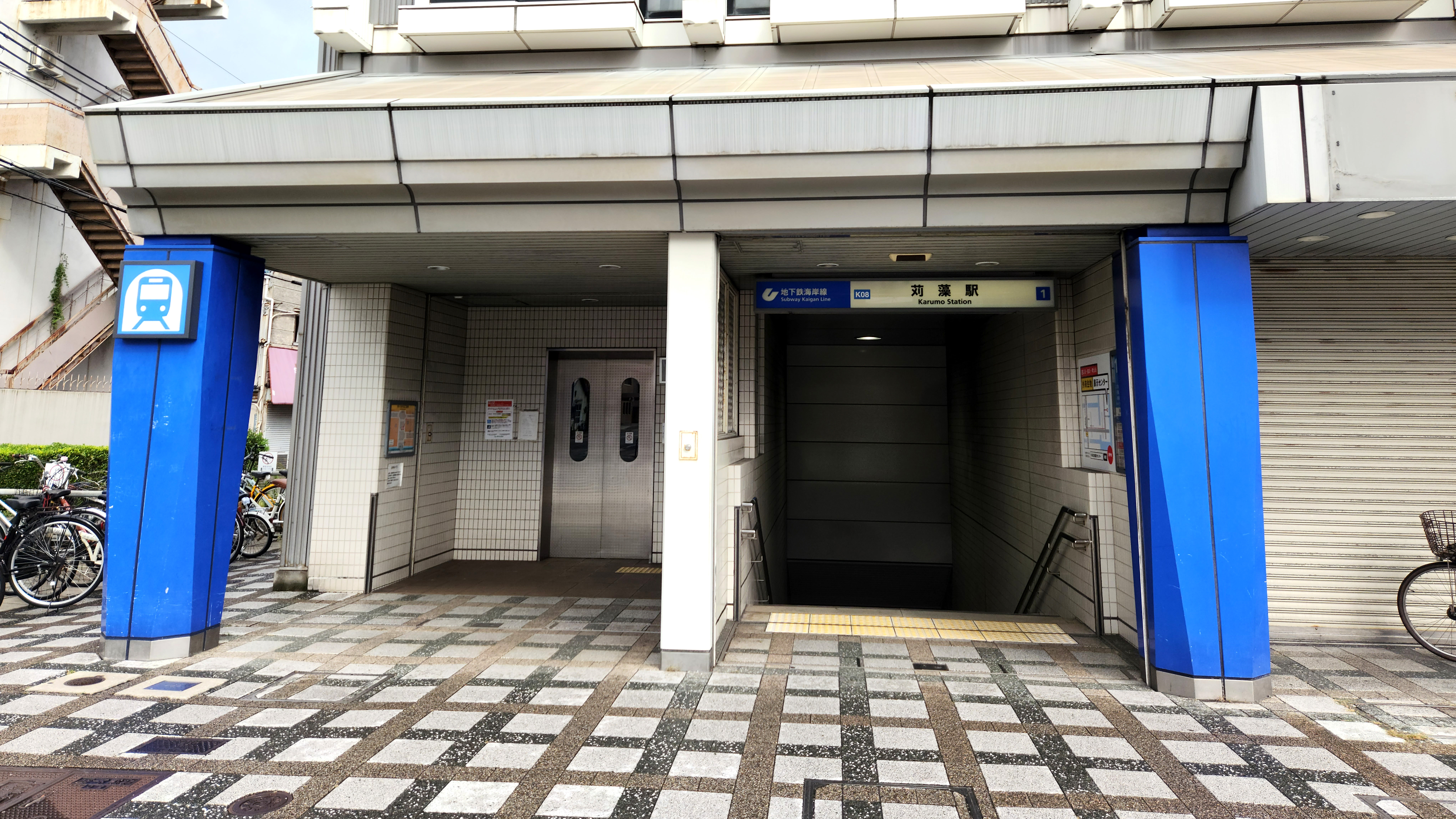
- The no.1 entrance in October 2023

General information
- Location: Nagata Ward, Kobe, Hyōgo Prefecture; Japan
- System: Kobe Municipal Subway station
- Operator: Kobe Municipal Transportation Bureau
- Line: Kaigan Line
- Platforms: 1 island platform
- Tracks: 2

Other information
- Station code: K08

History
- Opened: 7 July 2001; 25 years ago

Services
Preceding station	Kobe Municipal Subway	Following station
Komagabayashi towards Shin-Nagata	Kaigan Line	Misaki-Kōen towards Sannomiya-Hanadokeimae
Location
- Location within Kobe Location within Hyōgo Prefecture Location within Japan

Karumo Station (苅藻駅, Karumo-eki) is a train station in Hyōgo-ku, Kobe, Hyōgo Prefecture, Japan.

== Lines ==
- Kobe Municipal Subway

- Kaigan Line Station K08

== History ==
The station was opened on 7 July 2001.
