= Itayado Station =

Metro station in Kobe, Japan

Coordinates: 34.6600576°N 135.1334238°E

Itayado Station 板宿駅
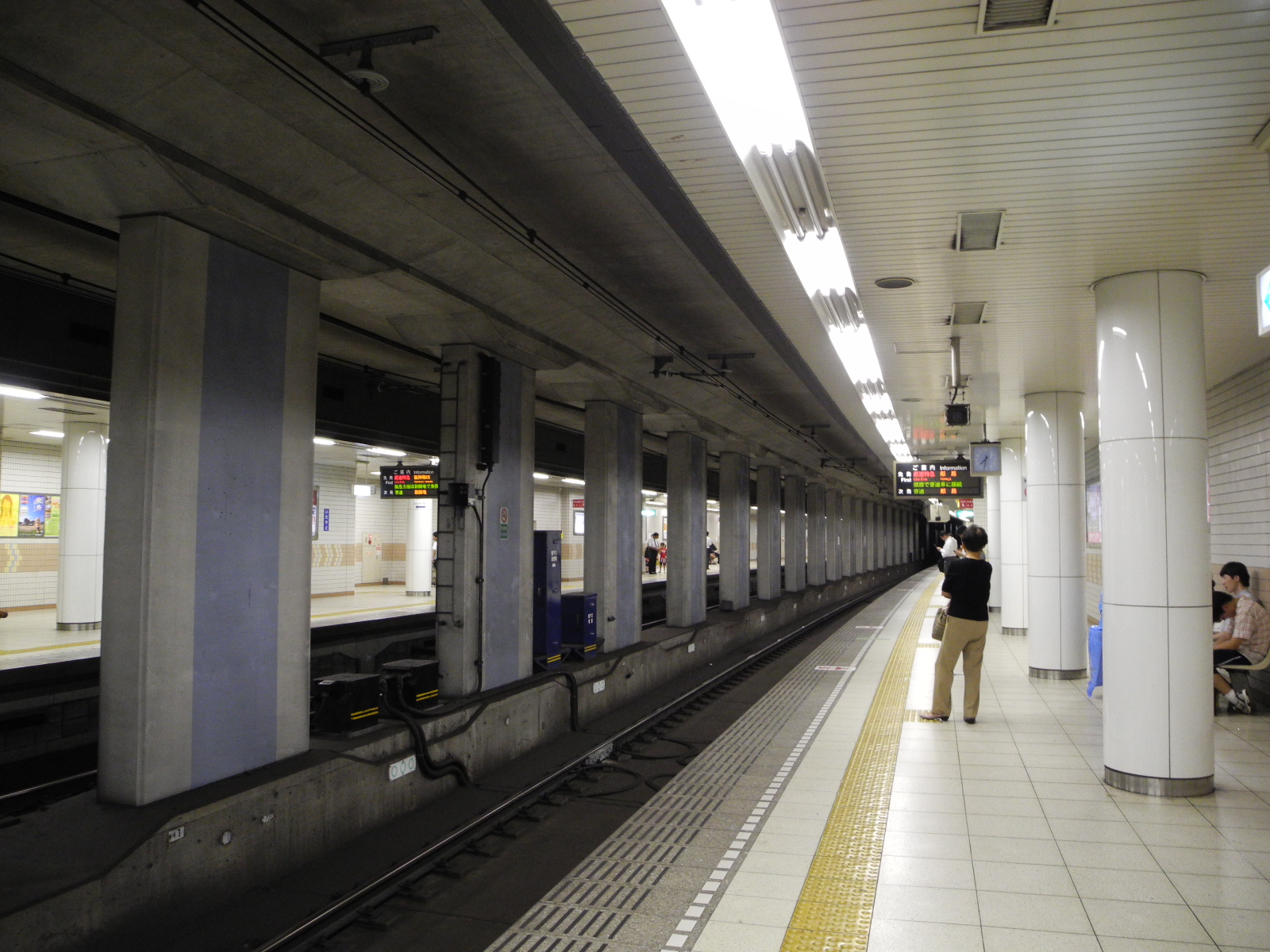
- Sanyo Electric Railway platforms

General information
- System: Kobe Municipal Subway station
- Operator: Sanyo Electric Railway; Kobe Municipal Transportation Bureau
- Lines: Main Line; Seishin-Yamate Line
- Platforms: 2 side platforms (Sanyo Electric Railway); 1 island platform (Kobe Municipal Subway)
- Tracks: 4

Other information
- Station code: SY02 (Sanyo Electric Railway); S10 (Kobe Municipal Subway)

History
- Opened: 1910 (Sanyo Electric Railway); 1977 (Kobe Municipal Subway)
- Rebuilt: 1995 (Sanyo Electric Railway)

Services
Preceding station	Kobe Municipal Subway	Following station
Myōhōji towards Seishin-Chuo	Seishin-Yamate Line	Shin-Nagata towards Shin-Kobe
Location
- Location within Kobe Location within Hyōgo Prefecture Location within Japan

Itayado Station (板宿駅, Itayado-eki) is a railway station in Suma-ku, Kobe, Hyōgo Prefecture, Japan.

== Lines ==
- Kobe Municipal Subway

- Seishin-Yamate Line - Station S10

- Sanyo Electric Railway

- Main Line - Station SY 02

== Layout ==
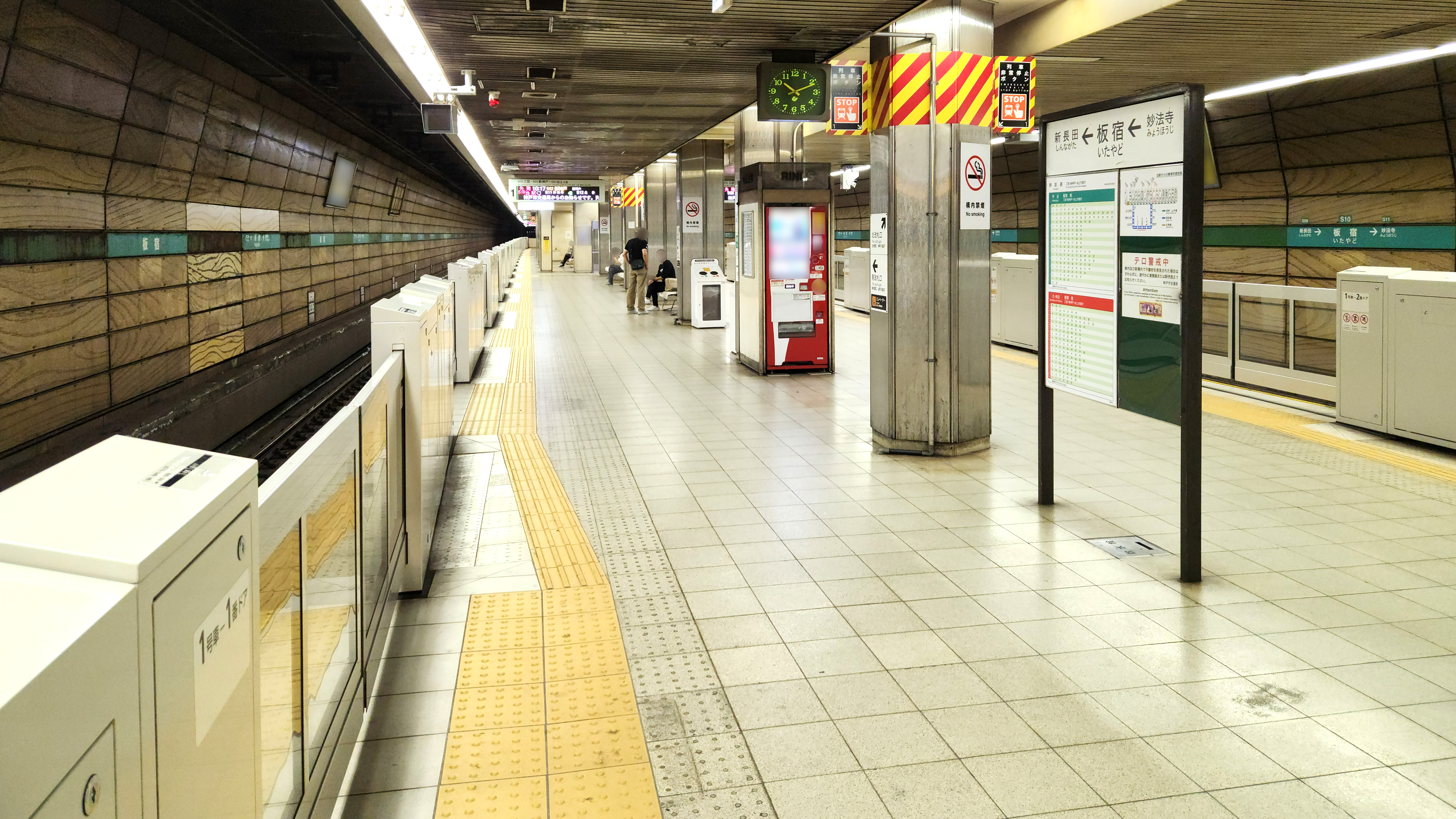
Seishin-Yamate Line platform

Sanyo Railway Main Line

- two side platforms serving a track each

1	■ Main Line	for Akashi, Himeji and Aboshi
2	■ Main Line	for Sannomiya, Osaka and Kyoto

Seishin-Yamate Line

- an island platform serving two tracks

1	■ Seishin-Yamate Line	for Sannomiya, Shin-Kobe and Tanigami
2	■ Seishin-Yamate Line	for Myōdani and Seishin-chūō

== History ==
The first station known as Itayado opened in 1910 as a surface station on the Sanyo Electric Railway. In 1977, the first stretch of the Seishin-Yamate Line opened.

The station was affected by the 1995 Kobe earthquake on January 17, 1995. While the Seishin-Yamate Line resumed limited service the following day, the Sanyo Electric Railway station was heavily damaged in the earthquake and consequently had to be relocated underground. Service was suspended on the railway until the new underground station opened in March of that year.

== Adjacent stations ==
«	Service	»
Sanyo Electric Railway (SY 02)
Main Line
Nishidai (SY 01, HS 39)	Sanyo Local	Higashi-Suma (SY 03)
Nishidai (SY 01, HS 39)	Hanshin Local	Higashi-Suma (SY 03)
Nishidai (SY 01, HS 39)	Hanshin Limited Express	Higashi-Suma (SY 03)
Nishidai (SY 01, HS 39)	Sanyo S Limited Express	Tsukimiyama (SY 04)
Nishidai (SY 01, HS 39)	Through Limited Express (yellow marking)	Tsukimiyama (SY 04)
Kosoku Nagata (Hanshin Railway Kōbe Kosoku Line, HS 38)	Through Limited Express (red marking)	Tsukimiyama (SY 04)
