= Higashi-Suma Station =

Railway station in Kobe, Japan

Coordinates: 34°39′19″N 135°07′39″E

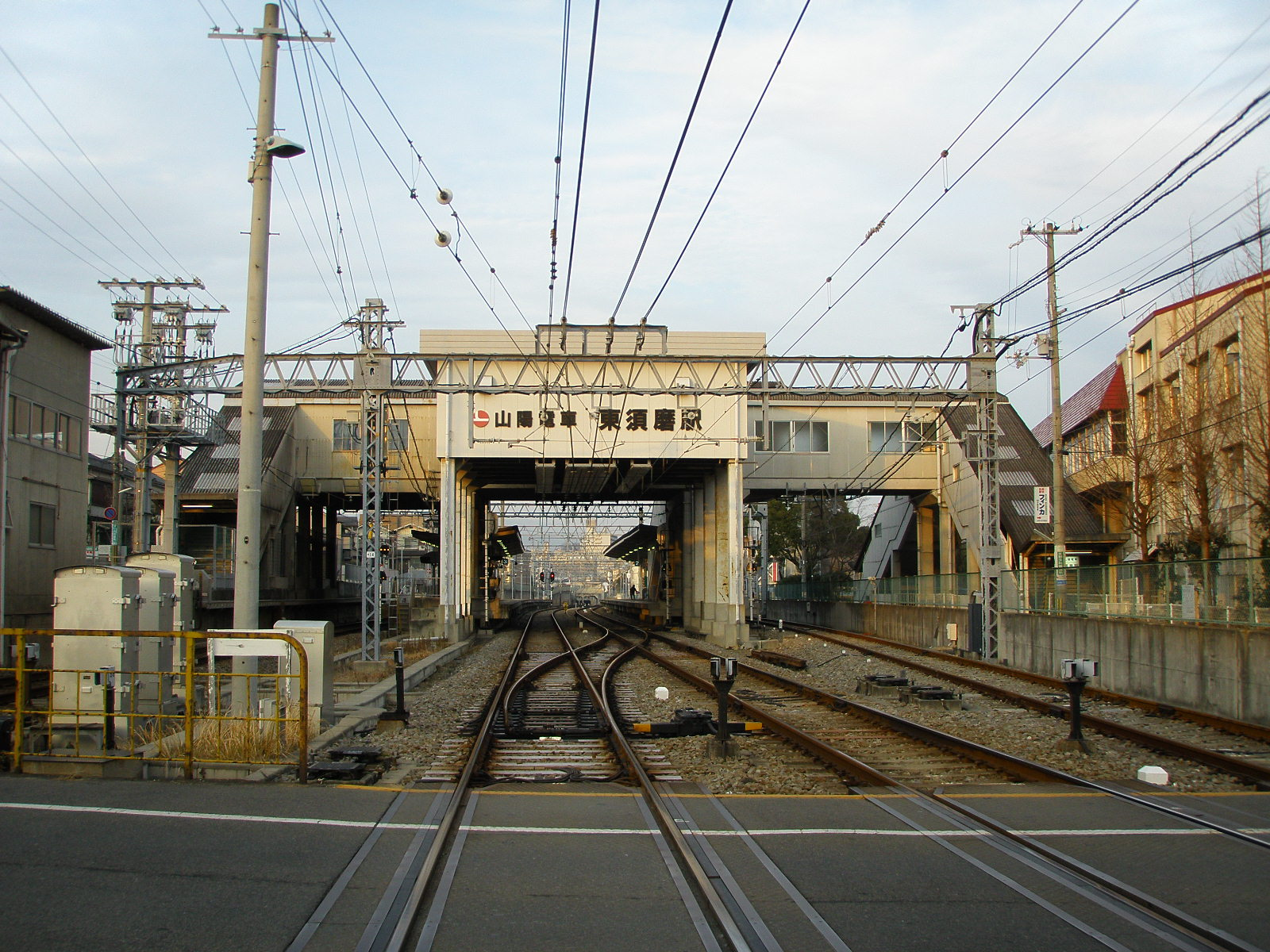
Higashi-Suma Station

Higashi-Suma Station (東須磨駅, Higashi-Suma-eki) is a train station in Suma-ku, Kobe, Hyōgo Prefecture, Japan.

== Lines ==
- Sanyo Electric Railway

- Sanyo Electric Railway Main Line

== Adjacent stations ==
«	Service	»
Sanyo Electric Railway
Sanyo Electric Railway Main Line
Itayado	Sanyo Local	Tsukimiyama
Itayado	Hanshin Local	Tsukimiyama
Itayado	Hanshin Limited Express	Tsukimiyama
Sanyo S Limited Express: Does not stop at this station
Through Limited Express (yellow marking): Does not stop at this station
Through Limited Express (red marking): Does not stop at this station
