= Kenchōmae Station (Hyōgo) =

Metro station in Kobe, Japan

Coordinates: 34°41′27″N 135°11′02″E

Kenchōmae 県庁前
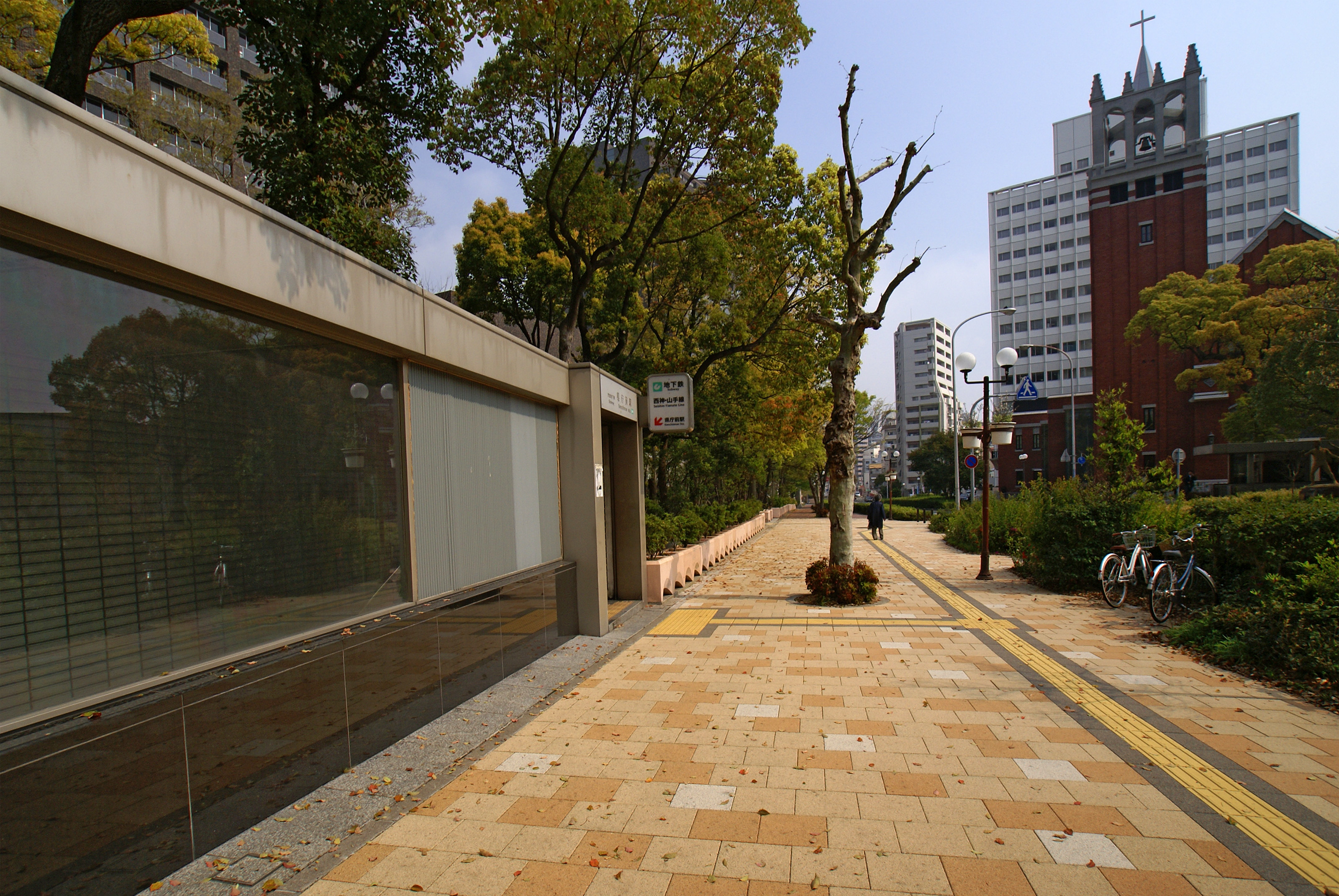
- Station entrance

General information
- System: Kobe Municipal Subway station
- Operator: Kobe Municipal Transportation Bureau
- Line: Seishin-Yamate Line
- Platforms: 2 Split platforms
- Tracks: 2

Construction
- Structure type: Underground
- Accessible: Yes

Other information
- Station code: S04
- Website: Official website

History
- Opened: 1985

Passengers
- 2019: 5,556

Services
Preceding station	Kobe Municipal Subway	Following station
Ōkurayama towards Seishin-Chuo	Seishin-Yamate Line	Sannomiya towards Shin-Kobe
Location
- Location within Kobe Location within Hyōgo Prefecture Location within Japan

Kenchōmae Station (県庁前駅, Kenchōmae-eki) is a railway station in Chūō-ku, Kobe, Hyōgo Prefecture, Japan.

== Lines ==
- Kobe Municipal Subway

- Seishin-Yamate Line Station S04

== Layout ==
Kenchōmae is a split-level station with eastbound trains on the first basement level and westbound trains on the second basement level.

== Passenger statistics ==
In fiscal 2019, the station was used by an average of 5,556 passengers daily (boarding passengers only).

== Surrounding area ==
Motomachi Station on the Kobe Kosoku Line and the JR Kobe Line is located immediately to the north of the station.

== Gallery ==
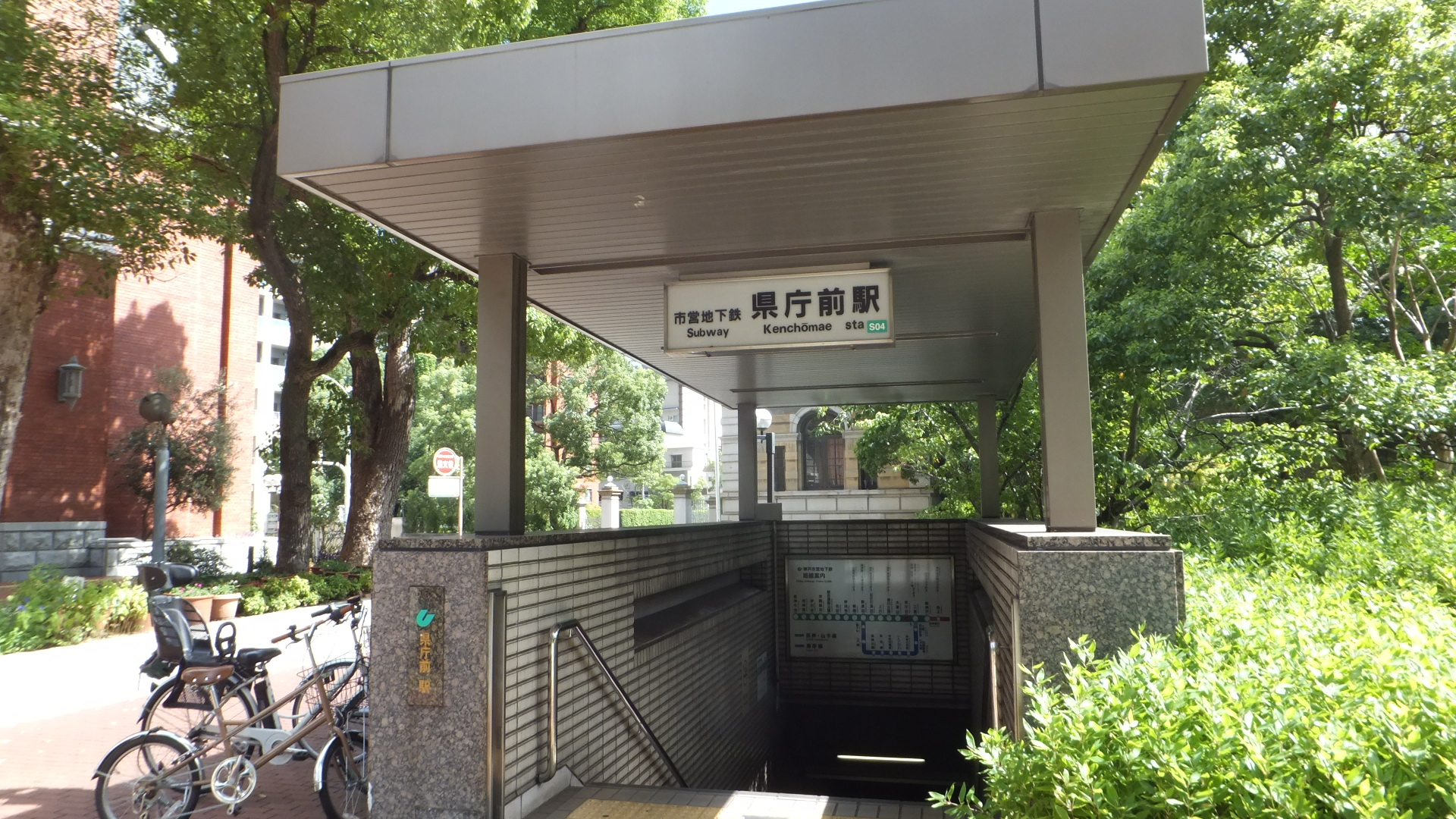
Station entrance №4 in 2014

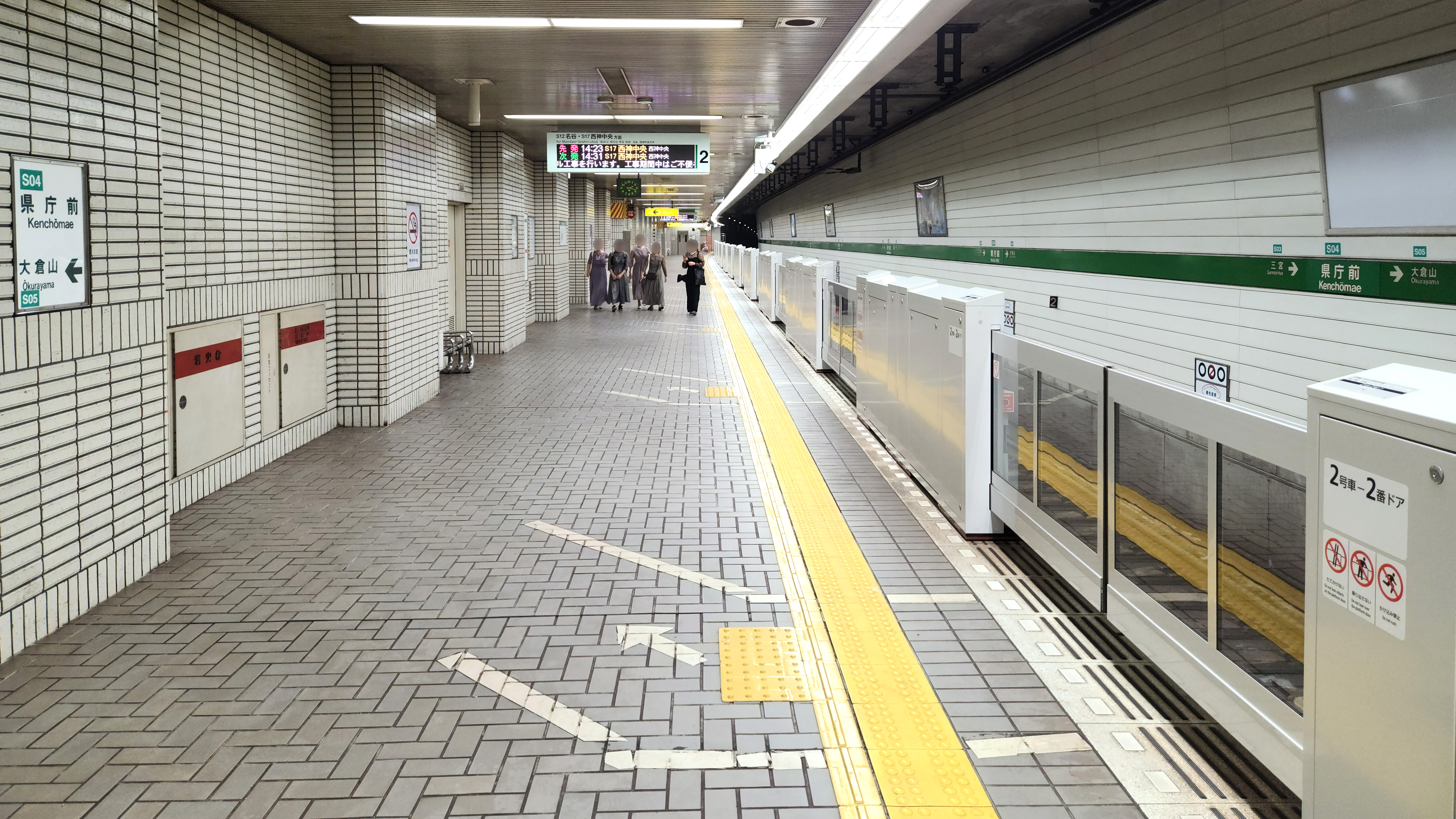
Station platform
