= Tsukimiyama Station =

Railway station in Kobe, Japan

Coordinates: 34.6502°N 135.1219°E

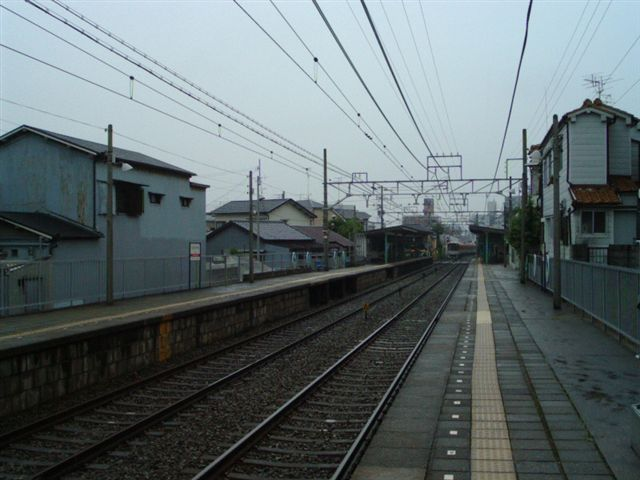
Tsukimiyama Station

Tsukimiyama Station (月見山駅, Tsukimiyama-eki) is a train station in Suma-ku, Kobe, Hyōgo Prefecture, Japan.

== Lines ==
- Sanyo Electric Railway

- Main Line

== Adjacent stations ==
«	Service	»
Sanyo Electric Railway
Main Line
Higashi-Suma	Sanyo Local	Sumadera
Higashi-Suma	Hanshin Local	Sumadera
Higashi-Suma	Hanshin Limited Express	Sumadera
Itayado	Sanyo S Limited Express	Sanyo Suma
Itayado	Through Limited Express (yellow marking)	Sanyo Suma
Itayado	Through Limited Express (red marking)	Sanyo Suma
