= Ōkurayama Station (Hyōgo) =

Metro station in Kobe, Japan

Coordinates: 34°41′05″N 135°10′28″E

Ōkurayama Station 大倉山駅
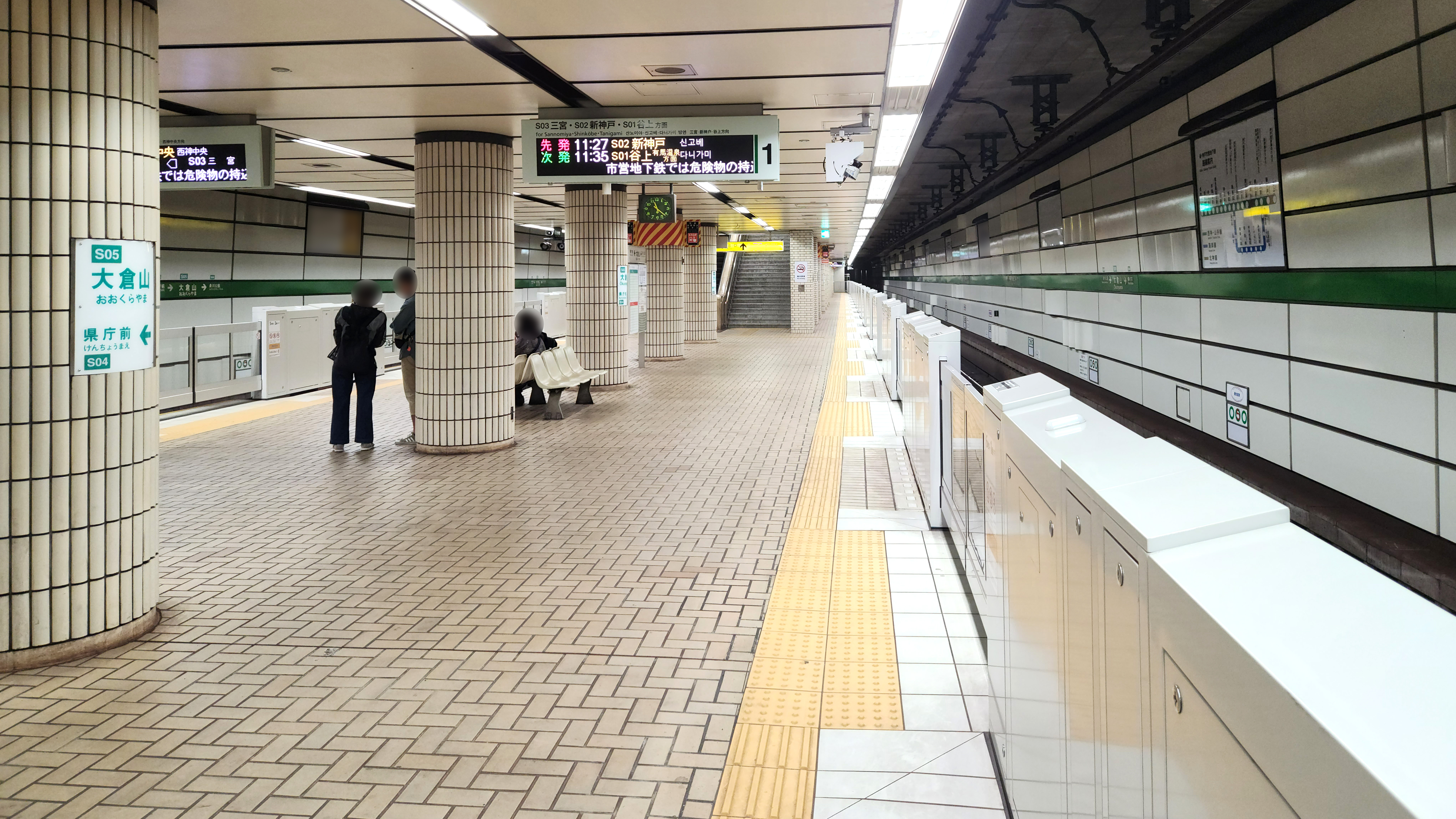
- Station platform

General information
- System: Kobe Municipal Subway station
- Operator: Kobe Municipal Transportation Bureau
- Line: Seishin-Yamate Line

Other information
- Station code: S05

Services
Preceding station	Kobe Municipal Subway	Following station
Minatogawa-Kōen towards Seishin-Chuo	Seishin-Yamate Line	Kenchōmae towards Shin-Kobe
Location
- Location within Kobe Location within Hyōgo Prefecture Location within Japan

Ōkurayama Station (大倉山駅, Ōkurayama-eki) is a railway station in Hyōgo-ku, Kobe, Hyōgo Prefecture, Japan.

== Lines ==
- Kobe Municipal Subway

- Seishin-Yamate Line Station S05

== History ==
The station opened on 17 June 1983.
