= Misaki-Kōen Station (Hyōgo) =

Metro station in Kobe, Japan

Misaki-Kōen Station 御崎公園駅
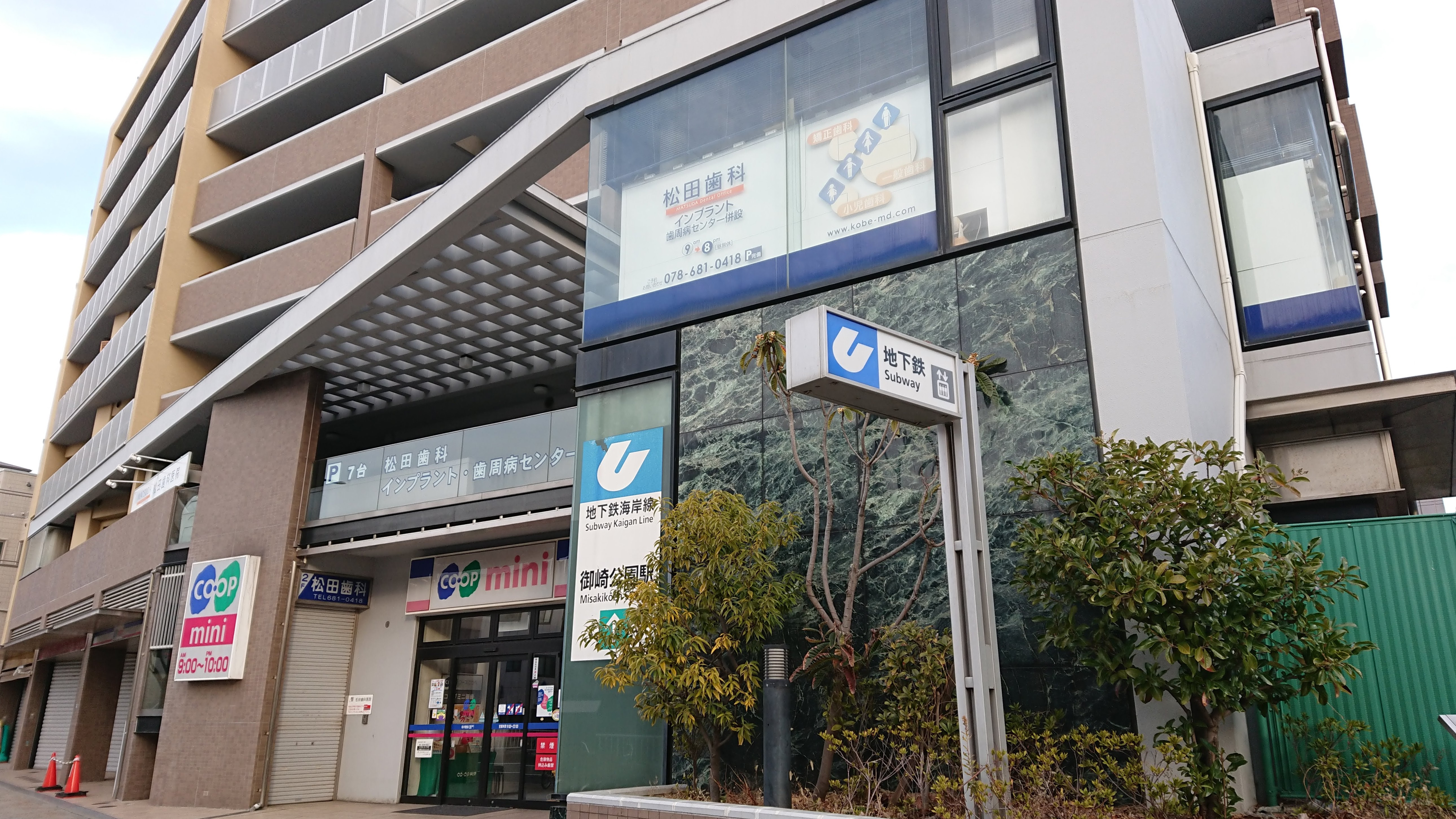
- Exit 2 of the Misaki-Kōen Station

General information
- Location: Kimpeicho Itchome, Hyōgo, Kobe, Hyōgo （神戸市兵庫区金平町一丁目） Japan
- Coordinates: 34°39′16.71″N 135°9′54″E
- System: Kobe Municipal Subway station
- Operator: Kobe Municipal Transportation Bureau
- Line: Kaigan Line
- Platforms: 2 island platforms
- Tracks: 3
- Connections: Bus stop

Other information
- Station code: K07

History
- Opened: 7 June 2001; 25 years ago

Services
Preceding station	Kobe Municipal Subway	Following station
Karumo towards Shin-Nagata	Kaigan Line	Wadamisaki towards Sannomiya-Hanadokeimae
Location
- Location within Kobe Location within Hyōgo Prefecture Location within Japan

Misaki-Kōen Station (御崎公園駅, Misaki-Kōen-eki) is a train station in Hyōgo-ku, Kobe, Hyōgo Prefecture, Japan.

== Layout ==
The station has 2 island platforms serving 3 tracks.

1, 2	■ Kaigan Line	for Sannomiya-Hanadokeimae

3, 4	■ Kaigan Line	for Shin-Nagata

== Surroundings ==
- Misaki Park
  - Misaki Park Stadium (Noevir Stadium Kobe)
- Misaki Depot
- Nitori
- Yamada Denki
- Kobe Century Memorial Hospital
- Kawasaki Heavy Industries Rolling Stock Company

== Bus ==
Kobe City Bus bus stops (Yoshidacho Nichome, Kimpeicho)

- Route 3: to Yoshidacho Itchome
- Route 3: for Higashi-Shiriike Itchome, Chiketetsu-Nagata-ekimae, and Naguracho
- Route 3: for Wadamisaki, Shinkaichi, Yumenocho, and Naguracho

== Gallery ==
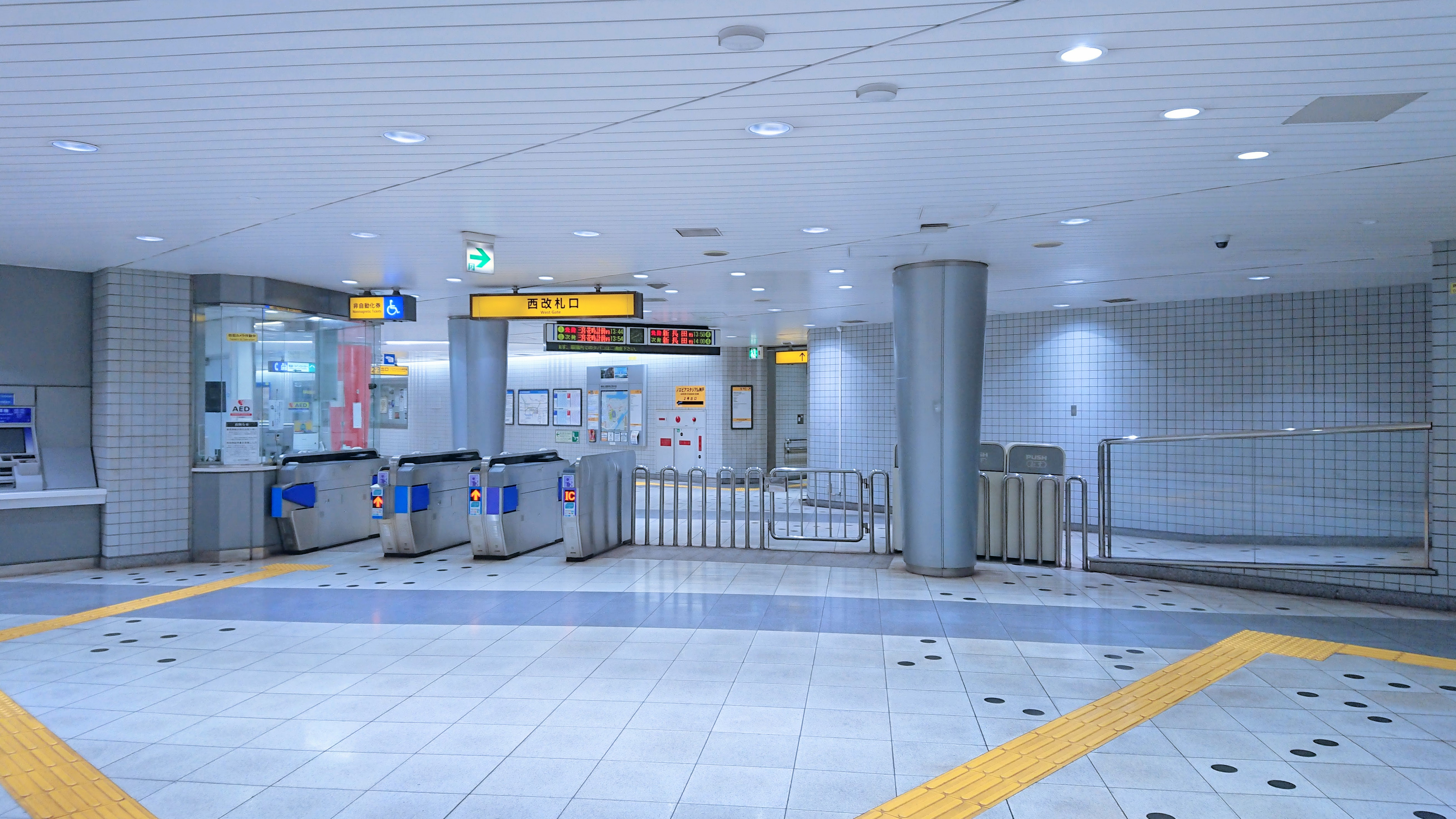
Fare Gates

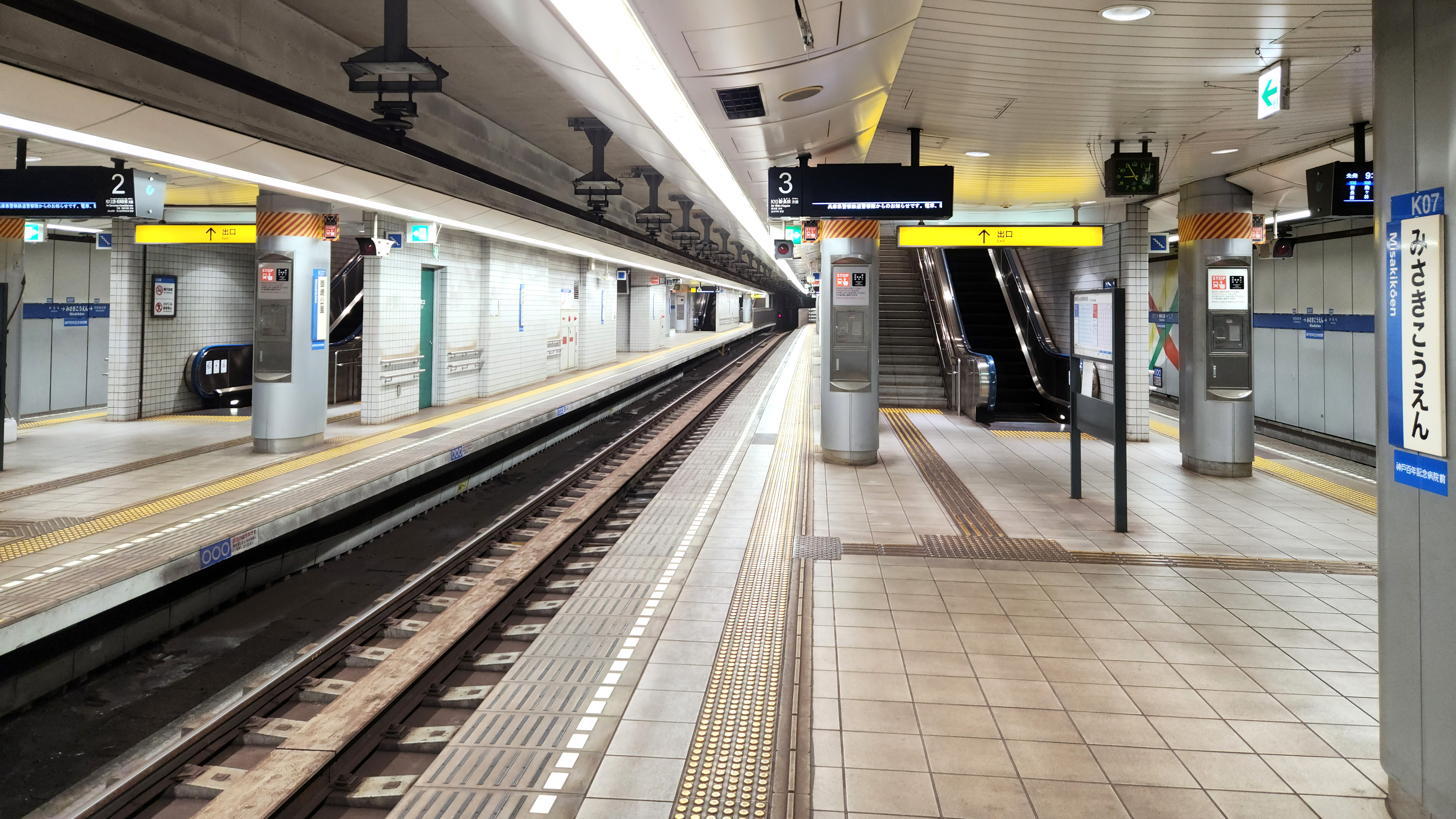
Central track serving platforms 2 and 3

== History ==
Misaki-Kōen Station was opened on 7 June 2001.
