= Kobe Municipal Subway =

Subway system in Kobe, Japan

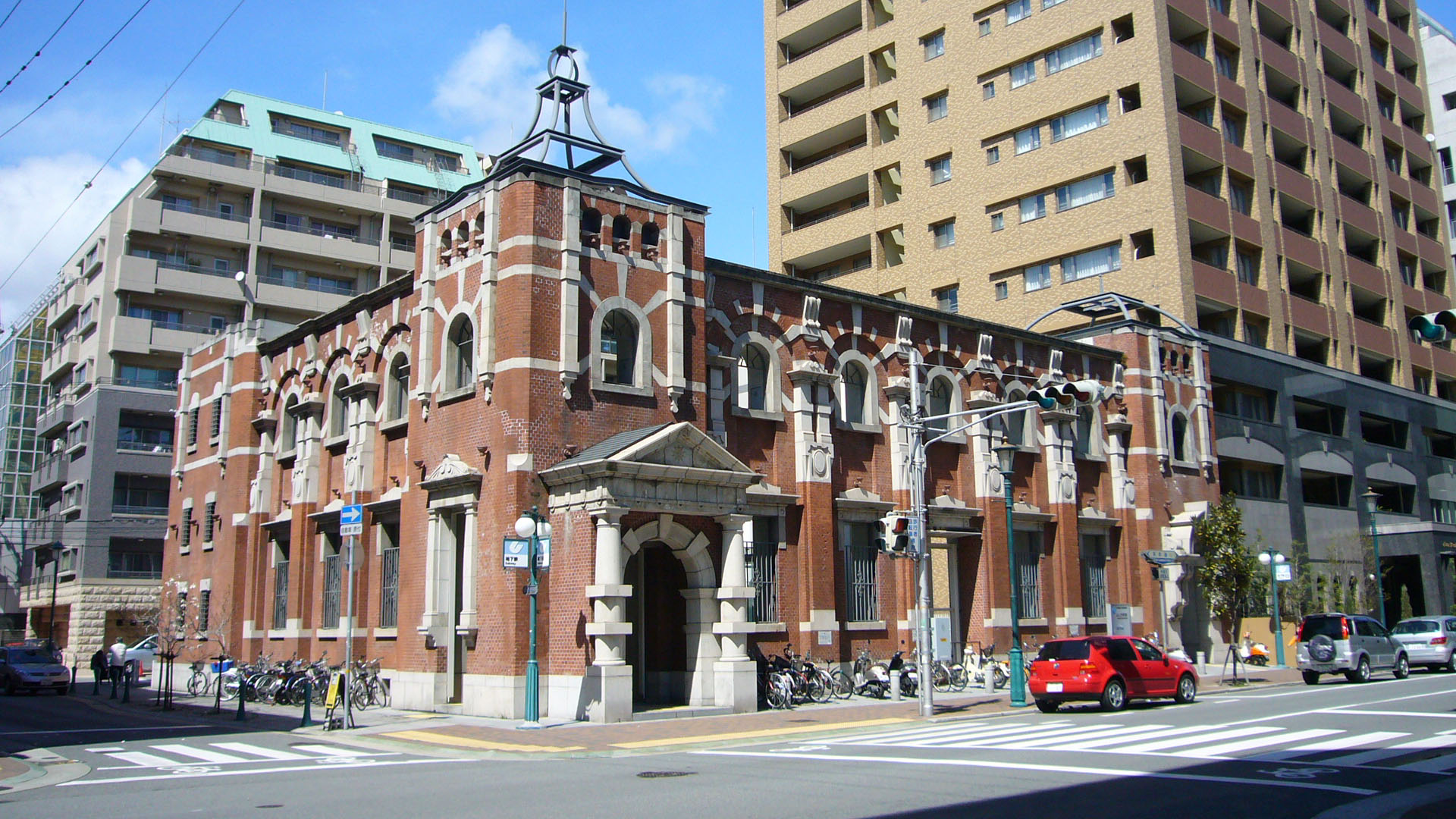
- Minatomotomachi Station

Overview
- Native name: 神戸市営地下鉄
- Locale: Kobe, Hyogo, Japan
- Transit type: Rapid transit
- Number of lines: 3
- Number of stations: 28

Operation
- Began operation: March 13, 1977; 49 years ago
- Operator: Kobe Municipal Transportation Bureau

Technical
- System length: 38.1 km (23.67 mi)
- Track gauge: 1,435 mm (4 ft 8 1/2 in) standard gauge
- Electrification: 1,500 V DC overhead catenary
- Top speed: 90 km/h (56 mph) (Seishin-Yamate Line); 70 km/h (43 mph) (Kaigan Line)

The Kobe Municipal Subway (Kobe City Subway) (神戸市営地下鉄, Kōbe-shiei chikatetsu) is a rapid transit network serving the city of Kobe in Hyōgo Prefecture, Japan, and forms a key element of the city’s urban transportation system. Operated by the Kobe Municipal Transportation Bureau, the subway began service on March 13, 1977, replacing portions of the former streetcar network. Since its opening, the system has expanded to provide vital connections across central, coastal, and northern Kobe, with integrated transfers to JR rail services, bus routes, and the Shinkansen at major interchange stations such as Sannomiya and Shin-Kobe.

The network comprises three lines. The Seishin–Yamate Line runs for 22.7 kilometres between Seishin-chūō and Shin-Kobe, serving 16 stations. The Kaigan Line, branded as Yumekamome, is a fully automated route extending 7.9 kilometres from Shin-Nagata to Sannomiya-Hanadokeimae and includes 10 stations. The Hokushin Line provides a 7.6-kilometre extension from Shin-Kobe to Tanigami with two stations; it was incorporated into the municipal subway network in June 2020 after previously being operated by a private railway company. Collectively, the three lines cover approximately 38 kilometres and serve 26 stations, with transfer points at locations such as Shin-Kobe and Shin-Nagata enabling efficient interchange.

The system was designed with an emphasis on universal accessibility, incorporating features such as elevators, tactile paving, and step-free access throughout stations. Operational safety and efficiency have also been priorities, including a program to install platform screen doors at all stations, which began in 2017. In recent years, the subway has carried approximately 325,000 passengers per day on its main lines, supporting Kobe’s economic activity by linking residential areas with business districts and major destinations, including the historic port area and the foothills of Mount Rokko. User convenience has been further enhanced through the introduction of contactless fare payment systems from 2024.

== History ==
In 1928, a plan to establish the Kobe Underground Railway Co., Ltd. (神戸地下鉄道 株式会社) was proposed by influential figures in Kobe’s financial circles, including Gisaku Takikawa and Naokichi Kaneko. The proposal was presented to the city council on March 31 of the same year, and an investigative committee was formed to examine it. The committee subsequently issued a five-point report, which included the conclusion that private subway construction would impede the city’s subway plans, leading to the rejection of the proposal.

Following World War II, Kobe’s urban planning placed increasing emphasis on upgrading transportation infrastructure to cope with rising traffic congestion resulting from rapid motorization and population growth, particularly in the city’s western and northern areas. The streetcar system, which had operated since 1910, became progressively less efficientsponse, municipal planners revisited proposals for an underground railway that had first been considered in the 1920s, shifting focus toward a high-capacity subway network. This approach was intended to replace streetcar services and improve links between central Kobe and newly developed districts s by the late 1960s, as growing automobile use reduced operating speeds and led to declining patronage. In reuch as Seishin New Town, in line with recommendations issued by the Kobe City Transportation Business Council in June 1968.

Formal planning progressed with the granting of a local railway business license on October 15, 1971, under the Local Railway Act, authorizing construction of an initial 13.6 km (8.5 mi) section between Nishinomiya and Shin-Kobe. This approval marked the official launch of the Seishin Line project. Construction began on November 25, 1972, which was designed to relieve congestion in heavily populated districts. The start of subway construction closely followed the complete closure of Kobe’s streetcar network on March 13, 1971, reinforcing the subway’s role as the city’s primary mode of urban rail transport.

=== Line openings and expansions ===
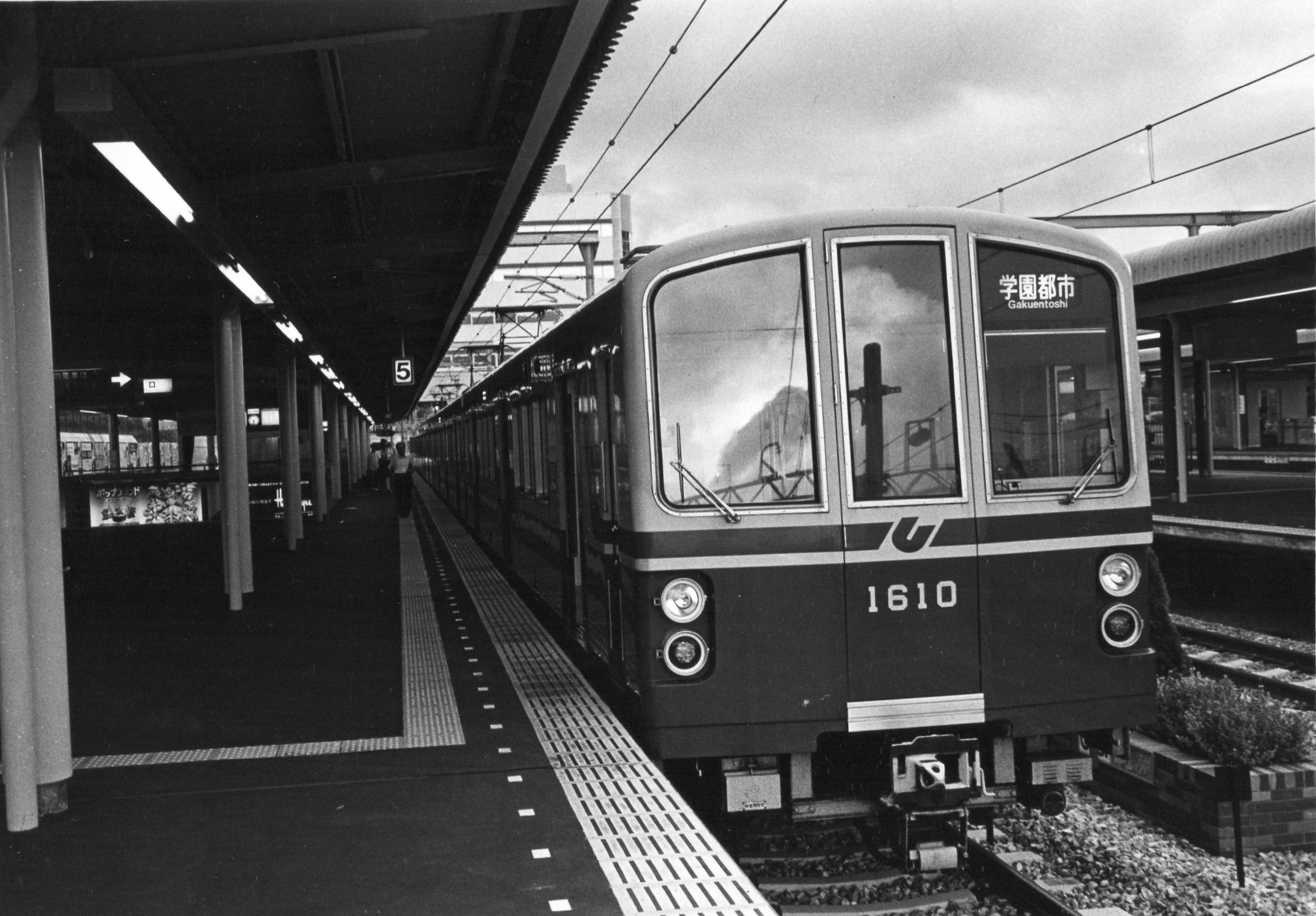
A 1000 series at the Tanigami Station in 1988.

The Seishin Line line opened on March 13, 1977, running for 5.7 km (3.5 mi) between Myōdani and Shin-Nagata stations. A second line, the Yamate Line, opened on June 17, 1983, running for 4.3 km (2.7 mi) between Shin-Nagata and Ōkurayama stations. On June 18, 1985, the Yamate Line was extended to Shin-Kobe and the Seishin Line was extended to Gakuen-toshi. When the final stage of the Seishin Line, an extension to Seishin-Chuo, opened on March 18, 1987, the Seishin Line and the Yamate Line were merged into the Seishin-Yamate Line.

The Hokushin Kyūkō Electric Railway opened the 7.5 km (4.7 mi) Hokushin Line extension between Shin-Kobe and Tanigami on April 2, 1988; services on the Hokushin Line have through service onto the Seishin-Yamate Line.

On January 17, 1995, the Seishin-Yamate Line was damaged in the Great Hanshin earthquake. The day after the earthquake, limited services resumed between Seishin-Chuo and Itayado; full service was restored to the entire line in March 1995 after repairs were completed.

On July 7, 2001, the 7.9 km (4.9 mi) long Kaigan Line opened between Sannomiya-hanadokeimae and Shin-Nagata. The line's opening was delayed from 1999 due to construction issues stemming from the Great Hanshin earthquake.

On June 1, 2020, Hokushin Line was transferred to Kobe Municipal Subway.

== Lines ==
Line	Color	Symbol	Mark	Opened	Last extension	Termini	Length km/miles	Stations
Hokushin Line	Brown		S	1988	—N/a	Tanigami – Shin-Kobe	7.5 (4.7)	2 (Note: Including Tanigami Station and Shin-Kobe Station)
Hokushin Line	Green		S					
Seishin-Yamate Line (former Yamate Line)	Green		S	1983	1985	Shin-Kobe – Shin‑Nagata	7.6 (4.7)	8 (Note: Including Shin-Kobe Station and Shin-Nagata Station)
Seishin-Yamate Line (former Seishin Line)	Green		S	1977	—N/a	Shin‑Nagata – Myodani	5.7 (3.5)	4 (Note: Including Shin-Nagata Station and Myodani Station)
Seishin-Yamate Line (former Seishin-enshin Line)	Green		S	1985	1987	Myodani – Seishin‑Chuo	9.4 (5.8)	6 (Note: Including Myodani Station)
Kaigan Line (Yumekamome)	Blue		K	2001	—N/a	Sannomiya-Hanadokei-mae – Shin-Nagata	7.9 (4.9)	10

All trains on Hokushin Line operate a through service to/from Seishin-Chuo on the Seishin-Yamate Line. Kobe City Transportation Bureau refers to the two lines as the combined "Seishin-Yamate Line / Hokushin Line".

=== Hokushin Line ===
The Hokushin Line is a short north–south subway route, extending approximately 7.5 kilometers between Tanigami Station in Kita Ward and Shin-Kobe Station in Chūō Ward. Despite its limited length, the line plays a crucial role in linking Kobe’s northern suburban areas with the city center, providing a fast and reliable commuter corridor. Operationally, the Hokushin Line functions as an extension of the Seishin–Yamate Line, with all trains running through Shin-Kobe Station without requiring passenger transfers.

Tanigami Station serves as an important interchange with the Kobe Electric Railway Arima Line, offering direct access to northern destinations such as Arima Onsen and Sanda. Shin-Kobe Station, the southern terminus, is a major transportation hub, providing connections to the Sanyō Shinkansen for high-speed travel to cities including Osaka and Hiroshima, as well as onward access to central and western Kobe via the Seishin–Yamate Line.

The line was integrated into the Kobe Municipal Subway system on June 1, 2020, following its transfer from the private Hokushin Kyūkō Electric Railway.

=== Seishin-Yamate Line ===
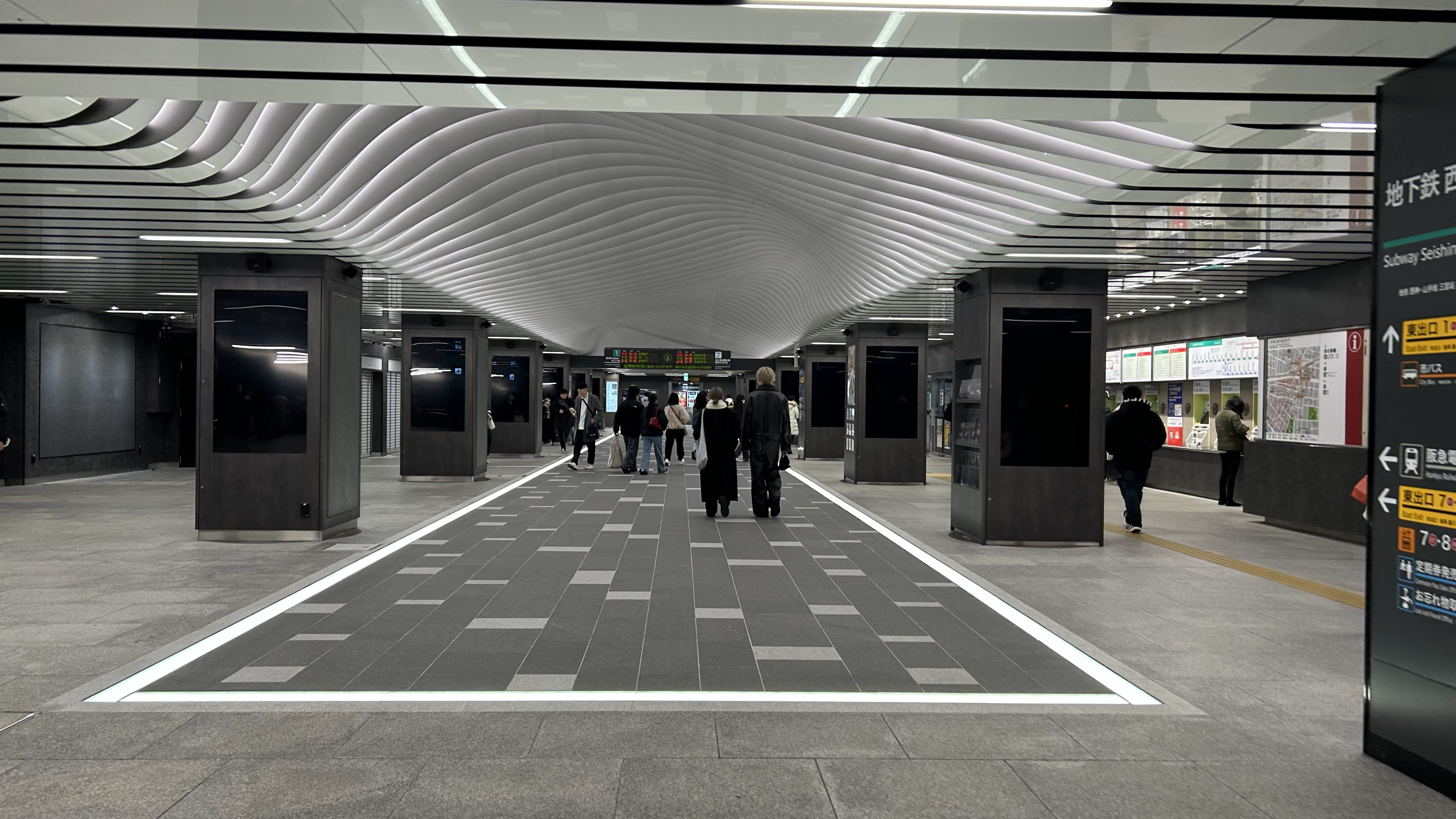
Sannomiya Station

The Seishin–Yamate Line functions as the primary trunk route of the Kobe Municipal Subway, extending 22.7 km from Shin-Kobe Station in the northern part of the city to Seishin-Chūō Station in the southwest, while passing through central districts including Sannomiya, the city’s principal commercial and transportation hub. This alignment establishes the line as a key east–west urban axis, linking Kobe’s central business areas with expanding residential suburbs in the western part of the city.

When northern through-running sections are included, the total operational route length reaches 30.2 km The line consists of a combination of underground and elevated infrastructure, with the elevated section between Myōdani and Seishin-Chūō specifically designed to support suburban development while reducing construction costs and surface disruption in lower-density areas.

All services operate as all-stations local trains along a single main route without branch operations, prioritizing consistent stopping patterns and operational simplicity. Trains run at a maximum operating speed of 90 km/h, balancing travel efficiency with safety across the line’s varied topography. During peak periods, headways range from 3 to 5 minutes, providing high-frequency service to accommodate commuter demand.

=== Kaigan Line ===
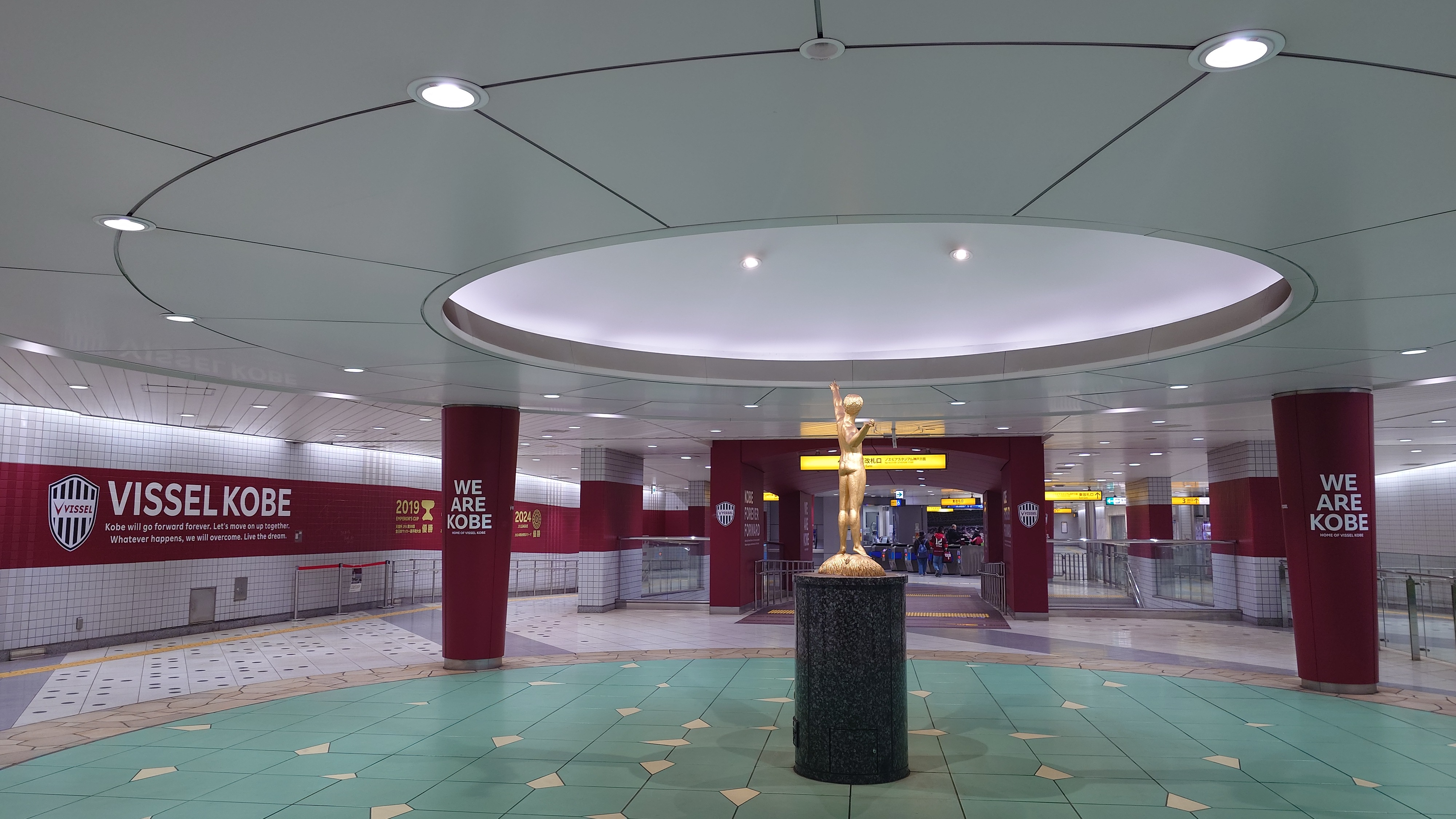
Misaki-Kōen Station Central Square

The Kaigan Line links central Sannomiya with the Harborland district and other waterfront areas, providing convenient access to tourist attractions, commercial developments, and adjacent residential neighborhoods. It is fully automated and employs linear induction motor propulsion, enabling driverless operation with reduced noise and vibration, well suited to its predominantly underground, urban coastal alignment.

As a fully automated, driverless system, the Kaigan Line enhances urban mobility by linking key economic, residential, and leisure districts along Kobe’s waterfront. The line supports both tourism and daily commuting through frequent, high-reliability service, with trains operating at a maximum speed of 70 km/h and peak-hour headways of approximately 4 to 6 minutes.

At its termini, the Kaigan Line provides direct connections to the broader Kobe Municipal Subway network, enabling efficient transfers for citywide travel, while its coastal alignment offers occasional views of the harbor environment that distinguish it from inland subway routes.

== Stations ==
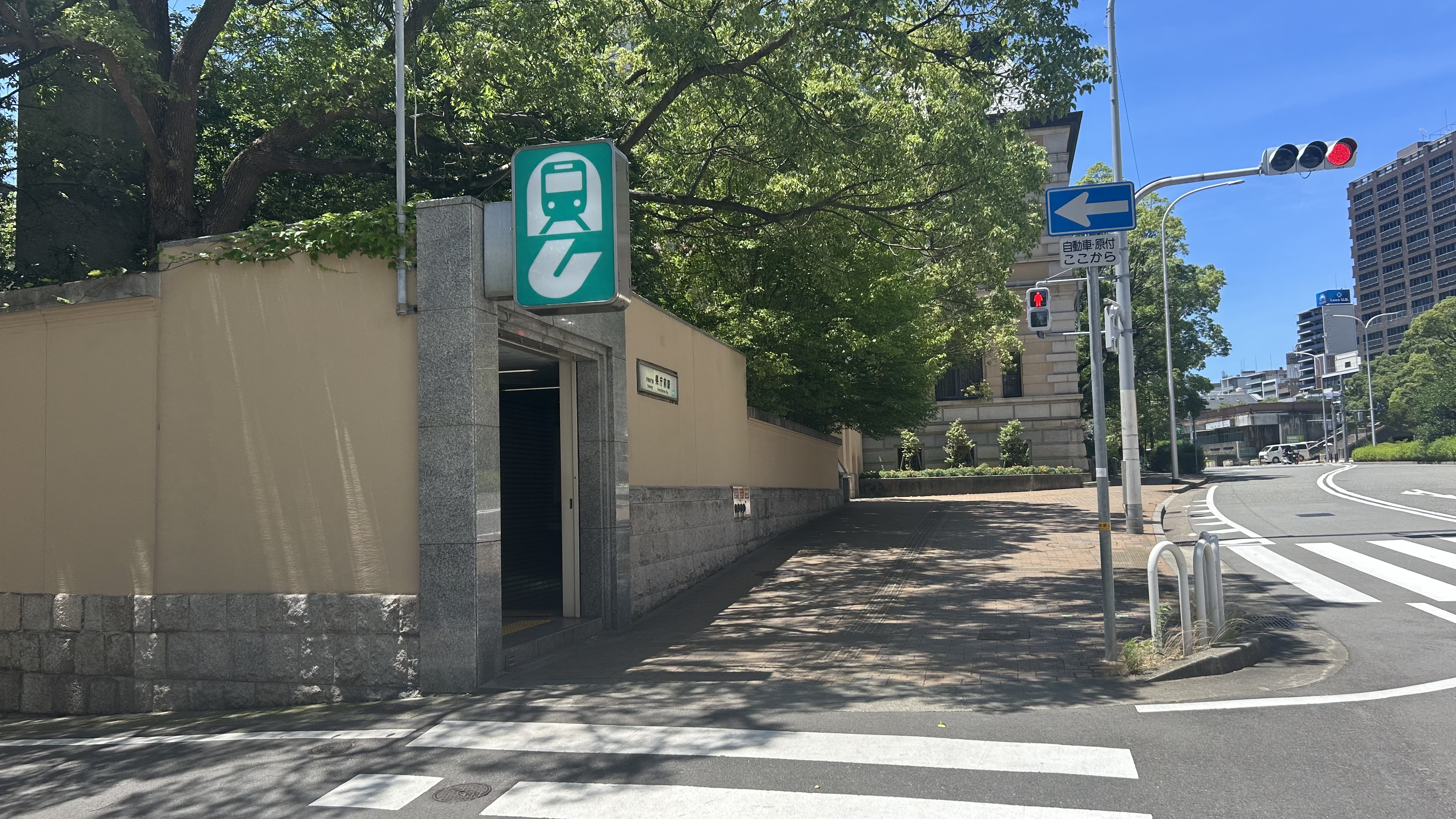
Exit of Kenchōmae Station, located in front of the Hyōgo Prefectural Government Building

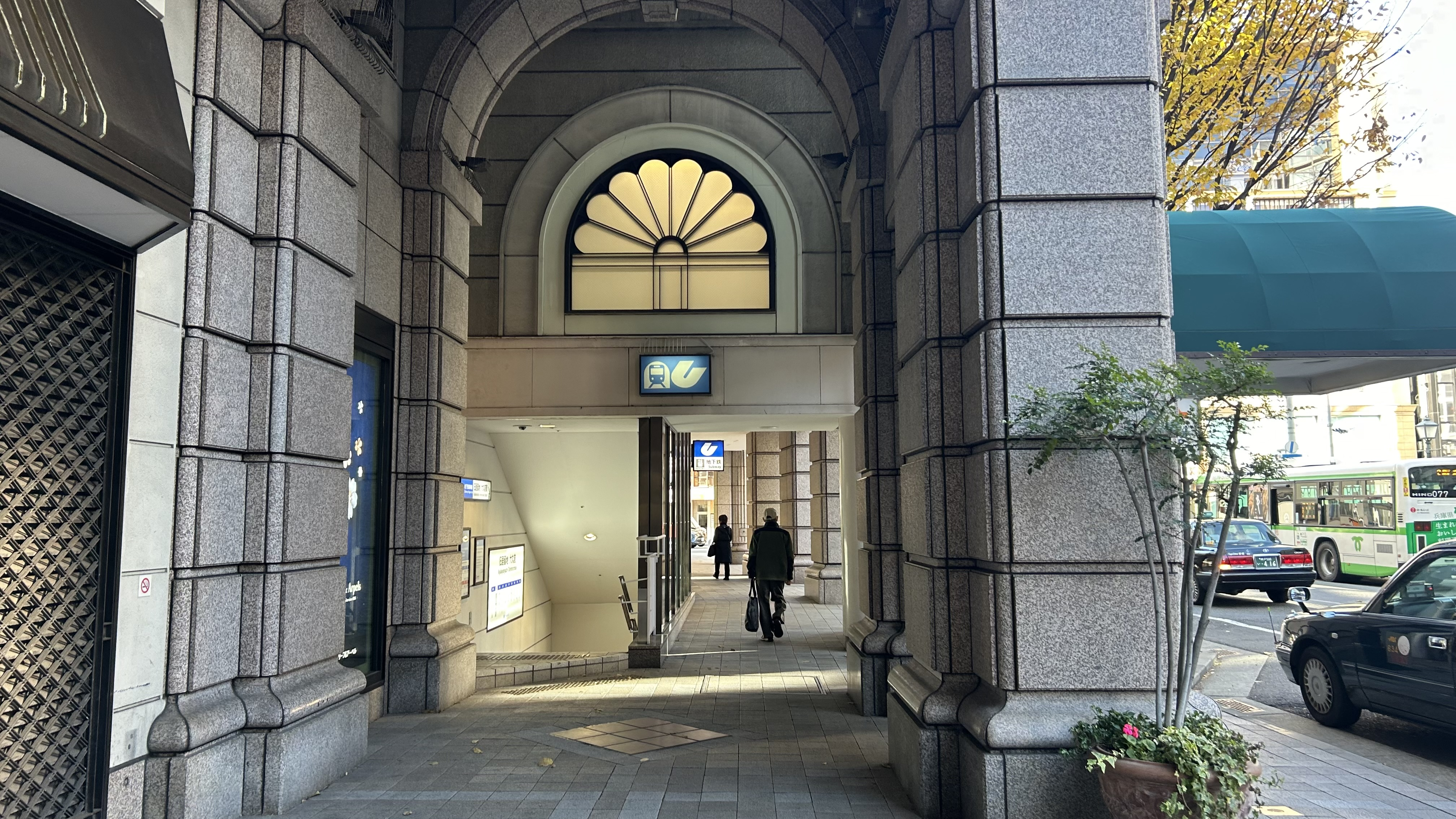
Entrance to Kyūkyoryūchi-Daimarumae Station directly connected to the Daimaru Kobe department store Building.

The Kobe Municipal Subway comprises a network totaling 38.1 km across three lines serving 28 stations. The infrastructure features a combination of underground and elevated sections, with approximately one-third of the original network underground as of the mid-1990s expansions, though subsequent developments have incorporated additional subsurface tunneling for urban integration.

Accessibility improvements have been implemented across the entire Kobe Municipal Subway network, including the installation of elevators, escalators, tactile paving, and step-free platform access. The Kaigan Line incorporated many of these barrier-free features from its opening in 2001, reflecting contemporary universal design standards, while additional upgrades were carried out system-wide throughout the 2000s in line with national barrier-free transportation policies.

=== Fares ===
The Kobe Municipal Subway employs a distance-based fare system, with a base fare of ¥210 for trips of up to three stations. Fares increase incrementally according to travel distance, reaching a maximum of approximately ¥340 for the longest journeys within the network. This fare structure is applied uniformly across the Seishin–Yamate, Hokushin, and Kaigan lines, and fare tables are clearly displayed at stations to simplify use for passengers.

Fare payment is fully integrated with Japan’s nationwide contactless IC card systems, including ICOCA and Suica, in both physical and mobile formats. These cards enable automatic distance-based fare calculation and seamless transfers to connecting railways such as JR West and Hankyu, eliminating the need for separate tickets and effectively reducing costs for multimodal journeys, for example, transfers between the subway and JR lines at Sannomiya Station. Additional interoperable IC cards accepted across the system include PASMO, Kitaca, manaca, TOICA, nimoca, hayakaken, and SUGOCA, all usable at fare gates without surcharges for intra-system travel.

== Rolling stock ==
=== Current vehicles ===
All lines utilize a standard track gauge of 1,435 mm to ensure compatibility and efficient operations. The entire system is electrified with a 1,500 V DC overhead catenary system, providing consistent power supply for train propulsion. Signaling relies on automatic train control (ATC) systems, enabling precise speed regulation and safe interval management across the routes.

==== Seishin-Yamate Line／Hokushin Line ====
- 6000 series

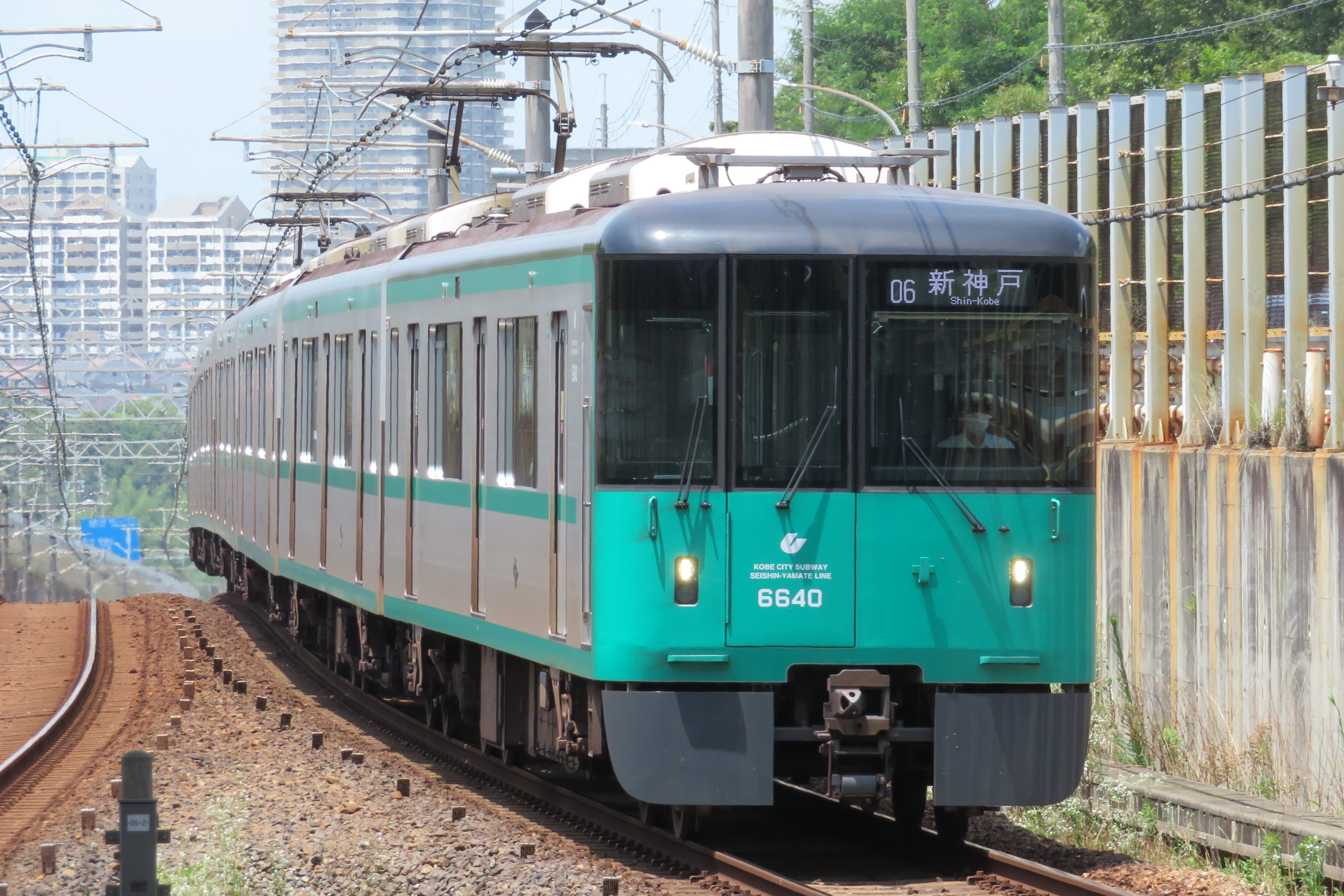
6000 series

The Seishin–Yamate and Hokushin lines are currently operated using 6000 series electric multiple units, which form the standard rolling stock for these routes. Introduced into revenue service in February 2019, the 6000 series represents a comprehensive modernization of the fleet, emphasizing energy efficiency, passenger comfort, and universal accessibility.

Key technological upgrades include full LED interior and exterior lighting, silicon carbide (SiC) semiconductor inverters that reduce electrical losses, and regenerative braking systems that improve overall energy efficiency. The car bodies are constructed from corrosion-resistant aluminum alloy with a double-skin structure and an unpainted hairline finish, reducing long-term maintenance requirements while maintaining structural rigidity. Each six-car train has a total capacity of approximately 808 passengers, including 272 seated, and operates at a maximum speed of 90 km/h.

==== Kaigan Line ====
- 5000 series

The Kaigan Line is operated exclusively by 5000 series electric multiple units, which have served as the line’s standard rolling stock since the commencement of operations on July 7, 2001. Purpose-built for the Kaigan Line’s coastal alignment, these trains are configured in four-car formations, with a total of 10 trainsets (40 cars) in service.

The vehicles feature lightweight, corrosion-resistant aluminum alloy bodies, reflecting design considerations for operation in a marine environment and compatibility with the line’s relatively compact stations. Propulsion is provided by a linear induction motor system, which reduces mechanical noise and vibration by eliminating conventional rotary motor drive, resulting in a quieter and smoother ride well suited to the waterfront corridor.

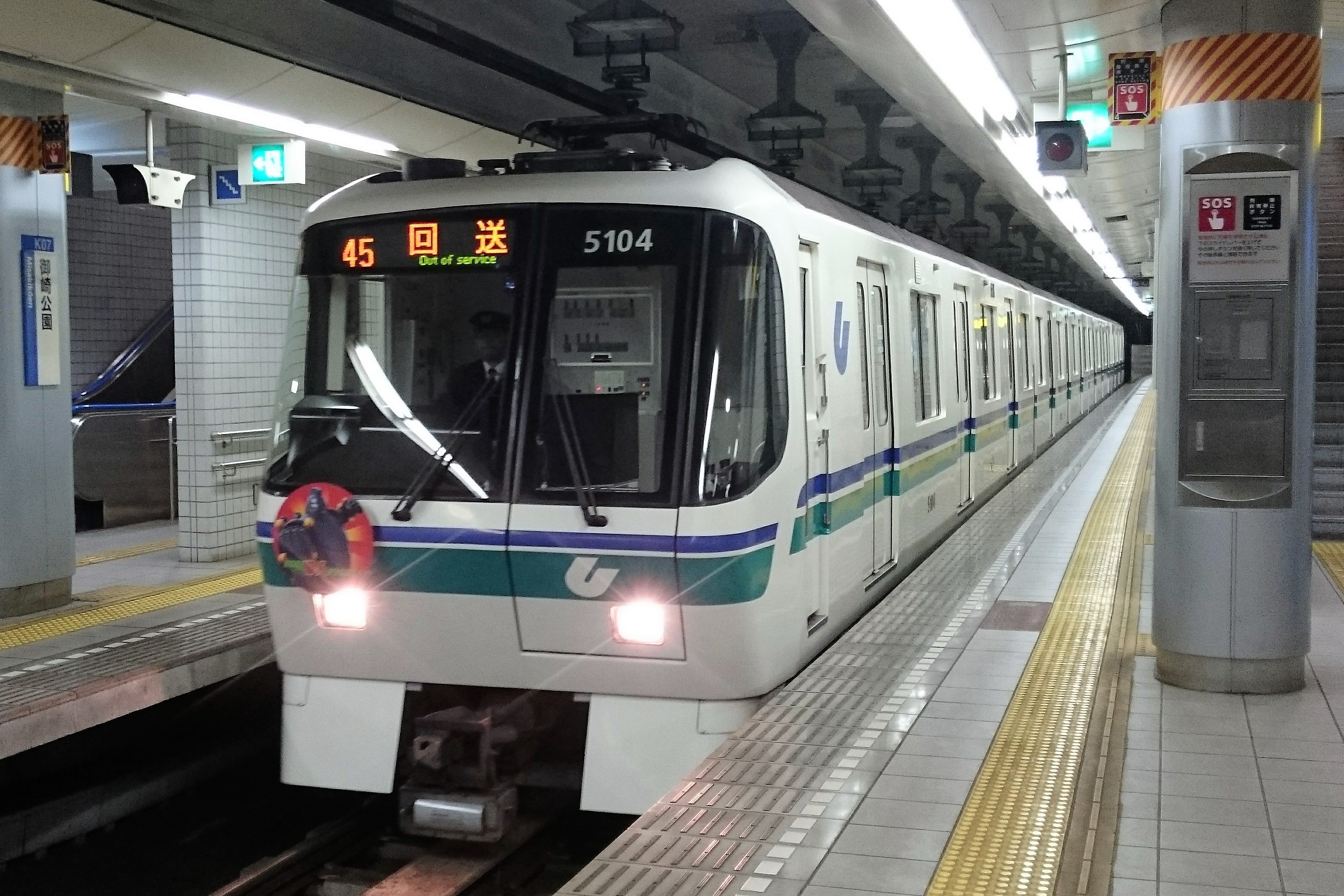
5000 series

=== Former vehicles ===
==== Seishin-Yamate Line／Hokushin Line ====
- 1000 series
- 2000 series
- 3000 series
- 7000 series（7000-A series）

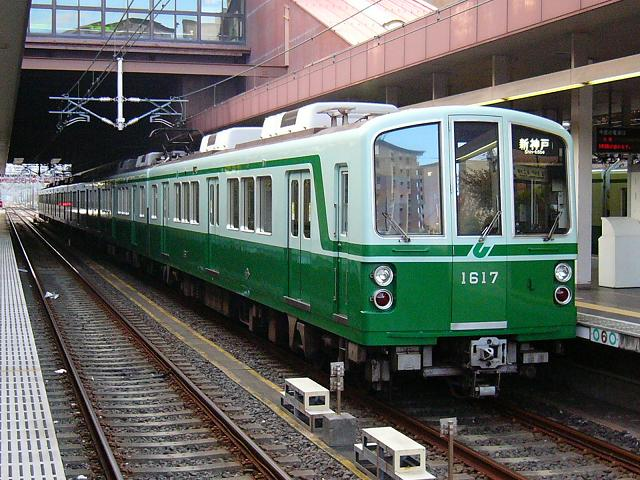
1000 series

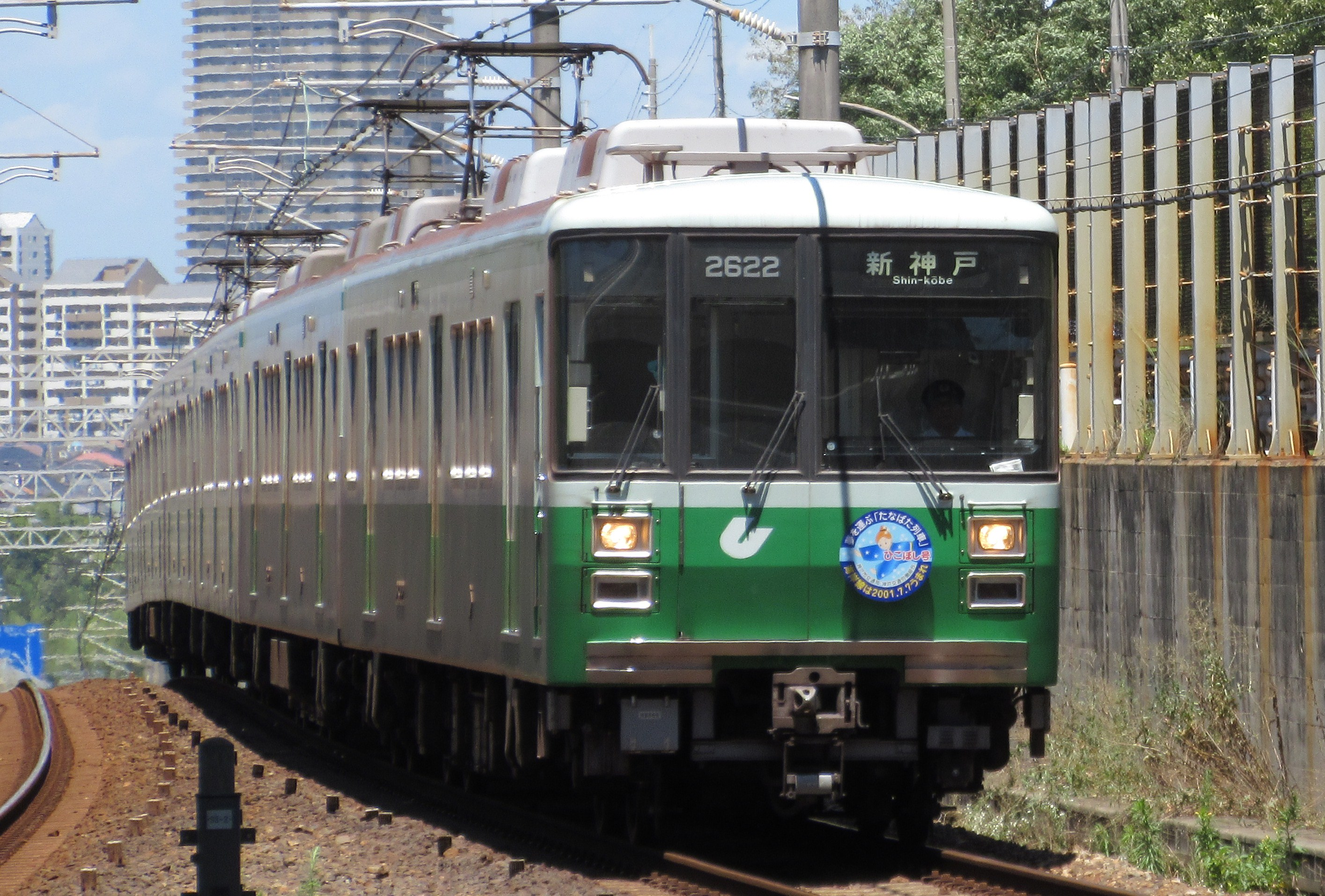
2000 series

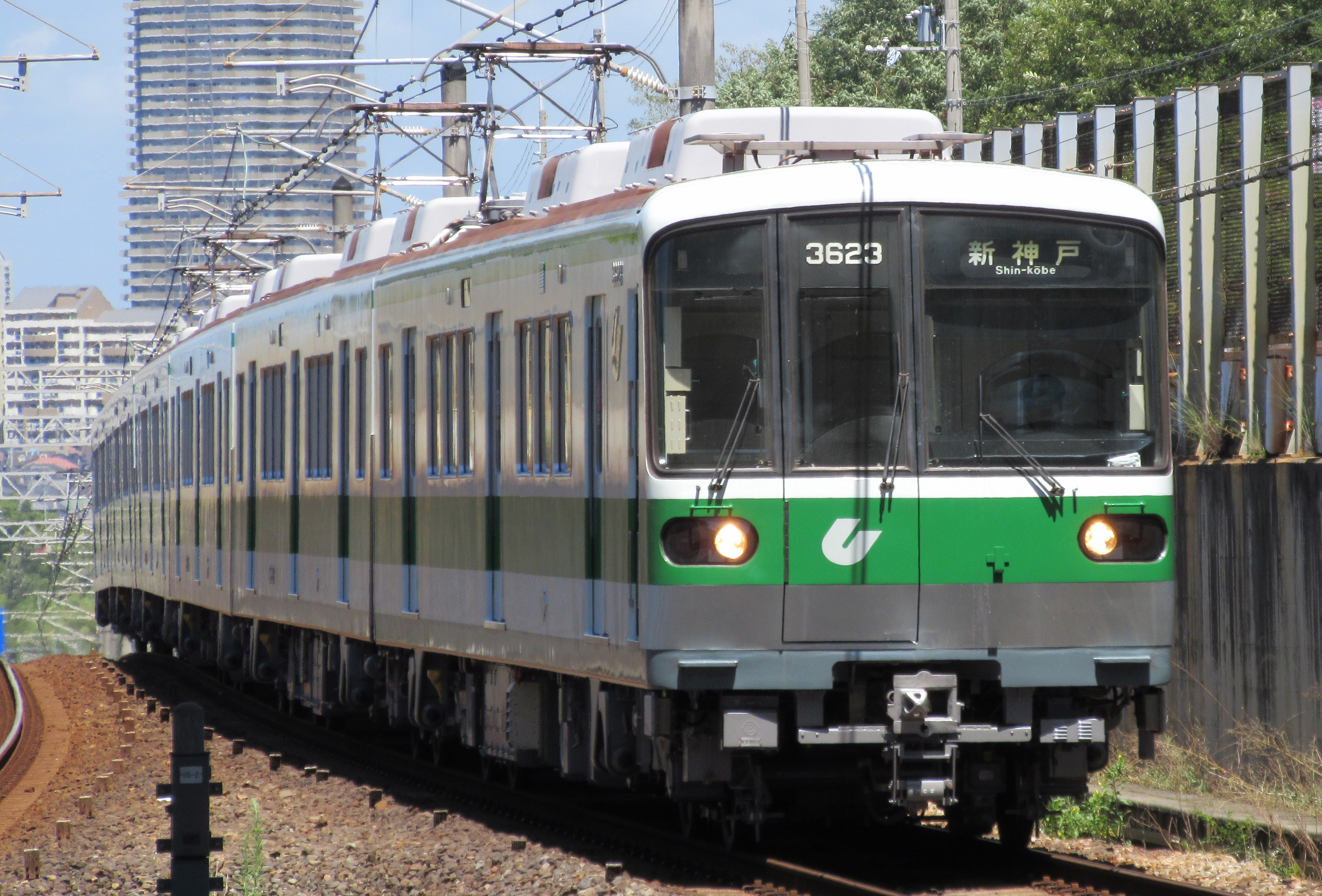
3000 series

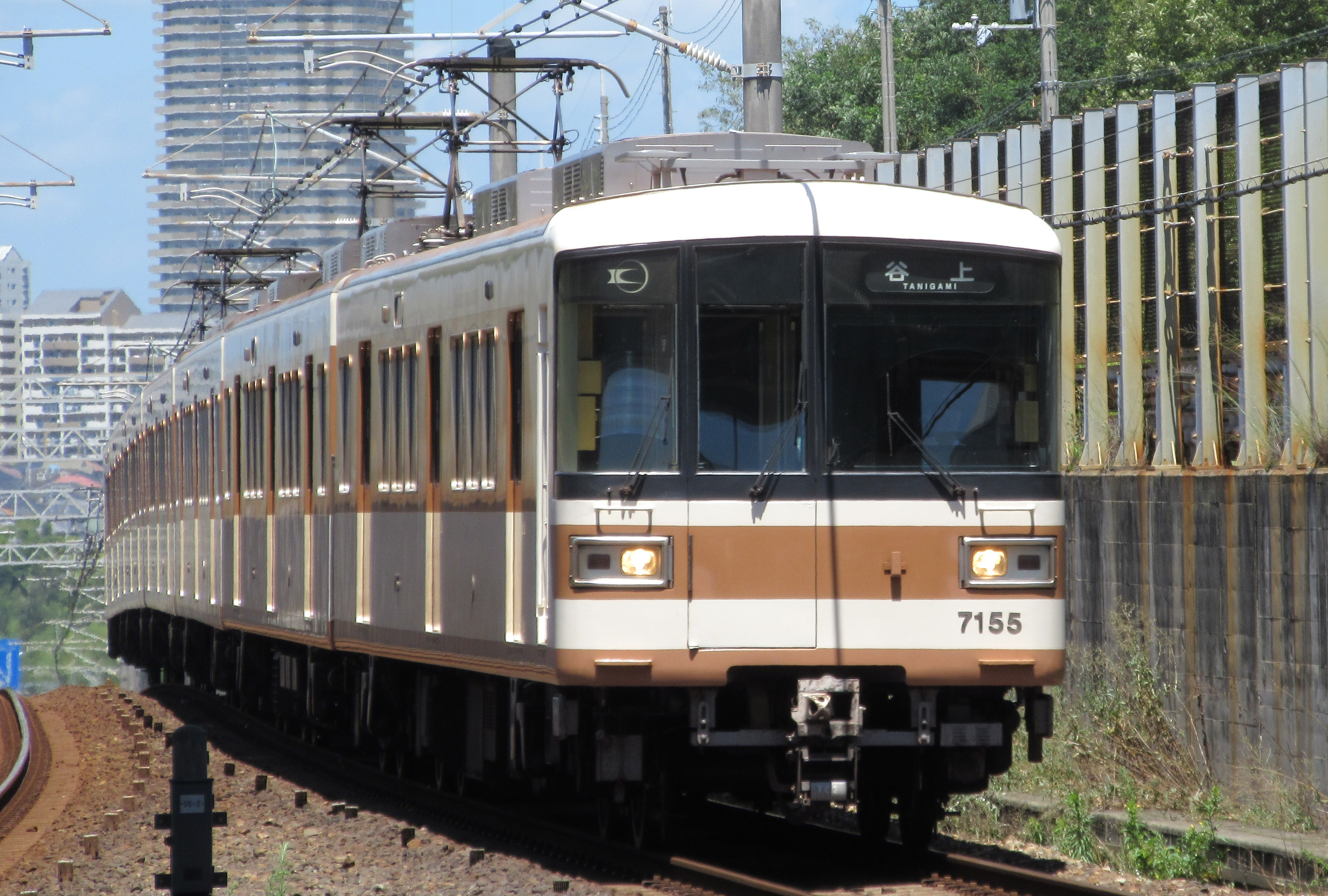
7000 series

== See also ==
- List of metro systems
