= Daimon Station (Hiroshima) =

Railway station in Fukuyama, Hiroshima Prefecture, Japan

Daimon Station 大門駅
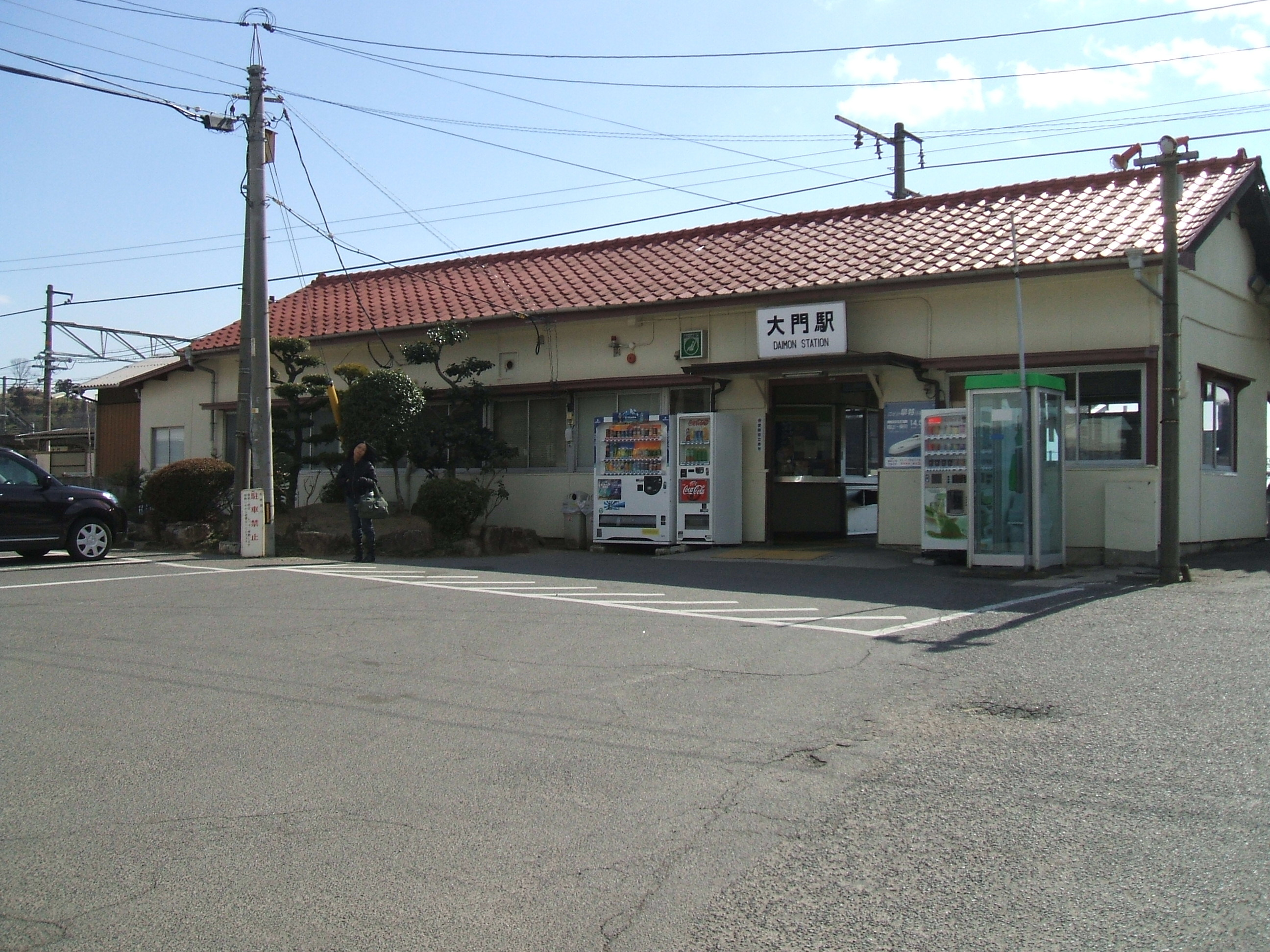
- Daimon Station in 2008

General information
- Location: Nonohama Daimon-cho, Fukuyama-shi, Hiroshima-ken 721-09231; Japan
- Coordinates: 34°29′54.5″N 133°26′23.72″E
- Owner: West Japan Railway Company
- Operator: West Japan Railway Company
- Line: W San'yō Main Line
- Distance: 194.2 km (120.7 miles) from Kobe
- Platforms: 2 side platforms
- Tracks: 2
- Connections: Bus stop

Construction
- Structure type: Ground level
- Accessible: Yes

Other information
- Status: Unstaffed
- Station code: JR-W12
- Website: Official website

History
- Opened: 26 December 1897

Passengers
- FY2019: 2390 daily

Services
Preceding station	JR West	Following station
Higashi-Fukuyama towards Fukuyama	San'yō Line Local	Kasaoka towards Okayama
Location
- Location within Hiroshima Prefecture Location within Japan

Daimon Station (大門駅, Daimon-eki) is a passenger railway station located in the city of Fukuyama, Hiroshima Prefecture, Japan. It is operated by the West Japan Railway Company (JR West).

== Lines ==
Daimon Station is served by the JR West San'yō Main Line, and is located 194.2 kilometers from the terminus of the line at Kobe.

== Station layout ==
The station consists of a side platform and an island platform; however, Platform 2 has been removed and it is effectively two parallel side platforms serving two tracks. The platform is in the middle of a curve. The station building is located on the side of the inbound platform for Okayama, and is connected to the island platform for Fukuyama via an underpass. The station is unattended.

=== Platforms ===
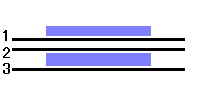
→:for Kasaoka ←:for Higashi-Fukuyama

1	■ W San'yō Main Line	for Shin-Kurashiki and Okayama
2	■ W San'yō Main Line	for Fukuyama and Onomichi

== History ==
Daimon Station was opened on 26 December 1897. With the privatization of the Japanese National Railways (JNR) on 1 April 1987, the station came under the control of JR West.

== Passenger statistics ==
In fiscal 2019, the station was used by an average of 2390 passengers daily.

== Surrounding area ==
- Ginga Gakuin Junior and Senior High School
- Fukuyama City Otsuno Elementary School
- Fukuyama Municipal Daimon Junior High School

== See also ==
- List of railway stations in Japan
