= Kasaoka Station =

Railway station in Kasaoka, Okayama Prefecture, Japan

Kasaoka Station 笠岡駅
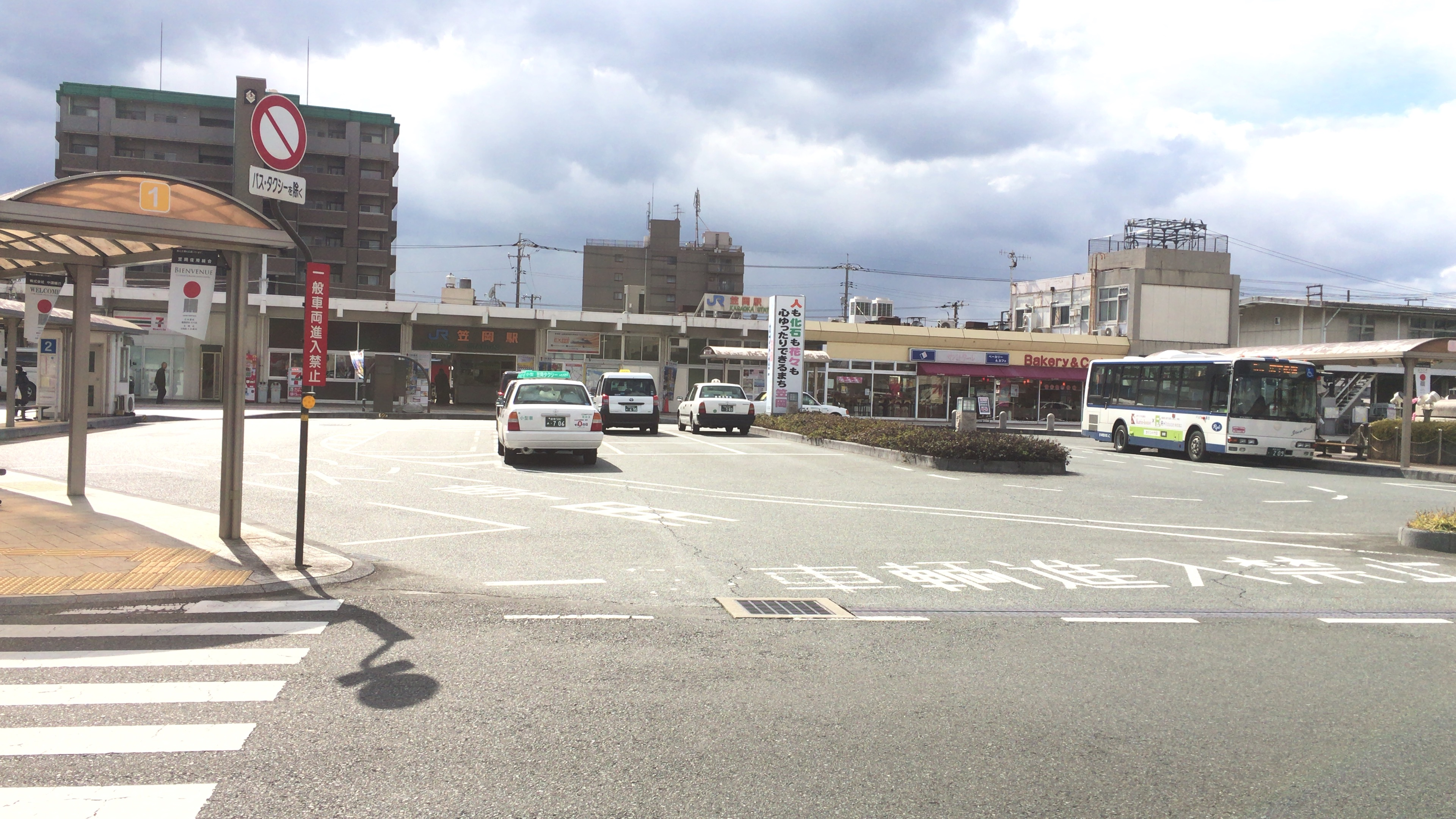
- Kasaoka Station in February 2019

General information
- Location: 2493 Kasaoka, Kasaoka-shi, Okayama-ken 714-0081; Japan
- Coordinates: 34°30′18.00″N 133°30′17.40″E
- Owner: West Japan Railway Company
- Operator: West Japan Railway Company
- Line: W San'yō Main Line
- Distance: 187.1 km (116.3 miles) from Kobe
- Platforms: 1 side + 1 island platform
- Tracks: 3
- Connections: Bus stop

Construction
- Structure type: Ground level
- Accessible: Yes

Other information
- Status: Staffed
- Station code: JR-W11
- Website: Official website

History
- Opened: 14 July 1891

Passengers
- FY2019: 3376 daily
Location
- Location within Okayama Prefecture Location within Japan

Kasaoka Station (笠岡駅, Kasaoka-eki) is a passenger railway station located in the city of Kasaoka, Okayama, Japan. It is operated by the West Japan Railway Company (JR West).

== Lines ==
Kasaoka Station is served by the JR West San'yō Main Line, and is located 187.1 kilometers from the terminus of the line at Kobe.

== Station layout ==
The station consists of a side platform and an island platform. The station building is next to the side platform and is connected to the island platform by a footbridge. The station is staffed.

=== Platforms ===
1	■ W San'yō Main Line	for Shin-Kurashiki and Okayama
2, 3	■ W San'yō Main Line	for Fukuyama and Onomichi

== Adjacent stations ==
«	Service	»
Sanyō Main Line
Satoshō	Rapid Sun Liner	Fukuyama
Satoshō	Local	Daimon

== History ==
Kasaoka Station was opened on 14 July 1891. With the privatization of the Japanese National Railways (JNR) on 1 April 1987, the station came under the control of JR West.

== Passenger statistics ==
In fiscal 2019, the station was used by an average of 3376 passengers daily.

== Surrounding area ==
- Kasaoka City Hall

== See also ==
- List of railway stations in Japan
