= Higashi-Fukuyama Station =

Railway station in Fukuyama, Hiroshima Prefecture, Japan

Higashi-Fukuyama Station 東福山駅
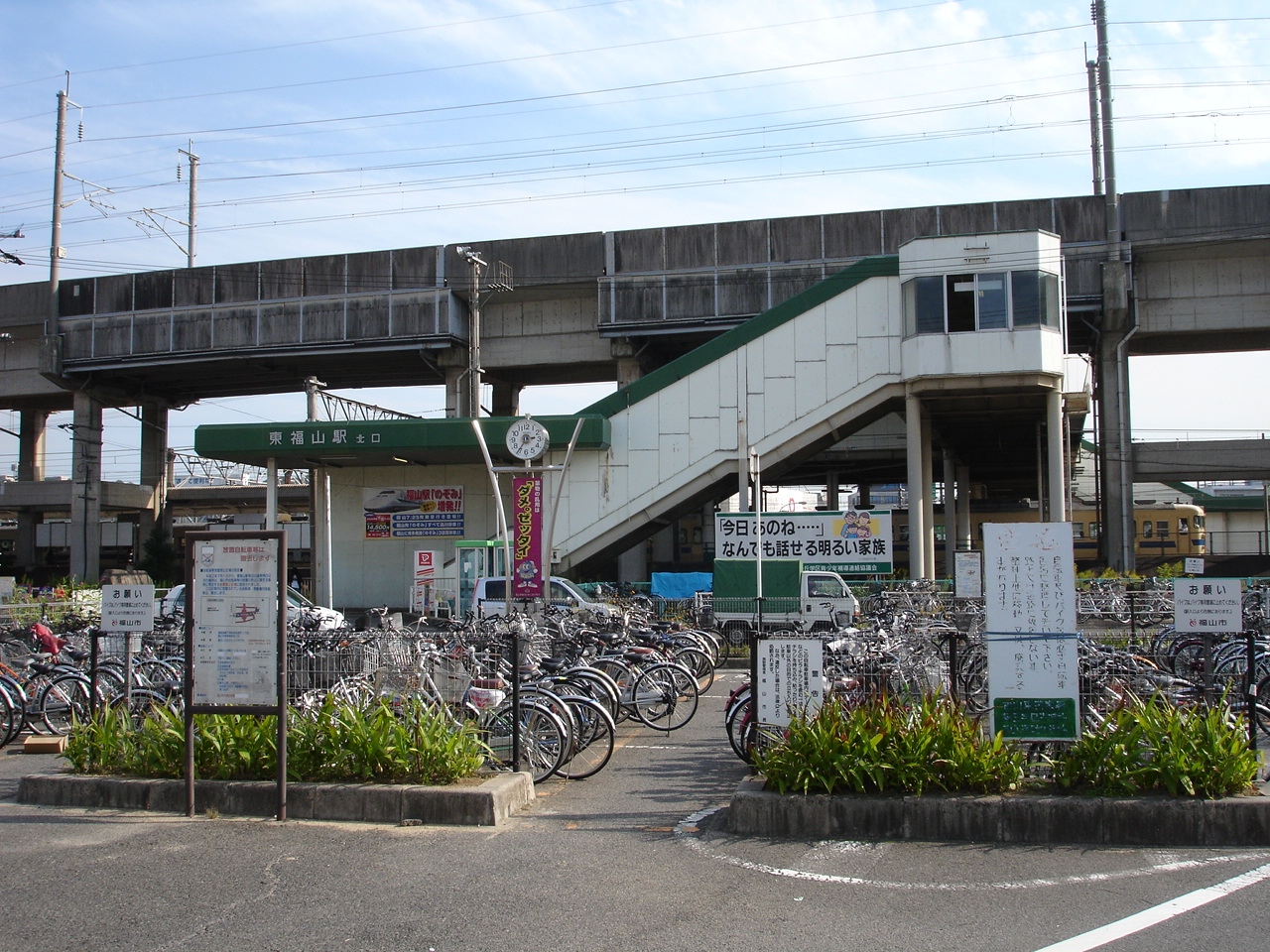
- Higashi-Fukuyama Station east exit, October 2005

General information
- Location: 5-50-10 Hikino-cho, Fukuyama-shi, Hiroshima-ken 721-0942; Japan
- Coordinates: 34°29′42.68″N 133°24′19.43″E
- Owner: West Japan Railway Company
- Operator: West Japan Railway Company
- Line: W San'yō Main Line
- Distance: 197.5 km (122.7 miles) from Kobe
- Platforms: 2 side platforms
- Tracks: 2
- Connections: Bus stop

Construction
- Accessible: Yes

Other information
- Status: Unstaffed
- Station code: JR-W13
- Website: Official website

History
- Opened: 15 June 1966

Passengers
- FY2019: 4411 daily

Services
| Preceding station | JR West | Following station |
|---|---|---|
| Fukuyama Terminus | San'yō Line Local | Daimon towards Okayama |
Location
- Location within Hiroshima Prefecture Location within Japan

Higashi-Fukuyama Station (東福山駅, Higashi-Fukuyama-eki) is a passenger railway station located in the city of Fukuyama, Hiroshima Prefecture, Japan. It is operated by the West Japan Railway Company (JR West). It is also the location of a freight depot operated by the Japan Freight Railway Company {JR Freight).

== Lines ==
Higashi-Fukuyama Station is served by the JR West San'yō Main Line, and is located 197.5 kilometers from the terminus of the line at Kobe.

== Station layout ==
The station consists of two opposed ground-level side platforms connected by an elevated station building. The station is unattended. The freight depot of JR Freight is located on the east side of the south exit of the passenger station. It has 3 container platforms, 4 cargo handling lines, and several other arrival/departure lines, storage lines, turning lines, etc.

=== Platforms ===
| 1 | ■ W San'yō Main Line | for Shin-Kurashiki and Okayama |
| 2 | ■ W San'yō Main Line | for Fukuyama and Onomichi |

== History ==
Higashi-Fukuyama Station was opened as a freight depot on 15 June 1966. Facilities for passenger operations were added on 1 April 1979. With the privatization of the Japanese National Railways (JNR) on 1 April 1987, the station came under the control of JR West.

== Passenger statistics ==
In fiscal 2019, the station was used by an average of 4411 passengers daily.

== Surrounding area ==
- Fukuyama Municipal Hikino Elementary School
- Fukuyama Municipal Hitotsubashi Junior High School
- Asahi Medical College Fukuyama Campus

== See also ==
- List of railway stations in Japan
