= Satoshō Station =

Railway station in Satoshō, Okayama Prefecture, Japan

Satoshō Station 里庄駅
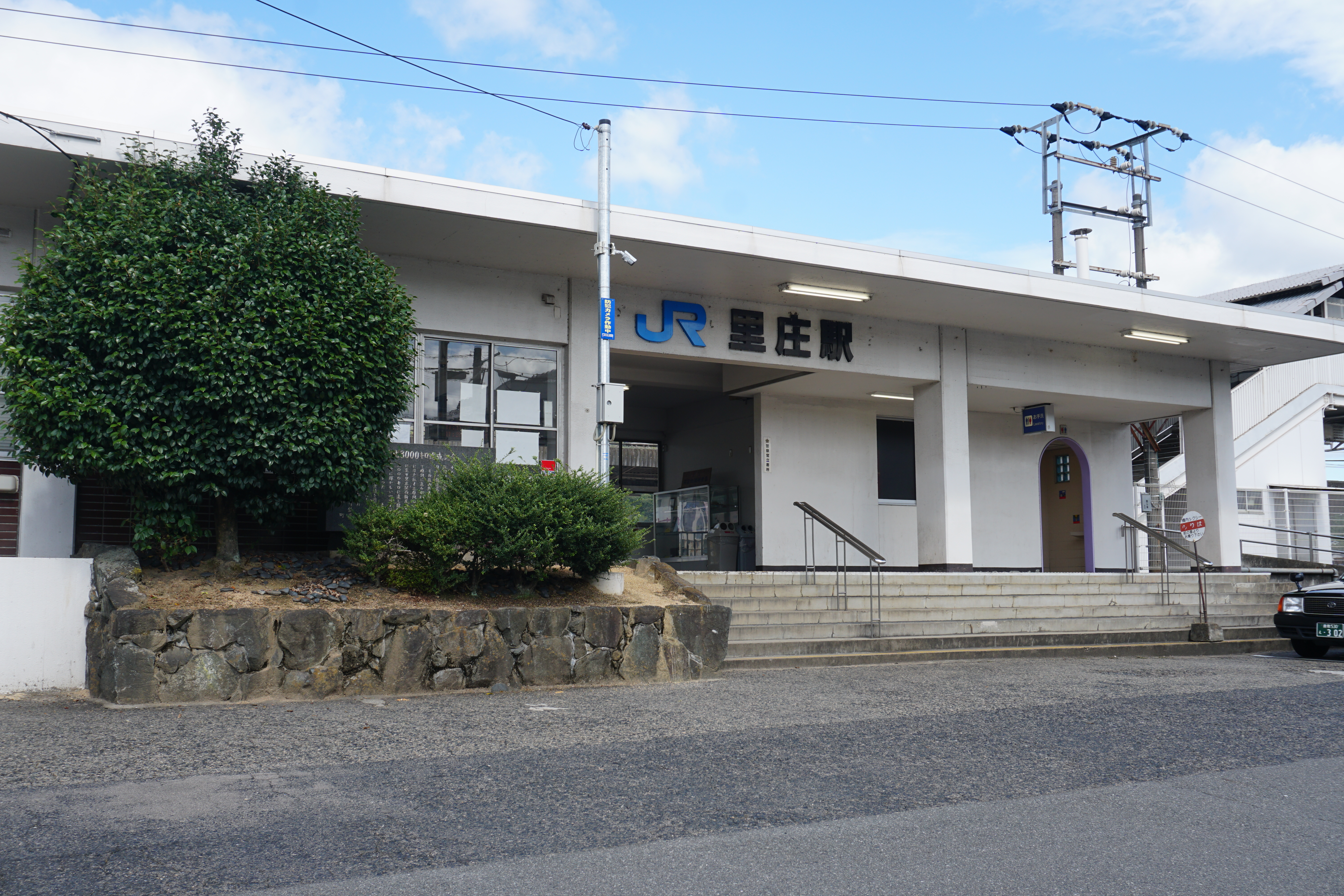
- Satoshō Station in September 2020

General information
- Location: Shinjō 2784-5, Satoshō-chō, Asakuchi-gun, Okayama-ken 719-0302; Japan
- Coordinates: 34°30′28.25″N 133°33′3.37″E
- Owner: West Japan Railway Company
- Operator: West Japan Railway Company
- Line: W San'yō Main Line
- Distance: 182.4 km (113.3 miles) from Kobe
- Platforms: 1 side + 1 island platform
- Tracks: 3
- Connections: Bus stop

Construction
- Structure type: Ground level

Other information
- Status: Unstaffed
- Station code: JR-W10
- Website: Official website

History
- Opened: 15 November 1920

Passengers
- FY2019: 1307 daily
Location
- Location within Okayama Prefecture Location within Japan

Satoshō Station (里庄駅, Satoshō-eki) is a passenger railway station located in the town of Satoshō, Asakuchi District, Okayama Prefecture, Japan. It is operated by the West Japan Railway Company (JR West).

== Lines ==
Satoshō Station is served by the JR West San'yō Main Line, and is located 182.4 kilometers from the terminus of the line at Kobe.

== Station layout ==
The station consists of a side platform and an island platform. The station building is next to the side platform and connected to the island platform by a footbridge. The station is unattended.

=== Platforms ===
1	■ W San'yō Main Line	for Fukuyama and Onomichi
2, 3	■ W San'yō Main Line	for Shin-Kurashiki and Okayama

== Adjacent stations ==
«	Service	»
Sanyō Main Line
Kamogata	Rapid Sun Liner	Kasaoka
Kamogata	Local	Kasaoka

== History ==
Satoshō Station was opened on 15 November 1920 With the privatization of Japanese National Railways (JNR) on 1 April 1987, the station came under the control of JR West.

== Passenger statistics ==
In fiscal 2019, the station was used by an average of 1307 passengers daily.

== Surrounding area ==
- Satoshō Town Museum of History and Folklore
- Satoshō Town Hall

== See also ==
- List of railway stations in Japan
