= Matsunaga Station =

Railway station in Fukuyama, Hiroshima Prefecture, Japan

Matsunaga Station 松永駅
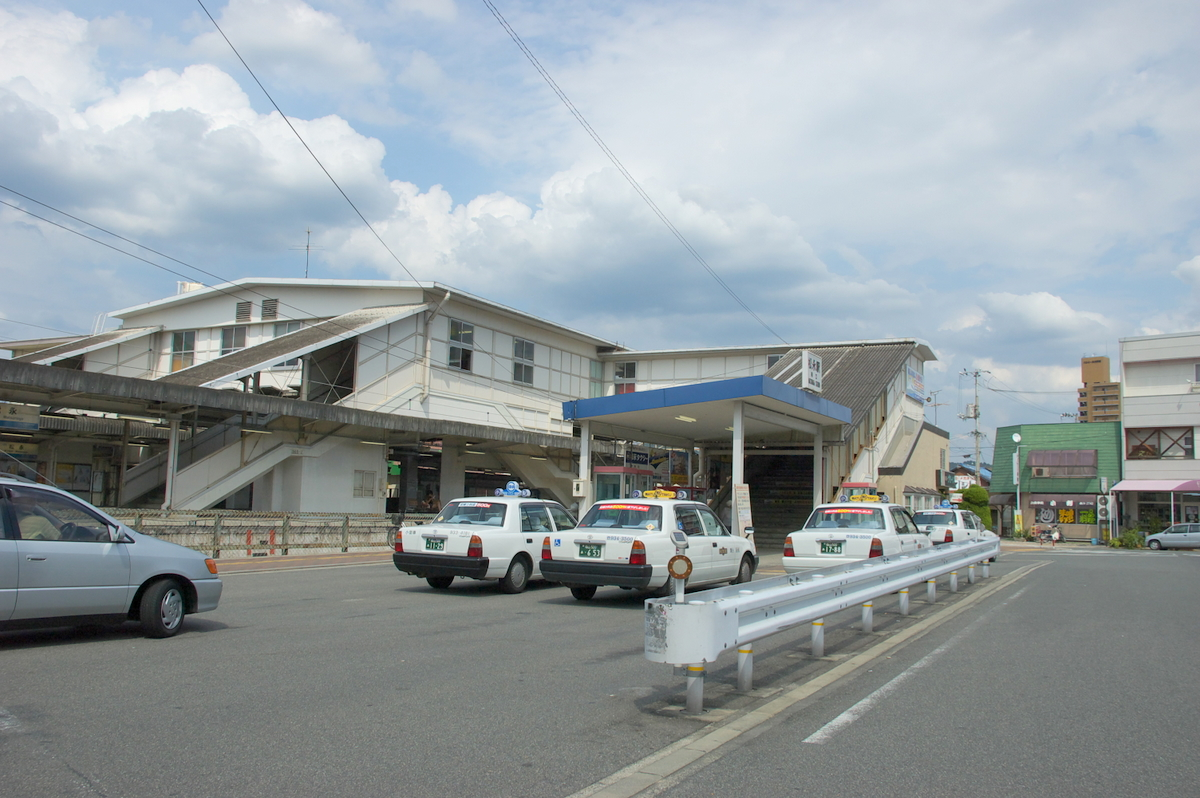
- Matsunaga Station in September 2007

General information
- Location: 342-10 Matsunaga-cho, Fukuyama-shi, Hiroshima-ken 729-0104; Japan
- Coordinates: 34°27′3.17″N 133°15′30.81″E
- Owner: West Japan Railway Company
- Operator: West Japan Railway Company
- Line: X San'yō Main Line
- Distance: 212.4 km (132.0 miles) from Kobe
- Platforms: 1 side + 1 island platform
- Tracks: 3
- Connections: Bus stop

Construction
- Structure type: Ground level
- Accessible: Yes

Other information
- Status: Unstaffed
- Station code: JR-X16
- Website: Official website

History
- Opened: 3 November 1891

Passengers
- FY2019: 4801 daily

Services
Preceding station	JR West	Following station
Higashi-Onomichi towards Mihara	San'yō Line Local	Bingo-Akasaka towards Fukuyama
Location
- Location within Hiroshima Prefecture Location within Japan

Matsunaga Station (松永駅, Matsunaga-eki) is a passenger railway station located in the city of Fukuyama, Hiroshima Prefecture, Japan. It is operated by the West Japan Railway Company (JR West).

== Lines ==
Matsunaga Station is served by the JR West San'yō Main Line, and is located 212.4 kilometers from the terminus of the line at Kobe.

== Station layout ==
The station consists of a side platform and an island platform connected to the concrete station building by a footbridge. It has a siding facility in the cutout on the east side of the single platform. The station is unattended.

=== Platforms ===
1	■ X San'yō Main Line	for Fukuyama and Okayama
2	■ X San'yō Main Line	spare
3	■ X San'yō Main Line	for Onomichi and Mihara

== History ==
Matsunaga Station was opened on 3 November 1891. With the privatization of the Japanese National Railways (JNR) on 1 April 1987, the station came under the control of JR West.

== Passenger statistics ==
In fiscal 2019, the station was used by an average of 4801 passengers daily.

== Surrounding area ==
- Fukuyama University
- Hiroshima Prefectural Matsunaga High School

== See also ==
- List of railway stations in Japan
