= Kamogata Station =

Railway station in Asakuchi, Okayama Prefecture, Japan

Kamogata Station 鴨方駅
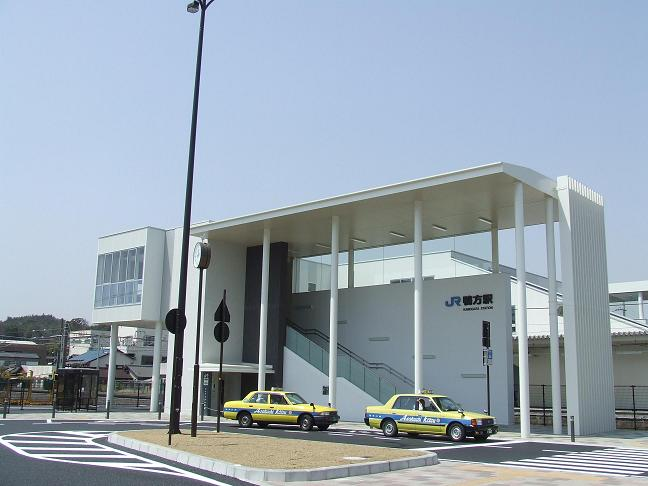
- Kamogata Station in April 2011

General information
- Location: Kamogatacho Rokujoinnaka, Asakuchi-shi, Okayama-ken 719-0252; Japan
- Coordinates: 34°31′38.8″N 133°35′15.80″E
- Owner: West Japan Railway Company
- Operator: West Japan Railway Company
- Line: W San'yō Main Line
- Distance: 178.4 km (110.9 miles) from Kobe
- Platforms: 1 island platform
- Tracks: 2
- Connections: Bus stop

Construction
- Accessible: Yes

Other information
- Status: Unstaffed
- Station code: JR-W09
- Website: Official website

History
- Opened: 14 July 1891

Passengers
- FY2019: 2984 daily
Location
- Location within Okayama Prefecture Location within Japan

Kamogata Station (鴨方駅, Kamogata-eki) is a passenger railway station located in the city of Asakuchi, Okayama, Japan. It is operated by the West Japan Railway Company (JR West).

== Lines ==
Kamogata Station is served by the JR West San'yō Main Line, and is located 178.4 kilometers from the terminus of the line at Kobe.

== Station layout ==
The station consists of a ground-level island platform with an elevated station building. The station is unattended.

=== Platforms ===
1	■ W San'yō Main Line	for Shin-Kurashiki and Okayama
2	■ W San'yō Main Line	for Fukuyama and Onomichi

== Adjacent stations ==
«	Service	»
Sanyō Main Line
Konkō	Rapid Sun Liner	Satoshō
Konkō	Local	Satoshō

== History ==
Kamogata Station was opened on 14 July 1891. With the privatization of the Japanese National Railways (JNR) on 1 April 1987, the station came under the control of JR West. The current station building was completed in March 2011.

== Passenger statistics ==
In fiscal 2019, the station was used by an average of 2984 passengers daily.

== Surrounding area ==
- Asakuchi City Hall
- Asakuchi Municipal Rokujoin Elementary School
- Okayama Sanyo High School

== See also ==
- List of railway stations in Japan
