= Konkō Station =

Railway station in Asakuchi, Okayama Prefecture, Japan

Konkō Station 金光駅
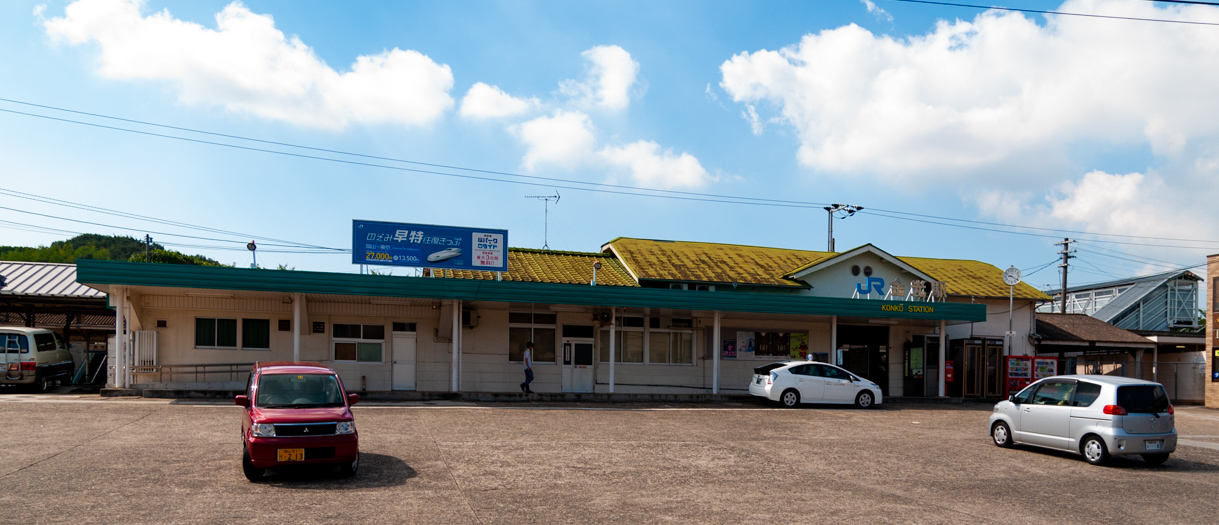
- Konkō Station in August 2011

General information
- Location: Konkocho Urami Shinden, Asakuchi-shi, Okayama-ken 719-0104; Japan
- Coordinates: 34°32′28.5″N 133°37′14.45″E
- Owner: West Japan Railway Company
- Operator: West Japan Railway Company
- Line: W San'yō Main Line
- Distance: 174.9 km (108.7 miles) from Kobe
- Platforms: 1 side + 1 island platform
- Tracks: 3
- Connections: Bus stop

Construction
- Accessible: Yes

Other information
- Status: Unstaffed
- Station code: JR-W08
- Website: Official website

History
- Opened: 4 August 1901
- Former names: Konjin Station (to 1919)

Passengers
- FY2019: 2240 daily
Location
- Location within Okayama Prefecture Location within Japan

Konkō Station (金光駅, Konkō-eki) is a passenger railway station located in the city of Asakuchi, Okayama, Japan. It is operated by the West Japan Railway Company (JR West).

== Lines ==
Konkō Station is served by the JR West San'yō Main Line, and is located 174.9 kilometers from the terminus of the line at Kobe.

== Station layout ==
The station consists of a ground-level side platform and island platform, connected by a footbridge. The station is unattended.

=== Platforms ===
| 1, 2 | ■ W San'yō Main Line | for Shin-Kurashiki and Okayama |
| 3 | ■ W San'yō Main Line | for Fukuyama and Onomichi |

== Adjacent stations ==
| « | Service | » |
Sanyō Main Line
| Shin-Kurashiki | Rapid Sun Liner | Kamogata |
| Shin-Kurashiki | Local | Kamogata |

== History ==
Konkō Station was opened on 4 August 1901 as Konjin Station (金神駅). The current station building was completed in March 1902. With the privatization of the Japanese National Railways (JNR) on 1 April 1987, the station came under the control of JR West.

== Passenger statistics ==
In fiscal 2019, the station was used by an average of 2240 passengers daily.

== Surrounding area ==
- Konkōkyō headquarters
- Asakuchi City Hall Konkō General Branch (former Konko Town Office)
- Konkō Gakuen Junior and Senior High School

== See also ==
- List of railway stations in Japan
