= Kamogata =

Kamogata may refer to:

- Kamogata, Okayama, a former town in Asakuchi District, Okayama Prefecture, Japan
- Kamogata Station, a railway station in Asakuchi, Okayama Prefecture, Japan
- 9293 Kamogata, a main-belt asteroid
