= Bingo-Akasaka Station =

Railway station in Fukuyama, Hiroshima Prefecture, Japan

Bingo-Akasaka Station 備後赤坂駅
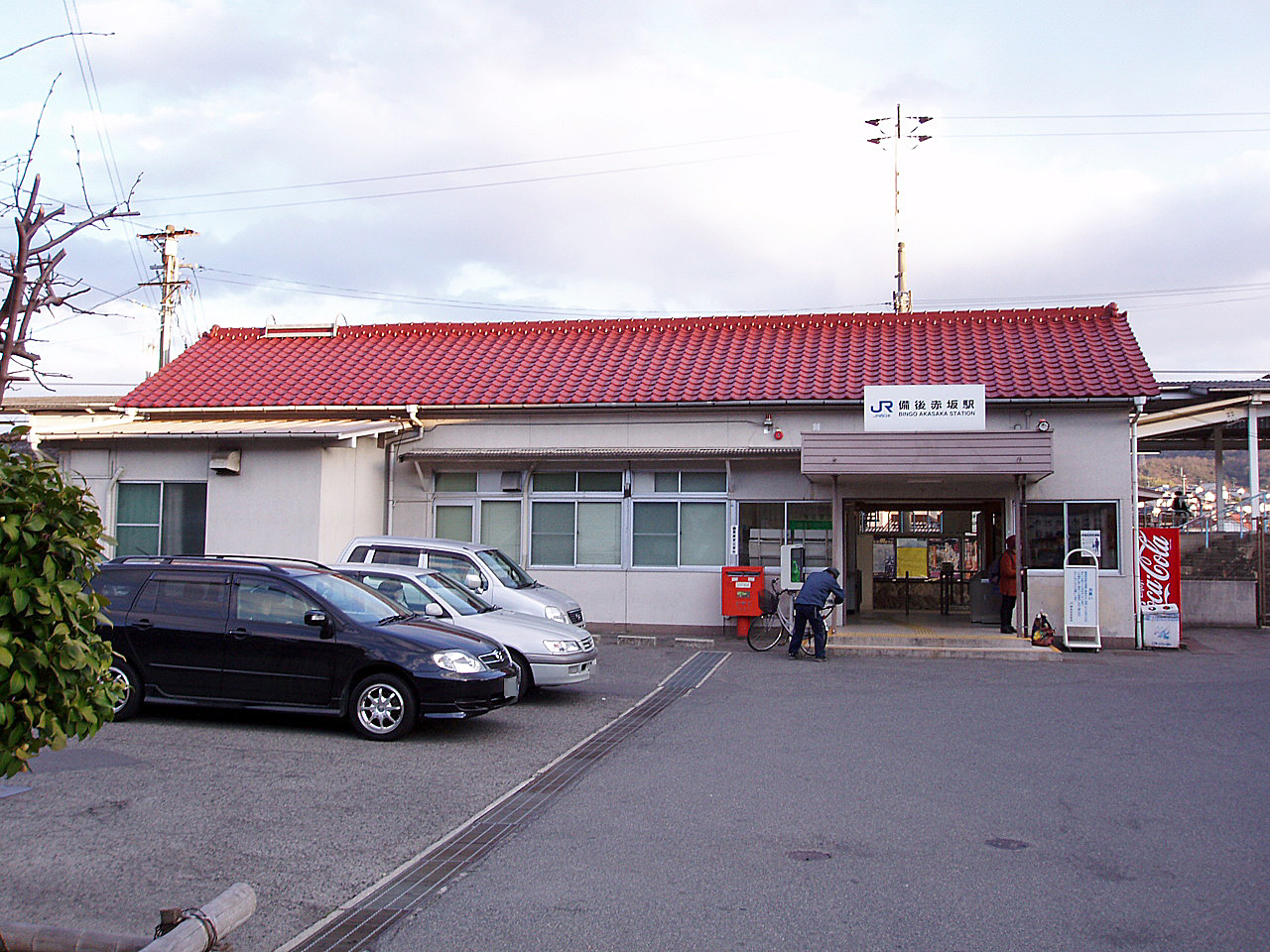
- The station building in March 2007

General information
- Location: 1226 Akasaka, Akasaka-cho, Fukuyama-shi, Hiroshima-ken 720-0843; Japan
- Coordinates: 34°28′19.64″N 133°18′19.55″E
- Owner: West Japan Railway Company
- Operator: West Japan Railway Company
- Line: X San'yō Main Line
- Distance: 207.5 km (128.9 miles) from Kobe
- Platforms: 1 side + 1 island platform
- Tracks: 3
- Connections: Bus stop

Construction
- Structure type: Ground level
- Accessible: Yes

Other information
- Status: Unstaffed
- Station code: JR-W15
- Website: Official website

History
- Opened: 5 June 1916
- Former names: Minokoshi (to 1918)

Passengers
- FY2019: 1845 daily
Location
- Location within Hiroshima Prefecture Location within Japan

Bingo-Akasaka Station (備後赤坂駅, Bingo-Akasaka-eki) is a passenger railway station located in the city of Fukuyama, Hiroshima Prefecture, Japan. It is operated by the West Japan Railway Company (JR West).

== Lines ==
Bingo-Akasaka Station is served by the JR West San'yō Main Line, and is located 207.5 kilometers from the terminus of the line at Kobe.

== Station layout ==
The station consists of a side platform and an island platform connected by a footbridge. The station is unattended.

=== Platforms ===
| 1 | ■ X San'yō Main Line | for Fukuyama and Okayama |
| 2 | ■ X San'yō Main Line | spare |
| 3 | ■ X San'yō Main Line | for Onomichi and Mihara |

== Adjacent stations ==
| « | Service | » |
Sanyo Main Line
| Fukuyama | Local | Matsunaga |

== History ==
Bingo-Akasaka Station was opened on 5 June 1916 as Minokoshi Station (水越駅). It was renamed 1 January 1918. With the privatization of the Japanese National Railways (JNR) on 1 April 1987, the station came under the control of JR West.

== Passenger statistics ==
In fiscal 2019, the station was used by an average of 1845 passengers daily.

== Surrounding area ==
- Kanbaru Hospital
- Fukuyama Municipal Jimi Junior High School
- Fukuyama Municipal Fukuyama Junior and Senior High School

== See also ==
- List of railway stations in Japan
