= Higashi-Onomichi Station =

Railway station in Onomichi, Hiroshima Prefecture, Japan

Higashi-Onomichi Station 東尾道駅
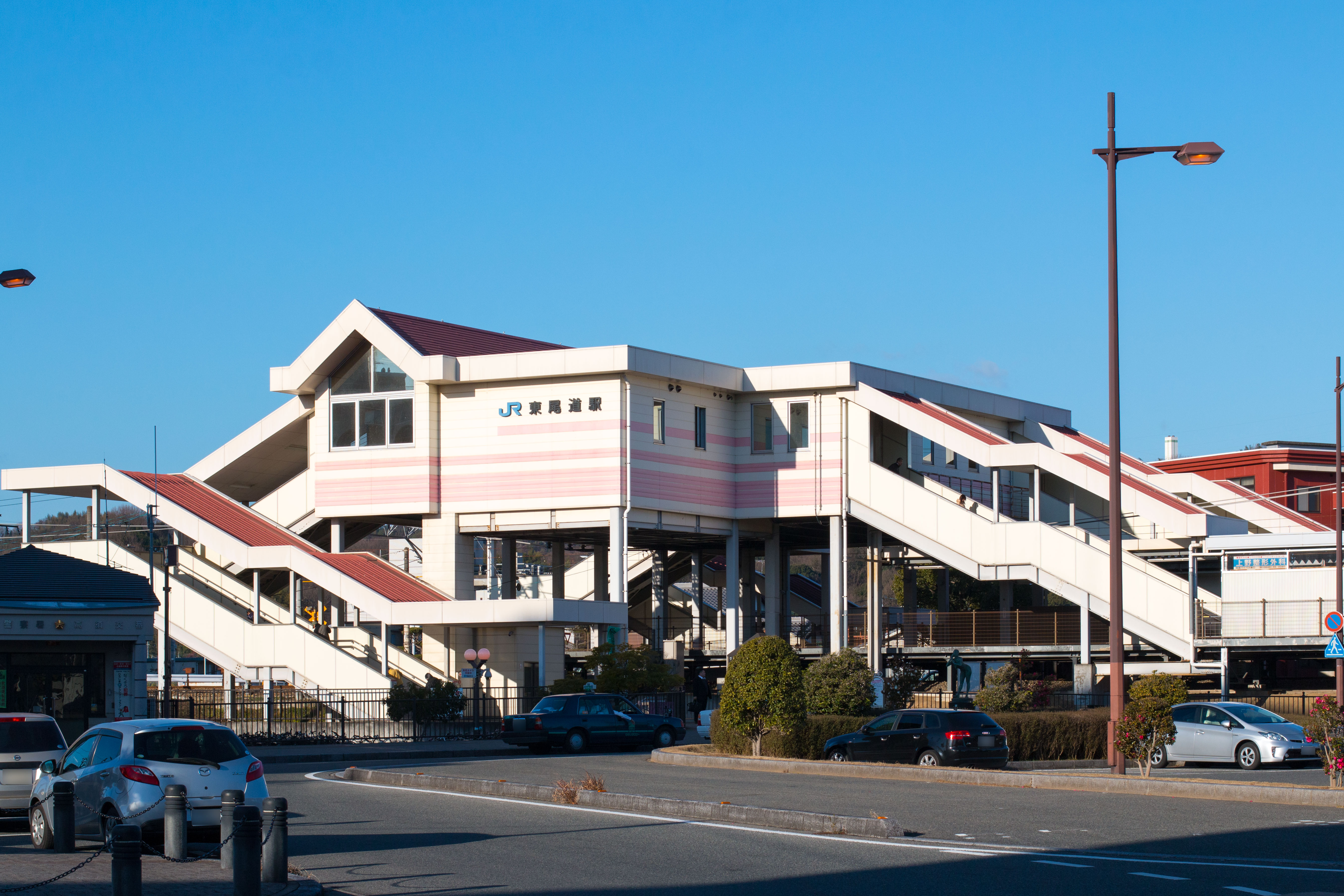
- Higashi-Onomichi Station in January 2017

General information
- Location: 4735-2 Takasucho, Onomichi-shi, Hiroshima-ken 729-0141; Japan
- Coordinates: 34°26′6″N 133°14′0″E
- Owner: West Japan Railway Company
- Operator: West Japan Railway Company
- Line: X San'yō Main Line
- Distance: 212.4 km (132.0 miles) from Kobe
- Platforms: 2 side platforms
- Tracks: 2
- Connections: Bus stop

Construction
- Accessible: Yes

Other information
- Status: Unstaffed
- Station code: JR-X17
- Website: Official website

History
- Opened: 21 July 1996

Passengers
- FY2019: 2081 daily

Services
Preceding station	JR West	Following station
Onomichi towards Mihara	San'yō Line Local	Matsunaga towards Fukuyama
Location
- Location within Hiroshima Prefecture Location within Japan

Higashi-Onomichi Station (東尾道駅, Higashi-Onomichi-eki) is a passenger railway station located in the city of Onomichi, Hiroshima Prefecture, Japan. It is operated by the West Japan Railway Company (JR West).

== Lines ==
Higashi-Onomichi Station is served by the JR West San'yō Main Line, and is located 215.3 kilometers from the terminus of the line at Kobe.

== Station layout ==
The station consists of two ground-level side platforms connected by an elevated station building. The station is unattended.

=== Platforms ===
1	■ X San'yō Main Line	for Onomichi and Mihara
2	■ X San'yō Main Line	for Fukuyama and Okayama

== History ==
Higashi-Onomichi Station was opened on 21 July 1996.

== Passenger statistics ==
In fiscal 2019, the station was used by an average of 2081 passengers daily.

== Surrounding area ==
- Japan National Route 2

== See also ==
- List of railway stations in Japan
