= Niwase Station =

Railway station in Okayama, Japan

Niwase Station 庭瀬駅
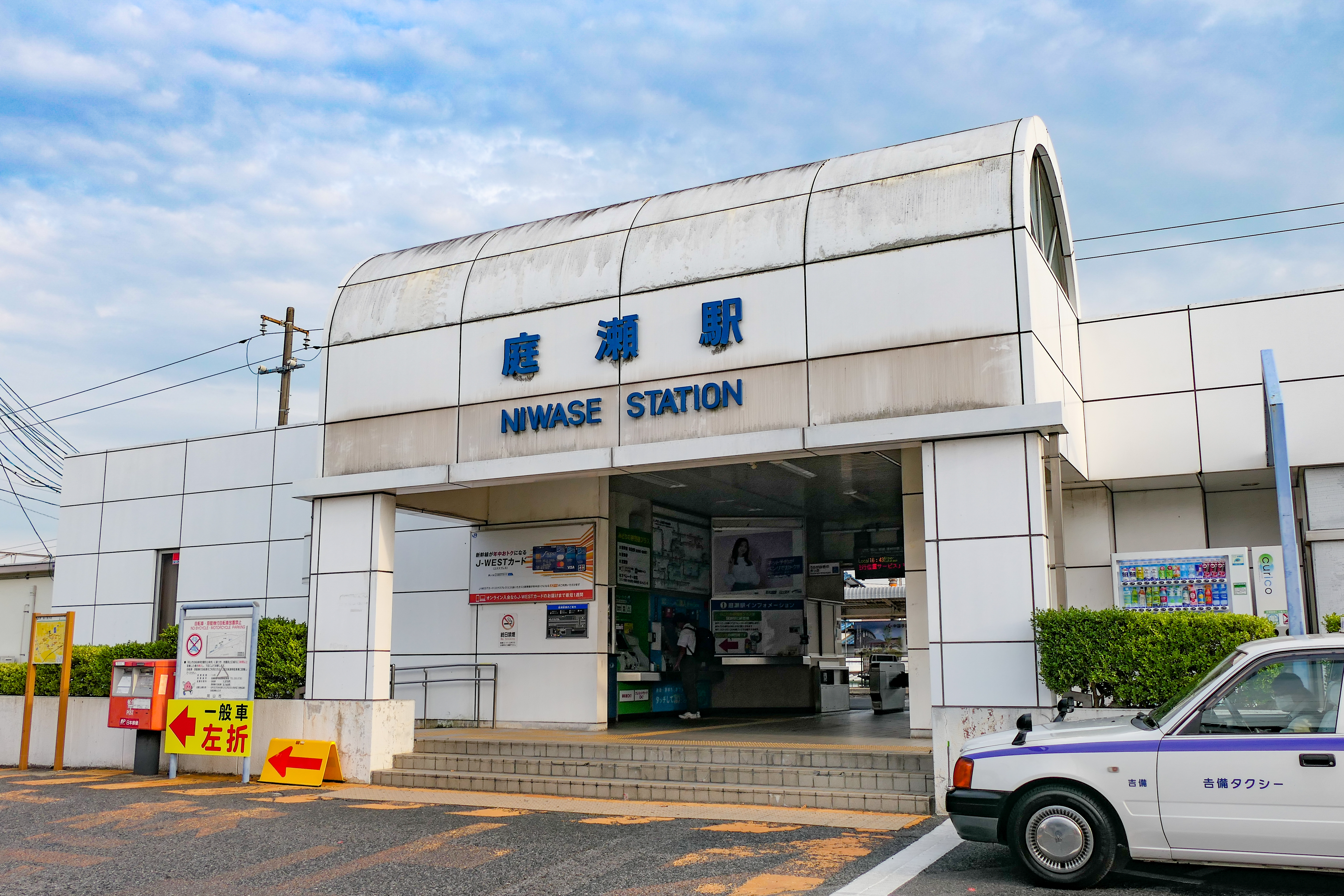
- Niwase Station in October 2022

General information
- Location: 319-1 Hirano-chō, Kita-ku, Okayama-shi, Okayama-ken 701-0151; Japan
- Coordinates: 34°38′34.23″N 133°51′13.92″E
- Owner: West Japan Railway Company
- Operator: West Japan Railway Company
- Lines: W San'yō Main Line; (V Hakubi Line)
- Distance: 149.9 km (93.1 miles) from Kōbe
- Platforms: 2 side platforms
- Connections: Bus stop

Other information
- Status: Unstaffed
- Station code: JR-W03（San'yō Main Line）; JR-V03（Hakubi Line）
- Website: Official website

History
- Opened: 25 April 1891; 135 years ago

Passengers
- FY2019: 4341 daily

Services
Preceding station	JR West	Following station
Nakashō towards Fukuyama	San'yō Line Local	Kitanagase towards Okayama
Location
- Location within Okayama Prefecture Location within Japan

Niwase Station (庭瀬駅, Niwase-eki) is a passenger railway station located in Kita-ku of the city of Okayama, Okayama Prefecture, Japan. It is operated by West Japan Railway Company (JR West).

== Lines ==
Niwase Station is served by the San'yō Main Line, and is located 149.9 kilometers from the terminus of the line at Kōbe and 6.5 kilometers from Okayama. It is also served by trains of the Hakubi Line, which continue past the nominal terminus of that line at Kurashiki to terminate at Okayama.

== Station layout ==
The station consists of two opposed side platforms on a slight embankment, connected by a footbridge. The station is unattended.

=== Platforms ===
1	■ W San'yō Main Line	for Okayama
1	■ V Hakubi Line	for Okayama
2	■ W San'yō Main Line	for Kurashiki
2	■ V Hakubi Line	for Kurashiki, Niimi, Yonago

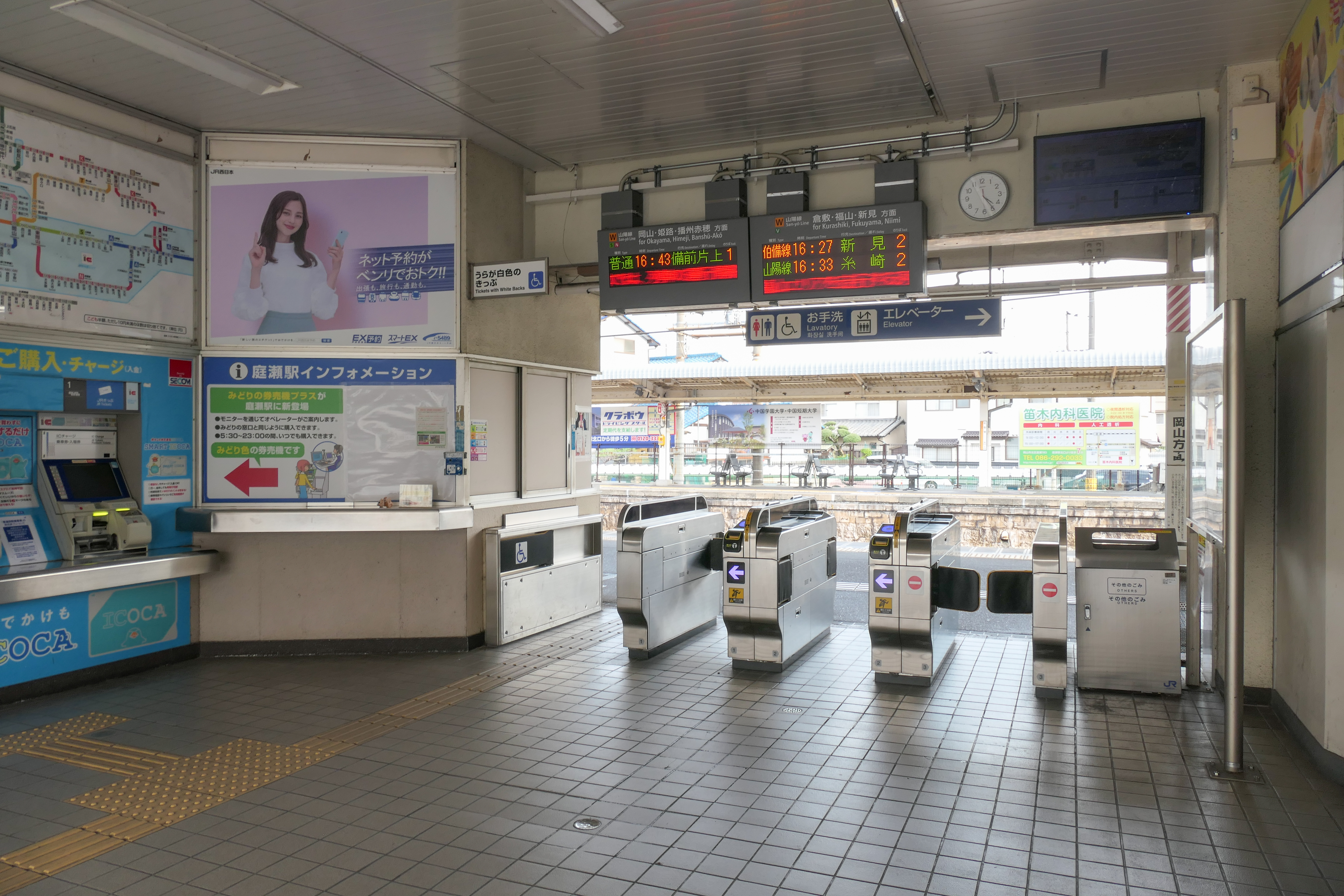
Ticket gates

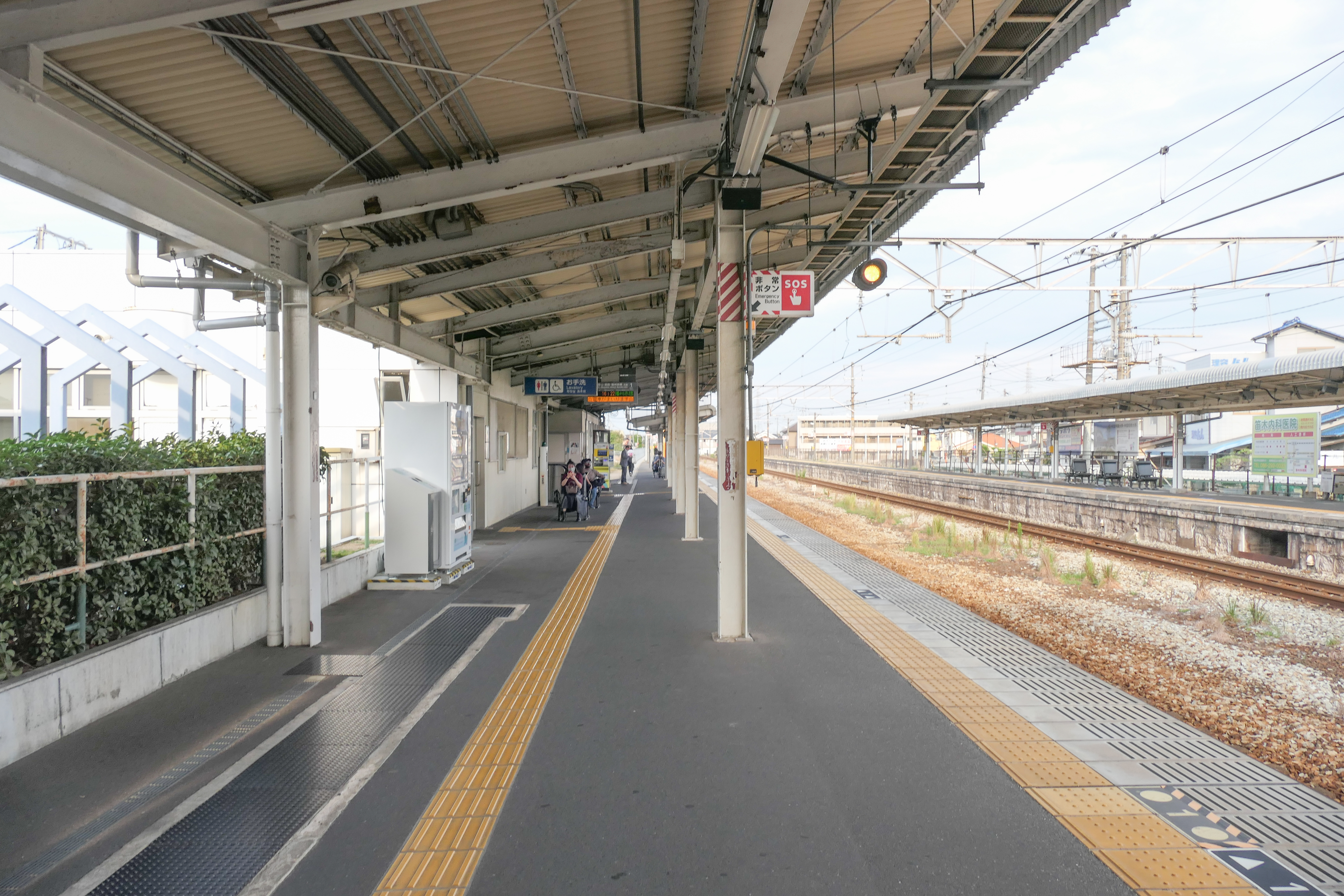
Platform 1

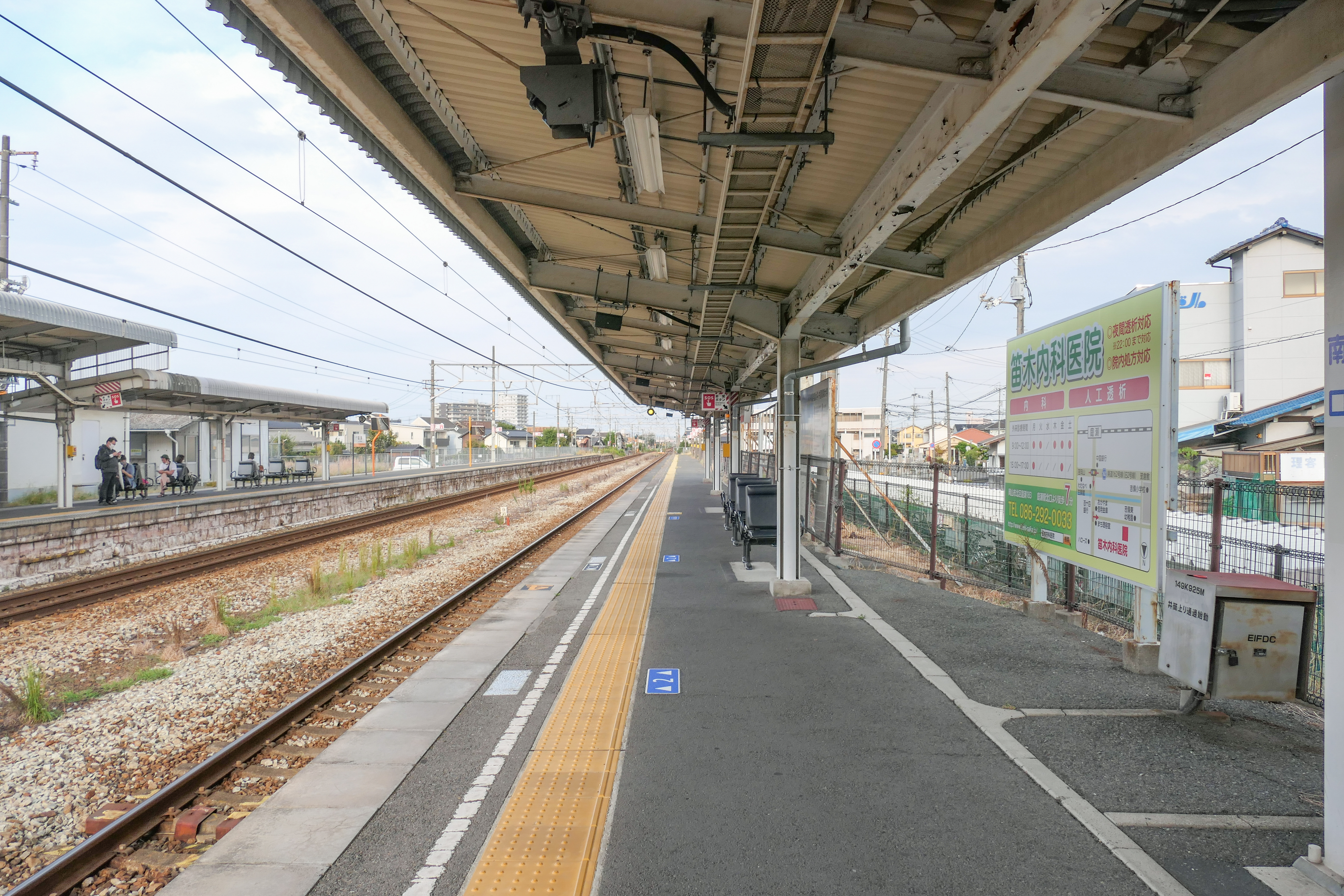
Platform 2

== History ==
Niwase Station opened on April 25, 1891 at the same time as the opening of the section between Okayama Station and Kurashiki Station on the Sanyo Railway. The current station building was opened in 1986 and the building itself won the Railway Architectural Association's Station Architecture Award for 1985. With the privatization of the Japan National Railways (JNR) on April 1, 1987, the station came under the aegis of the West Japan Railway Company.

== Passenger statistics ==
In fiscal 2019, the station was used by an average of 4341 passengers daily.

== See also ==
- List of railway stations in Japan
