= San'yō Main Line =

Major railway line in Japan

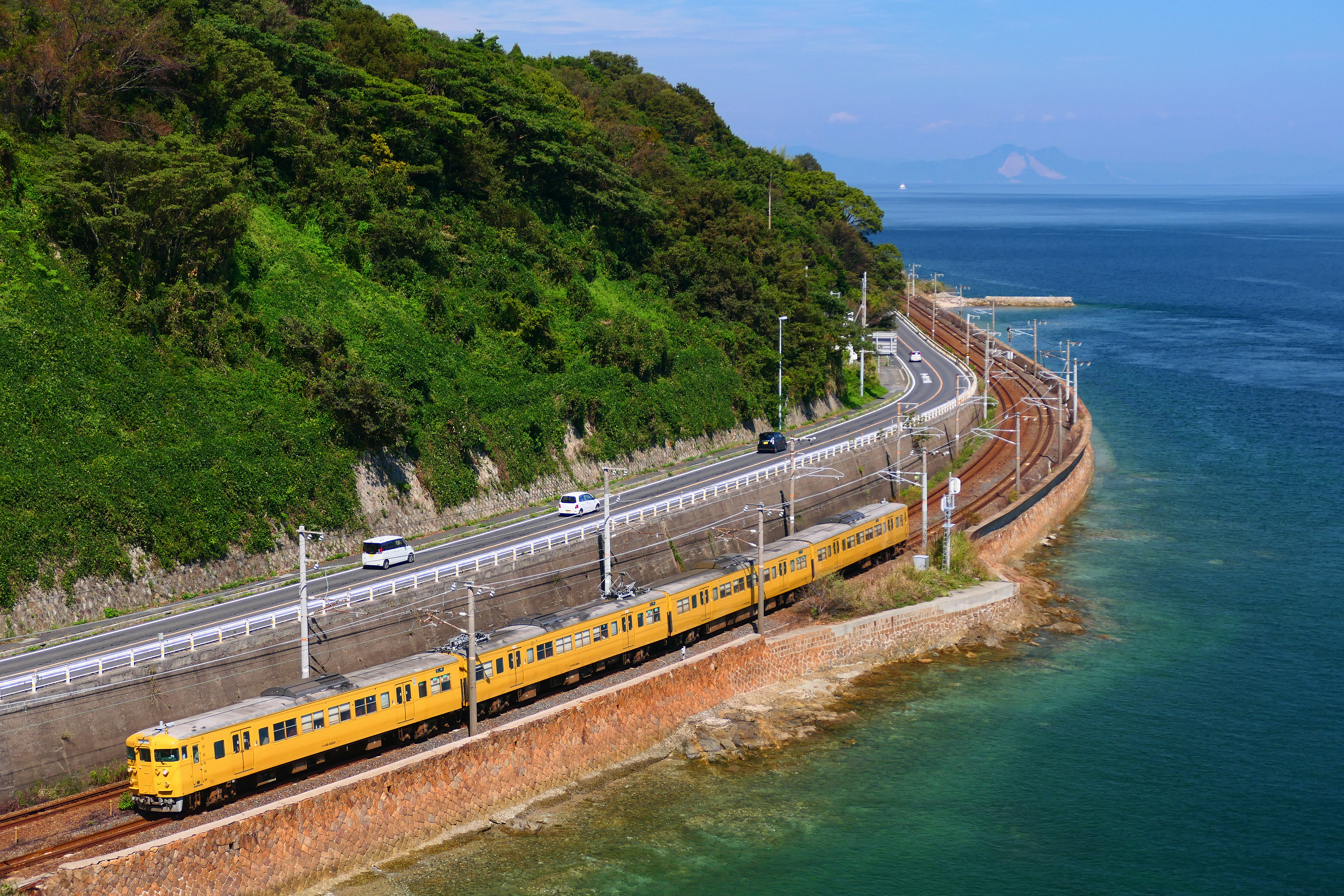
- JNR 115-3000 in Setouchi yellow livery running near the Seto Inland Sea.

Overview
- Other name: JR Kobe Line (Kobe – Himeji)
- Native name: 山陽本線
- Owner: JR West; JR Kyushu
- Locale: Kansai, Chugoku, Kyushu regions
- Termini: Kōbe, Hyōgo; Moji, Wadamisaki
- Stations: 124

Service
- Type: Heavy rail, commuter rail
- System: Urban Network (Kōbe – Kamigōri, Hyōgo – Wadamisaki); Hiroshima City Network (Shiraichi – Minami-Iwakuni)
- Operators: JR West; JR Kyushu; JR Freight

History
- Opened: 1872; 154 years ago

Technical
- Line length: 528.1 km (328.1 mi) (Kōbe – Shimonoseki); 6.3 km (3.9 mi) (Shimonoseki – Moji); 2.7 km (1.7 mi) (Hyōgo – Wadamisaki)
- Track gauge: 1,067 mm (3 ft 6 in)
- Electrification: 1,500 V DC (overhead catenary) (Kōbe – Kanmon Tunnel, Hyōgo – Wadamisaki); 20 kV AC 60 Hz (overhead catenary) (inside Moji station only)
- Operating speed: 130 km/h (81 mph) (Kōbe – Okayama); 120 km/h (75 mph) (Okayama – Shimonoseki); 85 km/h (53 mph) (Shimonoseki – Moji, Hyōgo – Wadamisaki)

The San'yō Main Line (山陽本線, San'yō-honsen) is a major railway line owned by JR Group companies in western Japan, connecting Kōbe Station and Moji Station, largely paralleling the coast of the Seto Inland Sea, in other words, the southern coast of western Honshu. The San'yō Shinkansen line largely parallels its route. The name San'yō derived from the ancient region and highway San'yōdō, the road on the sunny (south) side of the mountains.

The San'yō Main Line is operated by two JR companies:

- West Japan Railway Company (JR West) JR Kobe Line, San'yō Line
- Kyushu Railway Company (JR Kyushu) San'yō Line

The Wadamisaki Line, a short section of line in the length of 2.7 km (1.7 mi) between Hyōgo and Wadamisaki stations in Kobe is a branch of the San'yō Main Line. A short section connecting Kitakyushu Freight Terminal also forms part of the San'yō Main Line.

== Basic data ==
- Operators, distances: 537.1 km (333.7 mi).
  - West Japan Railway Company (Category-1, Services and tracks)
    - From Kobe to Shimonoseki: 528.1 km (328.1 mi).
    - From Hyōgo to Wadamisaki: 2.7 km (1.7 mi).
  - Kyushu Railway Company (Category-1, Services and tracks)
    - From Shimonoseki to Moji: 6.3 km (3.9 mi).
  - Japan Freight Railway Company (Category-2, Services)
    - From Kobe to Kitakyushu Freight Terminal: 534.4 km (332.1 mi).
- Gauge: 1,067 mm (3 ft 6 in)
- Stations:
  - Passenger stations: 124
  - Freight terminals: 5
- Track:
  - Quadruple-track line:
    - From Kobe to Nishi-Akashi: 22.8 km (14.2 mi).
    - From Kaitaichi to Hiroshima: 6.4 km (4.0 mi).
  - Double-track line:
    - From Nishi-Akashi to Kaitaichi: 275.5 km (171.2 mi).
    - From Hiroshima to Moji: 208.0 km (129.2 mi).
  - Single-track line:
    - From Hyōgo to Wadamisaki
- Electrification: Entire line (1,500 V DC. Excluding inside Moji Station and Kitakyūshū Freight Terminal, which is 20,000 V AC, 60 Hz.)
- Railway signalling:
  - From Kobe to Moji: Automatic
  - From Hyōgo to Wadamisaki: Special Automatic (Track Circuit Detection); a simplified automatic system.
- Maximum speed at service:
  - From Kobe to Himeji: 130 km/h (81 mph)
  - From Himeji to Okayama: Tilting trains 130 km/h (81 mph), others 120 km/h (75 mph)
  - From Okayama to Shimonoseki: 120 km/h (75 mph)
  - From Shimonoseki to Moji: 85 km/h (53 mph)
  - From Hyōgo to Wadamisaki: 85 km/h (53 mph)
- CTC centers:
  - From Kobe to Kamigōri: Shin-Ōsaka Operation Control Center
  - From Kamigōri to Itozaki: Okayama Transportation Control Room
  - From Itozaki to Shimonoseki: Hiroshima Operation Control Center
  - From Shimonoseki to Moji: Hakata Operation Control Center
- CTC system:
  - From Kobe to Kamigōri: Safety Urban Network Traffic System (SUNTRAS)

== Stations ==
=== From Kobe to Himeji (JR Kobe Line) ===
●: Trains stop at all times
｜: Trains pass at all times
▲: Eastbound trains pass in the morning
○: Weekday mornings only

Line	No.	Station	Distance in km (mi)		Local	Rapid	Special Rapid	Transfers	Location	
Line	No.	Station	Between stations	Total	Local	Rapid	Special Rapid	Transfers	Location	
↑ Through service to/from the JR Kyoto Line ↑
Tōkaidō	A 63	Kobe 神戸	1.7 (1.1)	33.1 (20.6)	●	●	●	A JR Kyōto Line (Tōkaidō Main Line); Kobe Kosoku Line (HS 35: Kōsoku Kōbe); Kobe Municipal Subway: Kaigan Line (K04: Harborland)	Chuo-ku, Kobe	Hyōgo
San'yō	A 63	Kobe 神戸	1.7 (1.1)	33.1 (20.6)	●	●	●	A JR Kyōto Line (Tōkaidō Main Line); Kobe Kosoku Line (HS 35: Kōsoku Kōbe); Kobe Municipal Subway: Kaigan Line (K04: Harborland)	Chuo-ku, Kobe	Hyōgo
San'yō	A 64	Hyōgo 兵庫	1.8 (1.1)	34.9 (21.7)	●	●	|	Wadamisaki Line (San'yō Main Line)	Hyogo-ku, Kobe	Hyōgo
San'yō	A 65	Shin-Nagata 新長田	2.3 (1.4)	37.2 (23.1)	●	|	|	Kobe Municipal Subway: Seishin-Yamate Line (S09); Kaigan Line (K10)	Nagata-ku, Kobe	Hyōgo
San'yō	A 66	Takatori 鷹取	1.0 (0.62)	38.2 (23.7)	●	|	|		Suma-ku, Kobe	Hyōgo
San'yō	A 67	Suma-Kaihinkōen 須磨海浜公園	0.9 (0.56)	39.1 (24.3)	●	|	|		Suma-ku, Kobe	Hyōgo
San'yō	A 68	Suma 須磨	1.3 (0.81)	40.4 (25.1)	●	▲	|	Sanyo Railway Main Line (SY 06: Sanyo Suma Station)	Suma-ku, Kobe	Hyōgo
San'yō	A 69	Shioya 塩屋	2.0 (1.2)	43.3 (26.9)	●	|	|	Sanyo Railway Main Line (SY 08: Sanyo Shioya Station)	Tarumi-ku, Kobe	Hyōgo
San'yō	A 70	Tarumi 垂水	2.9 (1.8)	46.2 (28.7)	●	▲	|	Sanyo Railway Main Line (SY 11: Sanyo Tarumi Station)	Tarumi-ku, Kobe	Hyōgo
San'yō	A 71	Maiko 舞子	2.0 (1.2)	48.2 (30.0)	●	▲	|	Sanyo Railway Main Line (SY 13: Maiko-koen Station)	Tarumi-ku, Kobe	Hyōgo
San'yō	A 72	Asagiri 朝霧	1.9 (1.2)	50.1 (31.1)	●	|	|		Akashi	Hyōgo
San'yō	A 73	Akashi 明石	2.4 (1.5)	52.5 (32.6)	●	●	●	Sanyo Railway Main Line (SY 17: Sanyo Akashi Station)	Akashi	Hyōgo
San'yō	A 74	Nishi-Akashi 西明石	3.4 (2.1)	55.9 (34.7)	●	●	●	San'yō Shinkansen	Akashi	Hyōgo
San'yō	A 75	Okubo 大久保	2.8 (1.7)	58.7 (36.5)	○	●	|		Akashi	Hyōgo
San'yō	A 76	Uozumi 魚住	3.5 (2.2)	62.2 (38.6)	○	●	|		Akashi	Hyōgo
San'yō	A 77	Tsuchiyama 土山	3.1 (1.9)	65.3 (40.6)	○	●	|		Harima	Hyōgo
San'yō	A 78	Higashi-Kakogawa 東加古川	3.3 (2.1)	68.6 (42.6)	○	●	|		Kakogawa	Hyōgo
San'yō	A 79	Kakogawa 加古川	3.6 (2.2)	72.2 (44.9)	○	●	●	I Kakogawa Line	Kakogawa	Hyōgo
San'yō	A 80	Hoden 宝殿	3.3 (2.1)	75.5 (46.9)		●	|		Takasago	Hyōgo
San'yō	A 81	Sone 曽根	4.0 (2.5)	79.5 (49.4)		●	|		Takasago	Hyōgo
San'yō	A 82	Himeji Bessho ひめじ別所	2.0 (1.2)	81.5 (50.6)		●	|		Himeji	Hyōgo
San'yō	A 83	Gochaku 御着	2.1 (1.3)	83.6 (51.9)		●	|		Himeji	Hyōgo
San'yō	A 84	Higashi-Himeji 東姫路	2.4 (1.5)	86.0 (53.4)		●	|		Himeji	Hyōgo
San'yō	A 85	Himeji 姫路	1.9 (1.2)	87.9 (54.6)		●	●	San'yō Shinkansen; A San'yō Line; J Bantan Line; K Kishin Line; Sanyo Railway Main Line (SY 43: Sanyo Himeji)	Himeji	Hyōgo
↓ Through service to/from the San'yō Main Line (below) ↓

=== From Himeji to Itozaki ===
- All trains except Limited Express trains stop at all stations in this section.
- Rapid trains coming from Osaka/Kobe area become local trains after Akashi and Special Rapid trains stop at all stations west of Himeji, operating up to Kamigōri or through to the Akō Line.

No.	Station	Distance in km (mi)	Transfers	Location	
↑ Through service to/from the San'yō Main Line (above) ↑
A 85	Himeji 姫路	54.8 (34.1)	San'yō Shinkansen; A JR Kōbe Line (San'yō Main Line) ( A85 ); J Bantan Line; K Kishin Line; Sanyo Railway Main Line (SY 43: Sanyo Himeji)	Himeji	Hyōgo
	Tegarayamaheiwakōen 手柄山平和公園	56.6 (35.2)		Himeji	Hyōgo
	Agaho 英賀保	59.4 (36.9)		Himeji	Hyōgo
	Harima-Katsuhara はりま勝原	62.2 (38.6)		Himeji	Hyōgo
	Aboshi 網干	65.1 (40.5)		Himeji	Hyōgo
	Tatsuno 竜野	71.0 (44.1)		Tatsuno	Hyōgo
	Aioi 相生	75.5 (46.9)	San'yō Shinkansen; A Akō Line	Aioi	Hyōgo
	Une 有年	83.1 (51.6)		Akō	Hyōgo
	Kamigōri 上郡	89.6 (55.7)	Chizu Express Chizu Line	Kamigōri, Akō	Hyōgo
S 11	Mitsuishi 三石	102.4 (63.6)		Bizen	Okayama
S 10	Yoshinaga 吉永	109.5 (68.0)		Bizen	Okayama
S 09	Wake 和気	114.8 (71.3)		Wake, Wake	Okayama
S 08	Kumayama 熊山	119.4 (74.2)		Akaiwa	Okayama
S 07	Mantomi 万富	123.5 (76.7)		Higashi-ku, Okayama	Okayama
S 06	Seto 瀬戸	128.0 (79.5)		Higashi-ku, Okayama	Okayama
S 05	Jōtō 上道	132.7 (82.5)		Higashi-ku, Okayama	Okayama
S 04	Higashi-Okayama 東岡山	136.1 (84.6)	N Akō Line	Naka-ku, Okayama	Okayama
S 03	Takashima 高島	138.9 (86.3)		Naka-ku, Okayama	Okayama
S 02	Nishigawara 西川原	140.8 (87.5)		Naka-ku, Okayama	Okayama
S 01; W 01	Okayama 岡山	143.4 (89.1)	San'yō Shinkansen; L Uno Line (M Seto-Ōhashi Line); T Tsuyama Line; U Kibi Line (Momotarō Line); Okayama Electric Tramway (both at Okayama-Ekimae): 1. Higashiyama Line; 2. Seikibashi Line	Kita-ku, Okayama	Okayama
	Nishi-Okayama Freight Terminal 西岡山(貨)	145.9 (90.7)		Kita-ku, Okayama	Okayama
W 02	Kitanagase 北長瀬	146.8 (91.2)		Kita-ku, Okayama	Okayama
W 03	Niwase 庭瀬	149.9 (93.1)		Kita-ku, Okayama	Okayama
W 04	Nakashō 中庄	154.6 (96.1)		Kurashiki	Okayama
W 05	Kurashiki 倉敷	159.3 (99.0)	V Hakubi Line; Mizushima Main Line (Kurashikishi)	Kurashiki	Okayama
W 06	Nishiachi 西阿知	163.3 (101.5)		Kurashiki	Okayama
W 07	Shin-Kurashiki 新倉敷	168.6 (104.8)	San'yō Shinkansen	Kurashiki	Okayama
W 08	Konkō 金光	174.9 (108.7)		Asakuchi	Okayama
W 09	Kamogata 鴨方	178.4 (110.9)		Asakuchi	Okayama
W 10	Satoshō 里庄	182.4 (113.3)		Satoshō, Asakuchi	Okayama
W 11	Kasaoka 笠岡	187.1 (116.3)		Kasaoka	Okayama
W 12	Daimon 大門	194.2 (120.7)		Fukuyama	Hiroshima
W 13	Higashi-Fukuyama 東福山	197.5 (122.7)		Fukuyama	Hiroshima
W 14; X 14	Fukuyama 福山	201.7 (125.3)	JR West; Z Fukuen Line	Fukuyama	Hiroshima
X 15	Bingo-Akasaka 備後赤坂	207.5 (128.9)		Fukuyama	Hiroshima
X 16	Matsunaga 松永	212.4 (132.0)		Fukuyama	Hiroshima
X 17	Higashi-Onomichi 東尾道	215.3 (133.8)		Onomichi	Hiroshima
X 18	Onomichi 尾道	221.8 (137.8)		Onomichi	Hiroshima
X 19; G 17	Itozaki 糸崎	230.9 (143.5)		Mihara	Hiroshima
↓ Through service to/from the San'yō Main Line (below) ↓

=== From Itozaki to Iwakuni (Hiroshima City Network) ===
Akiji Liner rapid service operates through to the Kure Line

City Liner rapid service, limited weekend service only

●: All trains stop
｜: Trains pass at all times
○: All trains stop, limited service

No.	Station	Distance in km (mi)	Akiji Liner	City Liner	Transfers	Location	
↑ Through service to/from the San'yō Main Line (above) ↑
X 19; G 17	Itozaki 糸崎	230.9 (143.5)				Mihara	Hiroshima
X 20; G 16	Mihara 三原	233.3 (145.0)			San'yō Shinkansen; Y Kure Line	Mihara	Hiroshima
G 15	Hongō 本郷	242.8 (150.9)				Mihara	Hiroshima
G 14	Kōchi 河内	255.1 (158.5)				Higashihiroshima	Hiroshima
G 13	Nyūno 入野	259.5 (161.2)				Higashihiroshima	Hiroshima
G 12	Shiraichi 白市	263.9 (164.0)				Higashihiroshima	Hiroshima
G 11	Nishitakaya 西高屋	268.3 (166.7)				Higashihiroshima	Hiroshima
G 10	Saijō 西条	272.9 (169.6)				Higashihiroshima	Hiroshima
G 09	Jike 寺家	275.2 (171.0)				Higashihiroshima	Hiroshima
G 08	Hachihommatsu 八本松	278.9 (173.3)				Higashihiroshima	Hiroshima
G 07	Seno 瀬野	289.5 (179.9)				Aki-ku, Hiroshima	Hiroshima
G 06	Nakanohigashi 中野東	292.4 (181.7)				Aki-ku, Hiroshima	Hiroshima
G 05	Aki-Nakano 安芸中野	294.4 (182.9)				Aki-ku, Hiroshima	Hiroshima
G 04	Kaitaichi 海田市	298.3 (185.4)	●		Y Kure Line	Kaita, Aki	Hiroshima
G 03	Mukainada 向洋	300.6 (186.8)	｜			Fuchū, Aki	Hiroshima
G 02	Tenjingawa 天神川	302.4 (187.9)	｜			Minami-ku, Hiroshima	Hiroshima
	Hiroshima Freight Terminal 広島貨物ターミナル	303.1 (188.3)	｜			Minami-ku, Hiroshima	Hiroshima
G 01; R 01	Hiroshima 広島	304.7 (189.3)	●	●	San'yō Shinkansen; P Geibi Line; 1 2 5 6 Hiroden Main Line (M01)	Minami-ku, Hiroshima	Hiroshima
R 02	Shin-Hakushima 新白島	306.5 (190.5)	○	｜	B Kabe Line; Astram Line	Nishi-ku, Hiroshima	Hiroshima
R 03	Yokogawa 横川	307.7 (191.2)	○	●	B Kabe Line; 7 8 Hiroden Yokogawa Line (Y04)	Nishi-ku, Hiroshima	Hiroshima
R 04	Nishi-Hiroshima 西広島	310.2 (192.7)	○	｜	2 3 Hiroden Yokogawa Line (Hiroden-nishi-hiroshima: M19)	Nishi-ku, Hiroshima	Hiroshima
R 05	Shin-Inokuchi 新井口	314.4 (195.4)	○	｜	2 Hiroden Yokogawa Line (Shoko Center-iriguchi: M24)	Nishi-ku, Hiroshima	Hiroshima
R 06	Itsukaichi 五日市	316.8 (196.9)	○	●	2 Hiroden Yokogawa Line (Hiroden-itsukaichi: M27)	Saeki-ku, Hiroshima	Hiroshima
R 07	Hatsukaichi 廿日市	320.2 (199.0)	○	｜	2 Hiroden Yokogawa Line (Hiroden-hatsukaichi: M31)	Hatsukaichi	Hiroshima
R 08	Miyauchi-Kushido 宮内串戸	321.8 (200.0)	○	｜	2 Hiroden Yokogawa Line (Miyauchi: M33)	Hatsukaichi	Hiroshima
R 09	Ajina 阿品	324.8 (201.8)	○	｜	2 Hiroden Yokogawa Line (Hiroden-ajina: M37)	Hatsukaichi	Hiroshima
R 10	Miyajimaguchi 宮島口	326.5 (202.9)	○	●	2 Hiroden Yokogawa Line (Hiroden-miyajima-guchi: M38); JR Miyajima Ferry	Hatsukaichi	Hiroshima
R 11	Maezora 前空	328.3 (204.0)	○	｜		Hatsukaichi	Hiroshima
R 12	Ōnoura 大野浦	331.4 (205.9)	○	●		Hatsukaichi	Hiroshima
R 13	Kuba 玖波	336.4 (209.0)	○	●		Ōtake	Hiroshima
R 14	Ōtake 大竹	340.8 (211.8)	○	●		Ōtake	Hiroshima
R 15	Waki 和木	342.3 (212.7)	○	●		Waki, Kuga	Yamaguchi
R 16	Iwakuni 岩国	346.1 (215.1)	○	●	■ Gantoku Line	Iwakuni	Yamaguchi
↓ Through service to/from the San'yō Main Line (below) ↓

=== Iwakuni to Moji ===
- All trains stop at all stations in this section

No.	Station	Distance in km (mi)	Transfers	Location	
↑ Through service to/from the San'yō Main Line (above) ↑
R 16	Iwakuni 岩国	346.1 (215.1)	■ Gantoku Line	Iwakuni	Yamaguchi
	Minami-Iwakuni 南岩国	350.7 (217.9)		Iwakuni	Yamaguchi
	Fujū 藤生	353.4 (219.6)		Iwakuni	Yamaguchi
	Tsuzu 通津	358.6 (222.8)		Iwakuni	Yamaguchi
	Yū 由宇	361.6 (224.7)		Iwakuni	Yamaguchi
	Kōjiro 神代	366.8 (227.9)		Iwakuni	Yamaguchi
	Ōbatake 大畠	371.9 (231.1)		Yanai	Yamaguchi
	Yanaiminato 柳井港	376.4 (233.9)		Yanai	Yamaguchi
	Yanai 柳井	379.2 (235.6)		Yanai	Yamaguchi
	Tabuse 田布施	385.4 (239.5)		Tabuse, Kumage	Yamaguchi
	Iwata 岩田	390.9 (242.9)		Hikari	Yamaguchi
	Shimata 島田	395.9 (246.0)		Hikari	Yamaguchi
	Hikari 光	400.7 (249.0)		Hikari	Yamaguchi
	Kudamatsu 下松	406.9 (252.8)		Kudamatsu	Yamaguchi
	Kushigahama 櫛ヶ浜	411.5 (255.7)		Shūnan	Yamaguchi
	Tokuyama 徳山	414.9 (257.8)	San'yō Shinkansen	Shūnan	Yamaguchi
	Shinnan-yō 新南陽	419.0 (260.4)		Shūnan	Yamaguchi
	Fukugawa 福川	421.9 (262.2)		Shūnan	Yamaguchi
	Heta 戸田	425.7 (264.5)		Shūnan	Yamaguchi
	Tonomi 富海	434.2 (269.8)		Hōfu	Yamaguchi
	Hōfu Freight Terminal 防府(貨)	437.2 (271.7)		Hōfu	Yamaguchi
	Hōfu 防府	441.4 (274.3)		Hōfu	Yamaguchi
	Daidō 大道	449.2 (279.1)		Hōfu	Yamaguchi
	Yotsutsuji 四辻	454.0 (282.1)		Yamaguchi	Yamaguchi
	Shin-Yamaguchi 新山口	459.2 (285.3)	San'yō Shinkansen; Ube Line; Yamaguchi Line	Yamaguchi	Yamaguchi
	Kagawa 嘉川	463.2 (287.8)		Yamaguchi	Yamaguchi
	Hon-Yura 本由良	467.7 (290.6)		Yamaguchi	Yamaguchi
	Kotō 厚東	478.0 (297.0)		Ube	Yamaguchi
	Ube 宇部	484.5 (301.1)	Ube Line	Ube	Yamaguchi
	Onoda 小野田	488.0 (303.2)	Onoda Line	Sanyōonoda	Yamaguchi
	Asa 厚狭	494.3 (307.1)	San'yō Shinkansen; Mine Line	Sanyōonoda	Yamaguchi
	Habu 埴生	502.6 (312.3)		Sanyōonoda	Yamaguchi
	Ozuki 小月	508.8 (316.2)		Shimonoseki	Yamaguchi
	Chōfu 長府	515.0 (320.0)		Shimonoseki	Yamaguchi
	Shin-Shimonoseki 新下関	520.9 (323.7)	San'yō Shinkansen	Shimonoseki	Yamaguchi
	Hatabu 幡生	524.6 (326.0)	San'in Main Line	Shimonoseki	Yamaguchi
JA 53	Shimonoseki 下関	528.1 (328.1)		Shimonoseki	Yamaguchi
JA 52	Moji 門司	534.4 (332.1)	JA Kagoshima Main Line (JA29)	Moji-ku, Kitakyushu	Fukuoka

== Rolling stock ==
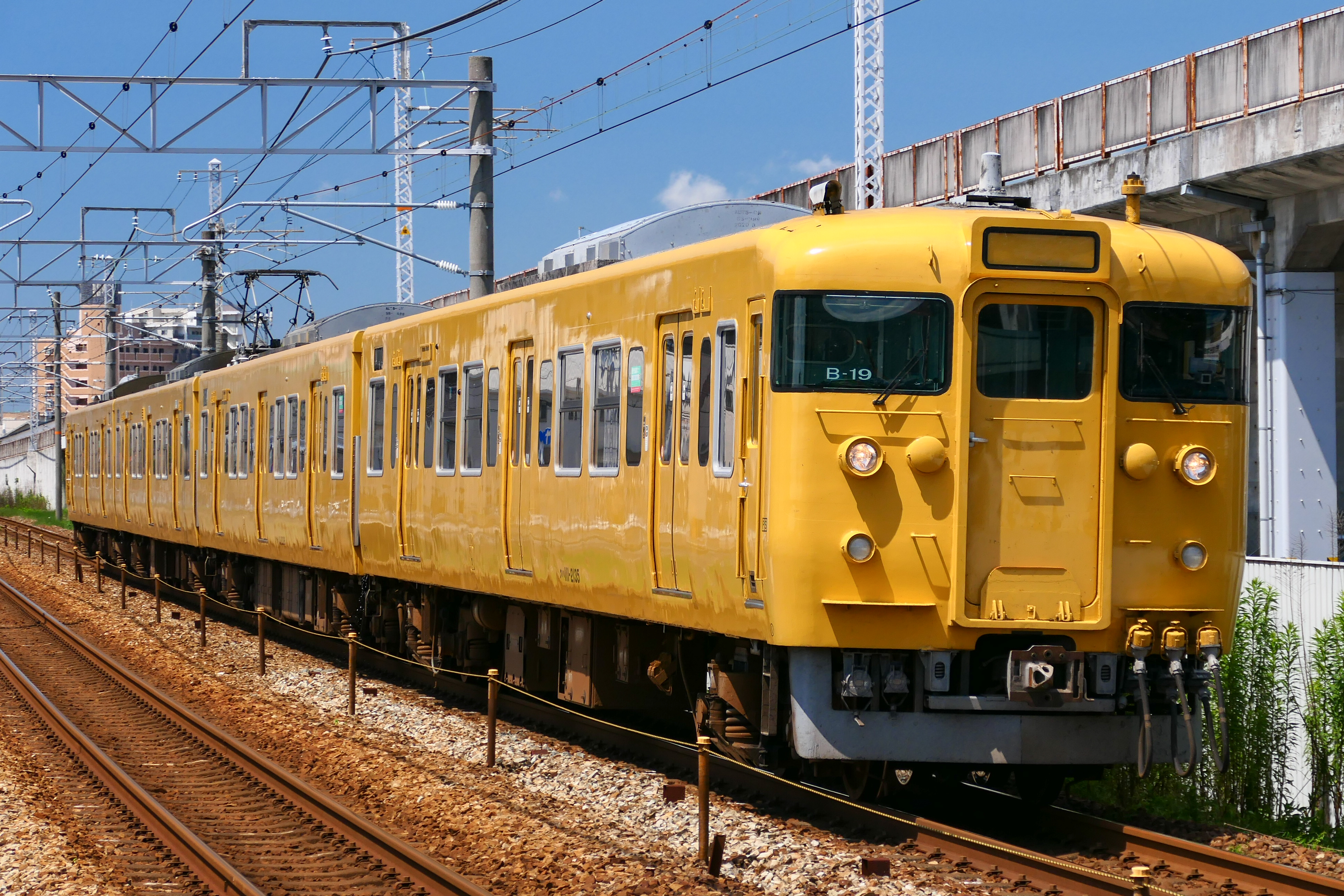
JR West 113 series EMU

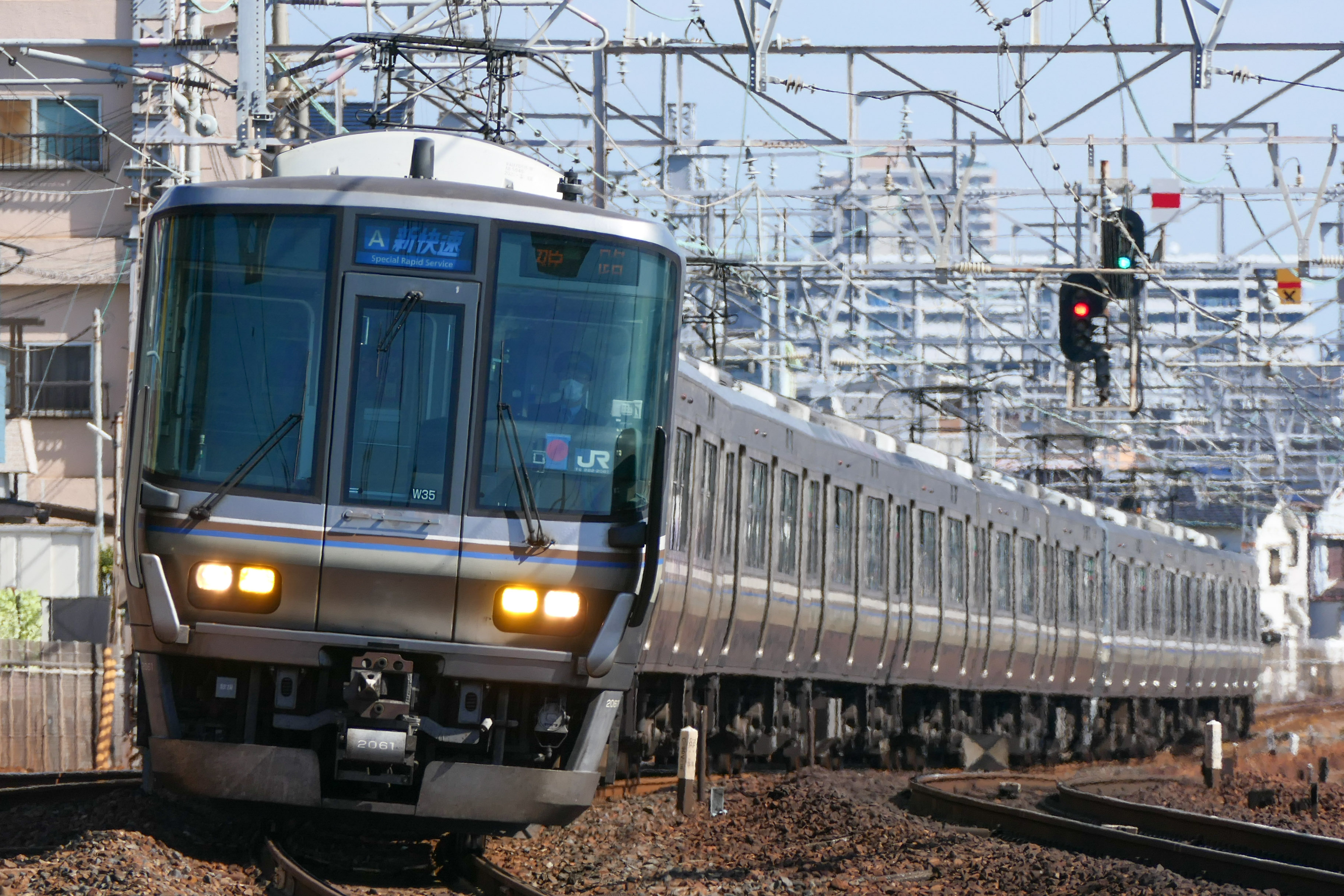
JR West 223 series EMU

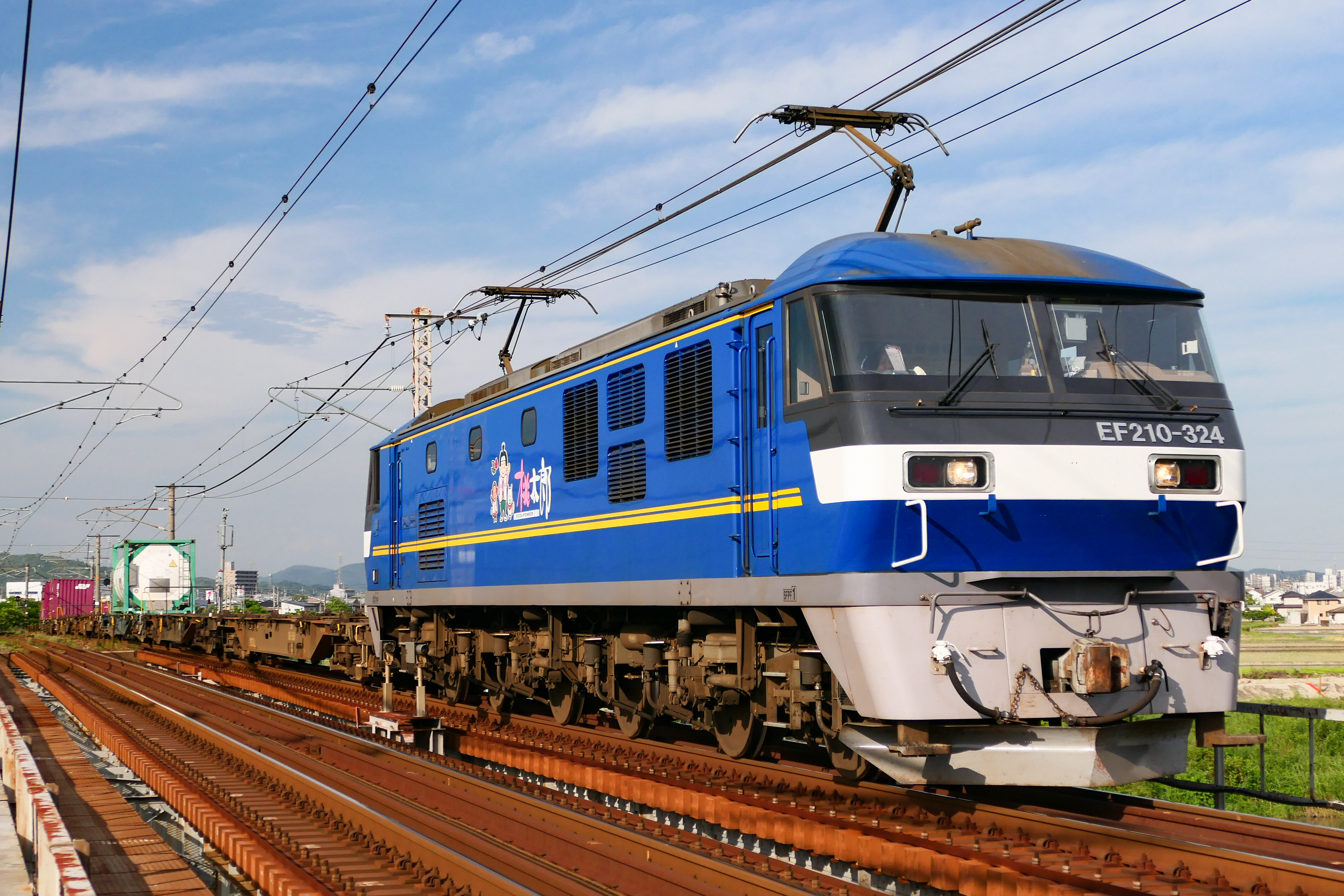
Freight train with Class EF210 locomotive

=== JR West ===
==== Limited Express ====
- 285 series EMUs (Sunrise Izumo/Sunrise Seto service)
- 273 series EMUs (Yakumo service)
- KiHa 187 series DMUs (Super Inaba service)
- Chizu Express HOT7000 series (Super Hakuto service)

==== Local trains ====
- 105 series EMUs
- 113 series EMUs
- 115 series EMUs
- 117 series EMUs
- 123 series EMUs
- 207 series EMUs
- 213 series EMUs
- 221 series EMUs
- 223-1000/2000/6000 series EMUs
- 225-0/100 series EMUs
- 321 series EMUs
- 227-0/500 series EMUs

=== JR Kyushu ===
- 415-1500 series EMUs

== History ==
The entire line between Kobe Station and Shimonoseki Station was originally opened by the private Sanyō Railway company. The section between Hyōgo Station (in Kobe) and Akashi Station (in Akashi, Hyōgo) opened first in 1888. In 1889 the line was extended to the east to Kobe Station (as a dual track section) and Tatsuno Station (in Tatsuno, Hyōgo Prefecture) to the west. The Sanyō Railway was progressively extended to the west, reaching Okayama and then Fukuyama in 1891, Hiroshima in 1894 and in 1901 it reached Bakan (now Shimonoseki) Station. Under the Railway Nationalization Act of 1906 it was purchased by the Japanese government and renamed Sanyō Main Line.

=== Duplication ===
The Hyogo – Himeji section was duplicated in 1899, and the Hiroshima – Kaitaichi section in 1903. After the line was nationalised, further duplications occurred between Kamigori – Yoshinaga in 1910/11, Hatabu – Shimonoseki in 1915 and Himeji – Agaho in 1917. Work to duplicate the remainder of the line commenced in 1921, and opened in stages until completed in 1930, with the exception of the section between Iwakuni and Kushigahama, where construction of a new direct line had commenced. This direct line, which bypassed the coastal section via Yanai involved significant tunnelling, and unexpected geological instability delayed completion of the line until 1934, and then as a single track. Although the new line became the Sanyo Main Line at that time, in 1944 the original coastal alignment was duplicated and returned to the formal Sanyo Main Line, with the former bypass line becoming the Gantoku Line.

=== Electrification ===
The Kobe – Akashi section was electrified in 1934, extended to Himeji in 1958, Hiroshima in 1962 and (except for the Wadamisaki Line, which was electrified in 2001) the entire line was electrified in 1964, to coincide with the opening of the Tōkaidō Shinkansen between Tokyo and Shin-Osaka the same year.

=== Deviation/extension ===
The San'yō Main Line approximately parallels the Inland Sea but some sections could be shortened by tunnels. In 1934, the Gantoku Line between Iwakuni and Tokuyama was opened and replaced the former line which traverses Yanai adjacent to the Inland Sea. In 1944, this new alignment was replaced again by the previous coastal alignment because the coastal line was upgraded to dual tracks.

The San'yō Main Line was connected to Kyushu by ferry from Shimonoseki and Shimonosekiko Station (Port Shimonoseki). In 1942, the Kanmon Tunnel under the Kanmon Straits was completed and the San'yō Main Line was extended to Moji Station. A second tunnel duplicating the section opened in 1944.

=== Service variations ===
Prior to the opening of the San'yō Shinkansen, many expresses operated on the San'yō Main Line as it served as a major transport corridor through Western Honshu and connecting to Kyushu. The Shinkansen was extended as the San'yō Shinkansen line, first to Okayama Station in 1972, and then to Hakata Station in 1975. On both occasions, many express services on the San'yō Main Line were withdrawn, and since 1972, the line has been mainly used by local and freight services. CTC signalling was commissioned between Mihara and Shimonoseki in 1984.

=== Service disruptions ===
The section between Kobe and Nishi Akashi was severely damaged by the 1995 Great Hanshin earthquake, and took ten weeks to repair.

The 2018 Japan floods resulted in the Okayama – Shimonoseki section closing on 6 July 2018. The majority of services were restored between 8 July – 18 July of that year, but the Yanai – Tokuyama section remained out of service until 9 September of that year.

=== Former connecting lines ===
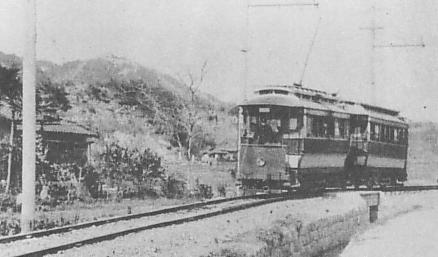
Iwakuni Electric Railway train

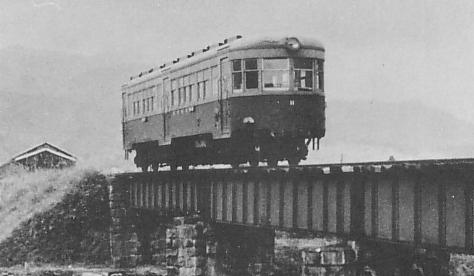
A Nagato Railway train

- Hyogo station – A 5 km lne to the Hyogo Port operated between 1911 and 1984.
- Tsuchiyama station – A 4 km line to Befu-Ko operated between 1923 and 1984. It is connected to the Sanyo Electric Railway Main Line at Befu.
- Kakogawa station – The Banshu Railway Co. opened an 8 km (5.0 mi) line to Takasago-Minato in 1913/1914. The line was nationalised in 1943, and closed in 1984.
- Himeji station – The Bantan Railway Co. built a 16 km (9.9 mi) line east to Shikama-Kou (near Kakogawa), opened in 1895 and closed in 1986.
- Aboshi station –

The Tatsuno Electric Railway Co. opened a 17 km (11 mi) 1,435 mm (4 ft 8 1/2 in) gauge line electrified at 600 VDC from Shingu-Cho to Aboshiko between 1909 and 1915 which connected at this station. The line closed in 1934.

A 6 km line to Hamadako operated between 1943 and 1989.

- Une station – The Ako Railway operated a 13 km (8.1 mi) 762 mm (2 ft 6 in) gauge line to Banshu-Ako on the Ako Line between 1921 and 1951.
- Wake station – The Dowa Mining Co. opened a 34 km (21 mi) line between Nishi-Katakamito on the Ako Line and Yanahara, to haul iron sulphide ore, between 1923 and 1931. Passenger services commenced in 1931, freight services ceased in 1988 and the line closed in 1991.
- Takashima station – The Saidaiji Railway Company operated a 915 mm (3 ft) gauge line between its namesake town and Korakuen between 1911 and 1962.
- Kasaoka station – The Ikasa Railway Co. operated a 19 km (12 mi) 762 mm (2 ft 6 in) gauge line to Ihara between 1913 and 1971. It had a 6 km branch from Kitagawa to Yakage that operated between 1921 and 1967. At Ihara it connected to the company's line to Kannabe on the Fukuen Line.
- Fukuyama station – The Tomo Light Railway Co. operated a 13 km (8.1 mi) 762 mm (2 ft 6 in) gauge line to its namesake town between 1913/1914 and 1954.
- Onomichi station – The Hiroshima Prefectural Government opened a 17 km (11 mi) line electrified at 600 V DC to Shoharachi in 1925/1926. It closed between 1957 and 1964.
- Seno Station – The 1.3 km (0.81 mi) Skyrail Midorizaka Line monorail connected Midori-Chūō Station with Seno (Skyrail's Midoriguchi Station) from 1998 to 2024.
- Hiroshima station – The Sanyo Railway Co. was commissioned by the Japanese Army to build a 6 km (3.7 mi) line to Ujina Port following the outbreak of the First Sino-Japanese War in 1894. In 1897 the company leased the line from the Army and commenced a passenger service, and when the company was nationalised in 1906, ownership of the line transferred from the Army to JGR. The Army leased the line in 1915 for use during WW1 and subsequent hostilities in China, and passenger services were suspended between 1919 and 1930. The line was not damaged by the atomic bomb attack, but was damaged by Typhoon Marurazaki which hit the area 6 weeks later. Passenger service ceased in 1972, and the line closed in 1986.

The Kirin Brewery operated a 2 km (1.2 mi) line to its complex between 1937 and 1986.

- Iwakuni station – The Iwakuni Electric Railway Co. opened a 6 km line to Shinmachi, electrified at 600 V DC, between 1909 and 1912. The line closed in 1929 when the parallel Gantoku Line opened.
- Hofu station – A 19 km (12 mi) line to Hori operated 1919/1920 to 1964.
- Shin-Yamaguchi station – The Dainippon Railway Co. opened a 13 km (8.1 mi) line from Ogori (as Shin-Yamaguchi was called until 2003) to Yamaguchi in 1908, which closed in 1913 -when the JGR opened its parallel line.
- Ube station – The Funaki Railway Co. opened a 6 km (3.7 mi) 762 mm (2 ft 6 in) gauge line in 1916. The line was converted to 1067mm gauge in 1922, and extended 12 km (7.5 mi) to Kibe in 1926. The last 8 km (5.0 mi) closed in 1944, and the rest of the line in 1961.
- Ozuki station – The Nagato Railway Co. opened an 18 km (11 mi) line to Nishi-Cho in 1918. JGR assumed control of the line as a wartime measure in 1942, a situation that continued until 1949. The line closed in 1956.
- Hatabu station – The Choshu Railway opened a 27 km (17 mi) line from Higashi-Shimonoseki to Kogushi via Hatabu in 1914. A proposed extension to Nagato was not built due to funding constraints. The part from Hatabu to Kogushi was nationalised in 1925, with the Hatabu station being moved to its present location in 1928, and the line becoming a part of the San'in Main Line in 1933. The remaining 2.2 km (1.4 mi) Choshu Railway line from Hatabu to Higashi-Shimonoseki was electrified at 600 V DC in 1926. The company merged with the Sanyo Electric Railway (today Sanden Kotsu, not to be confused with the eponymous company operating in the Hyōgo Prefecture) in 1928, and the line was extended to Karato in 1932 in order to connect it to the Sanyo Electric Chōfu to Hikoshima-Guchi line. The line was closed in 1971.

== See also ==
- JR Kobe Line
