= Nakashō Station =

Railway station in Kurashiki, Okayama Prefecture, Japan

Nakashō Station 中庄駅
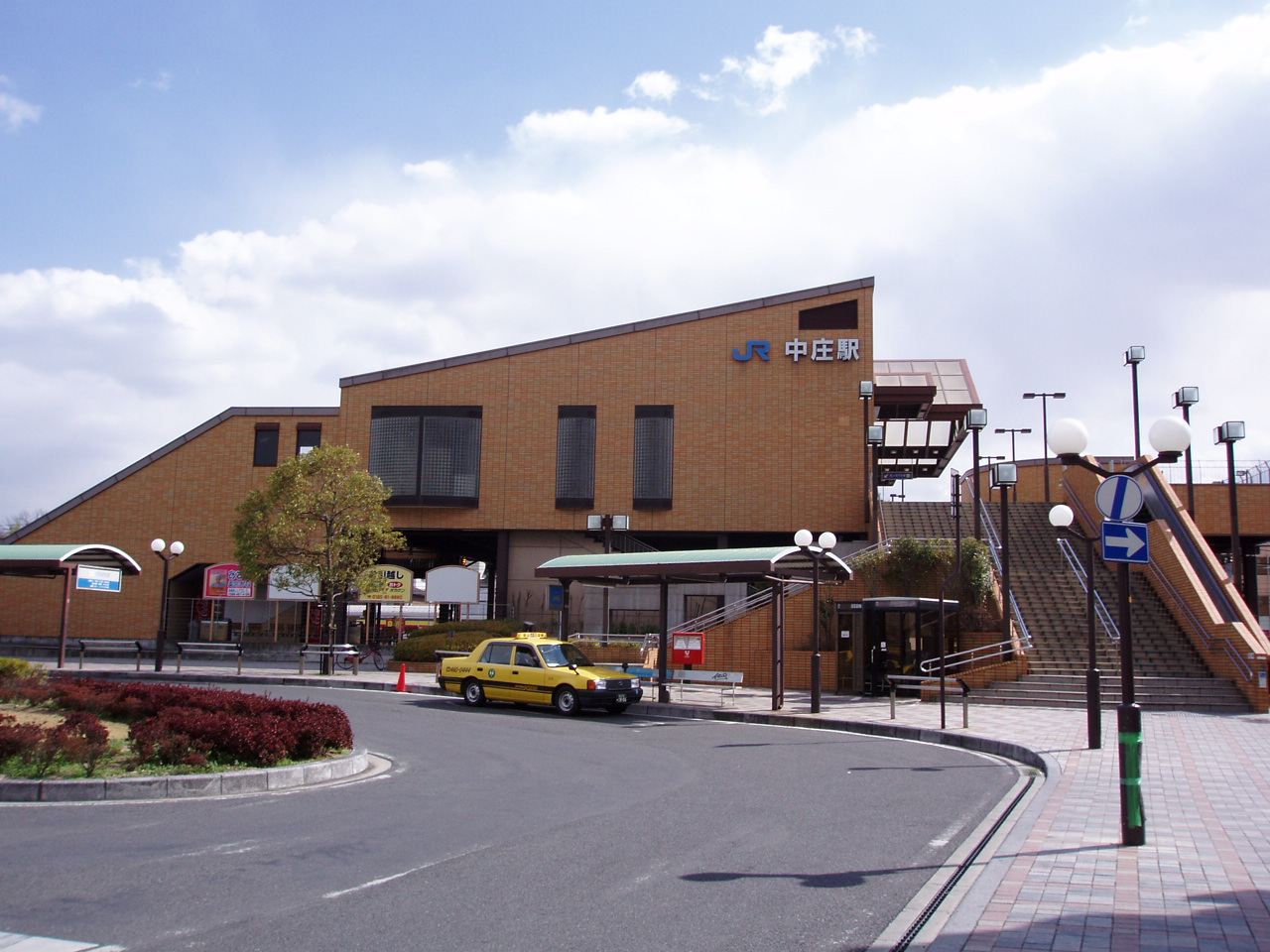
- Nakashō Station in March 2007

General information
- Location: Toba 35, Kurashiki-shi, Okayama-ken 710-0012; Japan
- Coordinates: 34°37′34.72″N 133°48′28.17″E
- Owner: West Japan Railway Company
- Operator: West Japan Railway Company
- Lines: W San'yō Main Line; (V Hakubi Line)
- Distance: 154.6 km (96.1 miles) from Kōbe
- Platforms: 1 side + 1 island platforms
- Connections: Bus stop

Other information
- Status: Staffed
- Station code: JR-W04（San'yō Main Line）; JR-V04（Hakubi Line）
- Website: Official website

History
- Opened: 11 March 1930; 96 years ago

Passengers
- FY2019: 7952 daily

Services
Preceding station	JR West	Following station
Kurashiki towards Fukuyama	San'yō Line Local	Niwase towards Okayama
Location
- Location within Okayama Prefecture Location within Japan

Nakashō Station (中庄駅, Nakashō-eki) is a passenger railway station located in the city of Kurashiki, Okayama Prefecture, Japan. It is operated by West Japan Railway Company (JR West).

== Lines ==
Nakashō Station is served by the San'yō Main Line, and is located 154.6 kilometers from the terminus of the line at Kōbe and 11.2 kilometers from Okayama. It is also served by trains of the Hakubi Line, which continue past the nominal terminus of that line at Kurashiki to terminate at Okayama.

== Station layout ==
The station consists of one side platform and one island platform connected by an elevated station building. The station is unattended. The outer wall of the station building is tiled in a similar color to the nearby Kawasaki Gakuen school building, and there is an artificial waterfall next to the stairs at the north exit.

=== Platforms ===
1	■ W San'yō Main Line	for Okayama
1	■ V Hakubi Line	for Okayama
2	■ W San'yō Main Line	siding, special events
3	■ W San'yō Main Line	for Kurashiki
3	■ V Hakubi Line	for Kurashiki, Niimi, Yonago

== History ==
Nakashō Station opened on March 11, 1930. With the privatization of the Japan National Railways (JNR) on April 1, 1987, the station came under the aegis of the West Japan Railway Company.

== Passenger statistics ==
In fiscal 2019, the station was used by an average of 7952 passengers daily.

== See also ==
- List of railway stations in Japan
