= Nishiachi Station =

Railway station in Okayama, Japan

Nishiachi Station 西阿知駅
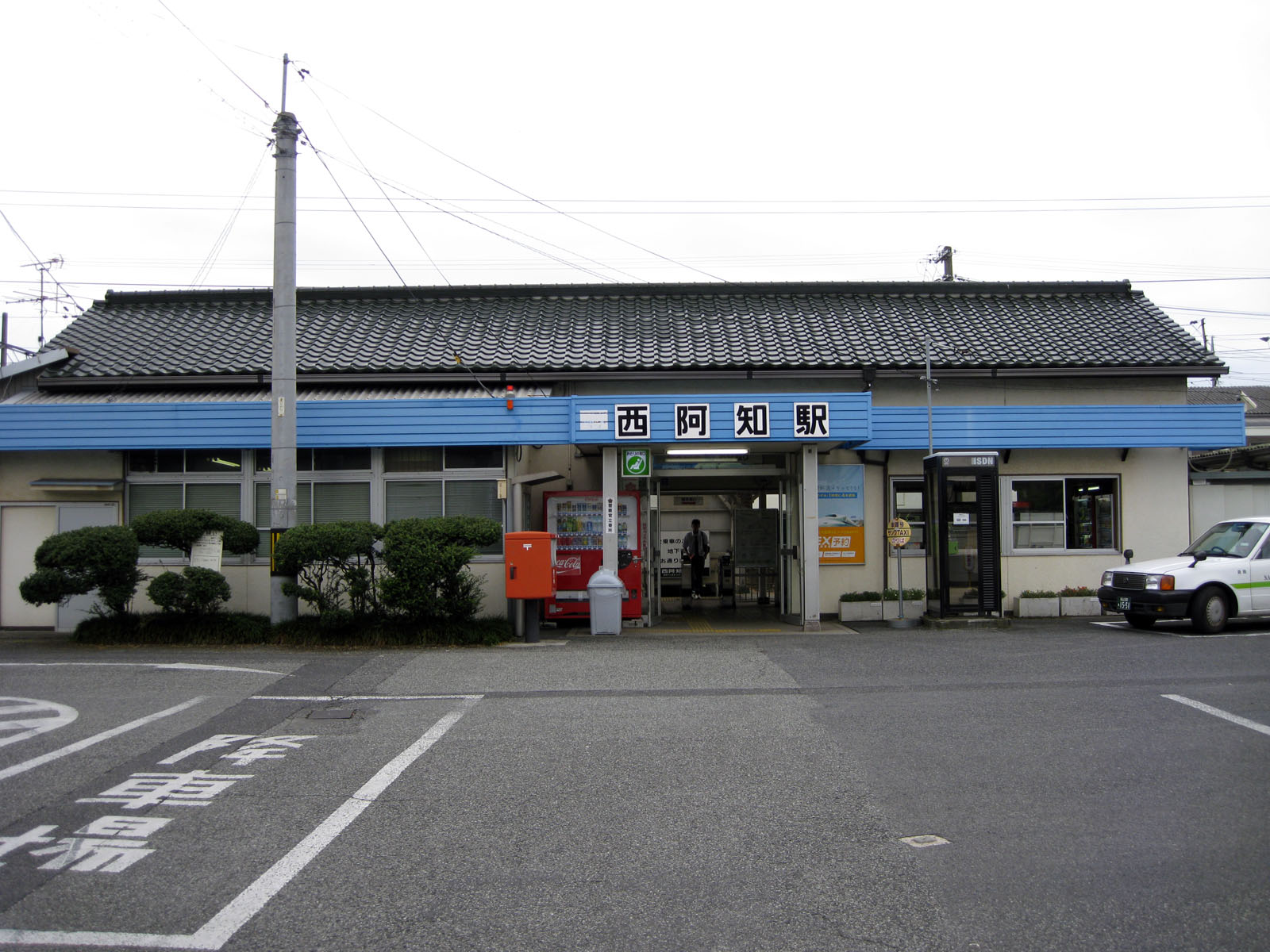
- Nishiachi Station in August 2009

General information
- Location: 1049 Nishiachi-chō, Kita-ku, Kurashiki-shi, Okayama-ken 710-0807; Japan
- Coordinates: 34°35′9.40″N 133°43′39.70″E
- Owner: West Japan Railway Company
- Operator: West Japan Railway Company
- Line: W San'yō Main Line
- Distance: 163.3 km (101.5 miles) from Kōbe
- Platforms: 1 island platform
- Connections: Bus stop

Other information
- Status: Unstaffed
- Station code: JR-W06（San'yō Main Line）
- Website: Official website

History
- Opened: 25 May 1920; 106 years ago

Passengers
- FY2019: 3185 daily

Services
Preceding station	JR West	Following station
Shin-Kurashiki towards Fukuyama	San'yō Line Local	Kurashiki towards Okayama
Location
- Location within Okayama Prefecture Location within Japan

Nishiachi Station (西阿知駅, Nishiachi-eki) is a passenger railway station located in the city of Kurashiki, Okayama Prefecture, Japan. It is operated by West Japan Railway Company (JR West).

== Lines ==
Nishiachi Station is served by the San'yō Main Line, and is located 163.3 kilometers from the terminus of the line at Kōbe.

== Station layout ==
The station consists of one ground-level island platform connected to the station building by an underground passage. The station is unattended.

=== Platforms ===
1	■ W San'yō Main Line	for Kurashiki and Okayama
2	■ W San'yō Main Line	for Shin-Kurashiki and Fukuyama

== History ==
Nishiachi Station opened on May 25, 1920. With the privatization of the Japan National Railways (JNR) on April 1, 1987, the station came under the aegis of the West Japan Railway Company.

== Passenger statistics ==
In fiscal 2019, the station was used by an average of 3185 passengers daily.

== See also ==
- List of railway stations in Japan
