= Shin-Kurashiki Station =

Railway station in Kurashiki, Okayama Prefecture, Japan

W 07 Shin-Kurashiki Station 新倉敷駅
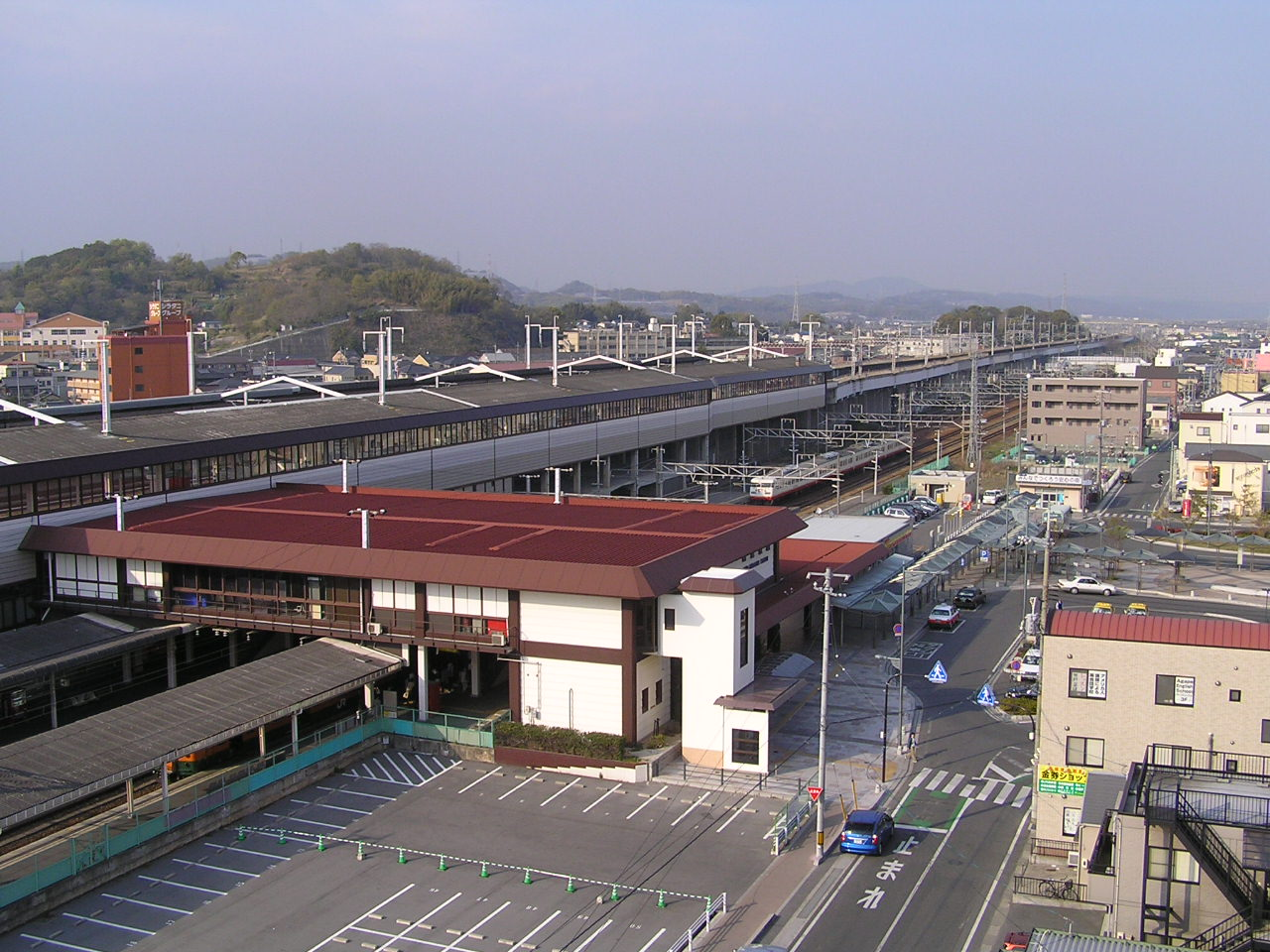
- Shin-Kurashiki Station south side in 2007

General information
- Location: 390-4 Tamashima Tsumasaki, Kurashiki-shi, Okayama-ken 710-0252; Japan
- Coordinates: 34°33′54.00″N 133°40′43.20″E
- Owner: West Japan Railway Company
- Operator: West Japan Railway Company
- Lines: San'yō Shinkansen; W San'yō Line
- Distance: 758.1 km (471.1 miles) from Tokyo
- Platforms: 3 side + 1 island platforms
- Connections: Bus stop

Other information
- Status: Staffed (Midori no Madoguchi )
- Station code: JR-W07
- Website: Official website

History
- Opened: 14 July 1891; 135 years ago
- Former names: Tamashima (to 1975)

Passengers
- FY2019: 7952 daily

Services
Preceding station	JR West	Following station
Fukuyama towards Hakata	San'yō Shinkansen Hikari	Okayama towards Shin-Ōsaka
Fukuyama towards Hakata or Hakataminami	San'yō Shinkansen Kodama	Okayama towards Shin-Ōsaka
Konkō W 08 towards Fukuyama	San'yō Line Local	Nishiachi W 06 towards Okayama
Location
- Location within Okayama Prefecture Location within Japan

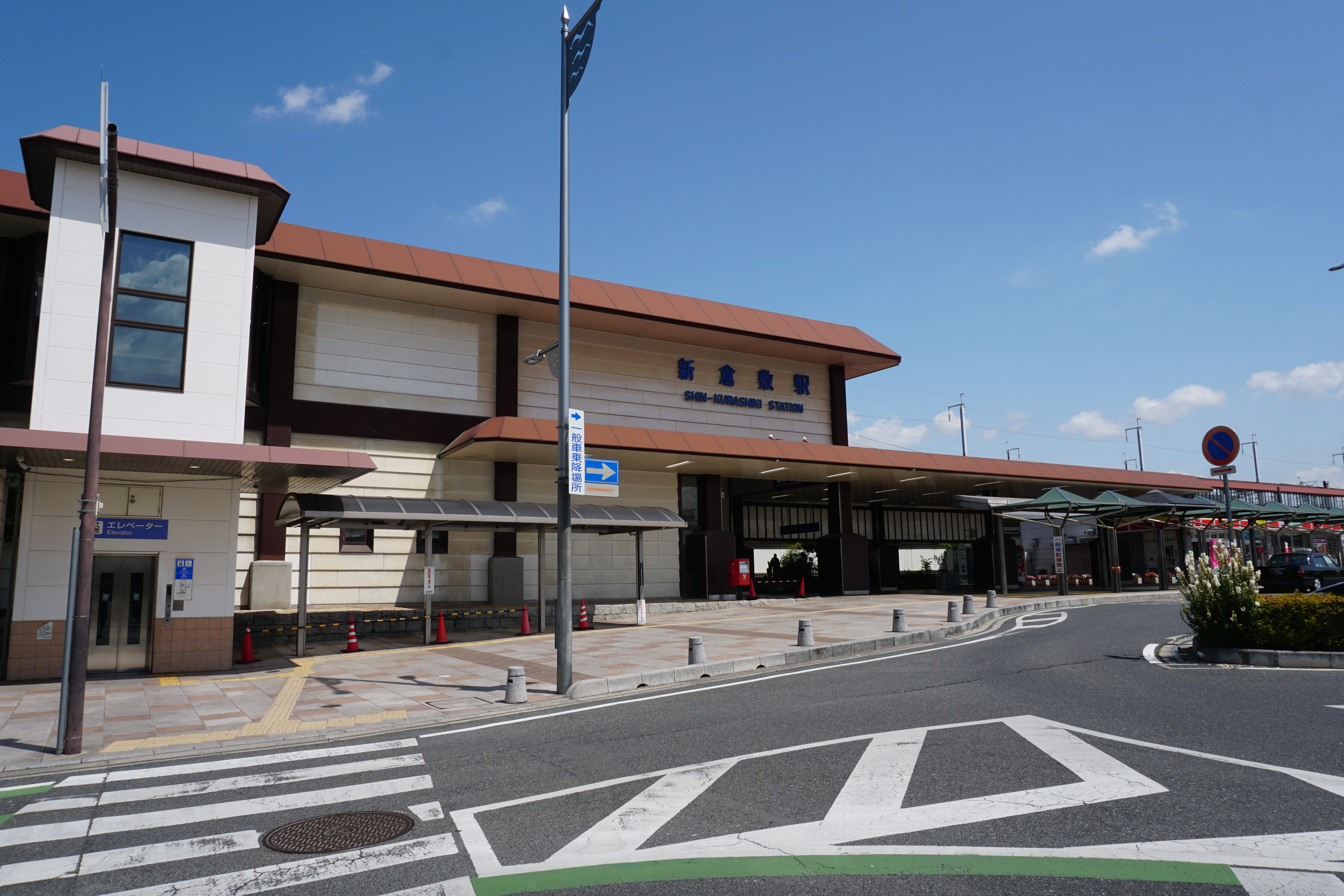
Shin-Kurashiki Station Building south exit

Shin-Kurashiki Station (Japanese: 新倉敷駅, Hepburn: Shin-Kurashiki-eki; lit. 'New Kurashiki Station') is a passenger railway station located in the city of Kurashiki, Okayama Prefecture, Japan. It is operated by West Japan Railway Company (JR West).

== Lines ==
Shin-Kurashiki Station is served by the Sanyo Shinkansen and is 205.5 kilometers from Shin-Osaka and 758.1 kilometers from Tokyo. As Shin-Kurashiki is a minor intermediate Shinkansen station, only Kodama all-stations services stop here. Local services are provided by the San'yō Main Line, and the station is located 168.6 kilometers from the terminus of the line at Kōbe.

== Station layout ==
The station consists of two elevated opposed side platforms for the Shinkansen services, and one ground-level side platform and ground-level island platform for local services. The platforms are connected by an elevated concourse which extends on the second story of the station building in between the Shinkansen and local platforms. The station is staffed and has a Midori no Madoguchi staffed ticket office.

=== Platforms ===
1	■ San'yō Shinkansen	for Hiroshima and Hakata
2	■ San'yō Shinkansen	for Shin-Osaka and Tokyo

3	■ W San'yō Main Line	for Fukuyama, Onomichi and Hiroshima
4, 5	■ W San'yō Main Line	for Kurashiki and Okayama

== History ==
Shin-Kurashiki Station opened on 14 July 1891, as Tamashima Station (玉島駅). It was renamed Shin-Kurashiki on 10 March 1975 at the same time the Shinkansen line opened. With the privatization of the Japan National Railways (JNR) on April 1, 1987, the station came under the aegis of the West Japan Railway Company.

== Passenger statistics ==
In fiscal 2019, the station was used by an average of 7730 passengers daily.

== See also ==
- List of railway stations in Japan
