= Onomichi Station =

Railway station in Onomichi, Hiroshima Prefecture, Japan

Onomichi Station 尾道駅
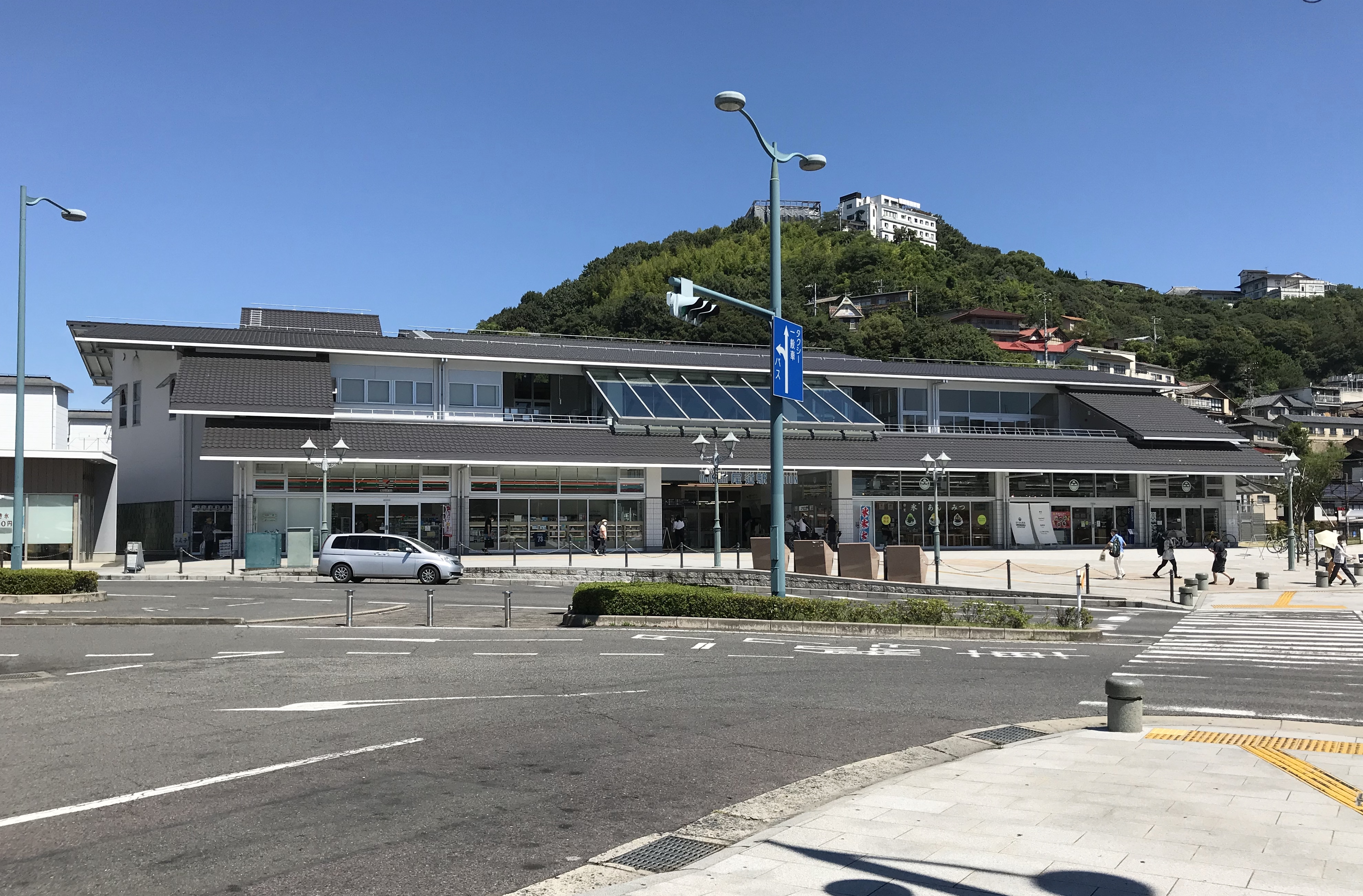
- Onomichi Station building in August 2020

General information
- Location: 1-1 Higashigoshocho, Onomichi-shi, Hiroshima-ken 722-0036; Japan
- Coordinates: 34°24′17.4″N 133°11′37.2″E
- Owner: West Japan Railway Company
- Operator: West Japan Railway Company
- Line: X San'yō Main Line
- Distance: 221.8 km (137.8 miles) from Kobe
- Platforms: 1 side + 2 island platform
- Tracks: 3
- Connections: Bus stop

Construction
- Accessible: Yes

Other information
- Status: Staffed (Midori no Madoguchi )
- Station code: JR-X18
- Website: Official website

History
- Opened: 3 November 1891

Passengers
- FY2019: 5587 daily

Services
Preceding station	JR West	Following station
Itozaki towards Mihara	San'yō Line Local	Higashi-Onomichi towards Fukuyama
Location
- Location within Hiroshima Prefecture Location within Japan

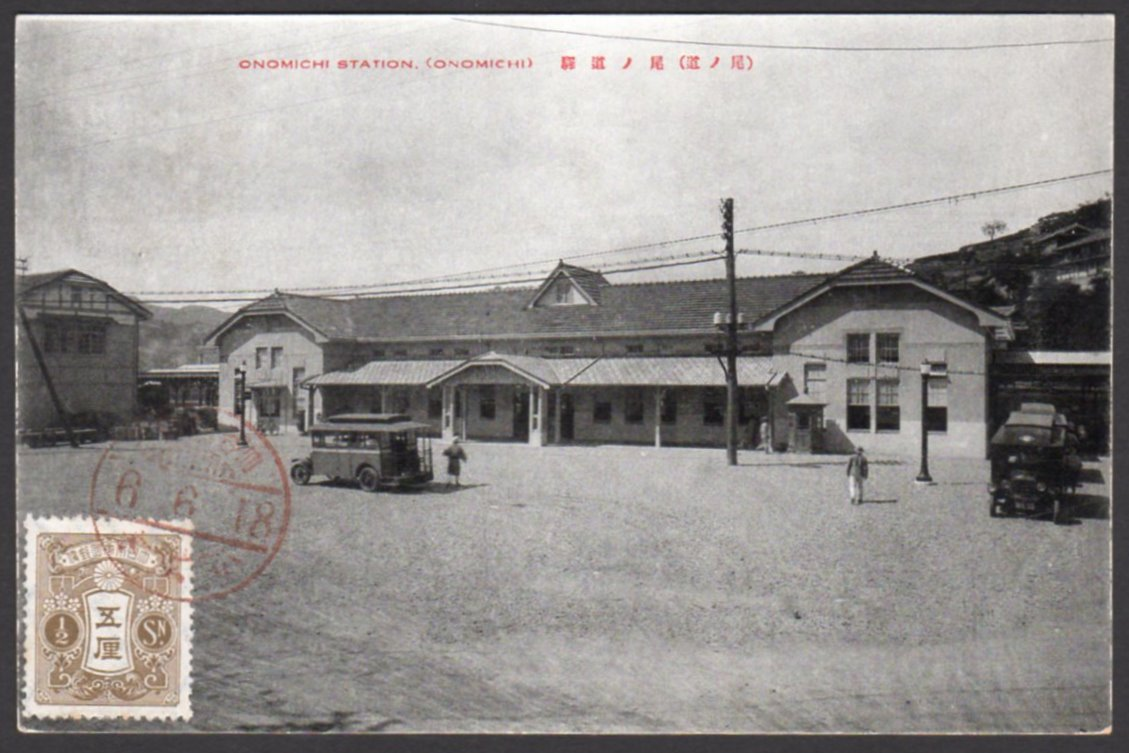
The station building, around 1918.

Onomichi Station (尾道駅, Onomichi-eki) is a passenger railway station located in the city of Onomichi, Hiroshima Prefecture, Japan. It is operated by the West Japan Railway Company (JR West).

== Lines ==
Onomichi Station is served by the JR West San'yō Main Line, and is located 221.8 kilometers from the terminus of the line at Kobe.

== Station layout ==
The station consists of one side platform and one island platform connected by an underground passage. The station has a Midori no Madoguchi staffed ticket office. etSETOra sightseeing train terminates at Onomichi Station.

=== Platforms ===
1	■ X San'yō Main Line	for Mihara and Hiroshima
2	■ X San'yō Main Line	for Fukuyama and Okayama
3	■ X San'yō Main Line	for temporary use

== History ==
Onomichi Station was opened on 3 November 1891.

== Passenger statistics ==
In fiscal 2019, the station was used by an average of 5587 passengers daily.

== Surrounding area ==
- Japan National Route 2
- Onomichi Port
- Onomichi old town

== Ferry and waterbus ==
Port for riding on Ferry is located due south Onomichi Station ※In this section, there are regular routes of waterbus.

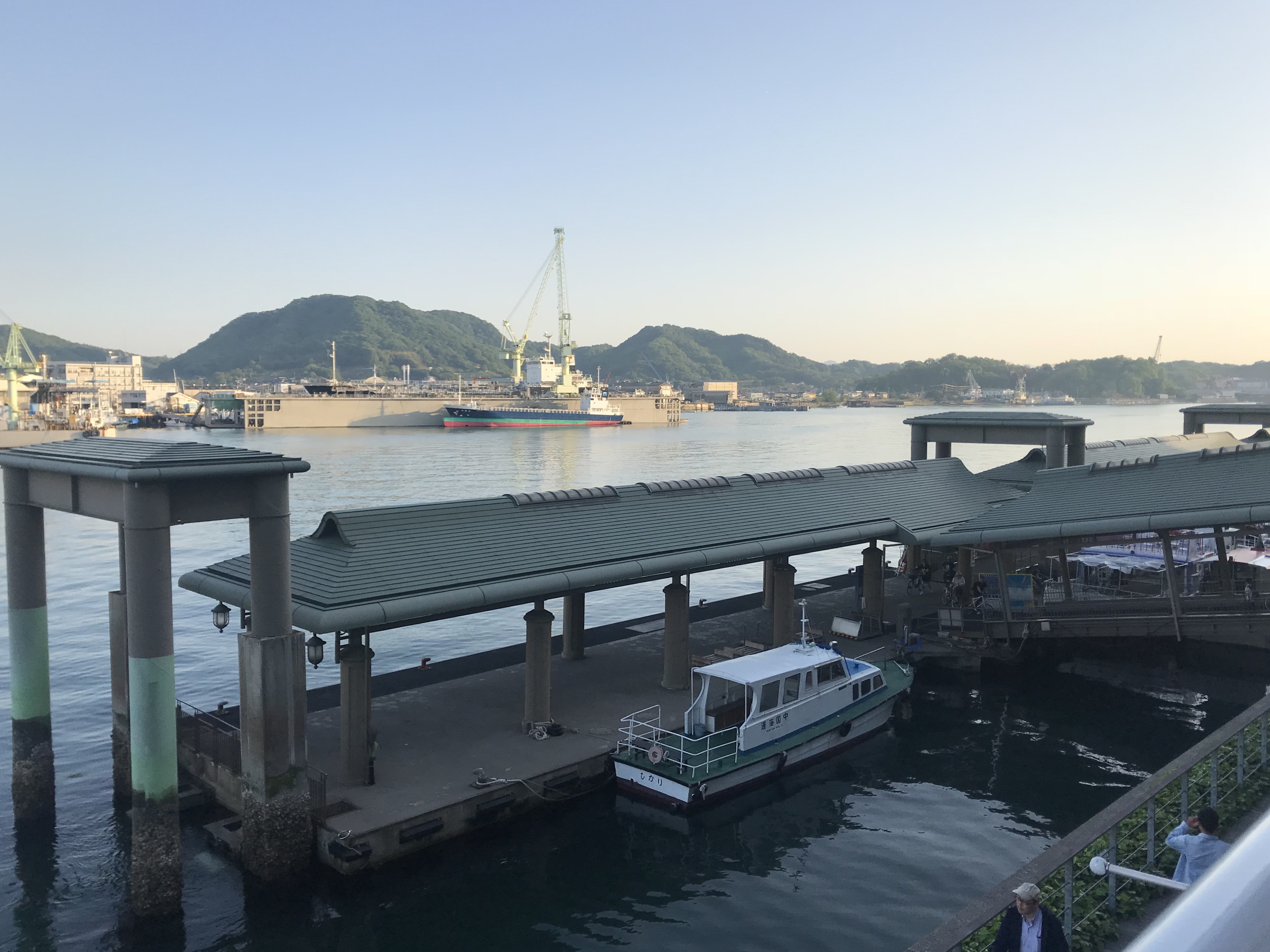
Onomichi Port

Name	Via	Destination	Company	Note
Setoda Line	Innoshima	Ikuchi-jima	Setouchi Cruise	The waterbus stops at Shigei Port in Innoshima, so you are able to change waterbuses Imabari Line (bound for Imabari Station) at Shigei Port on Innoshima
Tomo Line		Tomonoura	Setouchi Cruise	Runs only on holidays between March and November
Tsuneishi Line	Momoshima	Tsuneishi	Bingo shosen	
Mukaishima Line	Non stop	Mukaishima Island, Hiroshima	Onomichi tosen and so on	

== See also ==
- List of railway stations in Japan
