= KiHa 38 =

Diesel multiple unit train type

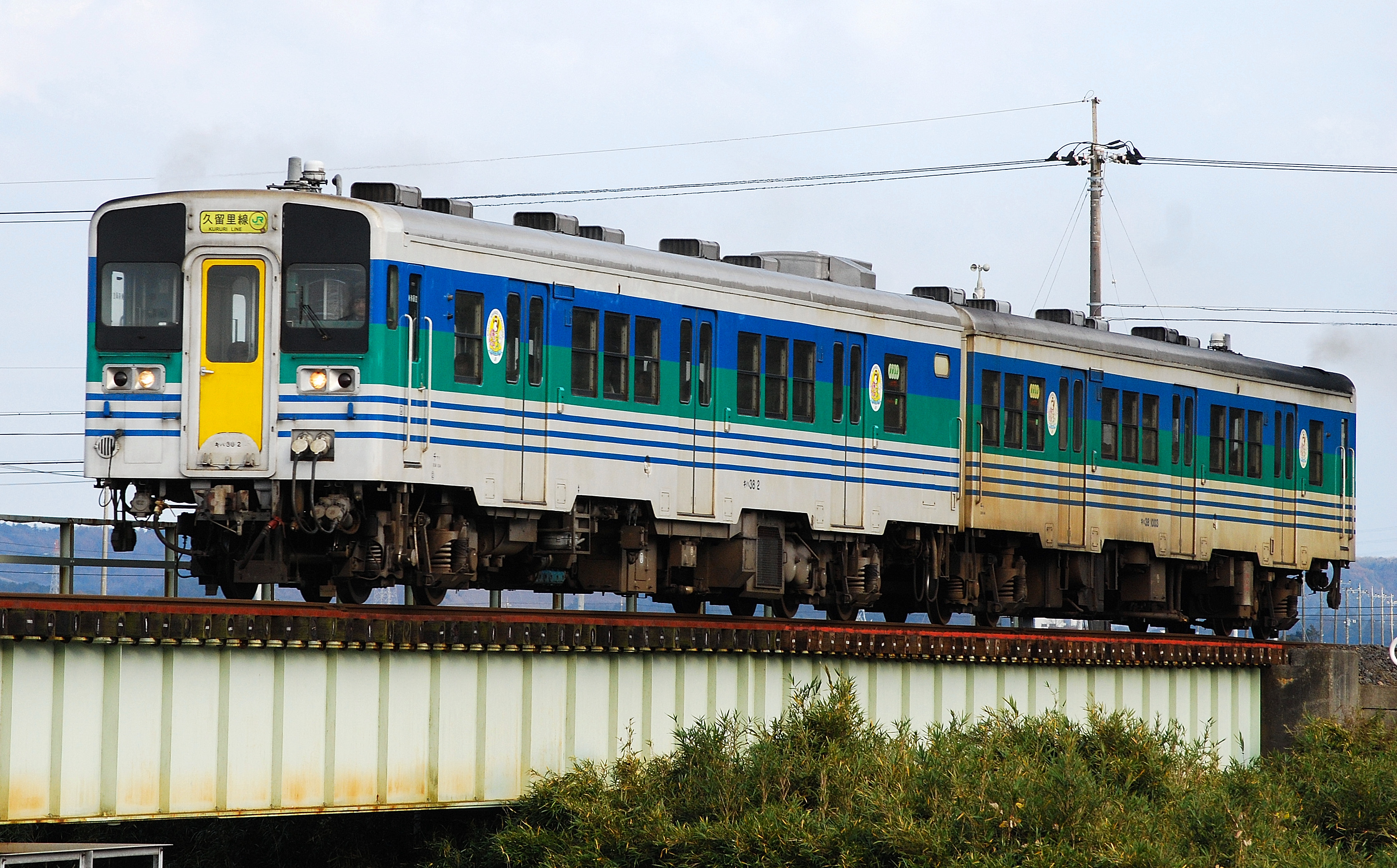
- KiHa 38-2 & KiHa 38-1003 on the Kururi Line in 2010
- In service: 1986–present (Japan); 2014–present (Myanmar)
- Manufacturer: Fuji Heavy Industries
- Replaced: KiHa 35
- Constructed: 1965–1966 (as KiHa 35)
- Entered service: 1986
- Refurbished: 1986–1987
- Number built: 7 vehicles
- Number in service: 1 vehicle (as of 2020) in Japan; 4 vehicles (as of 2020) in Myanmar
- Number preserved: 1 vehicle
- Formation: 2/3/4 cars per trainset (JNR/JR East); 1 car multiple working DMU (Mizushima Rinkai Railway); 4/5 cars per trainset (Myanmar Railways)
- Operators: JNR (1986–1987); JR East (1987–2012); Mizushima Rinkai Railway (2014–present); Myanmar Railways (2014–present)
- Depots: Kisarazu, Yangon
- Lines served: Hachiko Line, Kawagoe Line, Kururi Line, Mizushima Main Line, Yangon Circular Railway

Specifications
- Car body construction: Steel
- Car length: 20,000 mm (65 ft 7 in)
- Width: 2,929 mm (9 ft 7.3 in)
- Doors: 3 per side
- Prime mover: DMF14-HZ
- Multiple working: KiHa 30, KiHa 37
- Track gauge: 1,067 mm (3 ft 6 in)

The KiHa 38 (キハ38) is a Japanese diesel multiple unit (DMU) train type introduced by the Japanese National Railways (JNR) in 1986. These were converted from ageing KiHa 35's to meet modern standards as new rolling stock before the company was privatized in 1987. After JNR was privatized, all seven cars were transferred to JR East.

The "KiHa" designation derives from the classification system used by JNR. "Ki" indicates a diesel-powered vehicle, while "Ha" indicates an ordinary passenger car, as opposed to a green car.

No KiHa 38s remain in service since they ceased operation on the Kururi Line in December 2012, along with the last KiHa 30, which were also retired from JR East in the same year They were replaced by the new KiHa E130s on the same line.

In 2014, five cars were transferred to Myanmar Railways, and one car was transferred to Mizushima Rinkai Railway which entered service in May 2014.

== Operations ==
=== JR East ===
- Hachiko Line
- Kawagoe Line
- Kururi Line, until 2012

=== Mizushima Rinkai Railway ===
- Mizushima Main Line, since 2014

=== Myanmar Railways ===
- Yangon Circular Line, since 2014
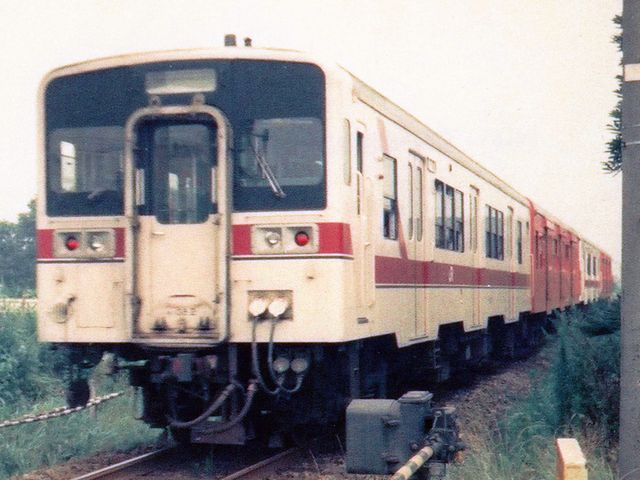
JR East KiHa 38-2 traversing the Hachiko Line between Kitafujioka and Gumma-Fujioka Station on 1988.

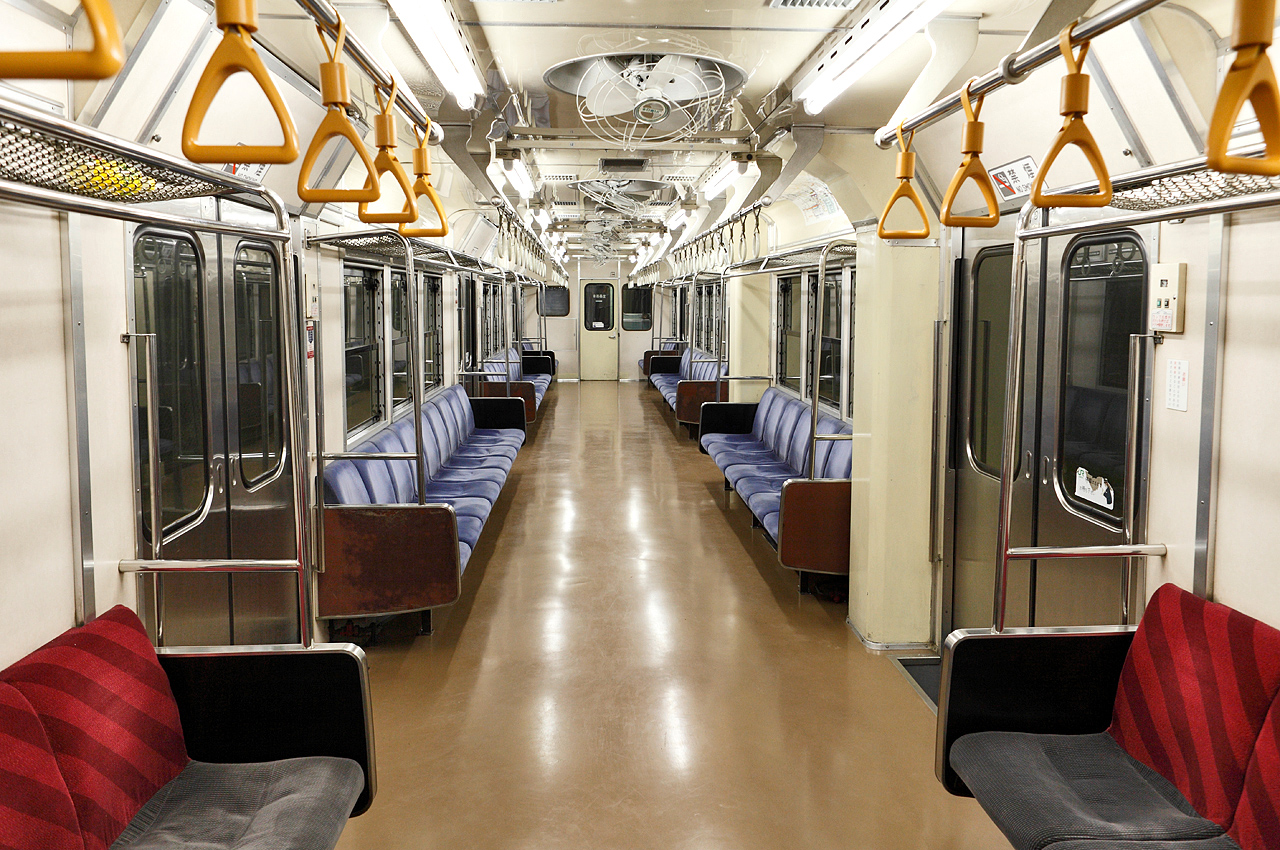
Interior

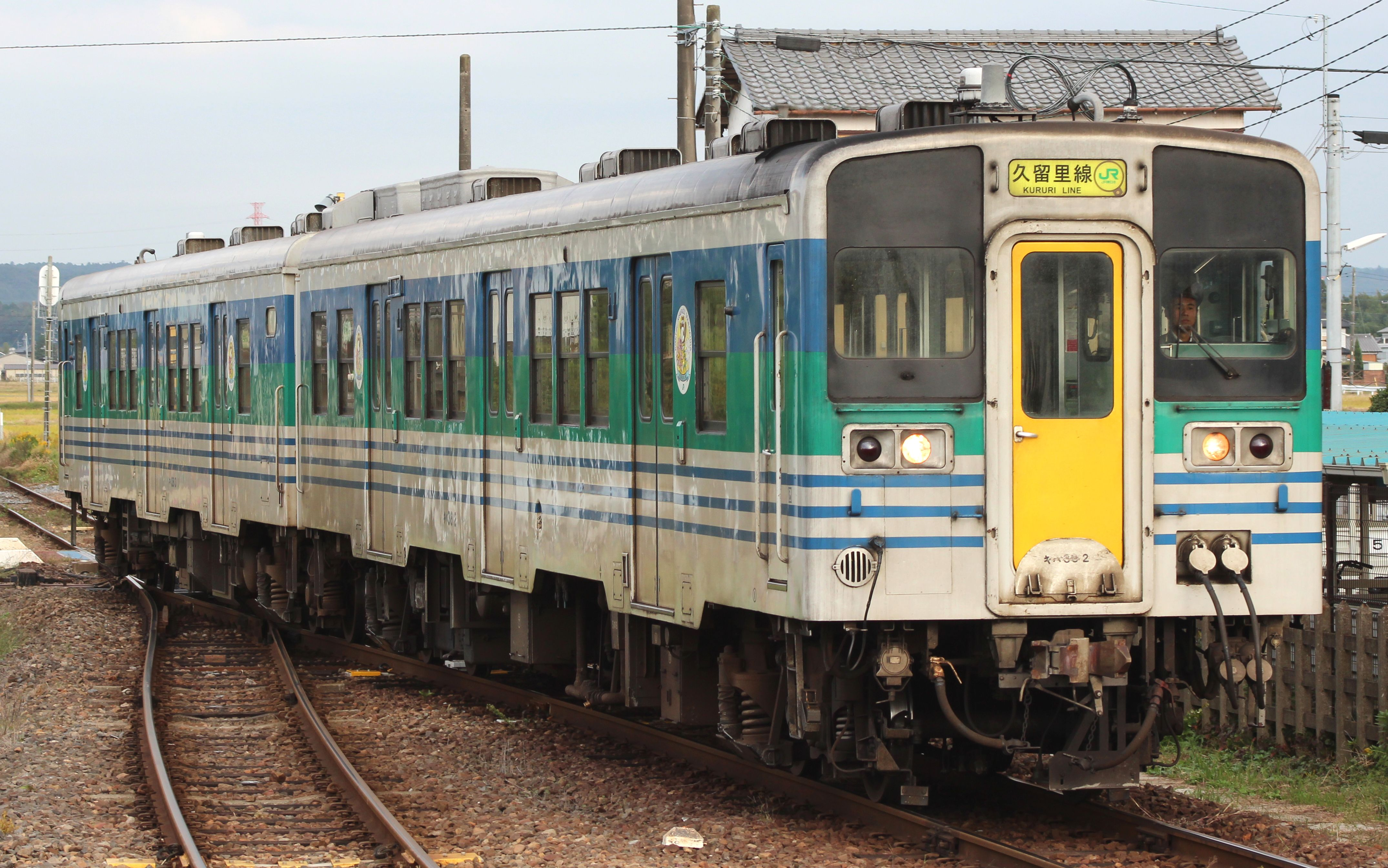
JR East KiHa 38 on the Kururi Line in 2012.

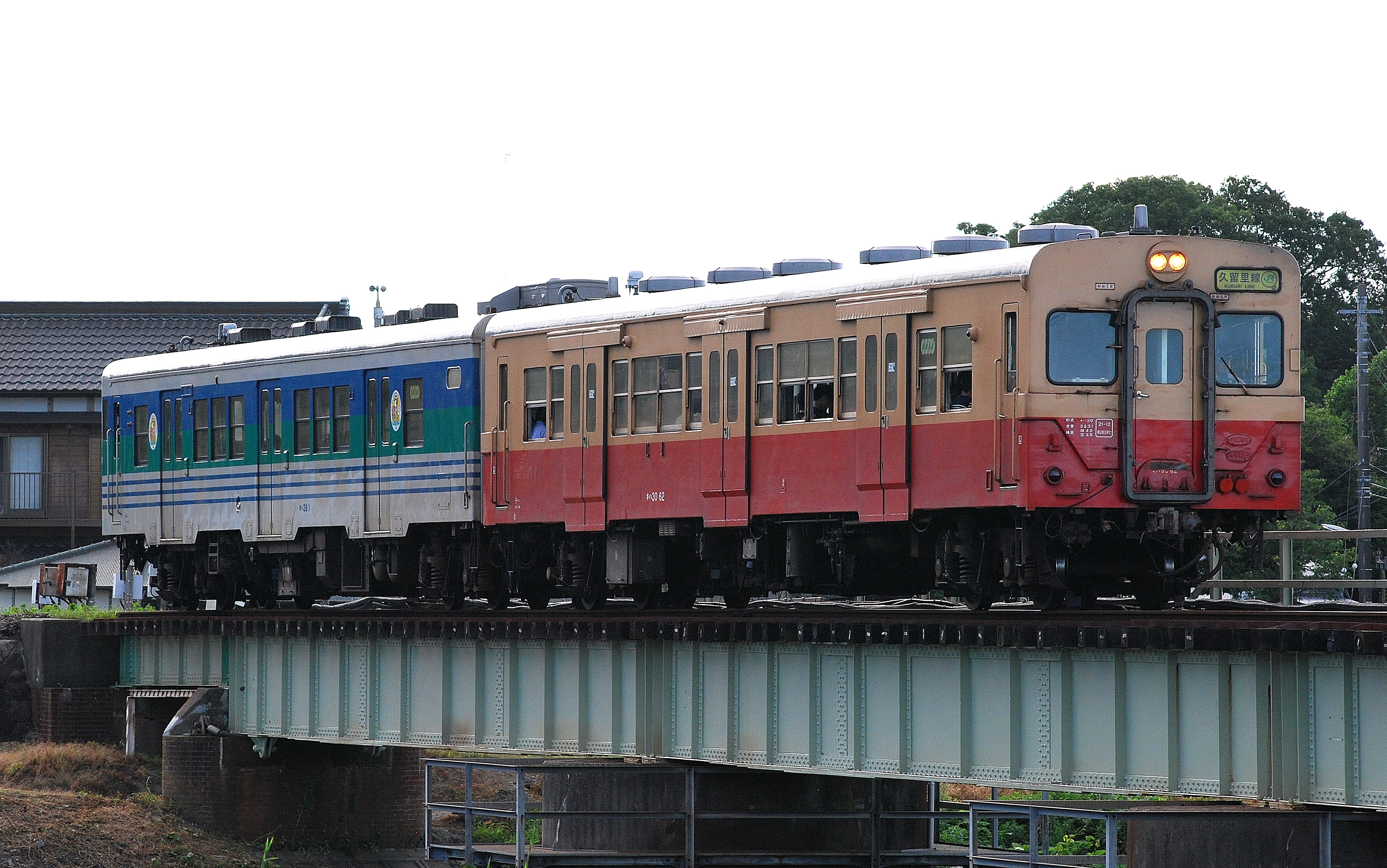
KiHa 38-1 coupled with KiHa 30–63 in classic two-toned JNR livery in July 2012.

== Withdrawal and resale ==
=== Mizushima Rinkai Railway ===
In 2014, KiHa 38 1004 was transferred to the Mizushima Rinkai Railway and was renumbered to KiHa 38 103. It entered service on 12 May 2014.

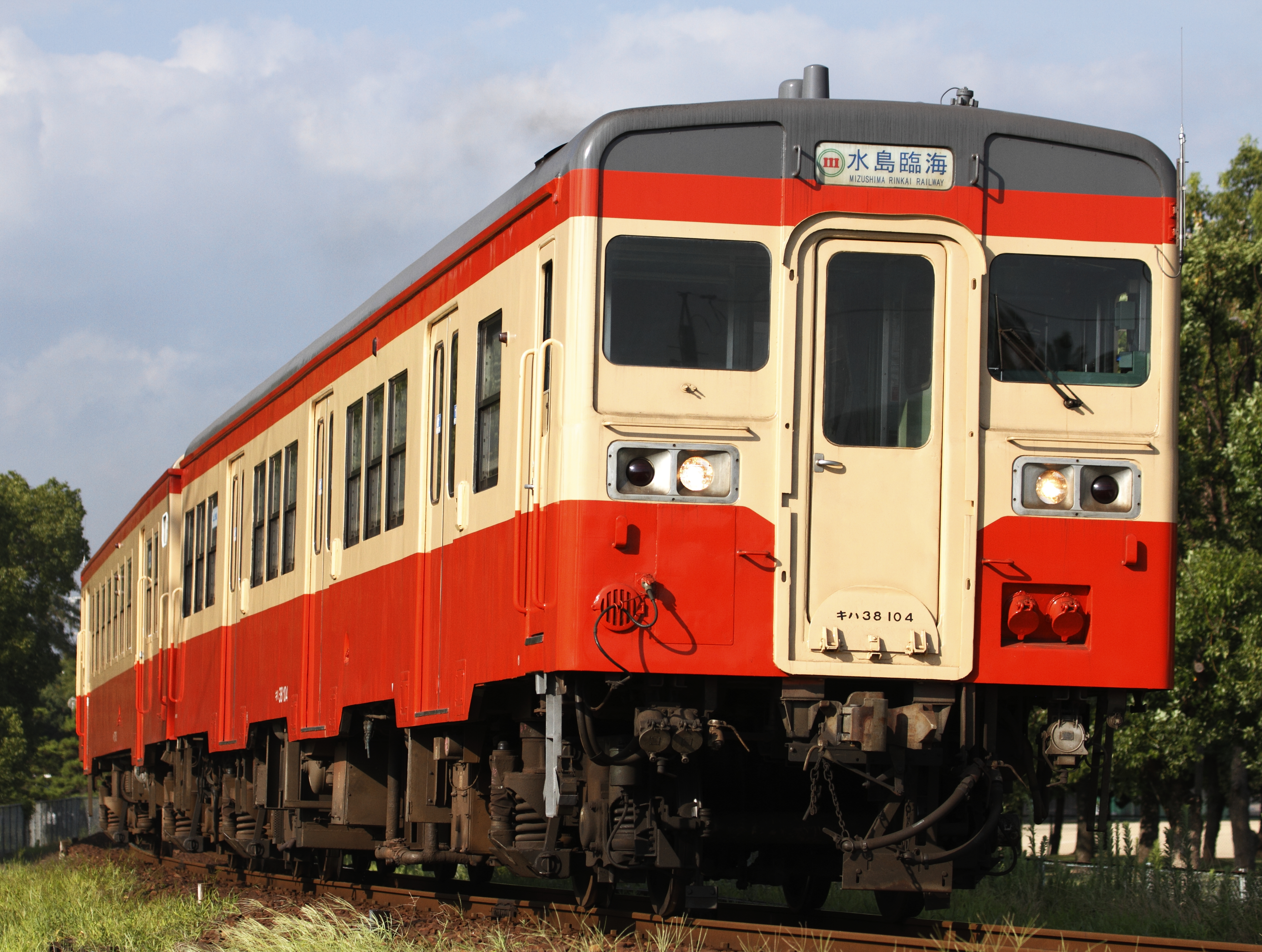
Mizushima Rinkai Railway KiHa 38-104 (formerly KiHa 38–1003) traversing the Mizushima Main Line in 2014.

=== Myanmar Railways ===
Five former KiHa 38 railcars were shipped to Myanmar to be operated by Myanmar Railways in August 2014. They entered service in 2014.

The following cars were transferred to Myanmar:

Former number	RBE body number by Myanmar Railways
KiHa 38-2	RBE 25101
KiHa 38-3	RBE 25102
KiHa 38-4	RBE 25103
KiHa 38-1001	RBE 25104
KiHa 38-1002	RBE 25105

== Preserved examples ==
- KiHa 38 1: preserved at Isumi Poppo-no-oka.
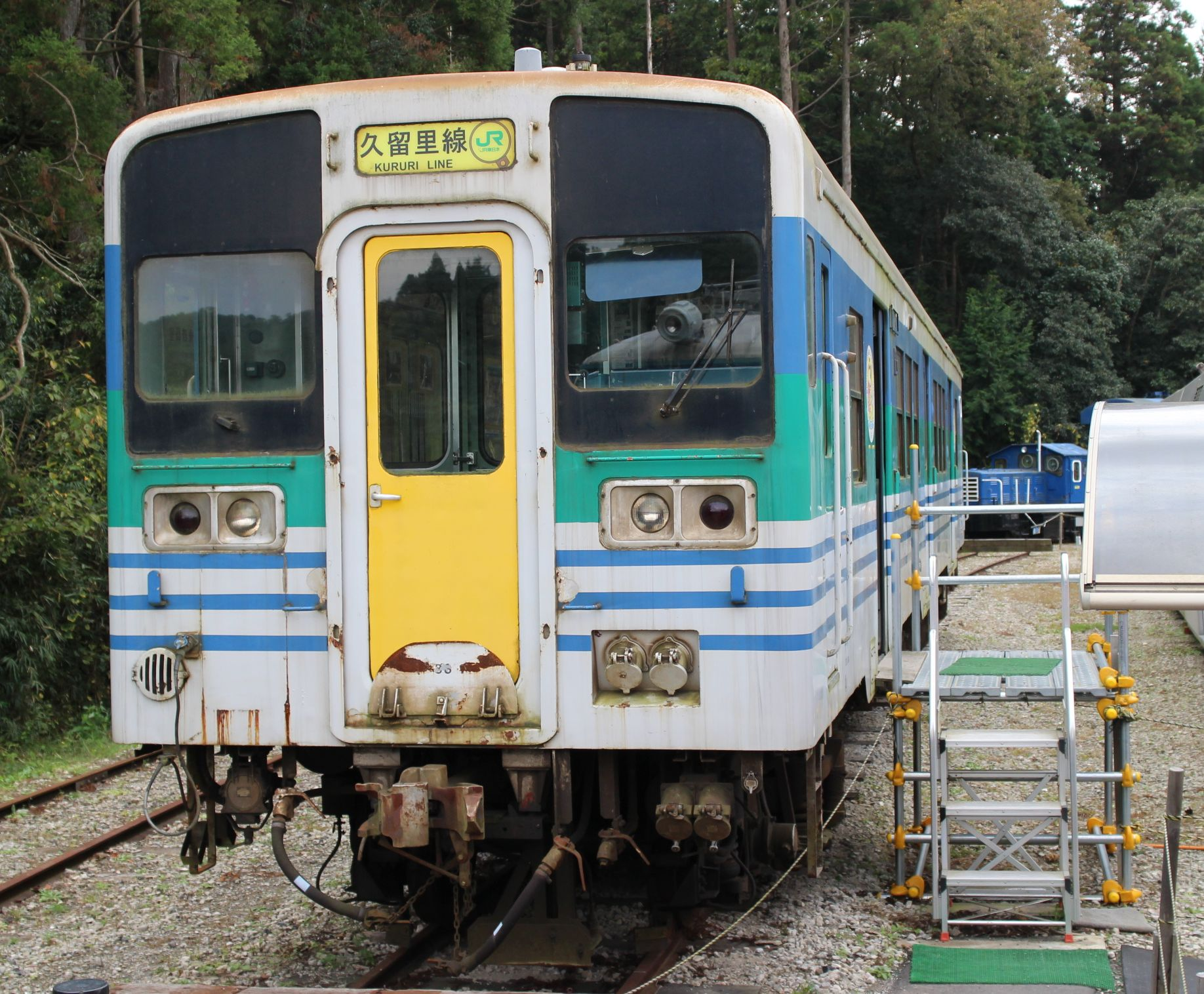
KiHa 38 1 at Poppo no oka
