= Mizushima Station =

Railway station in Kurashiki, Okayama Prefecture, Japan

Mizushima Station 水島駅
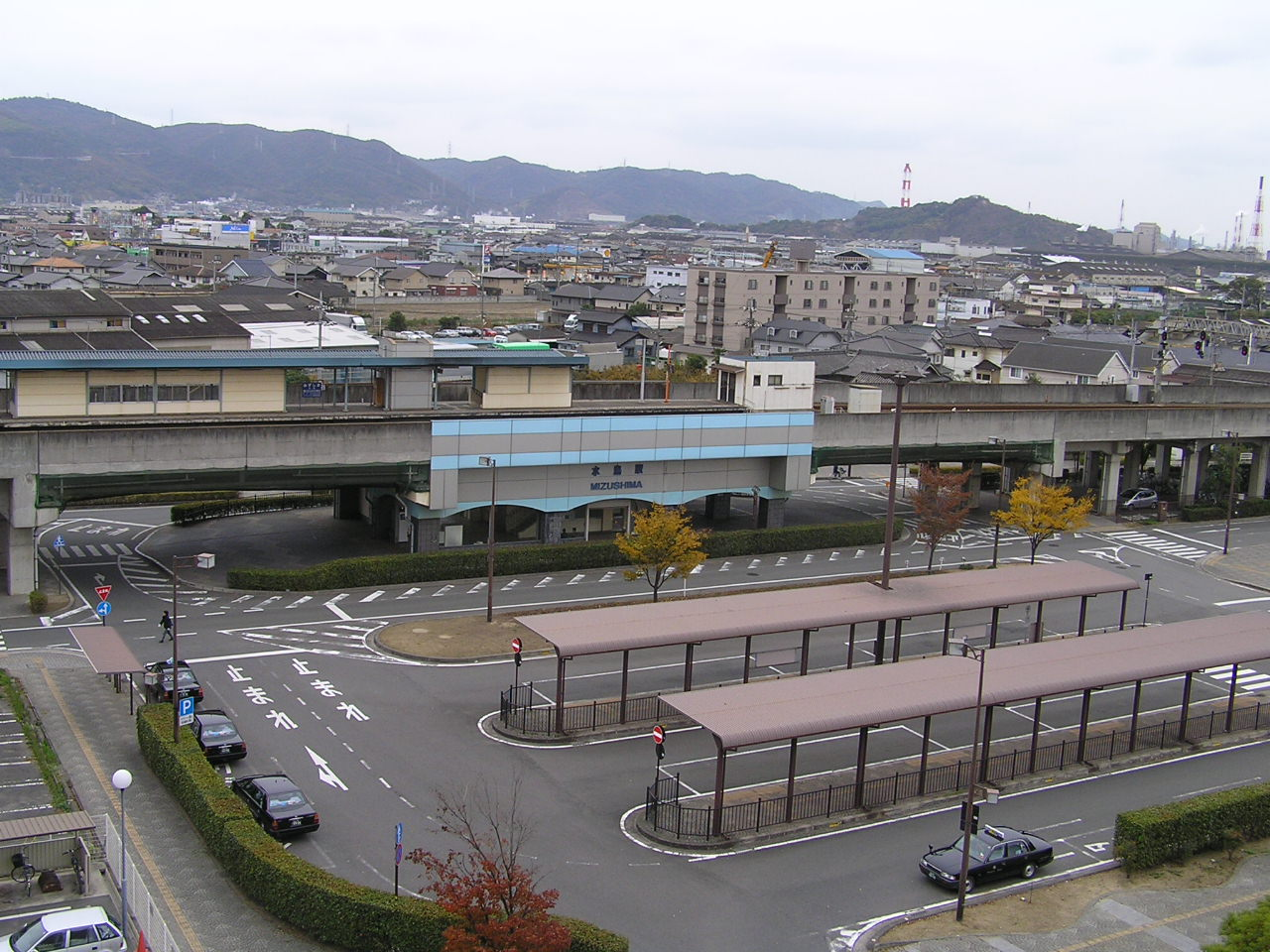
- Aerial view of the station

General information
- Location: Kurashiki, Okayama; Japan
- Coordinates: 34.5291°N 133.7413°E
- Operator: Mizushima Rinkai Railway
- Line: Mizushima Main Line
- Platforms: 1 island platform

History
- Opened: 20 August 1948
Location

Mizushima Station (水島駅, Mizushima-eki) is a train station in the city of Kurashiki, Okayama Prefecture, Japan. It is on the Mizushima Main Line, operated by the Mizushima Rinkai Railway. Currently, all services stop at this station.

== Lines ==
- Mizushima Rinkai Railway
  - Mizushima Main Line

== Adjacent stations ==
«	Service	»
Mizushima Rinkai Railway
Mizushima Main Line
Tokiwa	-	Mitsubishi-jikō-mae
