= Kurashiki Station =

Railway station in Kurashiki, Okayama prefecture, Japan

Kurashiki Station 倉敷駅
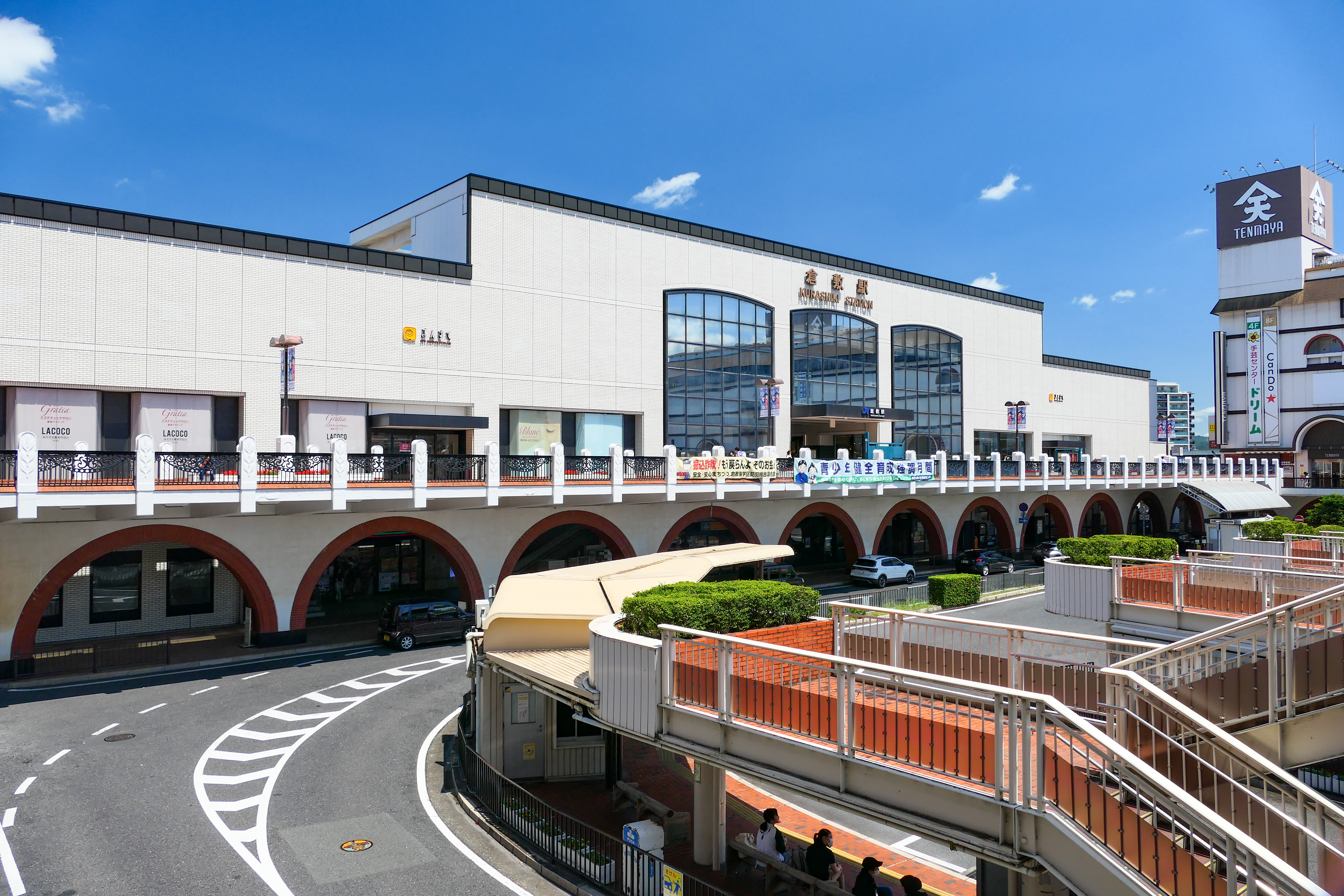
- The station's south exit in July 2023

General information
- Location: 1-1-1 Achi, Kurashiki-shi, Okayama-ken; Japan
- Coordinates: 34°36′7.45″N 133°45′56.43″E
- Owner: West Japan Railway Company
- Operator: West Japan Railway Company
- Lines: W San'yō Main Line; V Hakubi Line
- Distance: 159.3 km (99.0 miles) from Kōbe
- Platforms: 1 side + 2 island platforms
- Tracks: 5
- Connections: ■ Mizushima Rinkai Railway: Mizushima Main Line (via Kurashiki-shi)

Construction
- Structure type: At grade

Other information
- Status: Staffed (Midori no Madoguchi)
- Station code: JR-W05 (San'yō Main Line); JR-V05 (Hakubi Line)
- Website: Official website

History
- Opened: 25 April 1891

Passengers
- 2019: 19,477 daily (boarding only)
- Rank: L

Services
Preceding station	JR West	Following station
Nishiachi towards Fukuyama	San'yō Line Local	Nakashō towards Okayama
Kiyone towards Yonago	Hakubi Line Local	Nakashō towards Okayama
Kiyone towards Yonago	Hakubi Line Sunrise Izumo	Nakashō towards Okayama
Location
- Location within Okayama Prefecture Location within Japan

Kurashiki Station (倉敷駅, Kurashiki-eki) is a passenger railway station located in the city of Kurashiki, Okayama Prefecture, Japan. It is operated by West Japan Railway Company (JR West). All San'yō Main Line and Hakubi Line express and limited express trains stop at this station. The Mizushima Coastal Railway Kurashiki-shi Station is near the station.

== Overview ==
Kurashiki Station is served by the San'yō Main Line, and is located 159.3 kilometers from the terminus of the line at Kōbe. It is also the nominal terminus of the Hakubi Line, although most trains continue the additional 15.9 kilometers to terminate at Okayama.

== History ==
Kurashiki Station opened on April 25, 1891, at the same time as the opening of the section between Okayama Station and Kurashiki Station on the Sanyo Railway. The line was nationalized on December 1, 1906. With the privatization of the Japan National Railways (JNR) on April 1, 1987, the station came under the aegis of the West Japan Railway Company.

== Station layout ==
The station consists of one side platform and two island platforms, connected by an elevated station building.The stations a Midori no Madoguchi staffed ticket office. Trains coming and going to Fukuyama on the San'yō Main Line basically use Platforms 1 and 3. Platform 2 is used by outbound freight trains that stop at this station, forwarding/special trains, and Mizushima Rinkai Railway. The Mizushima Rinkai Railway can also depart from Platform 1. Platforms 4 and 5 are used by trains entering and leaving the Hakubi Line. Inbound freight trains that enter the San'yō Main Line from the Mizushima Rinkai Railway use the siding between Platforms 3 and 4.

=== Platforms ===
1	■ W San'yō Main Line	for Shin-Kurashiki and Fukuyama
2	■ W San'yō Main Line	(used for Sanyō Main Line and Mizushima Coastal Railway freight and special trains)
3	■ W San'yō Main Line	for Okayama
4	■ V Hakubi Line	for Niimi and Yonago
5	■ V Hakubi Line	for Okayama

== Passenger statistics ==
In fiscal 2019, the station was used by an average of 19,477 passengers daily.

== Surrounding area ==
=== South entrance ===
At the south entrance to Kurashiki Station is Kurashiki-shi Station, operated by Mizushima Coastal Railway as a station on the Mizushima Main Line. Chayamachi Station, which services the Uno and Honshibasan Lines (including the Seto Ōhashi Line) is accessible via a 22-minute bus ride operated by Shimotsui Electric Railway.

- Ōhara Art Museum
- Kurashiki Bikan Area
- Kurashiki Station South Entrance Toyoko Inn
- Kurashiki City Plaza East Building
- Kurashiki City Plaza West Building
  - Mizuho Bank
- Tenmaya department store
  - Japan Postal savings ATM
- Marunaka Kurashiki Station store (formerly Daiei Kurashiki)
- Kurashiki Post Office and Kurashiki Japan Post Main Office
- Kagawa Bank
- Ryobi Sightseeing Bus Company, Kurashiki Office
- Jumbo JJ Kurashiki Station Store (pachinko)
- Mizushima Taxi

=== North entrance ===
Outside the north entrance was Kurashiki Tivoli Park, a popular amusement park, closed in 2008.

- Kohnan Kurashiki Tivoli Park Store (home center)
- Kurashiki Kotobuki-chō Post Office
- Kurashiki Suishō High School
- Kurashiki Municipal Higashi Junior High School

=== Highway access ===
- Japan National Route 429 (formerly Route 2)
- Okayama Prefectural Route 24 (Kurashiki-Kiyone Route)

== See also ==
- List of railway stations in Japan
