= Nishitomii Station =

Railway station in Kurashiki, Okayama Prefecture, Japan

Nishitomii Station 西富井駅
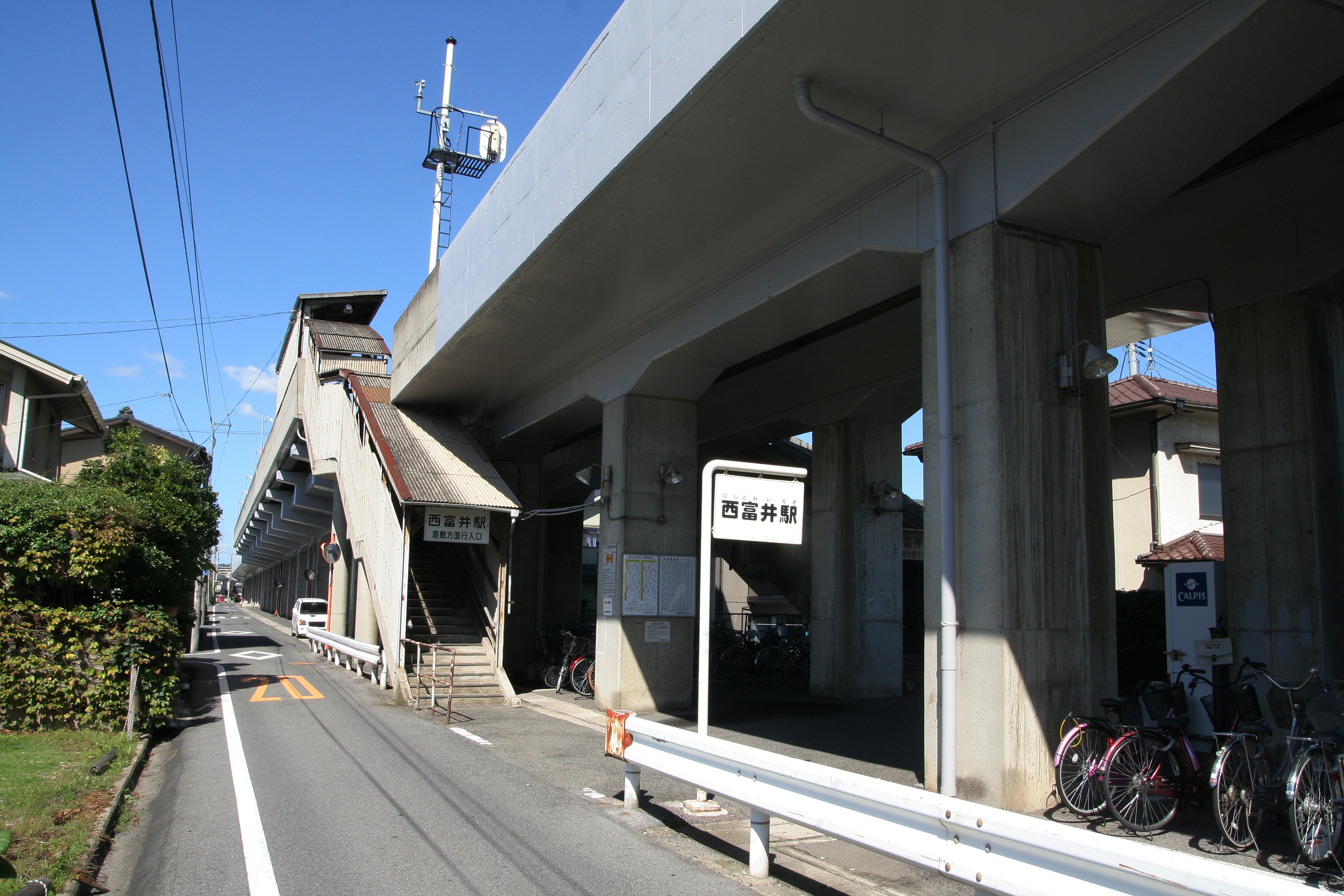
- Station entrance

General information
- Location: Kurashiki, Okayama; Japan
- Coordinates: 34.5776°N 133.7433°E
- Operator: Mizushima Rinkai Railway
- Line: Mizushima Main Line
- Platforms: 2 side platforms

History
- Opened: 15 November 1949
Location

Nishitomii Station (西富井駅, Nishitomii-eki) is a train station in the city of Kurashiki, Okayama Prefecture, Japan. It is on the Mizushima Main Line, operated by the Mizushima Rinkai Railway. Currently, all services stop at this station.

== Lines ==
- Mizushima Rinkai Railway
  - Mizushima Main Line

== Adjacent stations ==
«	Service	»
Mizushima Rinkai Railway
Mizushima Main Line
Kyūjōmae	-	Fukui
