= Kyūjōmae Station =

Kyūjōmae Station (球場前駅, literally "in front of ballpark station") may refer to the following train stations in Japan:

- Kyūjōmae Station (Kochi), in Aki, Kōchi
- Kyūjōmae Station (Okayama), in Kurashiki, Okayama
- Kiryū-Kyūjō-Mae Station, in Kiryū, Gunma
- Seibukyūjō-mae Station, in Tokorozawa, Saitama
