= Tokiwa Station (Okayama) =

Railway station in Kurashiki, Okayama Prefecture, Japan

Tokiwa Station 常盤駅
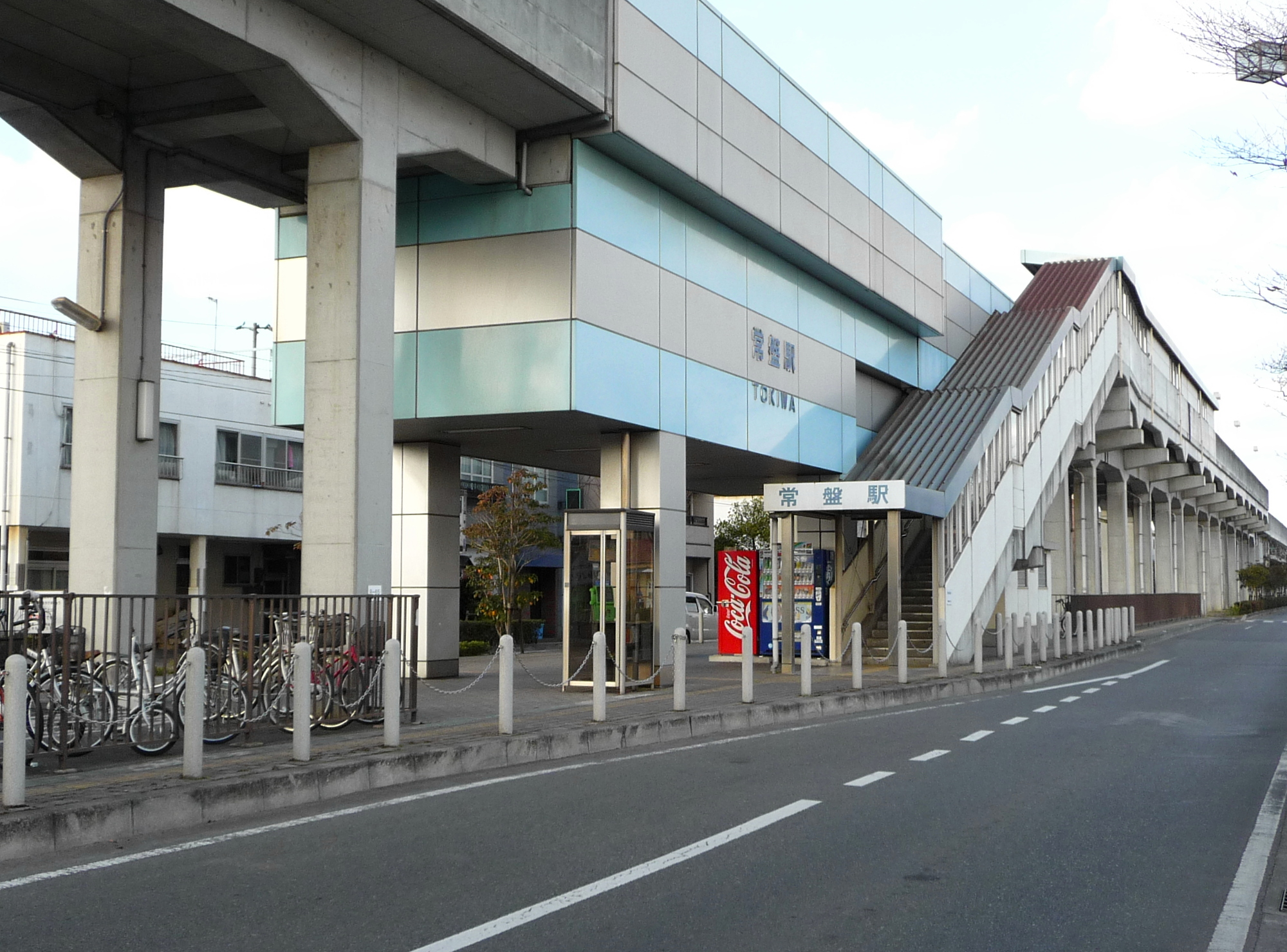
- Station entrance

General information
- Location: Kurashiki, Okayama; Japan
- Coordinates: 34.5341°N 133.7433°E
- Operator: Mizushima Rinkai Railway
- Line: Mizushima Main Line
- Platforms: 1 side platform

History
- Opened: 7 September 1992
Location

Tokiwa Station (常盤駅, Tokiwa-eki) is a train station in the city of Kurashiki, Okayama Prefecture, Japan. It is on the Mizushima Main Line, operated by the Mizushima Rinkai Railway. Currently, all services stop at this station.

== Lines ==
- Mizushima Rinkai Railway
  - Mizushima Main Line

== Adjacent stations ==
«	Service	»
Mizushima Rinkai Railway
Mizushima Main Line
Sakae	-	Mizushima
