= Kurashiki-shi Station =

Railway station in Kurashiki, Okayama Prefecture, Japan

Kurashiki-shi Station 倉敷市駅
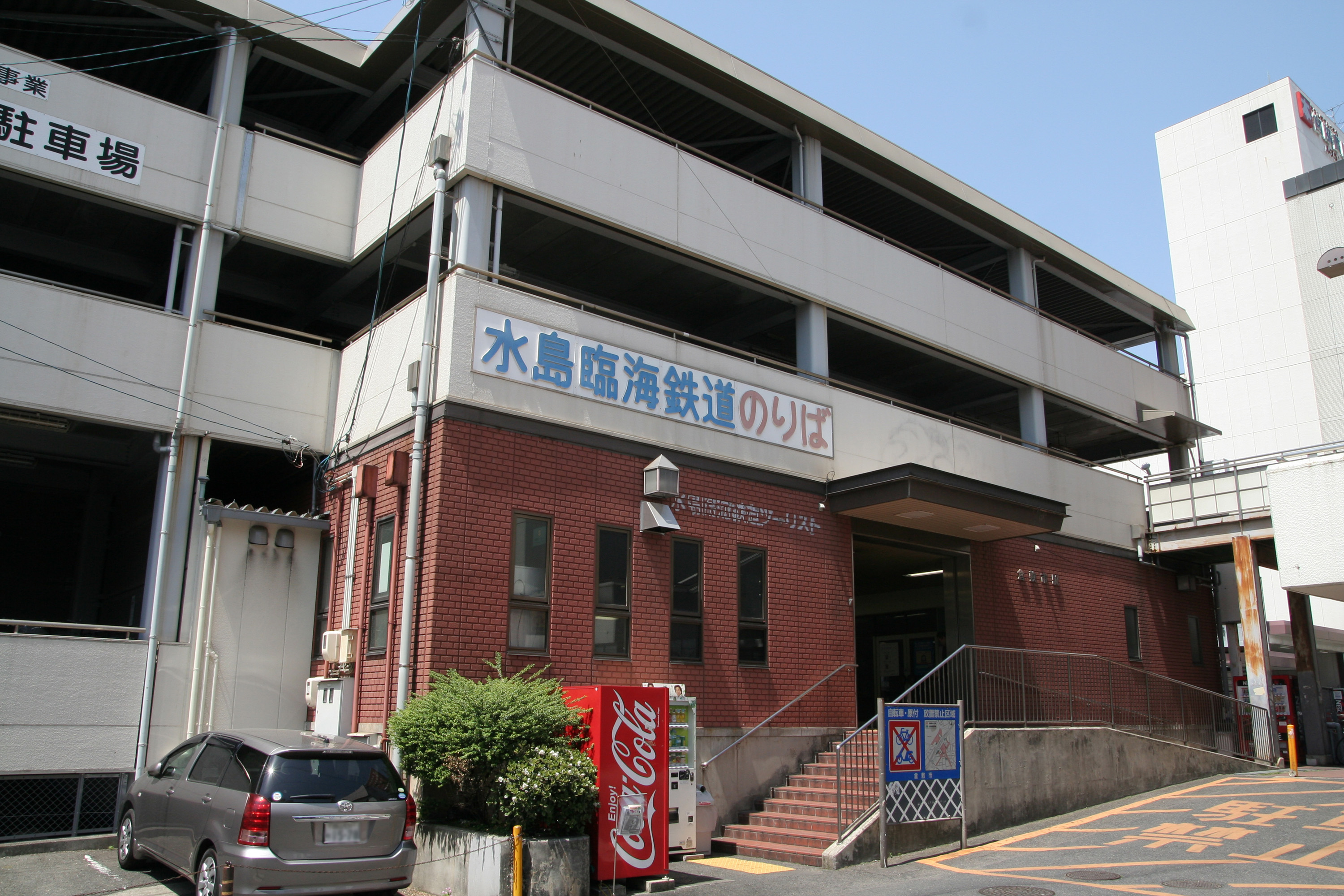
- Station entrance

General information
- Location: Kurashiki, Okayama; Japan
- Coordinates: 34.6010°N 133.7651°E
- Operator: Mizushima Rinkai Railway
- Line: Mizushima Main Line
- Platforms: 1 side platform
- Connections: Sanyō Main Line (via Kurashiki Station)

History
- Opened: 20 August 1948
Location

Kurashiki-shi Station (倉敷市駅, Kurashiki-shi-eki) is a train station in the city of Kurashiki, Okayama Prefecture, Japan. It is on the Mizushima Main Line, operated by Mizushima Rinkai Railway. This is the only staffed station on the line. The station is located close to Kurashiki Station on the Sanyō Main Line and Hakubi Line, operated by JR West. Currently, all services stop at this station.

== Lines ==
- Mizushima Rinkai Railway
  - Mizushima Main Line

== Adjacent stations ==
| « | Service | » |
Mizushima Rinkai Railway
Mizushima Main Line
| Terminus | - | Kyūjōmae |
