= KiHa 35 =

Diesel multiple unit train type

KiHa 35 series KiHa 30 KiHa 36
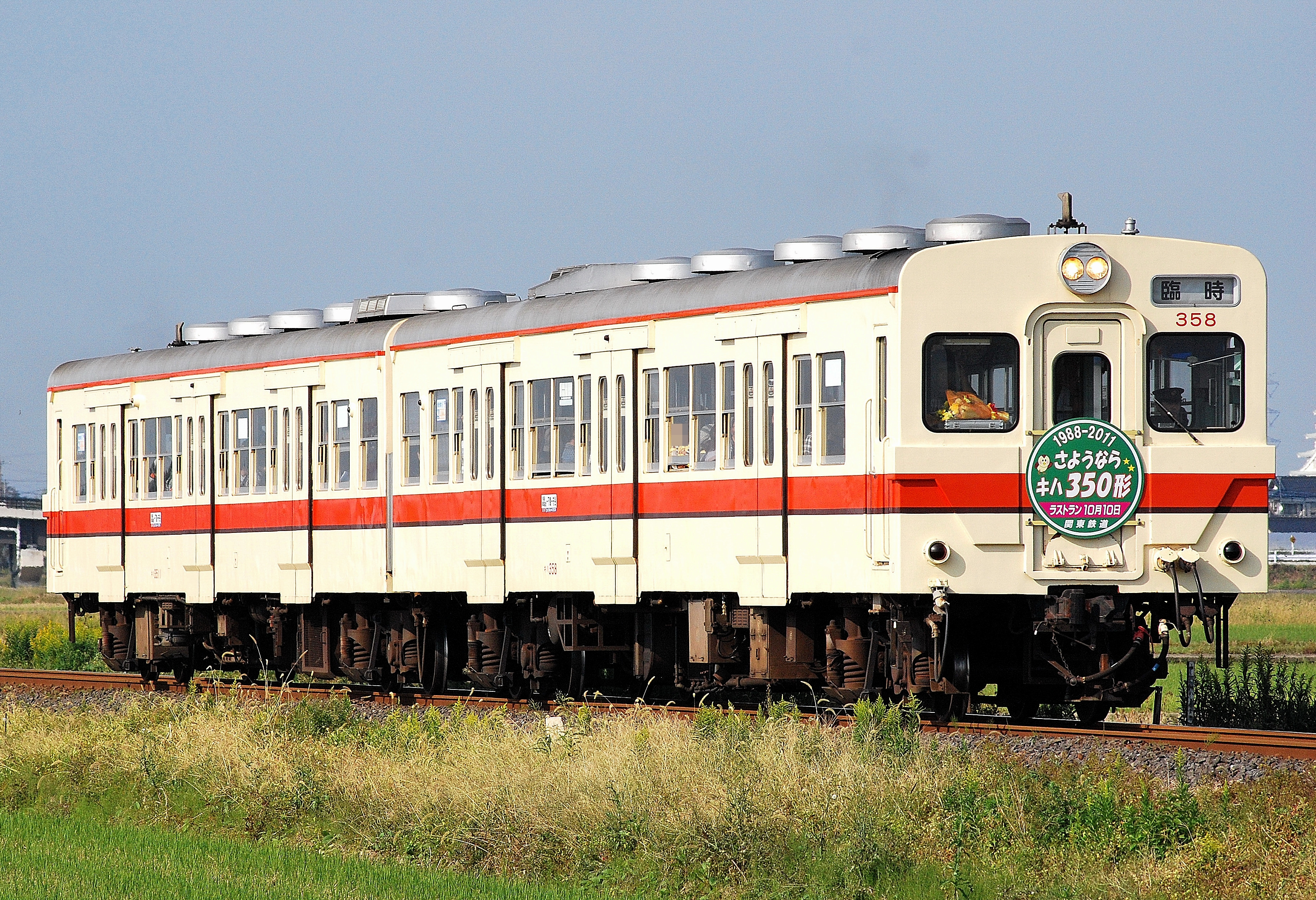
- KiHa 35 DMU
- In service: 1961–present (Japan); 2015–2023; 2026- (Philippines)
- Manufacturers: Fuji Heavy Industries, Niigata Tekkō, Nippon Sharyo, Teikoku Sharyō, and Tokyu Car Corporation
- Constructed: 1961–1966
- Entered service: 1961
- Refurbished: 1987–1992 (Kanto Railway); 1999 (Aizu Railway); 2019 (Philippine National Railways)
- Scrapped: 1983–
- Number built: 410 vehicles
- Number in service: 2 vehicles (as of 2021) in Japan; 2 vehicles (1 locomotive-hauled set) (as of April 2021) in the Philippines
- Number preserved: 11 vehicles
- Successor: 103 series, 205 series, 209 series, KiHa 40, KiHa E130 series, PNR 8000 Class, PNR 8300 Class (Bicol Commuter services)
- Formation: 1/2/3/4/5/6 cars per trainset (JNR/JR Group); 2/3 cars per trainset (Kanto Railway); 2 cars per trainset (PNR); 1 car per set (Aizu Railway & Mizushima Rinkai Railway)
- Operators: JNR (1961–1987); JR Central (1987–1989); JR East (1987–2012); JR West (1987–2001); JR Shikoku (1987–1991); JR Kyushu (1987–1991); Kanto Railway (1986–2011); Aizu Railway (1999–2009); Mizushima Rinkai Railway (2014–present); Philippine National Railways (2015–2023; 2026-)
- Depots: Kisarazu, Tutuban, Naga
- Lines served: PNR Metro South Commuter, PNR Bicol Commuter, Hachiko Line, Jōsō Line, Kawagoe Line, Kururi Line, Isumi Line, Sagami Line, Yahiko Line, Echigo Line, Sobu Main Line, Sotobo Line, Uchibo Line, Narita Line, Kashima Line, Sanin Main Line, Kisei Main Line, Kusatsu Line, Nara Line, Wakayama Line, Kansai Main Line, Sakurai Line, Katamachi Line, Wadamisaki Line, Chikuhi Line, Aizu Line, Mizushima Main Line

Specifications
- Car body construction: Steel
- Car length: 20,000 mm (65 ft 7 in)
- Width: 2,929 mm (9 ft 7.3 in)
- Doors: 3 per side
- Prime movers: DMH17 diesel engine (All units); DMF14-HZ (Kururi Line units)
- Multiple working: Various DMUs in Japan; PNR 5000 Class; PNR 2500 Class; PNR 900 Class
- Track gauge: 1,067 mm (3 ft 6 in)

The KiHa 35 series (キハ35), along with the similar KiHa 30 and KiHa 36 series, are Japanese diesel multiple unit (DMU) train types formerly operated by the Japanese National Railways (JNR) and JR Group of companies, and later operated by the private railway operators Kanto Railway and Mizushima Rinkai Railway. They were built from 1961 until 1966, and were widely used around Japan. Most units were withdrawn in 2012 with the exception of those used by private railways, which remained in service. Some were later operated by Philippine National Railways on Bicol Commuter Train since 2015, and on Metro South Commuter services since 2017.

The "KiHa" designation derives from the classification system used by JNR. "Ki" indicates a diesel-powered vehicle, while "Ha" indicates an ordinary passenger car, as opposed to a green car.

== History ==
About 410 cars were built from 1961 to 1966.

After about 50 years of service, they were replaced by newer railcars. The last units, 30 62, 30 98 and 30 100, were withdrawn from service in December 2012. The units used on Kururi Line services were withdrawn on 1 December 2012, and were replaced by KiHa E130 series units.

== Variants ==
Multiple variants of the KiHa 35 were built, like the KiHa 30 and KiHa 36. The KiHa 35 Series were built to a single cab design, and has toilets, while the KiHa 30 series were built to a double cab design without toilets.

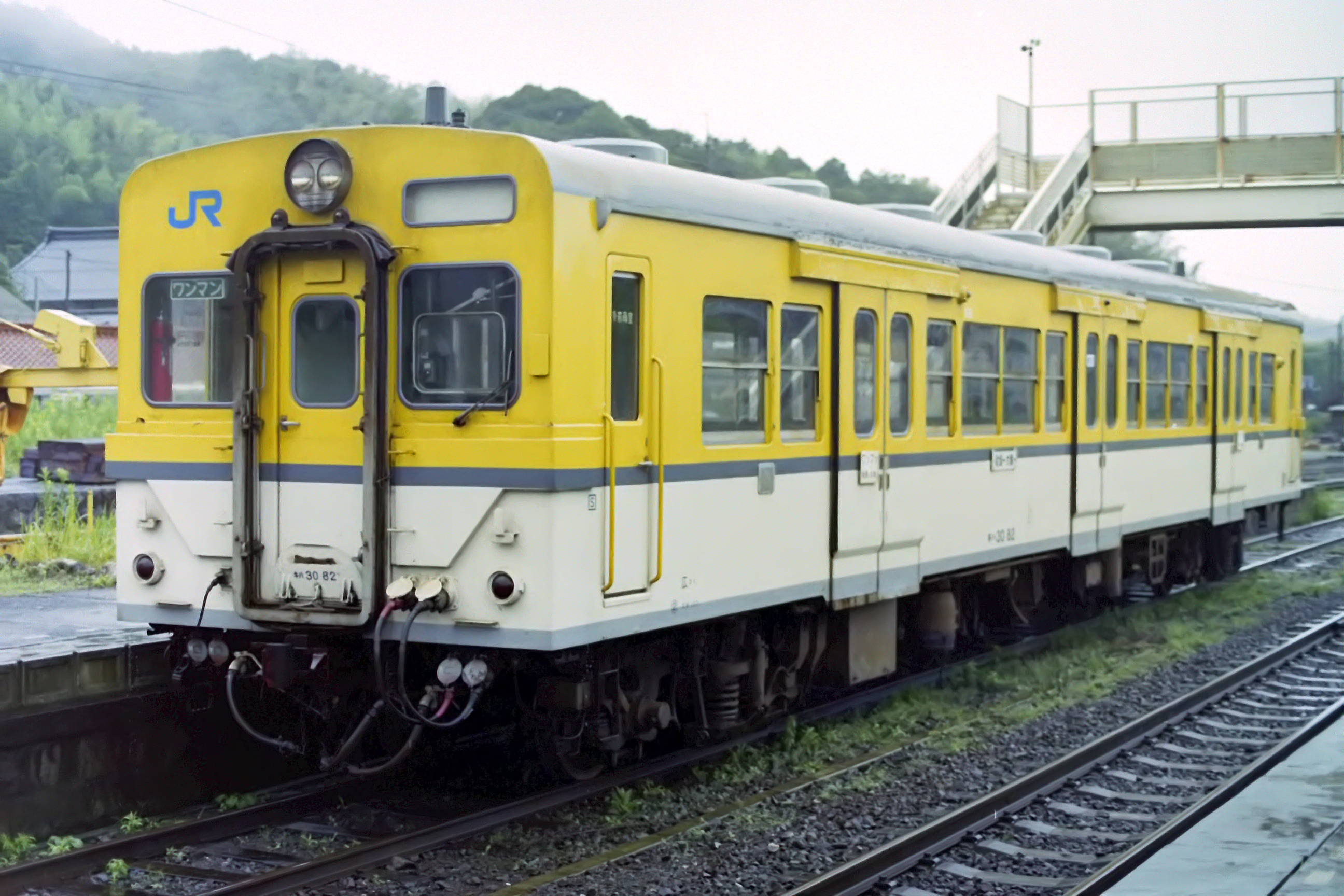
Double cab KiHa 30 in August 1993

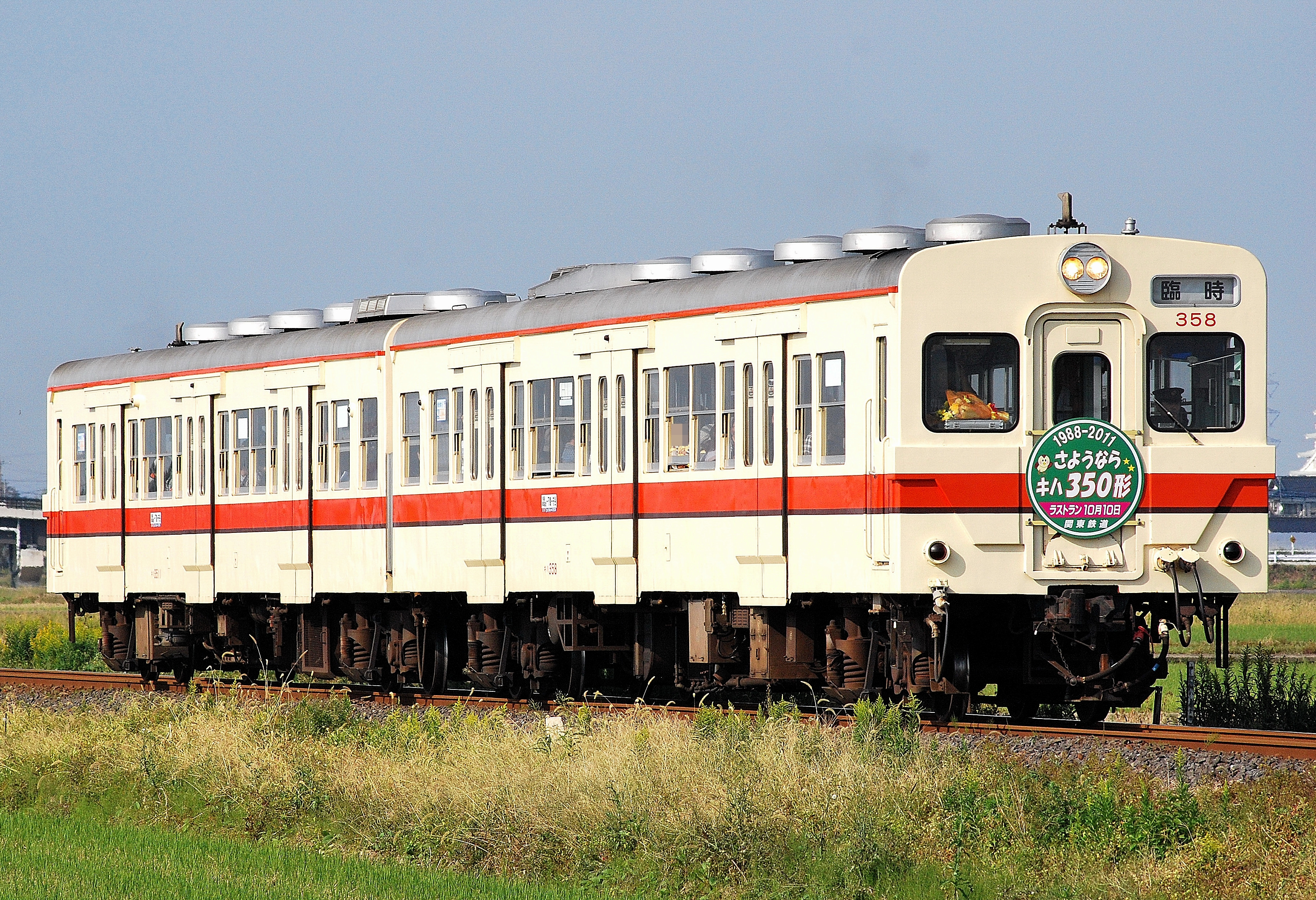
Single cab KiHa 35 in October 2011

== Specifications ==
The car bodies are made of steel, with a length of 20,000 mm (65 ft 7 in) and a width of 2,929 mm (9 ft 7.3 in). Stainless steel construction is used for some sub-variants. They are fitted with Cummins DMH17 diesel engines. The Kururi Line units used DMF14-HZ engines.

== Overseas operations ==
=== Philippine National Railways ===
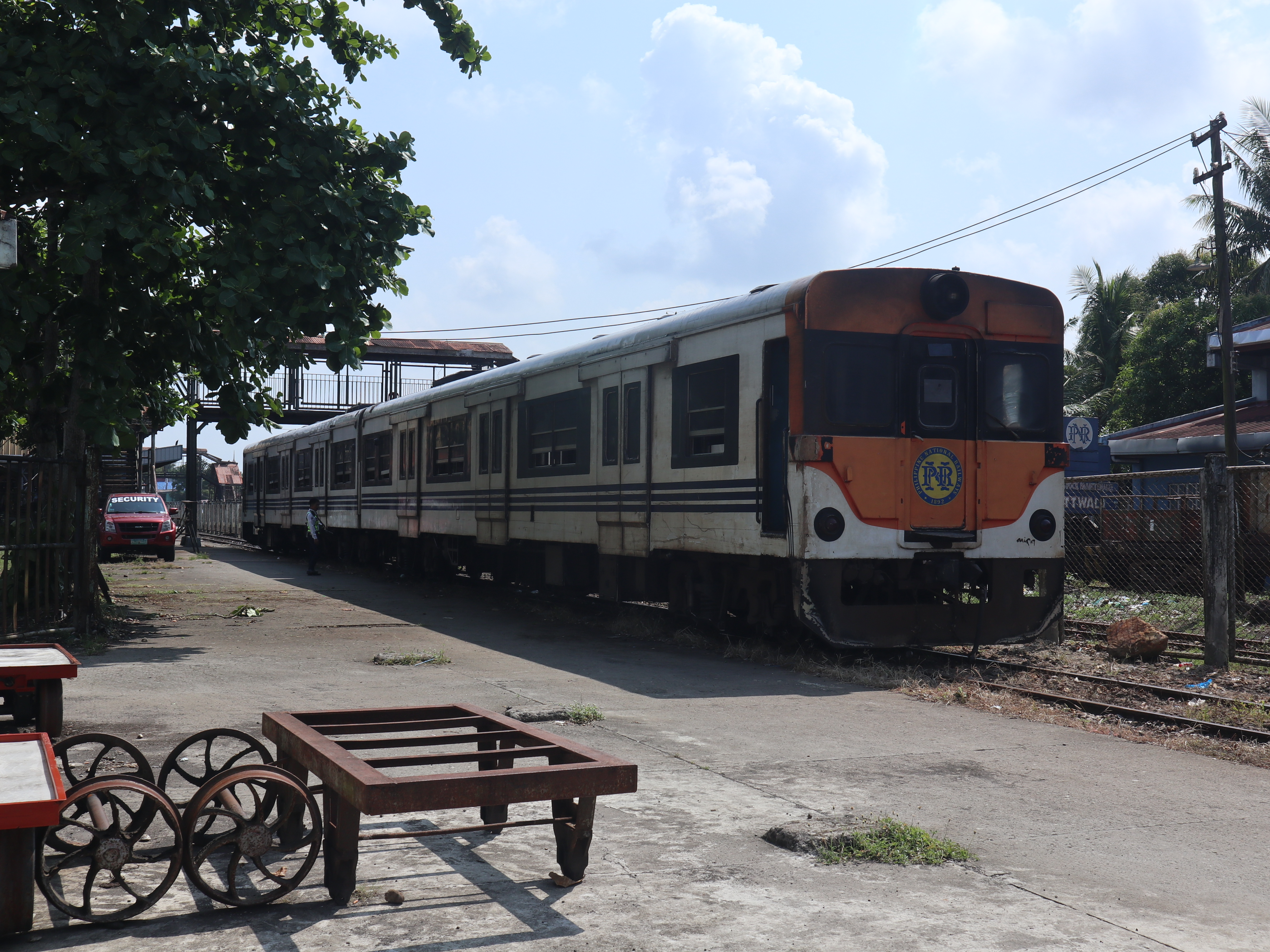
PNR KiHa 350 Set 3 in its current livery

In September 2015, six former Kantō Railway Joso Line KiHa 35 railcars were transferred to Philippine National Railways for use on Bicol Commuter and Metro Commuter services. On 14 and 16 September 2015, KiHa 350 Set 1 and Set 2 were sent to Naga to serve the Bicol Commuter Line.

They are divided into three two-car sets.

Set 1	353	354
Set 2	3511	358
Set 3	3519	3518

Sets 1 and 2 started commercial operation in September 2015 and served the Naga–Legaspi route of the Bicol Commuter Line in the Bicol Region. Because of the steep slopes on the line, they are now pulled by a locomotive.

The third formation (KiHa 3519-3518) was stored at Tayuman shed and is used as a spare car from 2015 to 2017. After two years, it entered service in September 2017, but it takes only one or two round trips a day because of its existence as a spare car.

On 1 August 2018, PNR KiHa 350 Set 3 was used for the soft opening of the Caloocan-Dela Rosa Line.

In 2019, PNR KiHa 350 Set 3 was given a new livery with the use of sticker-wrap and its windows got replaced with polycarbonate panels, removing the need of window grills. On 16 October 2020, DEL 5009 hauled KiHa 350 Set 3 on its transfer to Naga, Camarines Sur, Bicol. Set 3's purpose of transfer to Naga is to serve the Bicol Commuter Line. Set 3 has been servicing the Bicol Commuter Line ever since it went to Naga in 2020.

== Resale ==
=== Aizu Railway ===
In 1999, Aizu Railway bought a surplus diesel vehicle from JR East's KiHa 30-18 which was supposedly to be scrapped in 1996 to be modified & converted as a sightseeing diesel car and reclassified as AT-300 series rolling stock. It was remodeled inside Niigata, Japan into chartered-type train which attract tourists to generate better income due to the number of passengers decreased due to the economic slowdown in the late 1990s and the impact on the local economy was large, so it was necessary to take measures to increase transportation demand, such as Okawa Valley It was planned to introduce additional trains for the purpose of appreciating the scenery along the railroad . Due to the business situation of the Aizu Railway, it was difficult to introduce sightseeing vehicles on its own. It appeared as Japan's first self-propelled minecart. It started operation on April 29, 1999, and in the first year it was operated with AT-300 series and AT-150 series coupled together with the same paint livery so that the passengers could evacuate in case of rain, The AT-103 series was also remodeled from July 2000 as a two-car train to be coupled with the AT-103 series . However, The AT-400 series was introduced as a "Oza Toro Train" from 2003 as an observation vehicle as a "Torokko train" of the three-car train was added to Aizuwakamatsu – Aizukōgen-Ozeguchi Station was operated between July 12, 2003, where the 13th day express Abukuma been headed over to, Hobara Station – Tsukinoki Station. It was operated two round trips each day. But in 2009, it was replaced by AT-350 series and is currently stored in the Ashinomaki Onsen Station as of now.

=== Kanto Railway ===
Kanto Railway's former JR East KiHa 30/35 railcars were renumbered from 1988 to 1993.

KiHa 35 (1988–93)

Former body No.	New body No.
KiHa 36-28	KiHa 351
KiHa 35-182	KiHa 352
KiHa 35-183	KiHa 353
KiHa 35–190	KiHa 354
KiHa 36-30	KiHa 355
KiHa 36-26	KiHa 356
KiHa 36-15	KiHa 357
KiHa 35–113	KiHa 358
KiHa 35–169	KiHa 359
KiHa 35–121	KiHa 3510
KiHa 35-187	KiHa 3511
KiHa 35–148	KiHa 3512
KiHa 35-191	KiHa 3513
KiHa 35–150	KiHa 3514
KiHa 35-193	KiHa 3515
KiHa 35-188	KiHa 3516
KiHa 35–59	KiHa 3517
KiHa 36-17	KiHa 3518
KiHa 35–163	KiHa 3519
KiHa 35–134	KiHa 3520
KiHa 35–170	KiHa 3521
KiHa 35–165	KiHa 3522
KiHa 35–81	KiHa 3523

KiHa 30 (1988–89)

Former Body No.	New Body No.
KiHa 30-16	KiHa 301
KiHa 30–43	KiHa 302
KiHa 30–50	KiHa 303
KiHa 30-7	KiHa 304
KiHa 30–54	KiHa 305
KiHa 30–55	KiHa 306
KiHa 30–94	KiHa 307
KiHa 30–95	KiHa 308
KiHa 30–86	KiHa 309
KiHa 30–90	KiHa 3010
KiHa 30–56	KiHa 3011
KiHa 30-23	KiHa 3012
KiHa 30–96	KiHa 3013
KiHa 30–49	KiHa 3014
KiHa 30-29	KiHa 3015
KiHa 30-25	KiHa 3016

=== Mizushima Rinkai Railway ===
In 2014, the KiHa 30-98 and 30-100 were transferred to the Mizushima Rinkai Railway, with the KiHa 30 98 as a spares, and the 30 100 as the main unit, where they entered service from 12 May 2014. 3 KiHa 37 units, 37-101 (formerly 37-2), 37-102 (formerly 37-1), and 37-103 (formerly 37-3) and 1 KiHa 38, (formerly 38-1003), was also transferred. Their KiHa 30 and 37 units are now the last of its kind still operating.

== Preserved examples ==
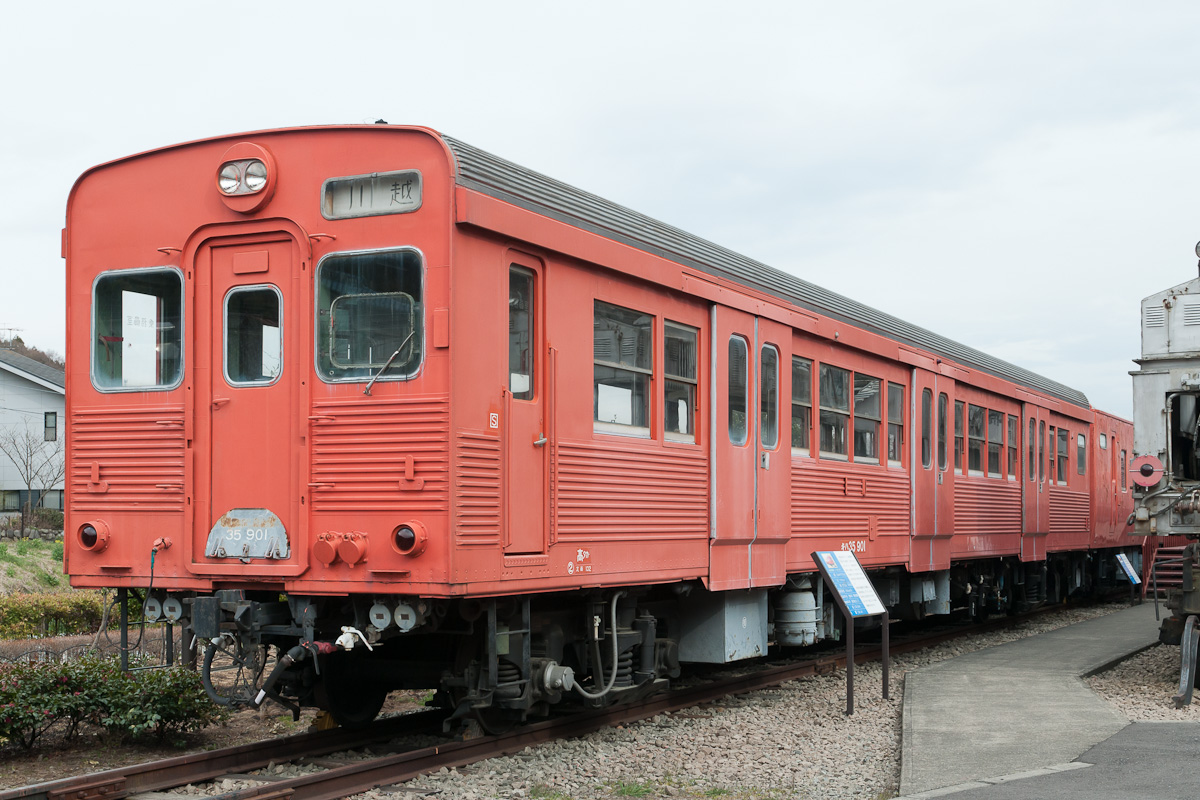
KiHa 35 preserved at the Usui Pass Railway Heritage Park in April 2011

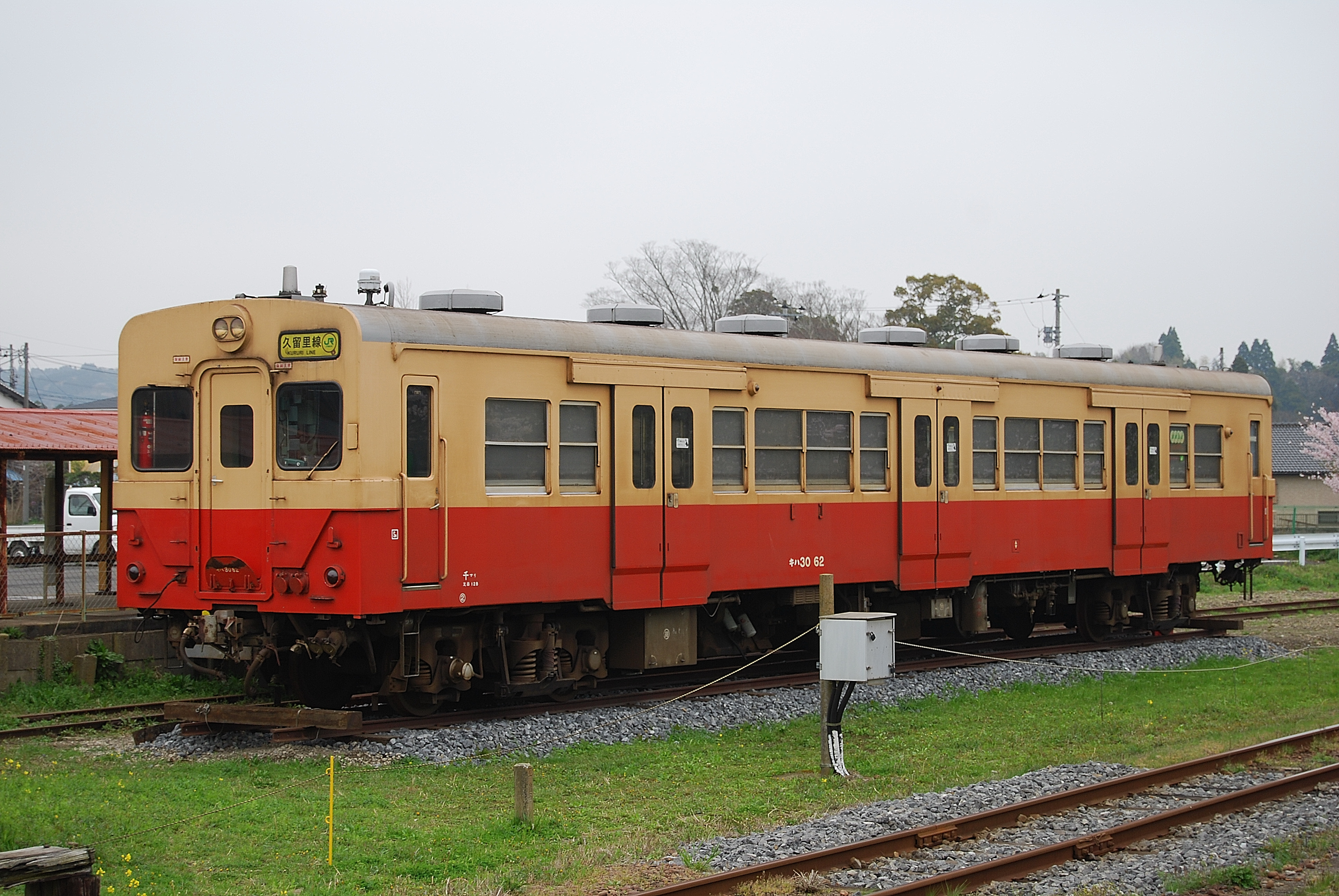
KiHa 30 preserved at Kuniyoshi Station in March 2013

Three KiHa 30 and 35 railcars are preserved in the following areas.

- KiHa 35-901: Preserved at the Usui Pass Railway Heritage Park.
- KiHa 35–70: Preserved at Nikko-shi, Tochigi Prefecture, Japan.
- KiHa 30–62: Preserved at the Isumi Railway Kuniyoshi Station in Chiba Prefecture, Japan.

== Gallery ==
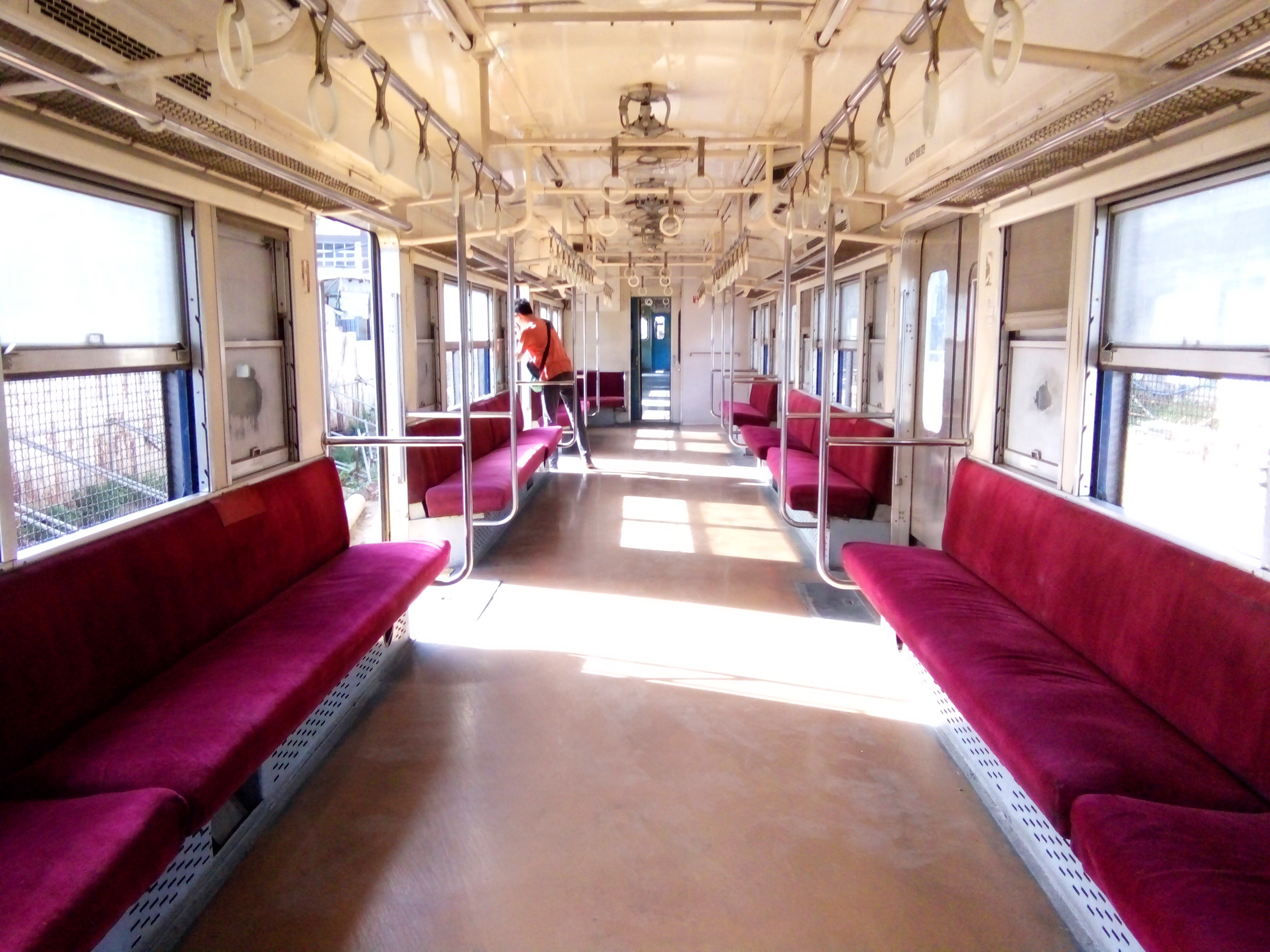
Interior

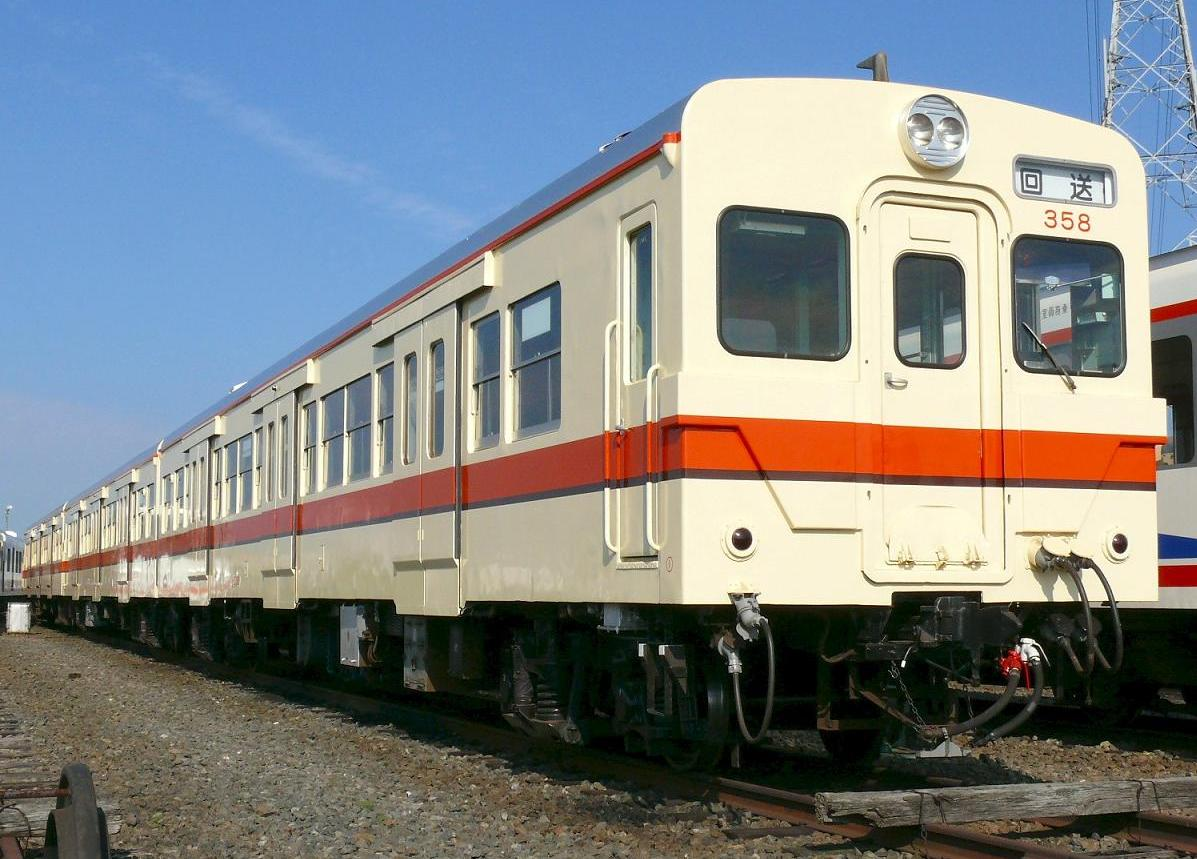
Kanto Railway KiHa 35 (3511-358) at Mitsukaido Depot in November 2007

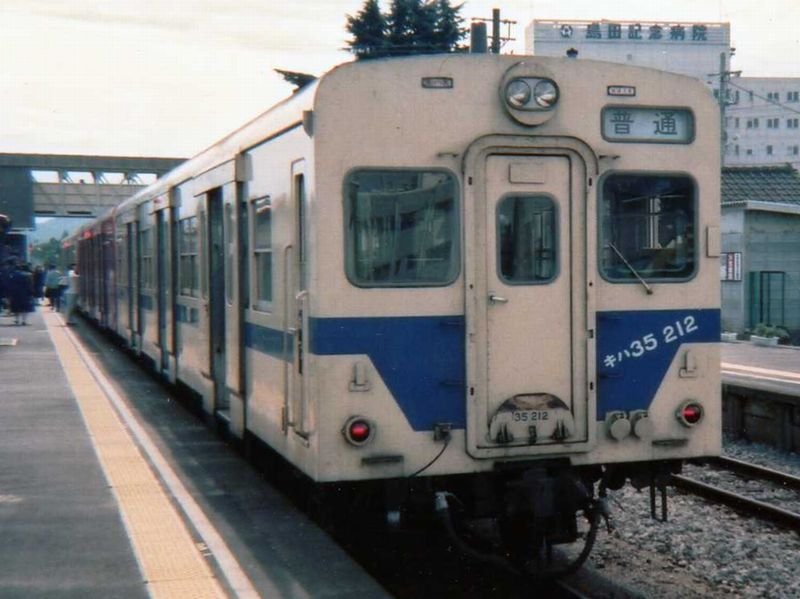
KiHa 35-212 at Gumma-Fujioka Station in 1991

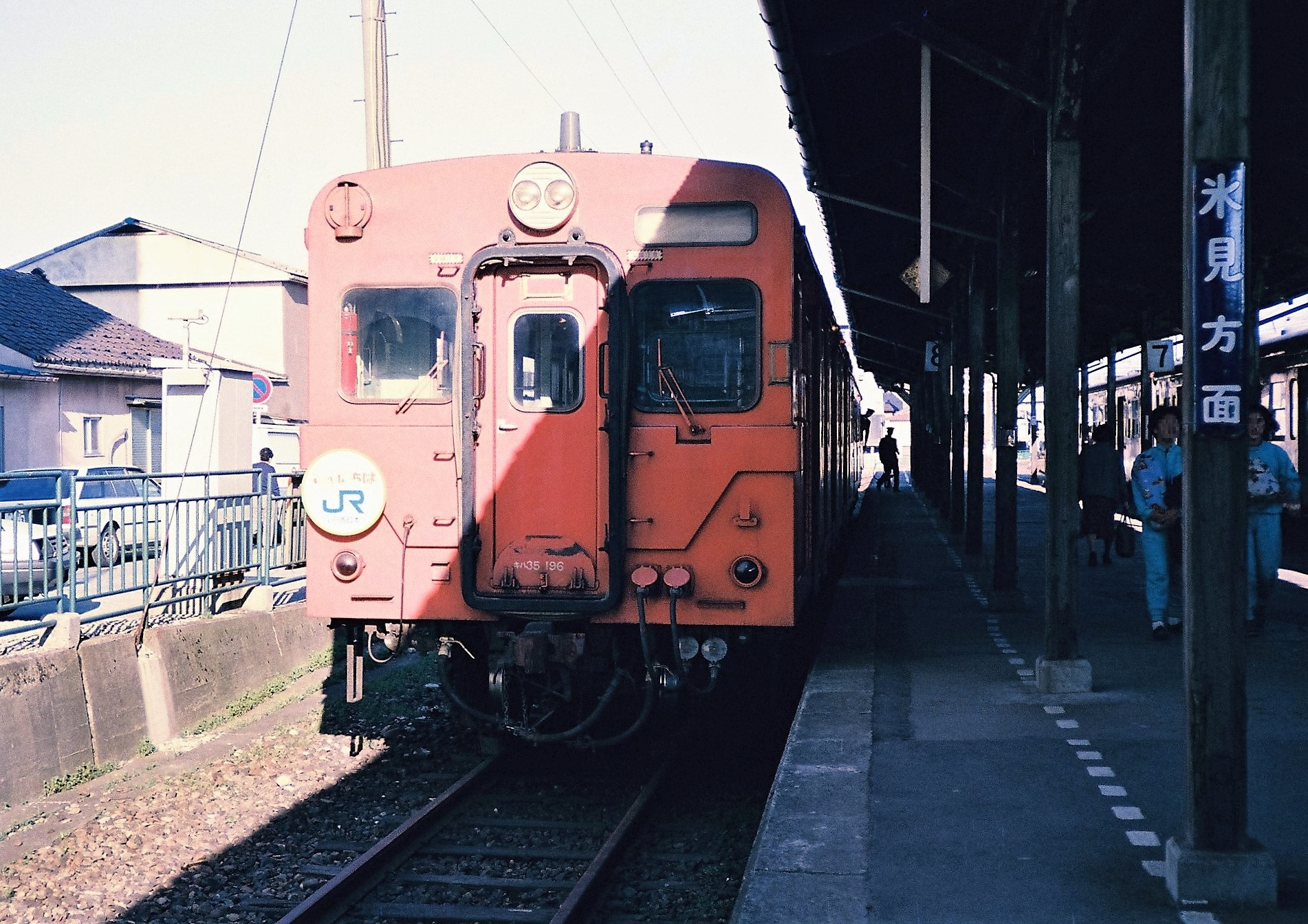
KiHa 35-196 at Takaoka Station in April 1987

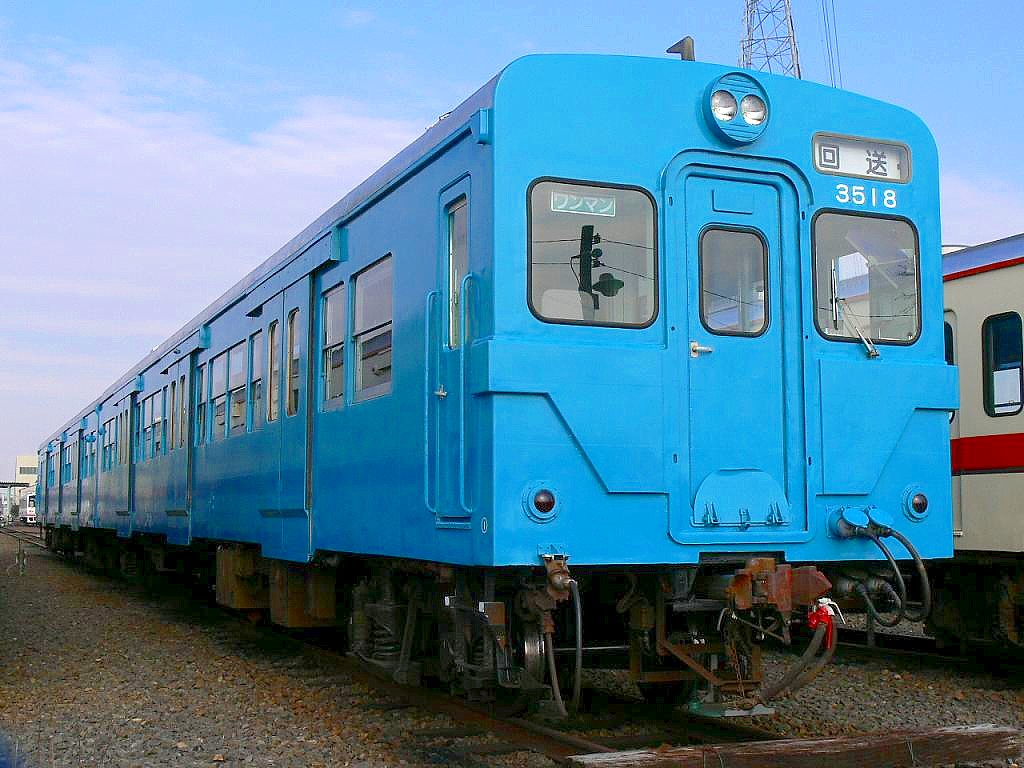
Kanto Railway KiHa 35 (3518-3519) at Mitsukaido Depot in November 2007
