= Mitsubishi-jikō-mae Station =

Railway station in Kurashiki, Okayama Prefecture, Japan

Mitsubishi-jikō-mae Station 三菱自工前駅
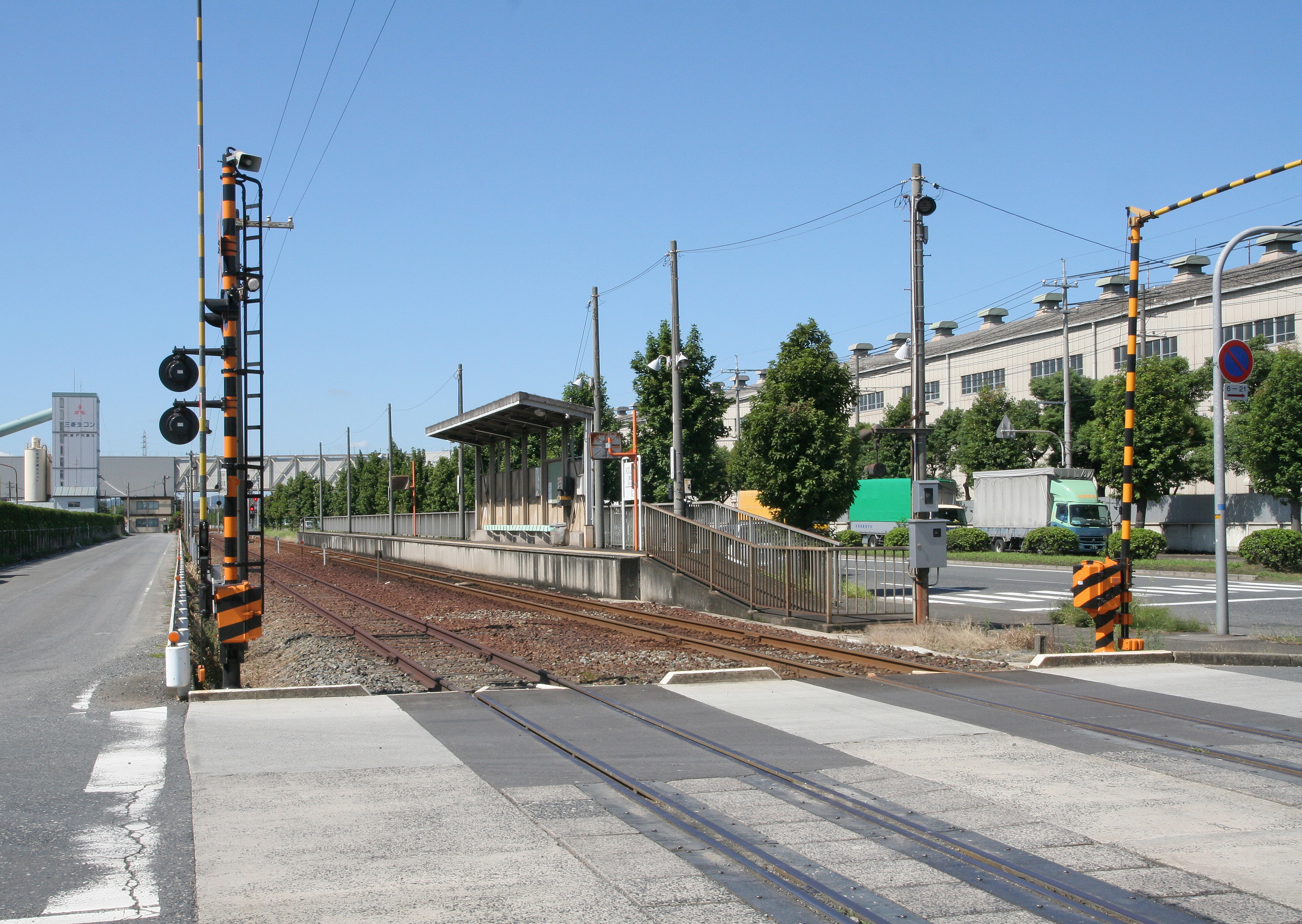
- Station platform

General information
- Location: Kurashiki, Okayama; Japan
- Coordinates: 34.5229°N 133.7330°E
- Operator: Mizushima Rinkai Railway
- Line: Mizushima Main Line
- Platforms: 1 side platform

History
- Opened: 17 September 1972
Location

Mitsubishi-jikō-mae Station (三菱自工前駅, Mitsubishi-jikō-mae-eki) is a train station in the city of Kurashiki, Okayama Prefecture, Japan. It is the southern terminus of the Mizushima Main Line, operated by the Mizushima Rinkai Railway. Currently, only a few services during rush hour stop at this station.

== Lines ==
- Mizushima Rinkai Railway
  - Mizushima Main Line

== Adjacent stations ==
«	Service	»
Mizushima Rinkai Railway
Mizushima Main Line
Mizushima	-	Terminus
