= Mizushima Main Line =

Railway line in Okayama Prefecture, Japan

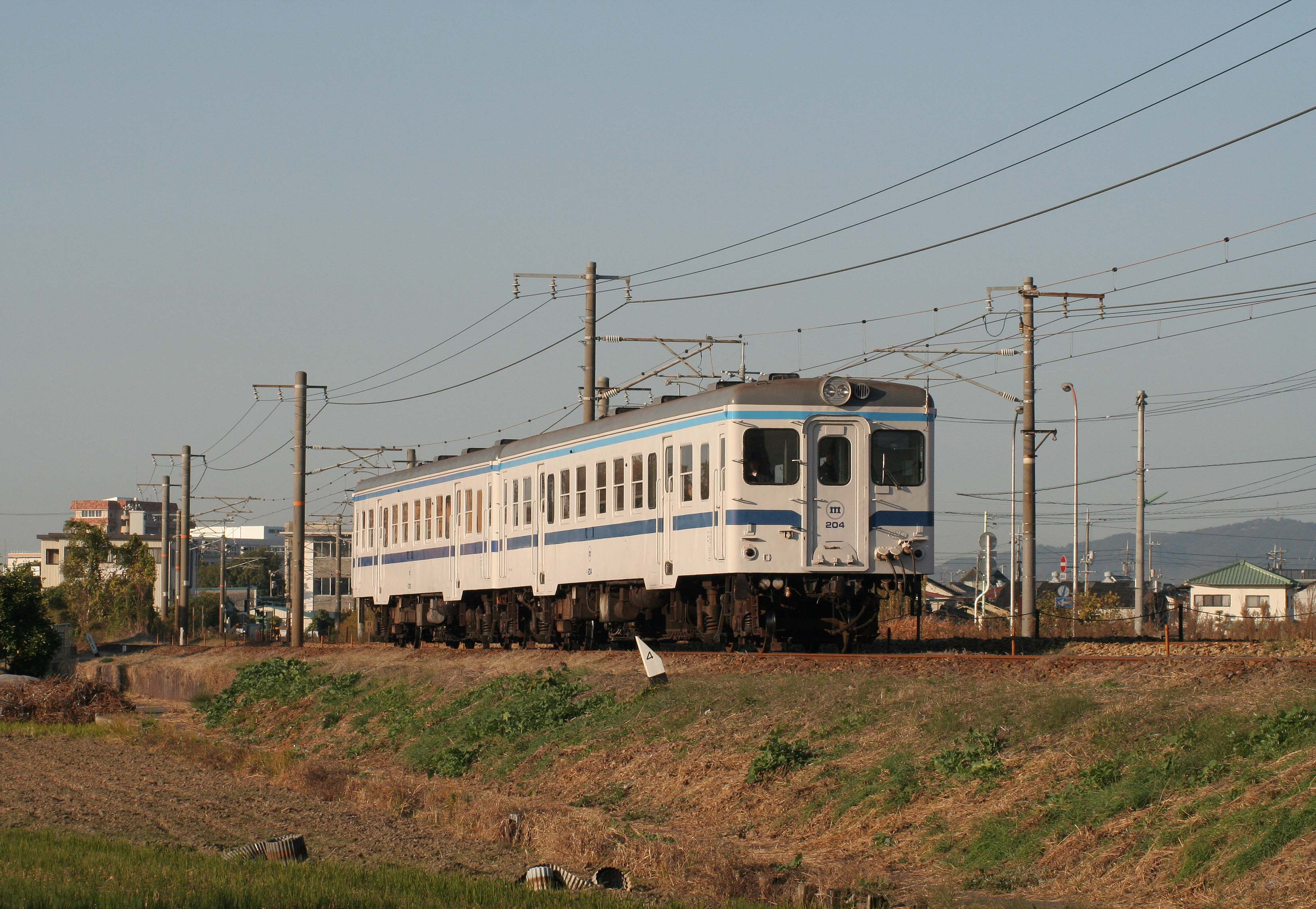
- A KiHa-20 passenger train between Kurashiki-shi and Kyūjōmae stations

Overview
- Native name: 水島本線
- Owner: Mizushima Rinkai Railway
- Locale: Kurashiki, Okayama
- Termini: Kurashiki-shi; Mitsubishi-jikō-mae
- Stations: 11 (1 freight only)
- Website: www.mizurin.co.jp

Service
- Type: Heavy rail
- Daily ridership: 4,362 passengers (2010)

History
- Opened: 30 June 1943

Technical
- Line length: 11.2 km (7.0 mi)
- Track gauge: 1,067 mm (3 ft 6 in)
- Electrification: No
- Operating speed: 60 km/h (37 mph)
Route map

Mizushima Main Line (水島本線, Mizushima-honsen) is a 11.2 km railway line owned by Mizushima Rinkai Railway, serving Kurashiki, Okayama Prefecture, Japan. The line branches southward from the San'yō Main Line, owned by JR West, at Kurashiki-shi Station, ending in the industrial district of Mizushima.

Originally an industrial railway for the military in Mizushima, passenger services began in 1948. The line switched hands three times before being owned and operated by Mizushima Rinkai Railway.

== Operations ==
The line is not electrified and is single-tracked for the entire line, with passing loops at Nishitomii, Yayoi, and Mizushima stations.

Most passenger rail services begin at Kurashiki-shi and terminate in Mizushima, except services during morning rush hours and a few others throughout during the day, which terminate in Mitsubishi-jikō-mae. Trains depart roughly every 30 minutes.

== Stations ==
| No. | Name | | Distance (km) | Connections | Location | |
|---|---|---|---|---|---|---|
| MR0 | Kurashiki-shi | 倉敷市 | 0.0 | JR West: San'yō Main Line・Hakubi Line (via Kurashiki Station) | Kurashiki | Okayama |
| MR1 | Kyūjōmae | 球場前 | 2.0 | | Kurashiki | Okayama |
| MR2 | Nishitomii | 西富井 | 3.6 | | Kurashiki | Okayama |
| MR3 | Fukui | 福井 | 4.4 | | Kurashiki | Okayama |
| MR4 | Urada | 浦田 | 5.5 | | Kurashiki | Okayama |
| MR5 | Yayoi | 弥生 | 7.5 | | Kurashiki | Okayama |
| MR6 | Sakae | 栄 | 8.2 | | Kurashiki | Okayama |
| MR7 | Tokiwa | 常盤 | 8.6 | | Kurashiki | Okayama |
| MR8 | Mizushima | 水島 | 9.2 | | Kurashiki | Okayama |
| MR9 | Mitsubishi-jikō-mae | 三菱自工前 | 10.4 | | Kurashiki | Okayama |
| | Kurashiki-Kamotsu Terminal (freight only) | 倉敷貨物ターミナル | 11.2 | | Kurashiki | Okayama |
