= Mizushima Rinkai Railway =

Railway company in Okayama Prefecture, Japan

Mizushima Rinkai Railway (水島臨海鉄道, Mizushima Rinkai Tetsudō; "Mizushima Seaside Railway") is a third-sector railway company based in Kurashiki, Okayama, Japan. The company took over operation of three former Kurashiki City Transportation Bureau lines in 1970. It mainly transports freight for the industrial area around the Port of Mizushima, but also operates a passenger service on the Mizushima Main Line.

== Rolling stock ==
As of 1 July 2021, the railway operates a fleet of 11 diesel railcars and four diesel locomotives.

=== Diesel multiple units ===
- MRT300 x6
- KiHa 30 x1
- KiHa 37 x3
- KiHa 38 x1

In 2013, the company purchased six former KiHa 30, KiHa 37, and KiHa 38 diesel multiple unit (DMU) cars, which formerly operated on the JR East Kururi Line in Chiba Prefecture until they were withdrawn in December 2012. These entered service from 12 May 2014.

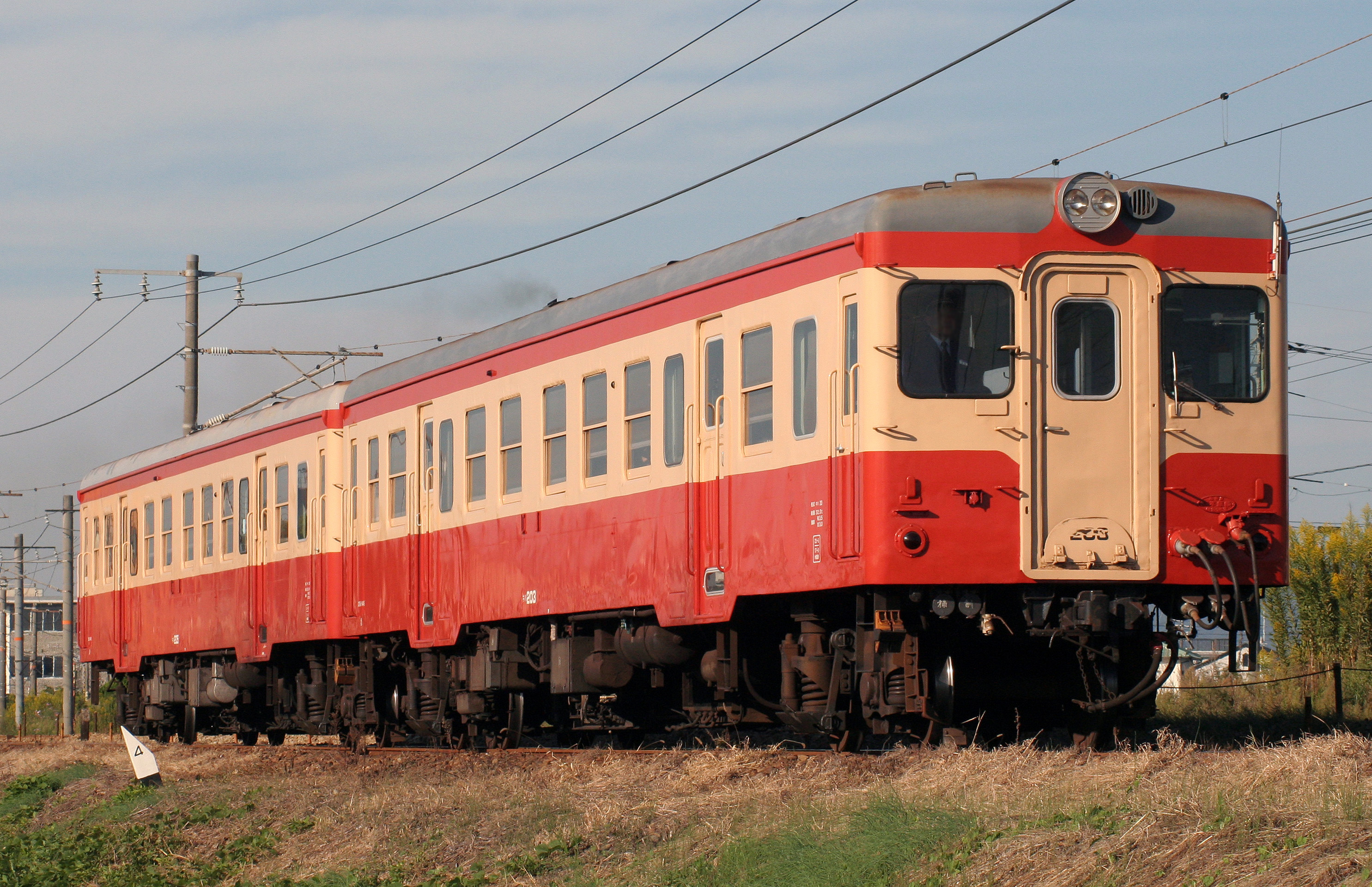
A pair of KiHa 20 DMUs

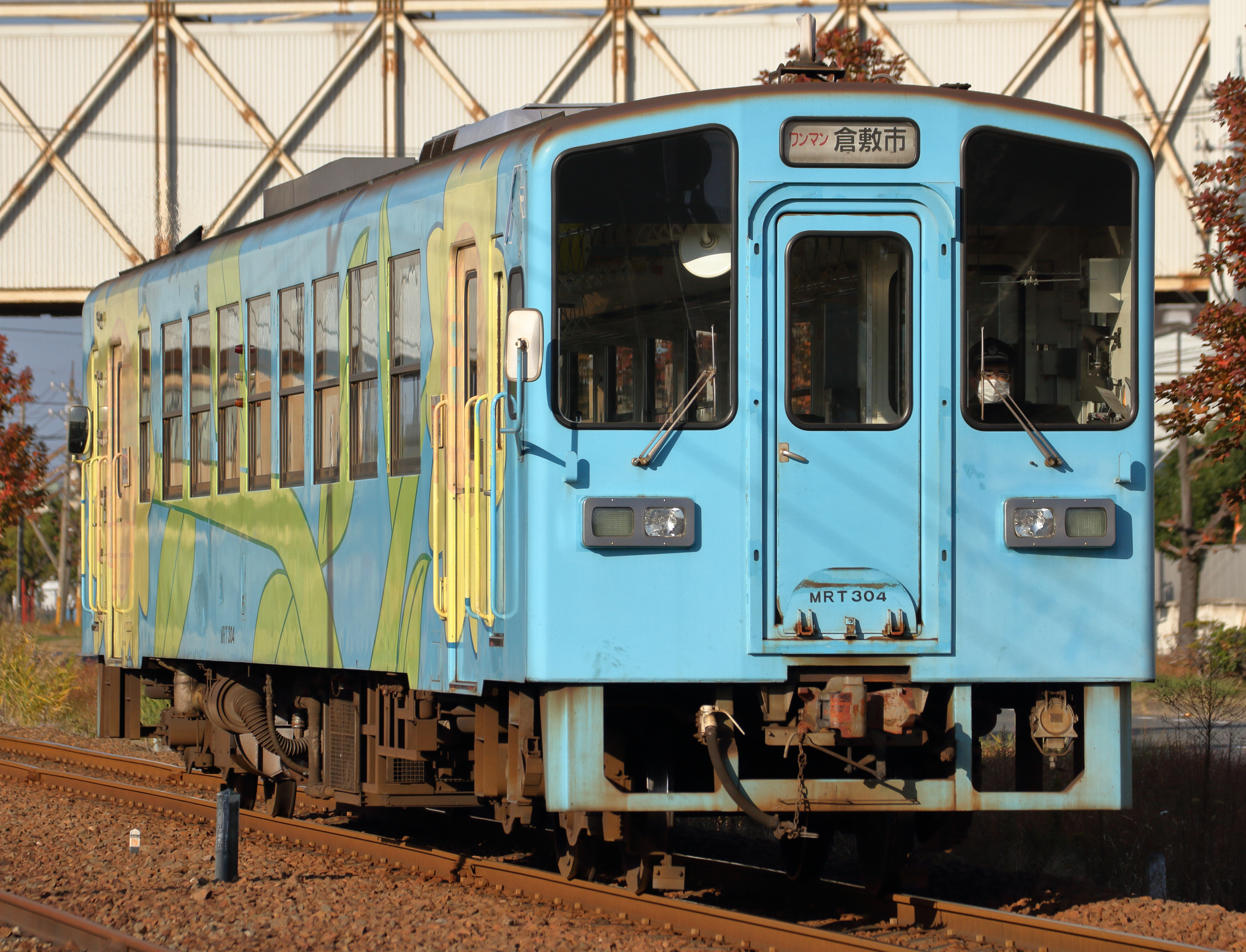
An MRT300 series "Himawari" DMU

=== Diesel locomotives ===
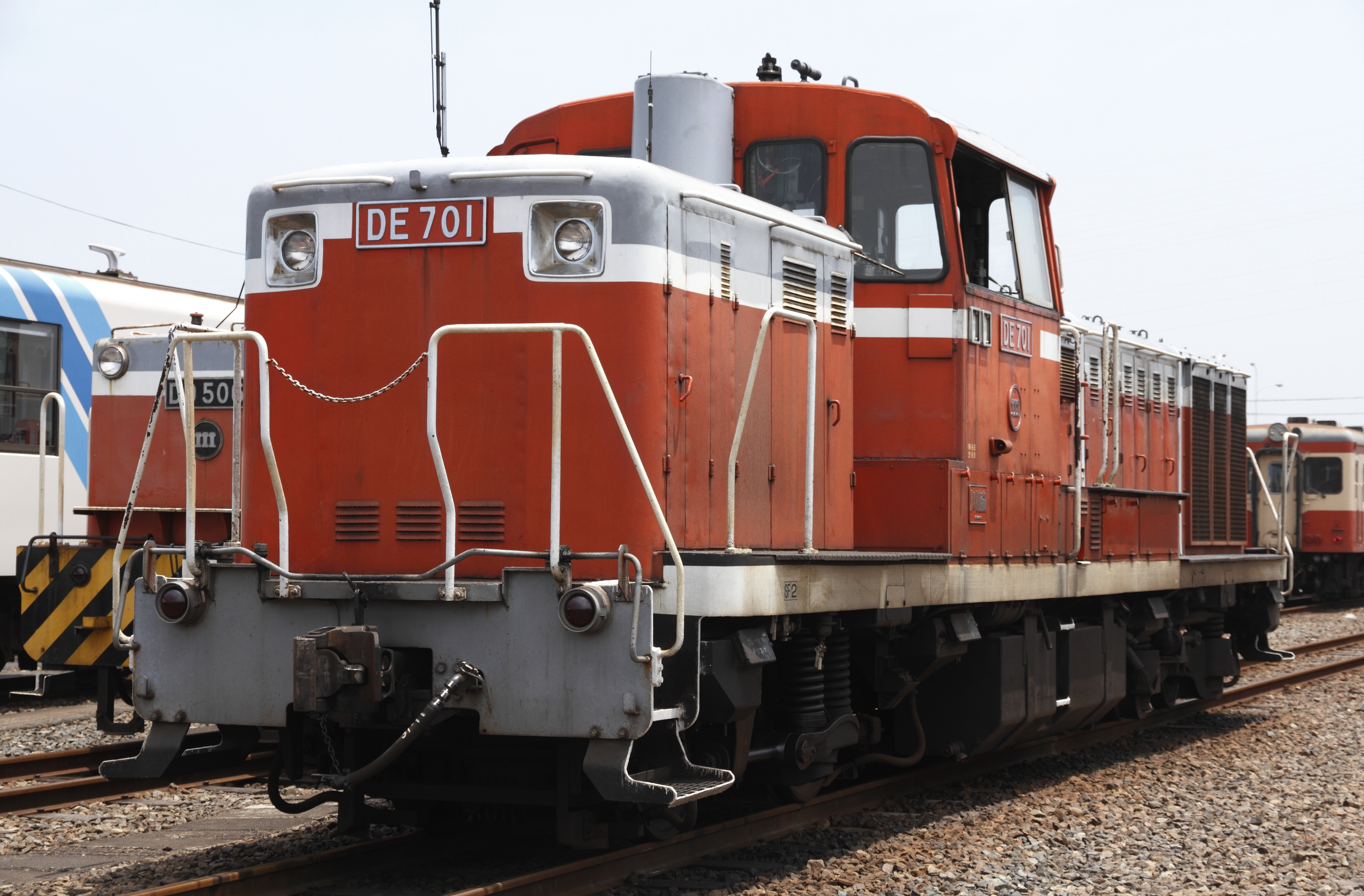
A Class DE70 diesel locomotive

- Class DE70 x1 (DE70 1)
- Class DD500 x2 (DD501 and DD506)
- Class DD200

== History ==
The 11.2 km Mizushima Main Line (水島本線) between Kurashiki-shi, Mitsubishi-jikō-mae, and Kurashiki Freight Terminal opened in 1943 to serve an aircraft factory. In 1947, the line was transferred to the city of Mizushima for industrial development, and a passenger service between Kurashiki and Mizushima commenced the following year.

The 3.6 km freight-only Kōtō Line (港東線) between Mizushima and Higashi-Mizushima, and the 0.8 km freight-only Nishi-Futō Line (西埠頭線) between Mitsubishi-jikō-mae and Nishi-Futō both opened in 1962.

CTC signalling was commissioned between Kurashiki and Mizushima in 1971, and the passenger service was extended to Mitsubishi-jikō-mae the following year.

== See also ==
- List of railway companies in Japan
