= Kawasaki Medical School =

University in Kurashiki, Japan

Coordinates: 34°37′55″N 133°48′41″E

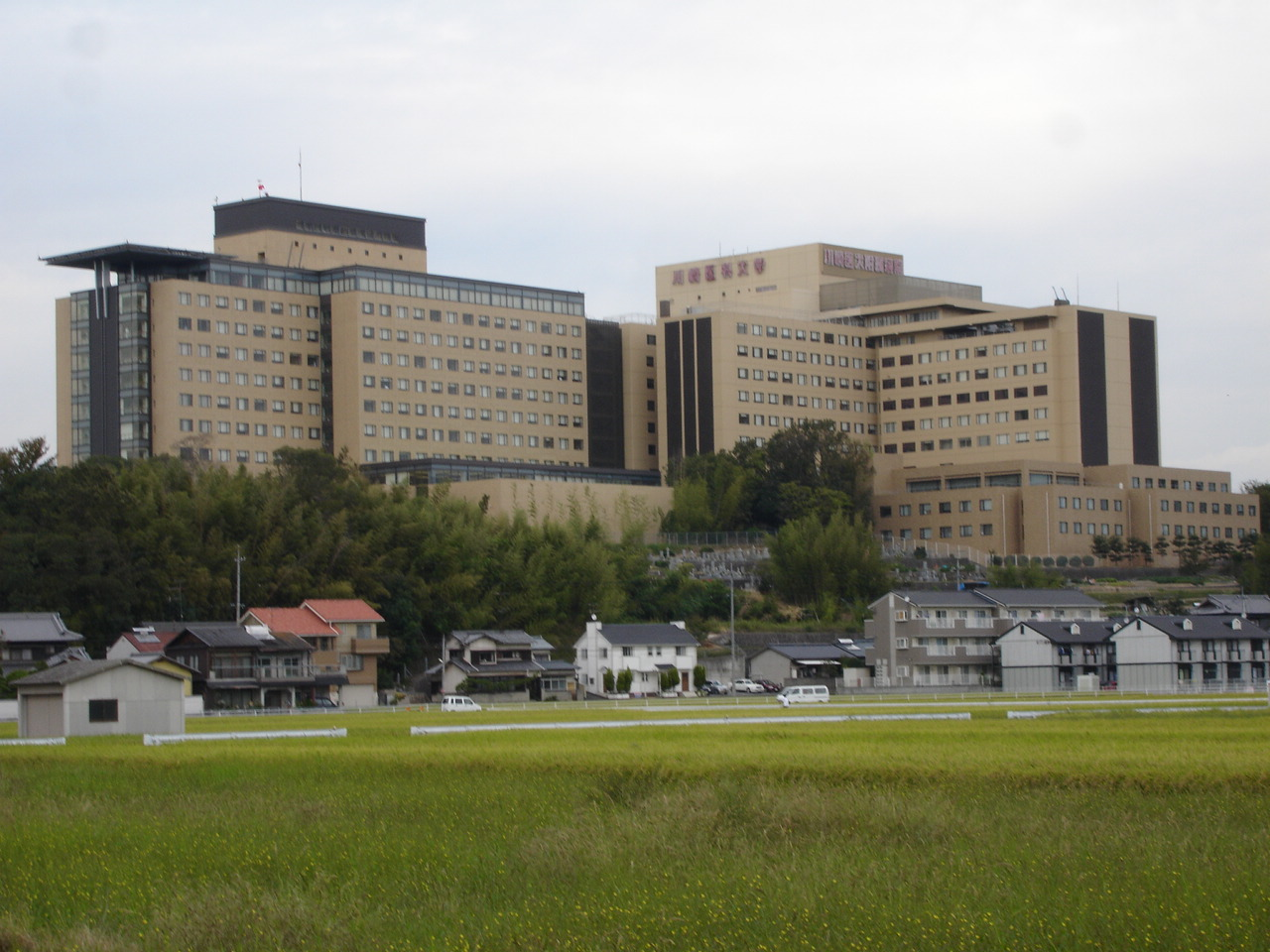
Kawasaki Medical School

Kawasaki Medical School (川崎医科大学, Kawasaki ika daigaku) is a private university in Kurashiki, Japan, established in April 1970.

== History ==
- 1938 - Dr.Kawasaki Sukenobu established "Showa hospital" in Okayama
- 1950 - "Showa hospital" became "Kawasaki Hospital"
- 1952 - Established "Asahigawa sō"(welfare facilities) in Okayama
- 1968 - Establishment of Medical school is authorized by Ministry of Welfare
- 1970 - Establishment of university
- 1976 - Establishment of Graduate school
- 1977 - Made affiliations with sister schools with University of Minnesota
- 1979 - Emergency room is set up
- 1982 - Made affiliations with sister schools with Capital Medical University in Beijing, China
- 1984 - Made affiliations with sister schools with Shanghai University of Chinese Traditional Medicine in Shanghai, China
- 1994 - Advanced emergency room is set up (First in Chūgoku region)
- 2001 - Helicopter Emergency Medical Service started (First in Japan)
- 2002 - Made Exchange agreement with Green College of University of Oxford
- 2004 - Kawasaki Sukenobu Memorial Auditorium is set up

== Organisation ==
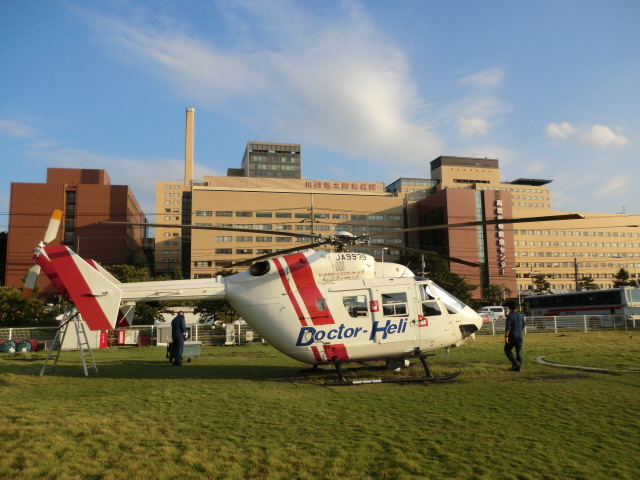
Medical helicopter of Kawasaki Medical School

- Medical school
  - Library
  - Central Research Center
  - Kawasaki Medical School Hospital
  - Kawasaki Hospital
  - Kawasaki Medical School Medical Museum
- Graduate school

=== Related Schools ===
- Kawasaki University of Medical Welfare
- Kawasaki College of Allied Health Professions
- Kawasaki Vocational Schools of Rehabilitation
- Kawasaki Senior High School Attached to Kawasaki Medical School

== Medical Museum of Kawasaki Medical School ==
Kawasaki Medical School (川崎医科大学 Kawasaki ika daigaku) is a private university in Kurashiki, Okayama, Japan, established in Spring, 1970. To commemorate the 10th anniversary of the school's foundation, an educational museum of medicine called the Medical Museum of Kawasaki Medical School (川崎医科大学現代医学教育博物館, Kawasaki Ika Daigaku Gendai igaku kyouiku hakubutukan) was built in 1981 to facilitate the independent learning of medical and postgraduate students. In this museum, the collected materials focus on the exposition of modern medicine rather than on historical materials. Students are able to instruct themselves by examining the exhibited specimens and to solidify their understanding. Practicing physicians are also welcome to visit the museum to further their medical education. It is also designed to propagate knowledge of medicine and health care to the general public.

== Related People ==
- Takahara Shigeo - One‐time Professor who discovered Acatalasia
