= Satoshō =

Satoshō 里庄町
- Town
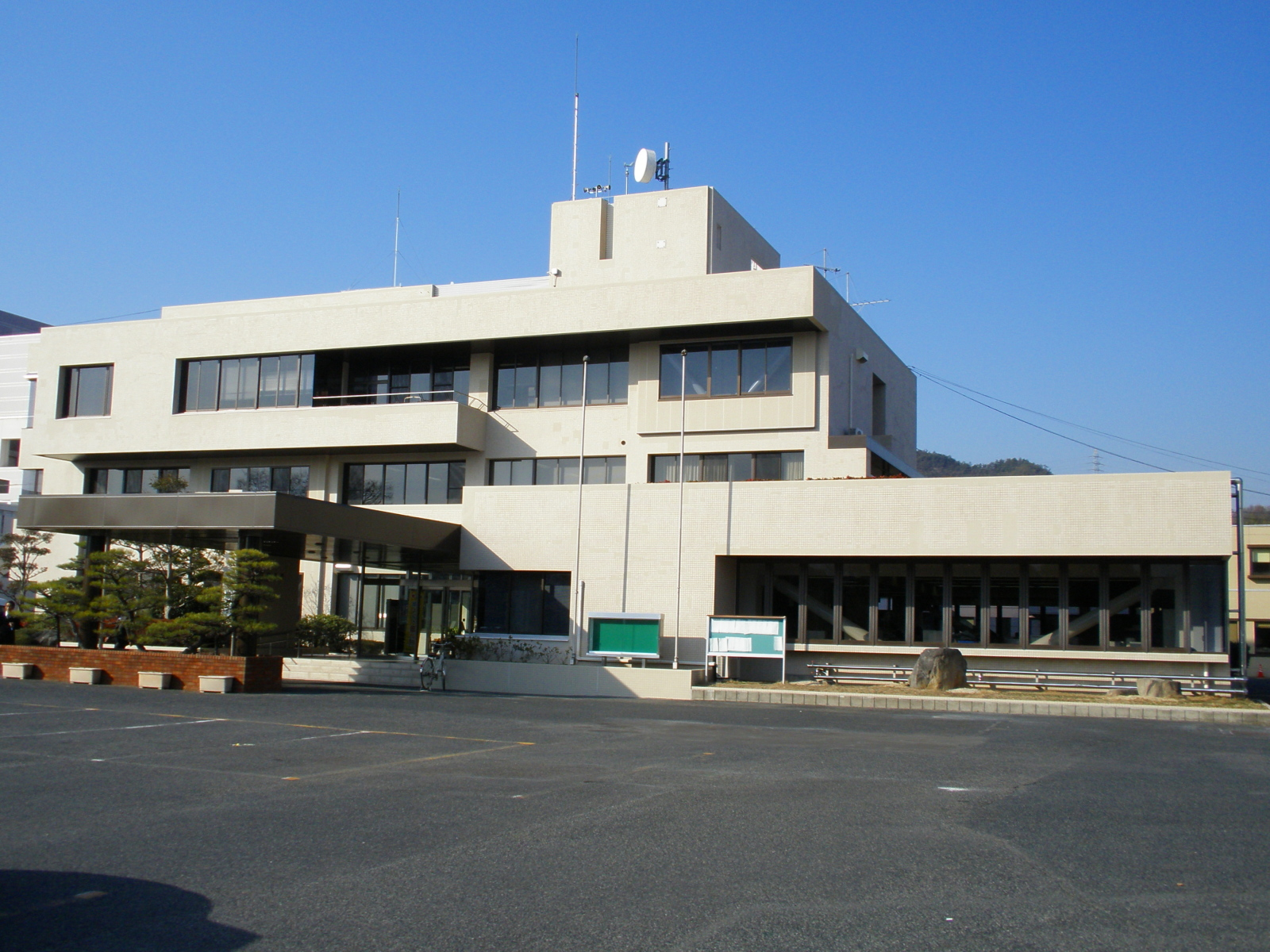
- Satoshō town office

- Flag Chapter
- Location of Satoshō in Okayama Prefecture

- Location in Japan
- Coordinates: 34°30′50″N 133°33′25″E
- Country: Japan
- Region: Chūgoku; San'yō
- Prefecture: Okayama
- District: Asakuchi

Area
  - Total: 12.23 km^{2} (4.72 sq mi)

Population (March 31, 2023)
  - Total: 11,026
  - Density: 901.6/km^{2} (2,335/sq mi)
- Time zone: UTC+09:00 (JST)
- Website: Official website
- Symbols
- Tree: Camellia japonica

Satoshō (里庄町, Satoshō-chō) is a town located in Asakuchi District, Okayama Prefecture, Japan. As of 1 March 2023, the town had an estimated population of 11,026 in 4636 households and a population density of 900 persons per km^{2}. The total area of the town is 12.23 square kilometres (4.72 sq mi).

== Geography ==
Satoshō is located in the southwestern Okayama Prefecture. The central and northwest part of the town is relatively flat, but the rest is forested.

=== Neighbouring municipalities ===
Okayama Prefecture

- Asakuchi
- Kasaoka

=== Climate ===
Satoshō has a humid subtropical climate (Köppen climate classification Cfa) with very warm summers and cool winters. The average annual temperature in Satoshō is 15.6 °C. The average annual rainfall is 1289 mm with September as the wettest month. The temperatures are highest on average in July, at around 27.1 °C, and lowest in January, at around 4.9 °C.

=== Demographics ===
Per Japanese census data, the population of Satoshō has been increasing for the past 60 years.

Historical population
Year	Pop.	±%
1920	5,870	—
1930	5,818	−0.9%
1940	5,708	−1.9%
1950	7,496	+31.3%
1960	7,056	−5.9%
1970	7,445	+5.5%
1980	9,038	+21.4%
1990	10,589	+17.2%
2000	10,782	+1.8%
2010	10,918	+1.3%

== History ==
The Satoshō area is part of ancient Bitchū Province. Following the Meiji restoration, the villages of Satomi (里見村) and Shinjō (新庄村) were established within Asakuchi District, Okayama with the creation of the modern municipalities system on April 1, 1889. The two villages merged on April 1, 1905, to form the village of Satoshō, which was elevated to town status on June 1, 1950. In 2005, it declined to amalgamate with the neighboring towns of Kamogata and Yorishima to form the city of Asakuchi.

== Government ==
Satoshō has a mayor-council form of government with a directly elected mayor and a unicameral town council of ten members. Satoshō, collectively with the city of Asakuchi, contributes one member to the Okayama Prefectural Assembly. In terms of national politics, the town is part of the Okayama 3rd district of the lower house of the Diet of Japan.

== Economy ==
The main economic activity of Satoshō is agriculture and food processing. Pharmaceuticals and electronics are also important. Due to its proximity to Kurashiki and Fukuyama, the town is increasingly becoming a commuter town.

== Education ==
Satoshō has two public elementary schools and one public junior high school operated by the town government. The town does not have a high school.

== Transportation ==
=== Railway ===
JR West (JR West) - San'yō Main Line

- Satoshō

=== Highways ===
- San'yō Expressway (there is no interchange within the town borders)
- National Route 2

== Notable people from Satoshō ==
- Fujii Kaze, singer-songwriter
- Yoshio Nishina, physicist
- Gōtarō Ogawa, former economist, educator, politician and cabinet minister
