= Kibi District, Okayama =

Former district in Okayama prefecture, Japan

Kibi (吉備郡, Kibi-gun) is a district located in Okayama Prefecture, Japan.

As of 2003, the district has an estimated population of 22,927 and a density of 520.12 inhabitants per square kilometre (1,347.1/sq mi). The total area is 44.08 km^{2} (17.02 sq mi).

== Towns and villages ==
- Mabi

== Merger ==
- On August 1, 2005 - the town of Mabi, along with the town of Funao (from Asakuchi District), was merged into the expanded city of Kurashiki. Kibi District was dissolved as a result of this merger.
