= Tamashima =

Tamashima may refer to:

- A minor planet of the Solar System, see: List of minor planets
- The Japanese town of Tamashima, merged into the town of Kurashiki in 1967
