= Yata Ōtsuka Kofun =

Kofun period burial mound

- 箭田大塚古墳 (Japanese)
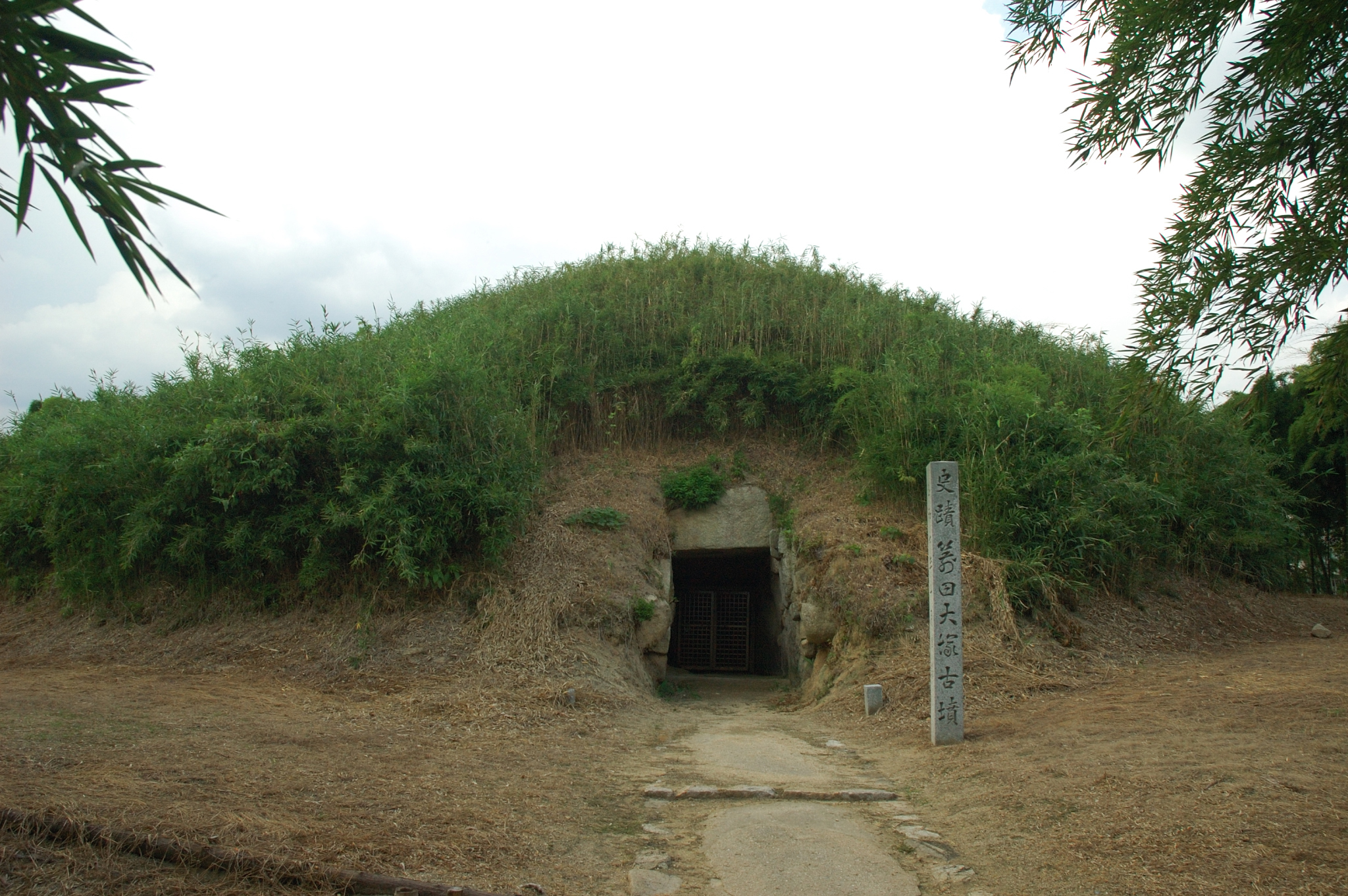
- Yata Ōtsuka Kofun

- Yata Ōtsuka Kofun Yata Ōtsuka Kofun (Japan)
- Interactive map of Yata Ōtsuka Kofun
- 34°38′8.18″N 133°40′52.76″E
- Type: Kofun
- Periods: Kofun period
- Location: Kurashiki, Okayama, Japan
- Region: San'yō region

History
- Built: late 6th century

Site notes
- Public access: Yes (no facilities)

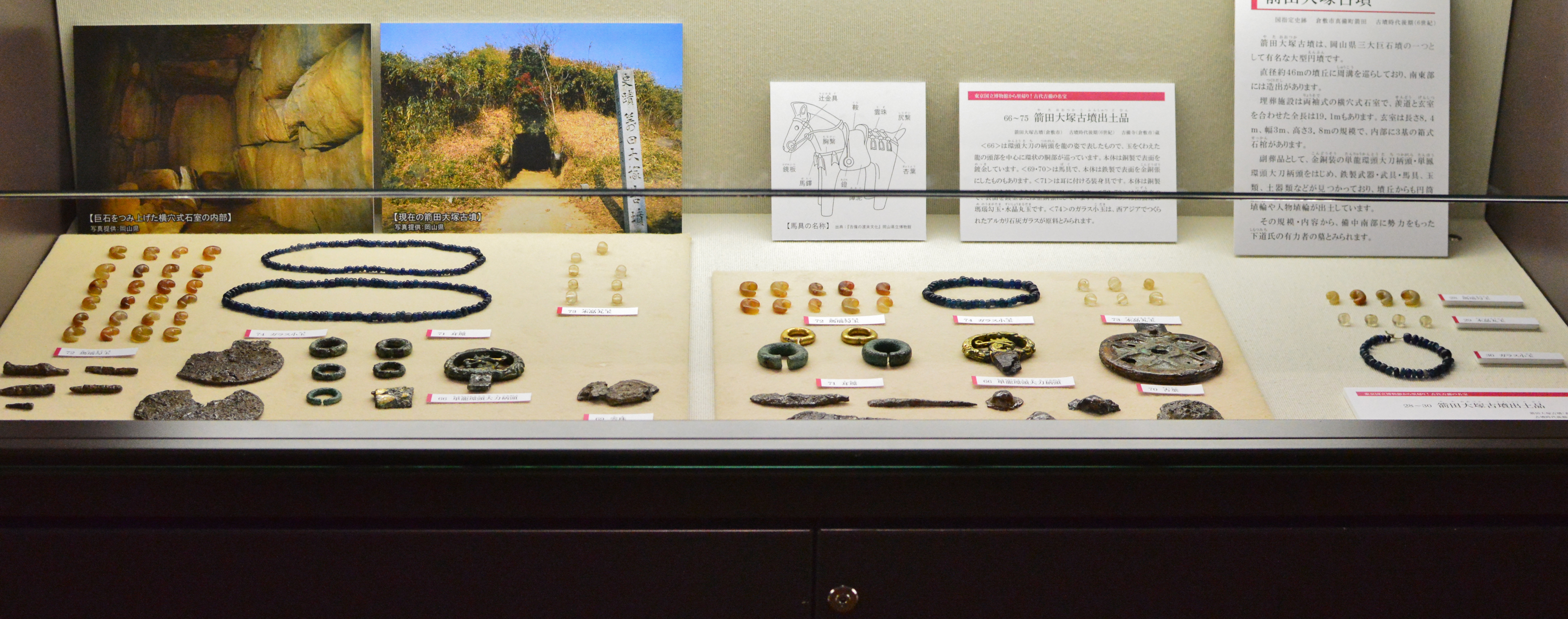
Grave goods from Yata Ōtsuka Kofun

Yata Ōtsuka Kofun (箭田大塚古墳) is a Kofun period burial mound located in the Mabi-chō neighborhood of the city of Kurashiki, Okayama Prefecture, in the San'yō region of Japan. The tumulus was designated a National Historic Site of Japan in 1929, with the area under protection expanded in 1992.

== Overview ==
The Yata Ōtsuka Kofun is located on the north bank of the Oda River near the confluence with the Takahashi River. It was excavated in 1901, during which time a large amount of grave goods, including Sue ware and Haji ware pottery, as well as iron swords, horse harnesses, metal rings, and magatama, were discovered. These artifacts are now in the collection of the Tokyo National Museum.

The stone burial chamber is a horizontal passage chamber made by precisely combining huge stones. The total length of the burial chamber including the passage is 19.1 meters, with the burial chamber itself measuring 8.4 by 3 meters, with a height of 3.8 meters. Inside the burial chamber are three interlocking sarcophaguses, which are believed to have been built in the late 6th century.

It was presumed that this tumulus was a zenpō-kōen-fun (前方後円墳), which is shaped like a keyhole when viewed from above, or a scallop-shaped tumulus (帆立貝形古墳, Hotategata-kofun), but a subsequent excavation in 1983 discovered a moat and revealed the shape to be a round (enpun (円墳))-style tumulus with a diameter of 54 meters and height of 7 meters.

The tumulus is about a 23-minute walk from Kibinomakibi Station on the Ibara Railway Ibara Line.

== See also ==
- List of Historic Sites of Japan (Okayama)
