= Kurashiki City College =

Coordinates: 34°29′52.3″N 133°48′31.8″E

Kurashiki City College (倉敷市立短期大学, Kurashiki-Shiritsu Tanki daigaku) is a public junior college in Kurashiki, Okayama, Japan, established in 1974. The predecessor of the school was founded in 1968.
