= Mabi, Okayama =

Dissolved municipality in Okayama Prefecture, Japan

Mabi (真備町, Mabi-chō) was a town located in Kibi District, Okayama Prefecture, Japan.

As of 2003, the town had an estimated population of 22,927 and a density of 520.12 persons per km^{2}. The total area was 44.08 km^{2}.

On August 1, 2005, Mabi, along with the town of Funao (from Asakuchi District), was merged into the expanded city of Kurashiki.

Mabi is famous for its historical ties to Kibi no Makibi, a Nara period noble and scholar credited with bringing the game of Go to Japan. Sites associated with Kibi no Makibi in Mabi include the Makibi Memorial Museum and Makibi Park.

Floods caused by heavy rains in southwestern Japan in the summer of 2018 killed at least 46 residents.
