= Konkō, Okayama =

Dissolved municipality in Okayama prefecture, Japan

Konkō (金光町, Konkō-chō) was a town located in Asakuchi District, Okayama Prefecture, Japan.

As of 2003, the town had an estimated population of 12,382 and a density of 589.34 persons per km^{2}. The total area was 21.01 km^{2}.

On March 21, 2006, Konkō, along with the towns of Kamogata and Yorishima (all from Asakuchi District), was merged to create the city of Asakuchi.
