= Funao, Okayama =

Dissolved municipality in Okayama Prefecture, Japan

Funao (船穂町, Funao-chō) was a town located in Asakuchi District, Okayama Prefecture, Japan.

As of 2003, Funao had an estimated population of 7,393 and a density of 682.01 persons per km^{2}. The total area of the town was 10.84 km^{2}.

On August 1, 2005, Funao, along with the town of Mabi (from Kibi District), was merged into the expanded city of Kurashiki.
