= Magosaburō Ōhara =

Japanese businessman and philanthropist

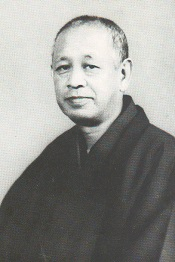
Magosaburō Ōhara

Magosaburō Ōhara (大原 孫三郎, Ōhara Magosaburō; July 28, 1880 - January 18, 1943) was a Japanese businessman and philanthropist. He was born in Kurashiki, Okayama. He studied at Waseda University but left Waseda before graduation. Later he became the most influential person in Kansai business community.

== Founded ==
He founded Ōhara Art Museum, and the Kuraray chemical company.

== Origins ==
He was a native of Kurashiki, Okayama.

== Honours ==
- the Medal with Dark Blue Ribbon (1920)
- the 3rd class of the Order of the Sacred Treasure (1930)

== See also ==
- Ōhara Art Museum
- Ōhara Institute for Social Research, Hosei University
- Institute of Plant Science and Resources, Okayama University
- Ōhara Memorial Institute for Science of Labour
- Kurashiki Central Hospital
