= Kurashiki Sakuyo University =

Private university in Japan

Coordinates: 34°34′30″N 133°40′41″E

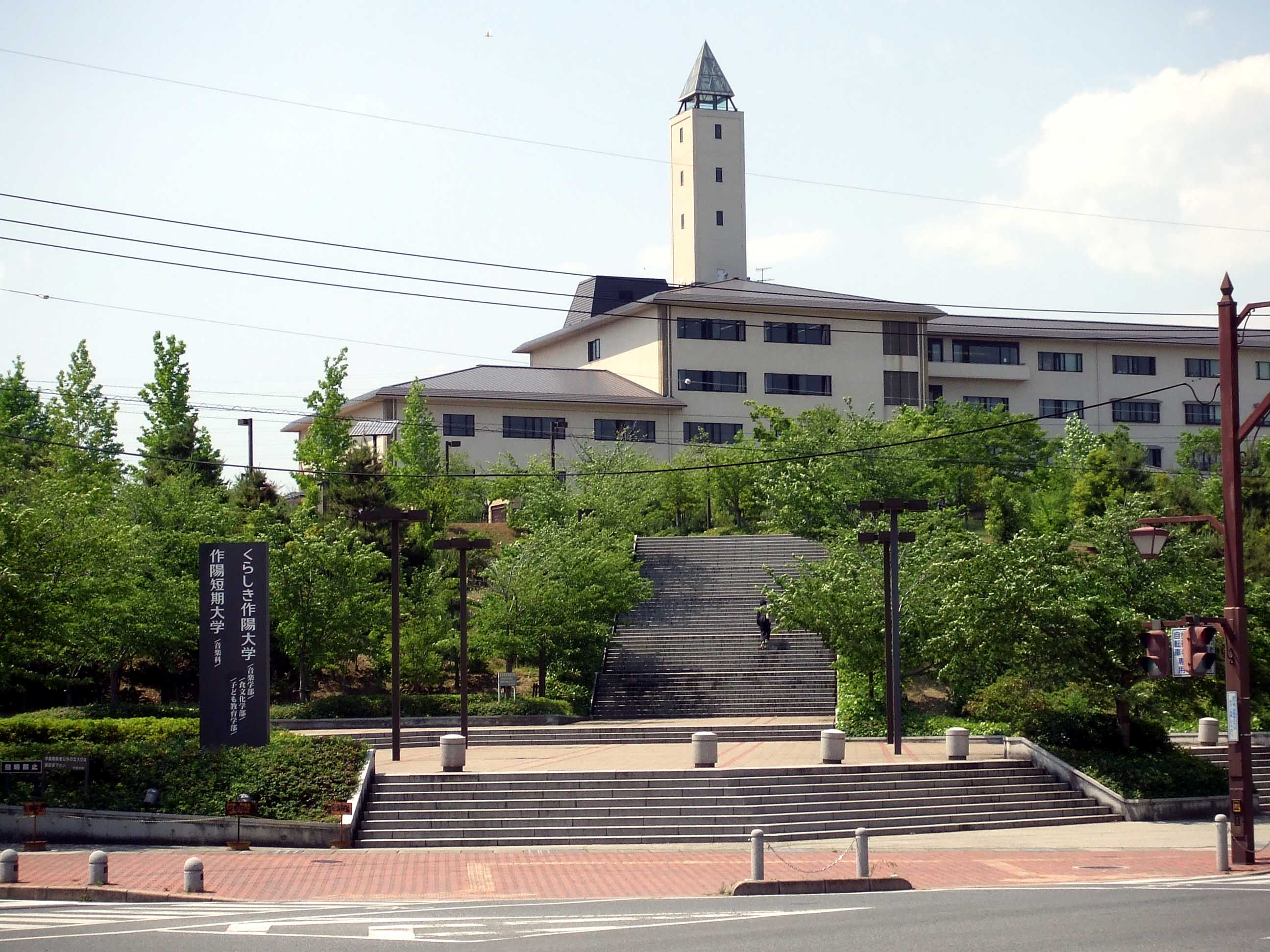
Kurashiki Sakuyo University

Kurashiki Sakuyo University (くらしき作陽大学, Kurashiki sakuyō daigaku), commonly abbreviated as Sakuyo or Sakuyo University, is a private university in Kurashiki, Okayama, Japan. The predecessor of the school was founded in 1930, and it was chartered as a junior college in 1951. In 1966, it became a four-year college.
