= Asakuchi =

Asakuchi 浅口市
- City
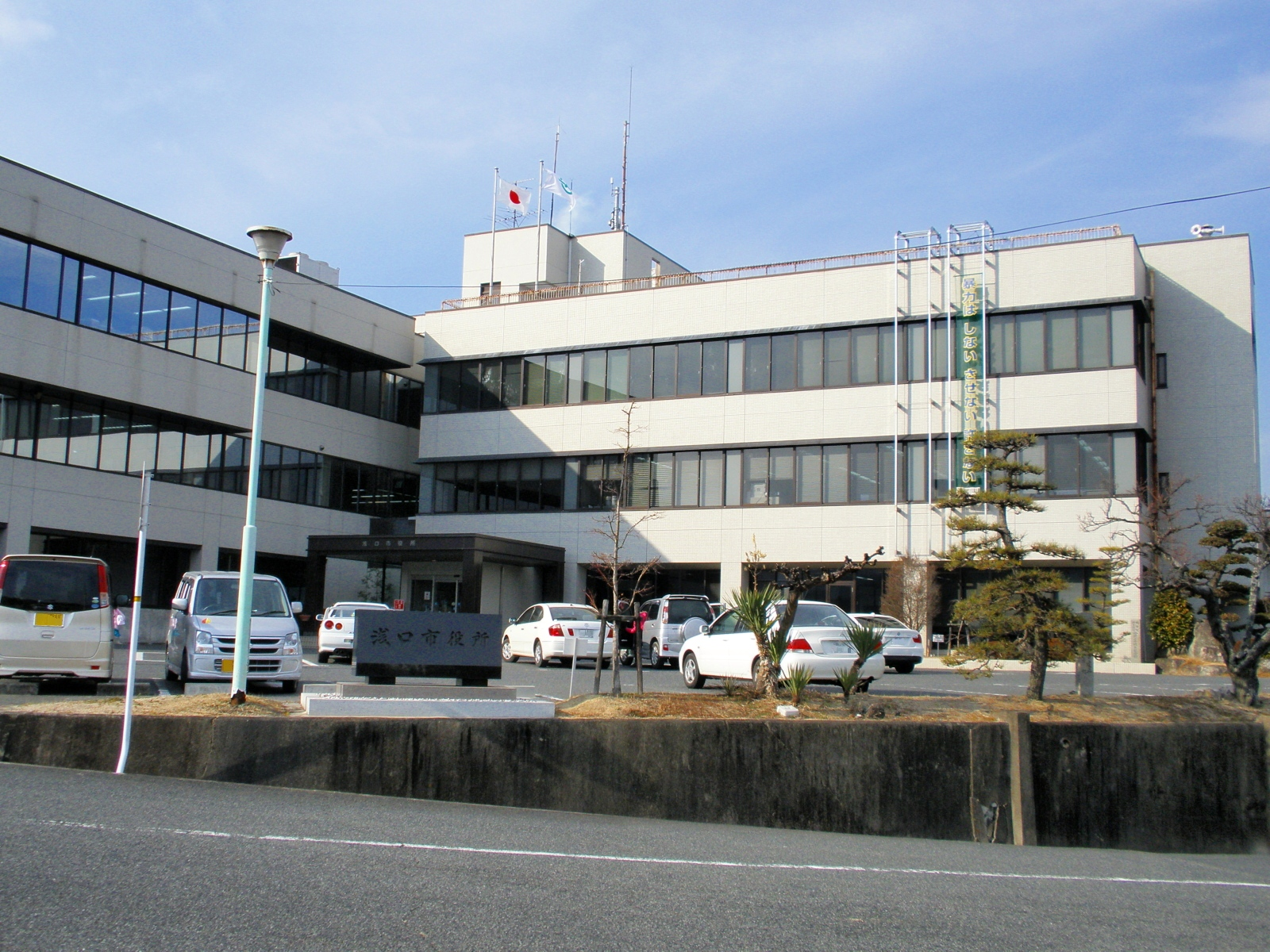
- Asakuchi city office

- Flag Seal
- Interactive map of Asakuchi
- Coordinates: 34°31′29″N 133°35′15″E
- Country: Japan
- Region: Chūgoku; San'yō
- Prefecture: Okayama

Government
  - Mayor: Yasuhiko Kuriyama (since April 2010)

Area
  - Total: 66.46 km^{2} (25.66 sq mi)

Population (February 28, 2023)
  - Total: 33,322
  - Density: 501.4/km^{2} (1,299/sq mi)
- Time zone: UTC+9 (Japan Standard Time)
- City hall address: 3050 Rokujō-in Naka, Kamogata-machi, Asakuchi-shi, Okayama-ken 719-0295
- Climate: Cfa
- Website: Official website
- Symbols
- Tree: Sakura

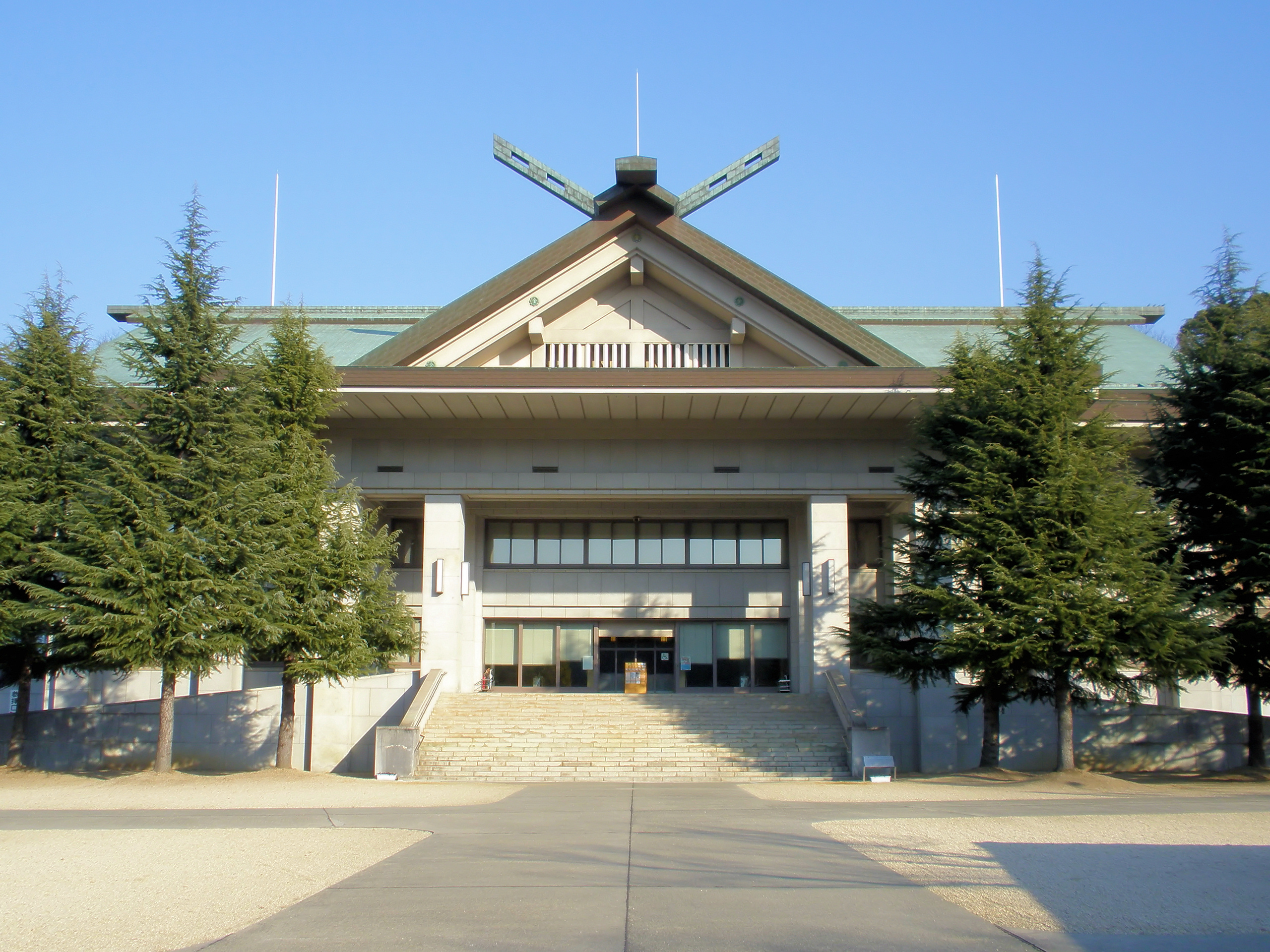
Konkokyo Headquarters Central Worship Hall

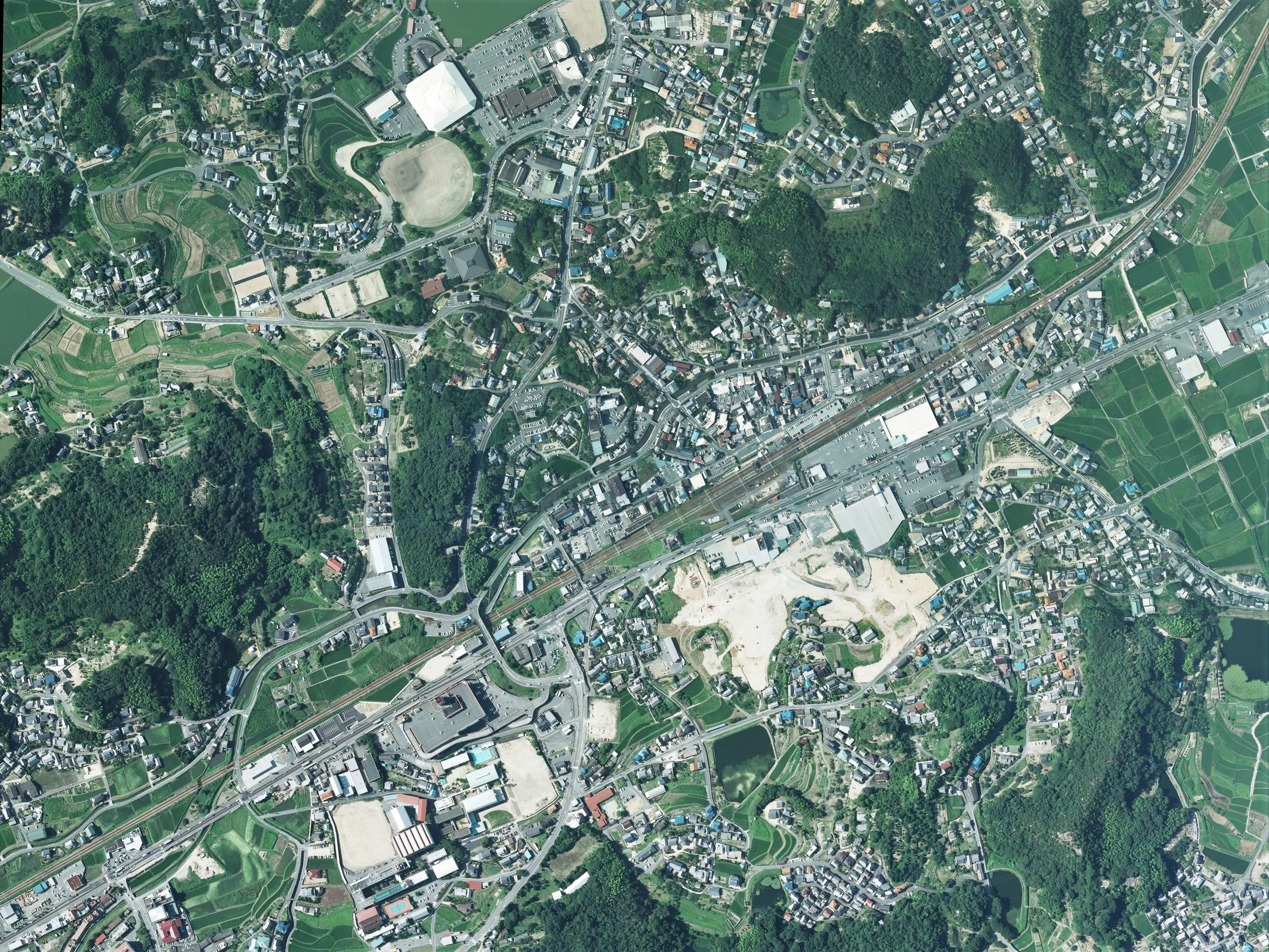
Aerial view of Asakuchi city center

Asakuchi (浅口市, Asakuchi-shi; Japanese pronunciation: [ä̀.sä́.kɯ̥̈.c̟͡ɕì, -c̟͡ɕí.ɕì]) is a city located in Okayama Prefecture, Japan. As of 1 March 2023, the city had an estimated population of 33,322 in 14,409 households and a population density of 500 persons per km^{2}. The total area of the city is 66.464 square kilometres (25.662 sq mi). The headquarters of the Konkokyo religion is in Asakuchi.

== Geography ==
Asakuchi is in the southwestern Okayama Prefecture, bordered by the Seto Inland Sea to the south. It is mostly hilly, with Mount Yosho and Mount Chikurinji in the north, Mount Abe in the northwest, and Mount Ryuo in the center. The southern part of the city is close to the Mizushima industrial area (approximately 10 km kilometers and the Fukuyama industrial area (approximately 20 kilometers).

=== Adjoining municipalities ===
Okayama Prefecture

- Kasaoka
- Kurashiki
- Satoshō
- Yakage

=== Climate ===
Asakuchi has a humid subtropical climate (Köppen climate classification Cfa) with very warm summers and cool winters. The average annual temperature in Asakuchi is 15.6 °C. The average annual rainfall is 1289 mm with September as the wettest month. The temperatures are highest on average in July, at around 27.1 °C, and lowest in January, at around 4.9 °C.

=== Demographics ===
Per Japanese census data, the population of Asakuchi has remained stable for the past 60 years.

Historical population
Year	Pop.	±%
1950	39,126	—
1960	37,002	−5.4%
1970	34,889	−5.7%
1980	39,360	+12.8%
1990	39,415	+0.1%
2000	37,724	−4.3%
2010	36,064	−4.4%

== History ==
The Asakuchi area is part of ancient Bitchū Province and numerous shell middens from the Jōmon period confirm that the area has been inhabited since prehistoric times. Following the Meiji restoration, the villages of Kamogata and Yorishima were established within Asakuchi District, Okayama with the creation of the modern municipalities system on June 1, 1889. Yorishima was elevated to town status on February 6, 1901 and Kamogata on October 25, 1925. On March 21, 2006 Kamogata and Yorishima merged with the town of Konkō (also from Asakuchi District) to form the city of Asakuchi.

== Government ==
Asakuchi has a mayor-council form of government with a directly elected mayor and a unicameral city council of 16 members. Asakuchi, together with the town of Satoshō contributes two members to the Okayama Prefectural Assembly. In terms of national politics, the city is part of the Okayama 3rd district of the lower house of the Diet of Japan.

== Economy ==
Asakuchi is a regional commercial center with a mixed economy of agriculture and light manufacturing. The city is also increasing a commuter town for Fukuyama and Kurashiki.

== Education ==
Asakuchi has seven public elementary schools and three public junior high schools operated by the city government and one private junior high school. The city has one public high school operated by the Okayama prefectural Board of Education and two private high schools.

== Transportation ==
=== Railway ===
JR West (JR West) - San'yō Main Line

- Konkō - Kamogata

=== Highways ===
- San'yō Expressway
- National Route 2

== Sister cities ==
- City of Tea Tree Gully, Australia (2007)
- Gao'an, China (2009)

== Noted people from Asakuchi ==
- Hideo Nakata, movie director
