= Yorishima, Okayama =

Dissolved municipality in Okayama prefecture, Japan

Yorishima (寄島町, Yorishima-chō) was a town located in Asakuchi District, Okayama Prefecture, Japan.

As of 2003, the town had an estimated population of 6,529 and a density of 724.64 persons per km^{2}. The total area was 9.01 km^{2}.

On March 21, 2006, Yorishima, along with the towns of Kamogata and Konkō (all from Asakuchi District), was merged to create the city of Asakuchi.
