= Kamogata, Okayama =

Town in Japan

Kamogata (鴨方町, Kamogata-chō) was a town located in Asakuchi District in the south-west of Okayama Prefecture, Japan. On March 21, 2006, Kamogata, along with the towns of Konkō and Yorishima (all from Asakuchi District), was merged to create the city of Asakuchi.

As of 2003, the town had an estimated population of 18,446 and a density of 506.20 persons per km^{2}. The total area was 36.44 km^{2}.

== Geography ==
Sandwiched between mountainous forests to the north and south, the central part of Kamogata remains relatively flat.

- Land area: 36.44 km^{2}
- Population: 19,206 (As of 31 December 2004)
- Number of households: 6,42世帯 (As of 31 December 2004)

=== Topography ===
- Mountains: Mt Youshou, Mt Chikurinji, Mt Abe, Mt Ryuuou
- Rivers: Kamogata River, Satomi River

== Public Services ==
- Kamogata Post Office
- Kamogata Townhouse Post Office (Renamed from Kamogata Honcho Post Office on 16 March 2004)
- Kanpo no Yado Mt Youshou
- Kasaoka District Association for Firefighting, Kamogata Fire Station
- Kamogata Water Treatment Plant
- Kamogata Purification Centre
- Kamogata Town Library

== Education ==
=== Elementary schools ===
- Kamogata-nishi Elementary School
- Kamogata-higashi Elementary School
- Rokujoin Elementary School

=== Junior high schools ===
- Kamogata Junior High School

=== High schools ===
- Kamogata High School
- Okayama Sanyo School (No.1 Harada Gakuen Group)

=== Technical Colleges ===
- Okayama Automobile Engineering College (No.1 Harada Gakuen Group)

== Industry ==
=== Local Specialties ===
- Kamogata Somen
- Kamogata Udon
- Bitchu Hiyamugi Noodles
- Japanese Sake
- Peaches
- Bouchan Pumpkin
