= Kawasaki College of Allied Health Professions =

Coordinates: 34°38′2.2″N 133°48′52.1″E

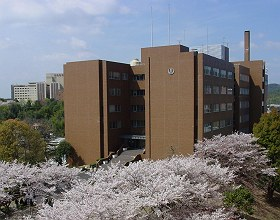
Kawasaki College of Allied Health Professions

Kawasaki College of Allied Health Professions (川崎医療短期大学, Kawasaki iryō tanki daigaku) is a private junior college in Kurashiki, Okayama, Japan, established in 1973.
