= Kurashiki =

Kurashiki 倉敷市
- Core city
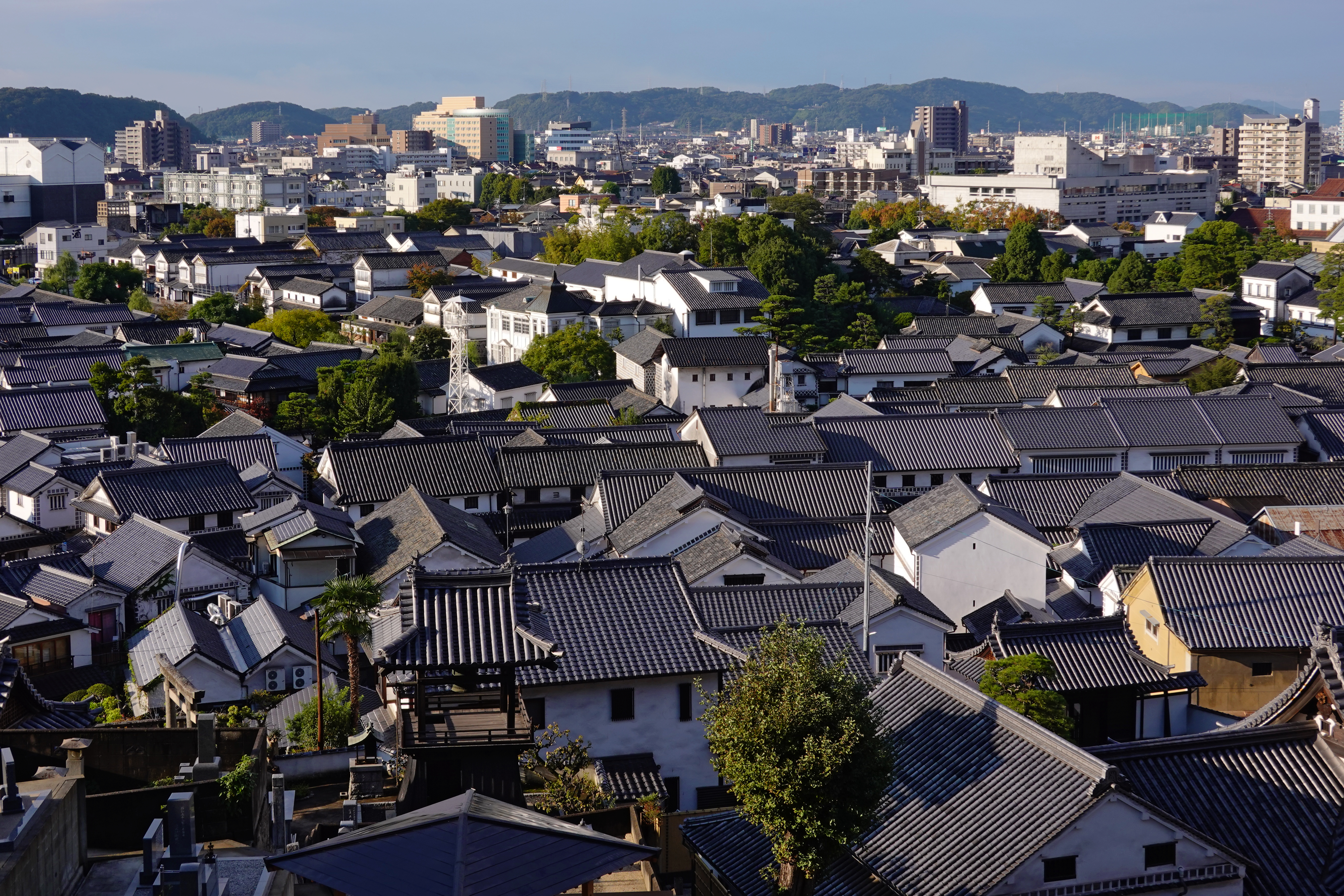

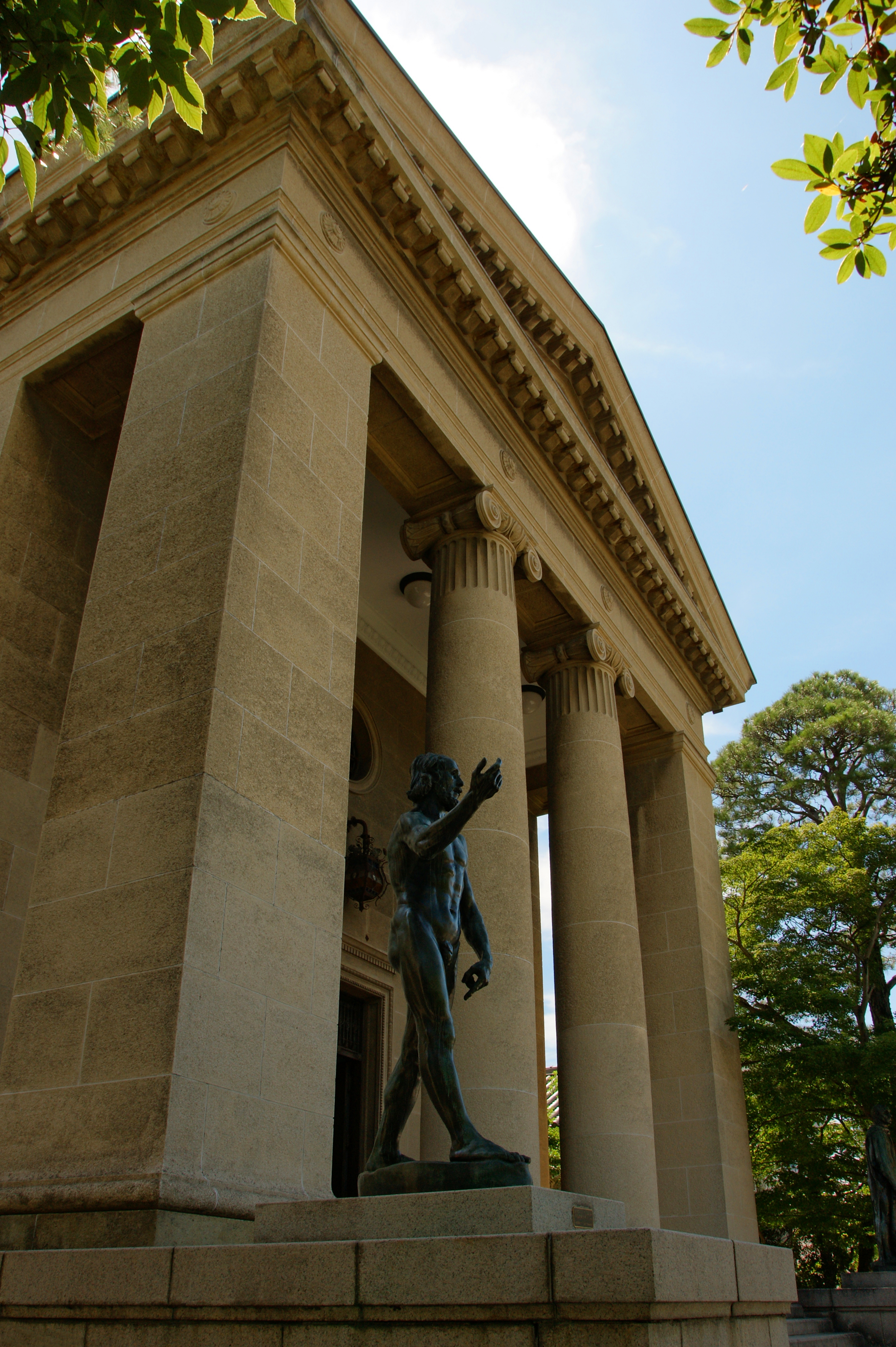

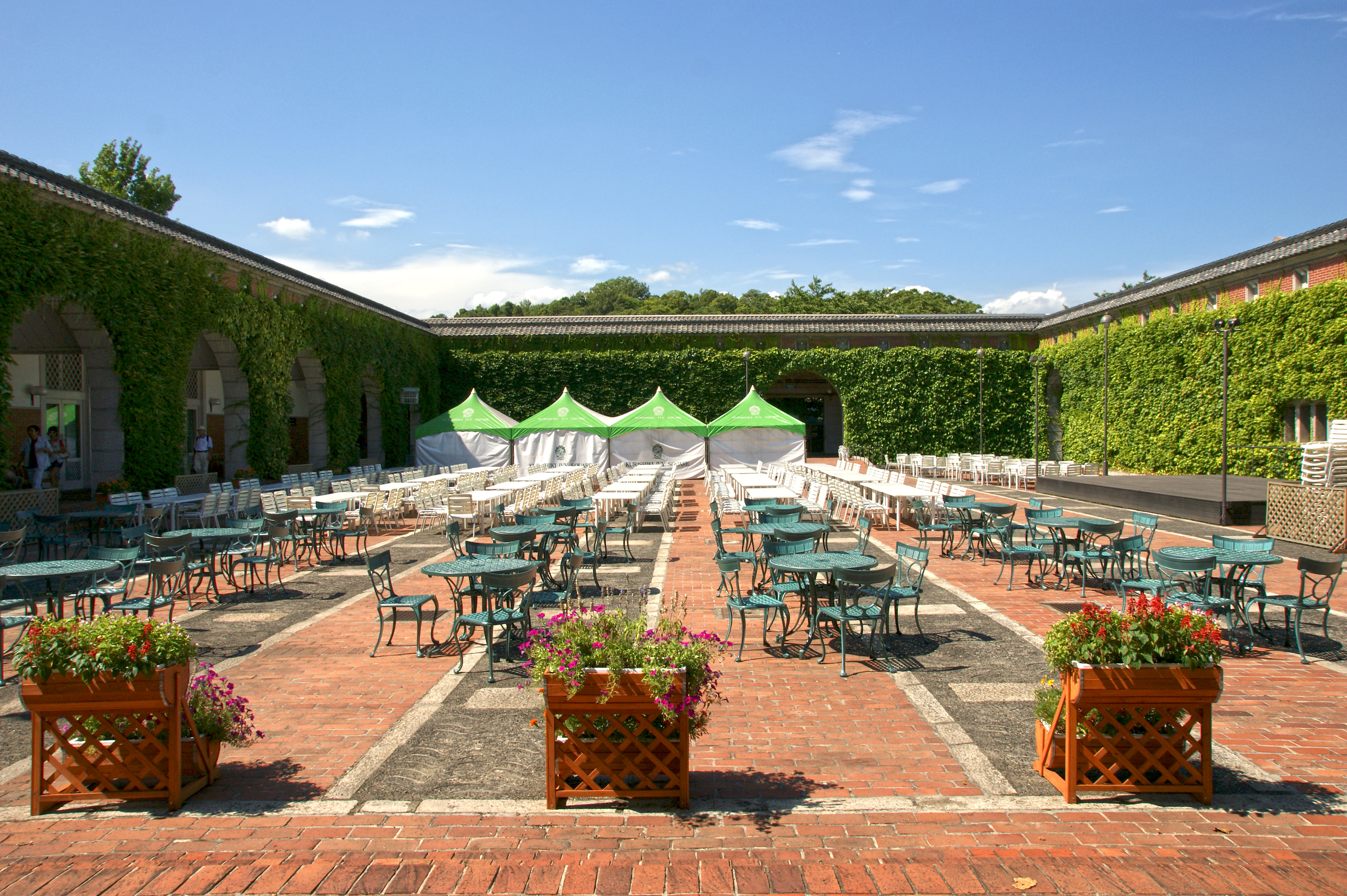

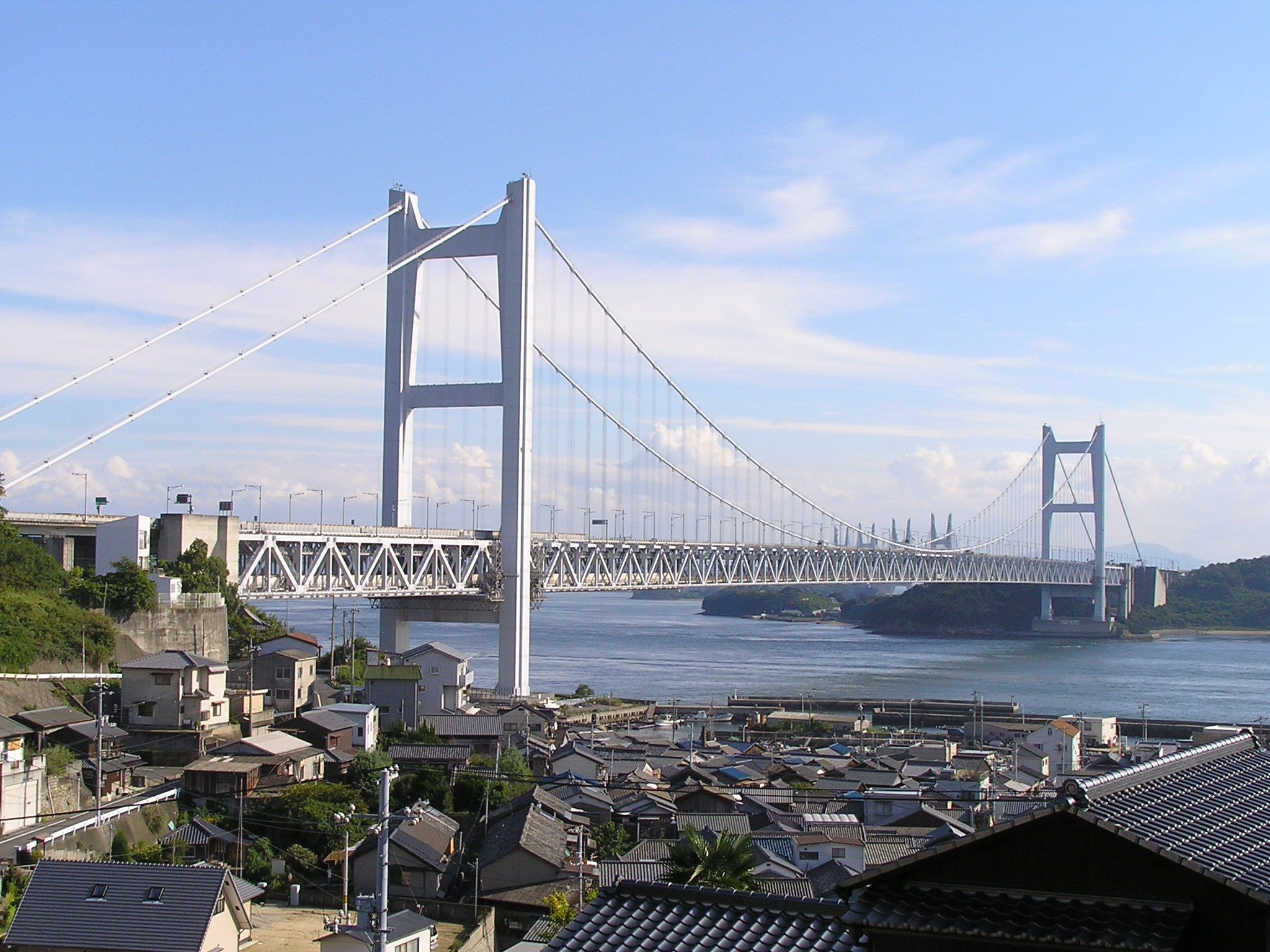

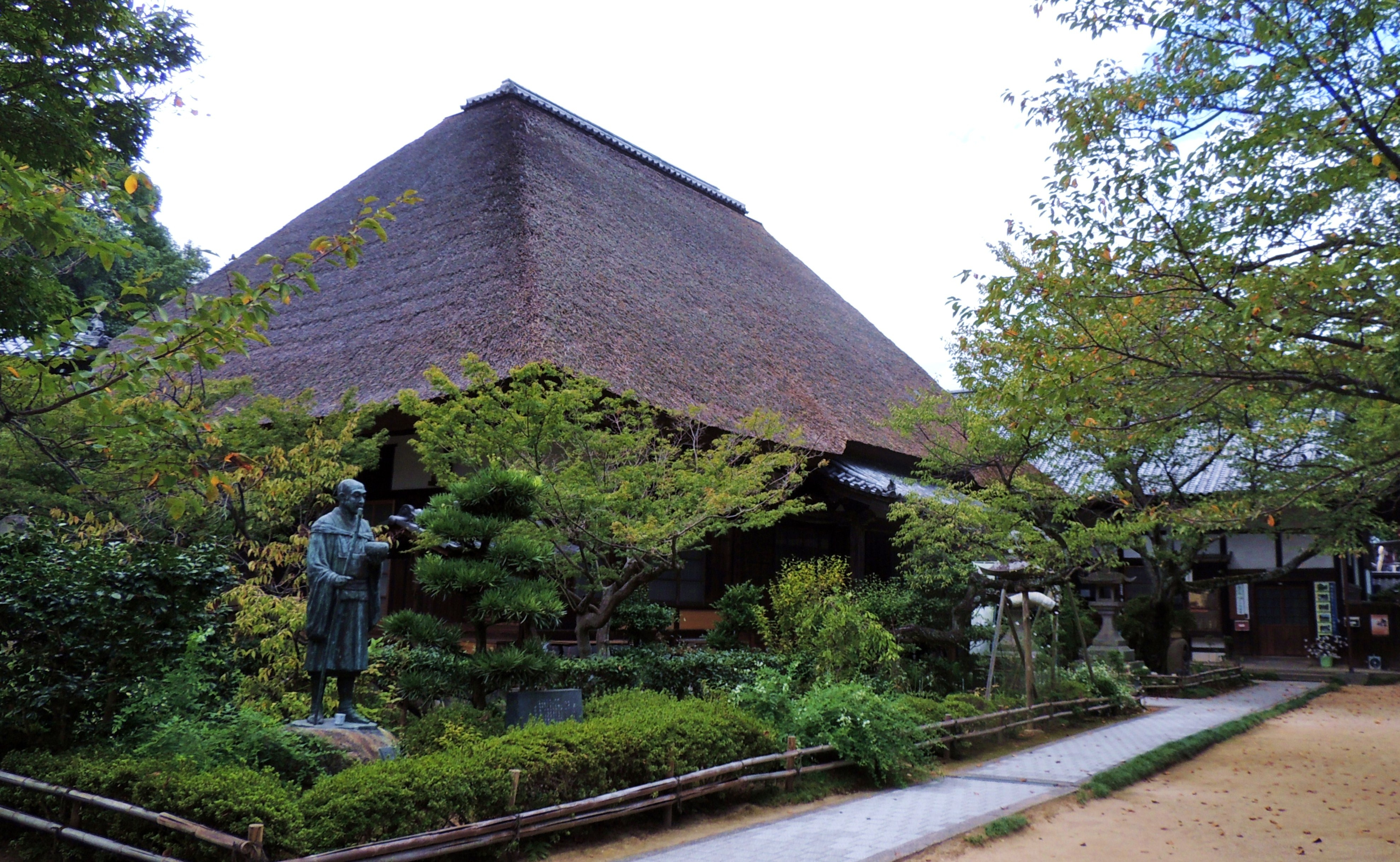

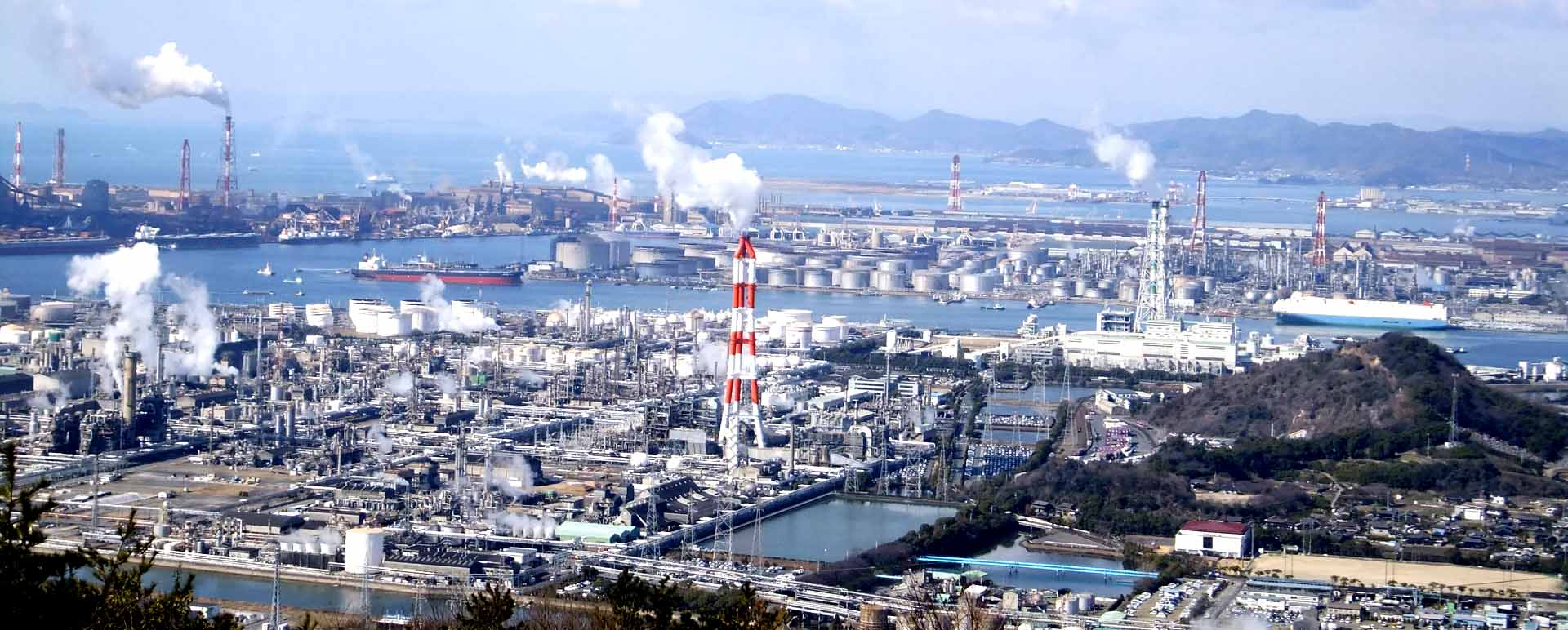
Bikan Historical Quarter
Ohara Museum of Art	Ivy Square
Shimotsuiseto Bridge	Entsu-ji
Mizushima Industrial Zone
- Flag Chapter
- Interactive map of Kurashiki
- Location in Japan
- Coordinates: 34°35′06″N 133°46′20″E
- Country: Japan
- Region: Chūgoku (San'yō)
- Prefecture: Okayama

Government
  - Mayor: Kaori Itō

Area
  - Total: 355.63 km^{2} (137.31 sq mi)

Population (March 31, 2023)
  - Total: 478,651
  - Density: 1,345.9/km^{2} (3,485.9/sq mi)
- Time zone: UTC+09:00 (JST)
- City hall address: 640 Nishinakashinden, Kurashiki-shi, Okayama-ken 710-8565
- Climate: Cfa
- Website: Official website
- Symbols
- Bird: Kingfisher
- Flower: Wysteria
- Tree: Camphor

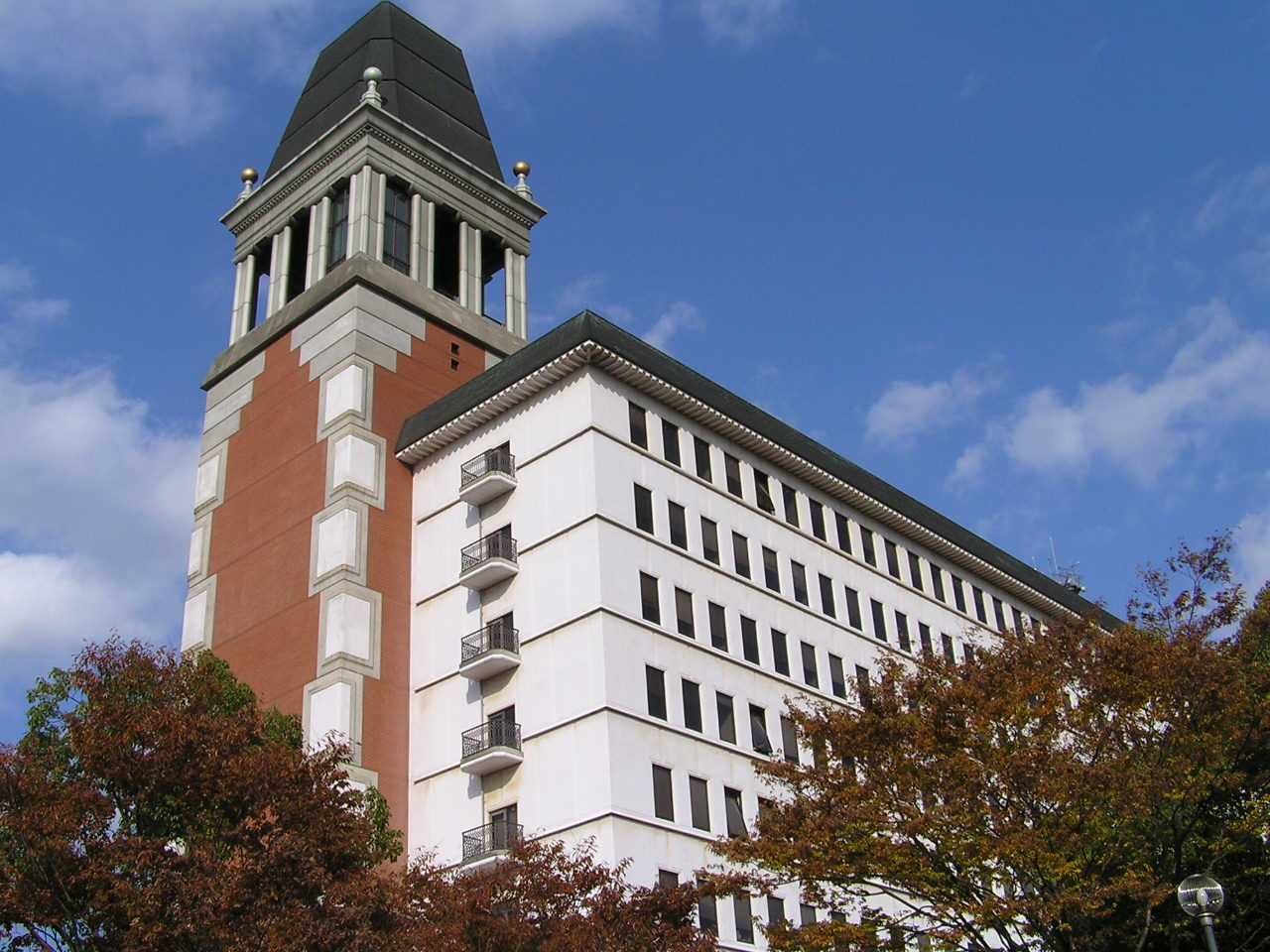
Kurashiki City Hall

Kurashiki (倉敷市, Kurashiki-shi) is a city located in Okayama Prefecture, Japan. As of 31 March 2023, the city had an estimated population of 478,651 and a population density of 1300 persons per km^{2}. The total area of the city is 355.63 square kilometres (137.31 sq mi).

== Geography ==
Kurashiki is located in the south-central part of Okayama Prefecture, and the Takahashi River flows through the midwestern part of the city from north to south and empties into the Seto Inland Sea. Most of the plains are occupied by reclaimed land and alluvial plains, and are relatively flat except for the Kojima area. Kojima, Kameshimayama, Tamashima, and Tsurajima are many places in the city that have the kanji 'island' in their names; these areas were originally islands and were connected by land reclamation to form the current city limits. Okayama City, which is the prefectural capital, is adjacent to the east, and Kurashiki forms part of the Greater Okayama metropolitan area.

=== Adjoining municipalities ===
Okayama Prefecture

- Asakuchi
- Hayashima
- Kita-ku, Okayama
- Minami-ku, Okayama
- Sōja
- Tamano
- Yakage

=== Climate ===
Kurashiki has a humid subtropical climate (Köppen climate classification Cfa). The average annual temperature in Kurashiki is 15.8 °C (60.4 °F). The average annual rainfall is 1,042.2 mm (41.03 in) with September as the wettest month. The temperatures are highest on average in August, at around 27.9 °C (82.2 °F), and lowest in January, at around 4.6 °C (40.3 °F). The highest temperature ever recorded in Kurashiki was 37.6 °C (99.7 °F) on 3 August 2026; the coldest temperature ever recorded was −8.0 °C (17.6 °F) on 27 February 1981.

Climate data for Kurashiki (1991−2020 normals, extremes 1979−present)
Month	Jan	Feb	Mar	Apr	May	Jun	Jul	Aug	Sep	Oct	Nov	Dec	Year
Record high °C (°F)	16.4 (61.5)	22.5 (72.5)	25.7 (78.3)	30.5 (86.9)	32.6 (90.7)	35.2 (95.4)	36.9 (98.4)	37.6 (99.7)	36.2 (97.2)	32.4 (90.3)	26.1 (79.0)	20.6 (69.1)	37.6 (99.7)
Mean daily maximum °C (°F)	9.2 (48.6)	10.0 (50.0)	13.6 (56.5)	19.3 (66.7)	24.4 (75.9)	27.3 (81.1)	30.9 (87.6)	32.2 (90.0)	28.4 (83.1)	23.1 (73.6)	17.1 (62.8)	11.5 (52.7)	20.6 (69.1)
Daily mean °C (°F)	4.6 (40.3)	5.2 (41.4)	8.5 (47.3)	13.9 (57.0)	19.1 (66.4)	22.9 (73.2)	26.9 (80.4)	27.9 (82.2)	23.9 (75.0)	18.0 (64.4)	12.0 (53.6)	6.7 (44.1)	15.8 (60.4)
Mean daily minimum °C (°F)	0.3 (32.5)	0.6 (33.1)	3.5 (38.3)	8.6 (47.5)	14.0 (57.2)	19.1 (66.4)	23.6 (74.5)	24.4 (75.9)	20.1 (68.2)	13.5 (56.3)	7.3 (45.1)	2.4 (36.3)	11.5 (52.6)
Record low °C (°F)	−5.4 (22.3)	−8.0 (17.6)	−3.5 (25.7)	−0.8 (30.6)	3.1 (37.6)	9.8 (49.6)	16.0 (60.8)	17.1 (62.8)	8.9 (48.0)	2.7 (36.9)	−0.9 (30.4)	−4.1 (24.6)	−8.0 (17.6)
Average precipitation mm (inches)	34.4 (1.35)	42.4 (1.67)	78.2 (3.08)	82.5 (3.25)	101.9 (4.01)	149.8 (5.90)	154.1 (6.07)	81.3 (3.20)	133.0 (5.24)	93.6 (3.69)	51.2 (2.02)	40.4 (1.59)	1,042.2 (41.03)
Average precipitation days (≥ 1.0 mm)	4.8	6.1	8.6	9.0	8.8	10.6	9.9	6.8	8.8	7.1	5.8	5.2	91.5
Mean monthly sunshine hours	152.5	144.5	175.7	189.8	199.2	143.1	173.0	206.5	155.2	166.7	149.7	145.8	2,001.3
Source: Japan Meteorological Agency

=== Demographics ===
Per Japanese census data, the population of Kurashiki in 2020 was 474,592 people. Kurashiki has been conducting censuses since 1960.

Historical population
Year	Pop.	±%
1960	286,902	—
1965	308,908	+7.7%
1970	374,385	+21.2%
1975	417,750	+11.6%
1980	432,171	+3.5%
1985	443,721	+2.7%
1990	445,059	+0.3%
1995	453,618	+1.9%
2000	460,869	+1.6%
2005	469,377	+1.8%
2010	475,421	+1.3%
2015	477,118	+0.4%
2020	474,592	−0.5%
Kurashiki population statistics

== History ==
The Kurashiki area is part of ancient Bitchū Province and near the center of the ancient Kingdom of Kibi. Records of human settlements date back to the Japanese Paleolithic period, more than 20,000 years ago, and the city has numerous National Historic Sites from Jōmon period shell middens, Yayoi period settlement remains, Kofun period burial mounds and Nara period temple ruins. From the Heian period, the estuary of the Takahashi River was a port, and the surrounding area was the setting for numerous battles.

During the Edo Period, the area had a complicated administration, with portions held by various feudal domains. The old town of Kurashiki and its port were held directly by the Tokugawa shogunate as tenryō territory and were a collection point for the annual rice taxes. Distinctive white-walled, black-tiled warehouses were built to store goods. The Kurashiki magistrate's office recognized the autonomy of the merchants. It gave preferential treatment to them, increasing the population as well as increasing kokudaka, and local industries included cotton cloth weaving and salt production.

Following the Meiji restoration, the village of Kurashiki was established with the creation of the modern municipalities system on June 1, 1889. It was raised to town status on April 1, 1891, and to city status on April 1, 1928.

On August 1, 2005, the town of Mabi (from Kibi District), and the town of Funao (from Asakuchi District) were merged with Kurashiki.

In 2002, Kurashiki was designated a Core city with increased local autonomy.

== Government ==
Kurashiki has a mayor-council form of government with a directly elected mayor and a unicameral city council of 43 members. Kurashiki contributes 14 members to the Okayama Prefectural Assembly. In terms of national politics, the city is divided between the Okayama 4th district and Okayama 5th district of the lower house of the Diet of Japan.

== Economy ==
Kurashiki is the second largest city in Okayama, and has a mixed economy based on commerce, agriculture, and heavy industry. The Mizushima Rinkai Industrial Area, which spans the Mizushima and Tamashima areas, has factories centered on petrochemicals, steel, automobiles, and shipbuilding, and is one of Japan's leading industrial complexes.

== Education ==
=== Colleges and universities ===
The city is home to several private universities and one public university.

- Kawasaki College of Allied Health Professions
- Kawasaki Medical School
- Kawasaki Medical University
- Kawasaki University of Medical Welfare
- Kurashiki City College (public)
- Kurashiki Sakuyo University
- Kurashiki University of Science and the Arts
- Okayama College

=== Primary and secondary schools ===
Kurashiki has 62 public elementary schools, 26 public junior high schools, and five public high schools operated by the city government. There are ten public high schools operated by the Okayama Prefectural Board of Education, and one combined middle/high school. In addition, there are four private high schools. The prefecture also operates three special education schools for disabled students.

The city has a North Korean school, Okayama Korean Elementary and Junior High School (岡山朝鮮初中級学校).

== Transportation ==
=== Railway ===
JR West (JR West) - San'yō Shinkansen

- Shin-Kurashiki

JR West (JR West) - San'yō Main Line

- Nakashō - Kurashiki - Nishiachi - Shin-Kurashiki

JR West (JR West) - Hakubi Line

- Kurashiki

Mizushima Rinkai Railway - Mizushima Main Line

- Kurashiki-shi - Kyūjōmae - Nishitomii - Fukui - Urada - Yayoi - Sakae - Tokiwa - Mizushima - Mitsubishi-jikō-mae

Ibara Railway Company - Ibara Line

- Kawabejuku - Kibinomakibi - Bitchū-Kurese

=== Highways ===
- San'yō Expressway
- Seto-Chūō Expressway
- National Route 2
- National Route 429
- National Route 430
- National Route 486

== Sister cities ==
Kurashiki maintains the following sister cities:

- Sankt Pölten, Austria, September 29, 1957
- Kansas City, Missouri, United States since May 28, 1972
- Christchurch, New Zealand, March 7, 1973
- Zhenjiang, Jiangsu, China, November 18, 1997

== Local attractions ==
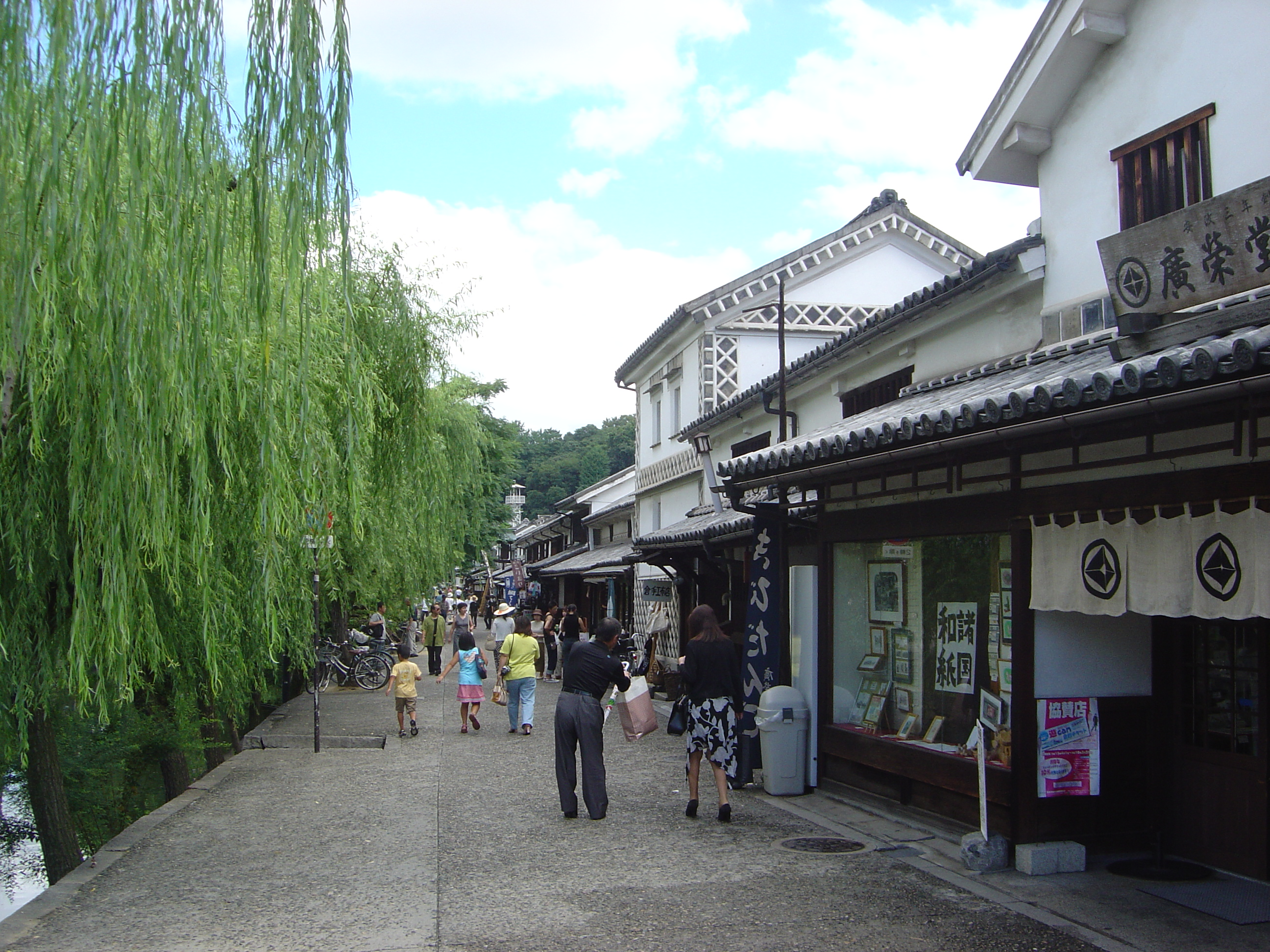
19th-century warehouses in the Bikan district of Kurashiki

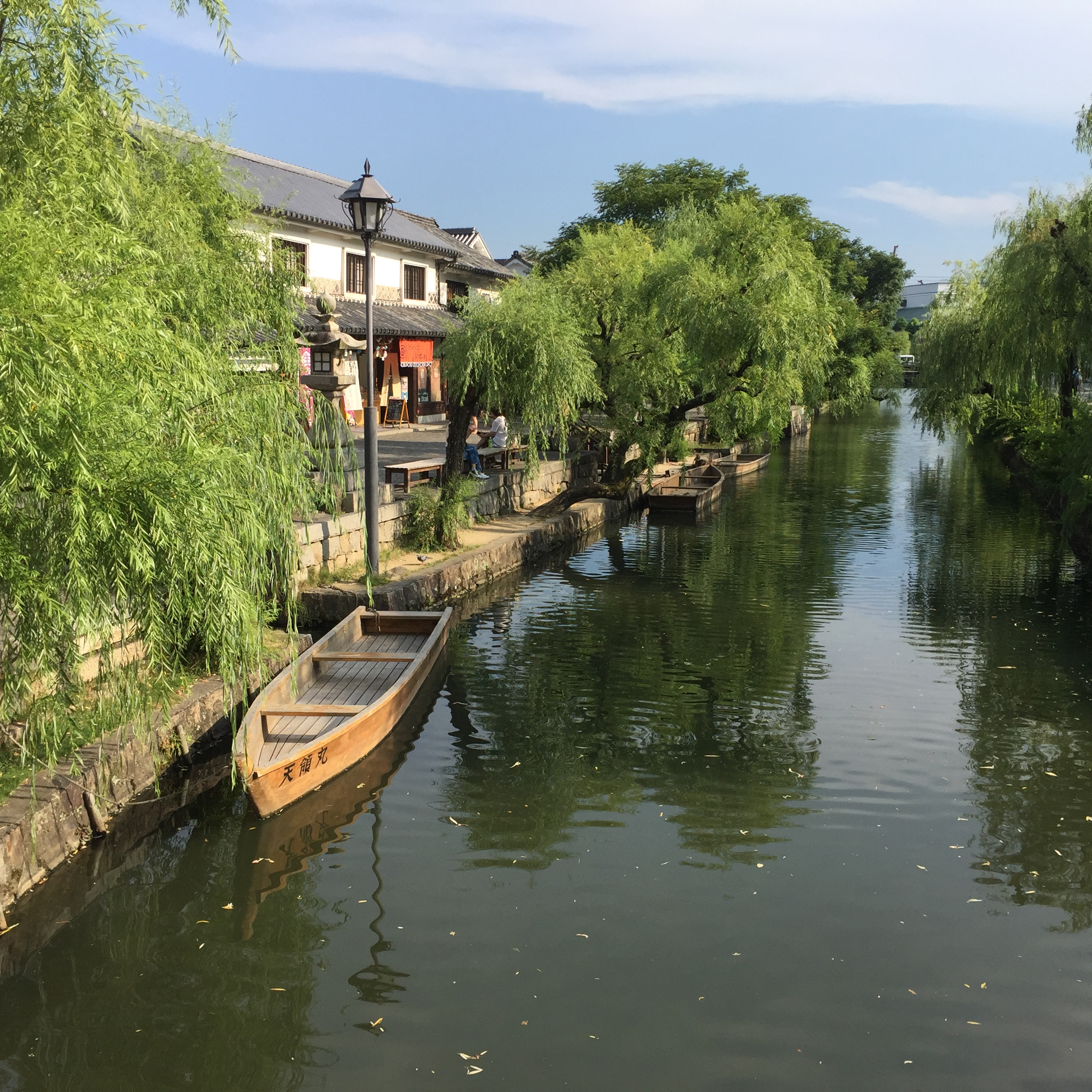
Kurashiki Canal Area

Kurashiki is the home of Japan's first museum for Western art, the Ohara Museum of Art. Established in 1930 by Magosaburō Ōhara, it contains paintings by El Greco, Monet, Matisse, Gauguin, and Renoir. The collection also presents fine examples of Asian and contemporary art. The main building is designed in the style of Neoclassicism.

The old merchant quarter is called the Bikan historical area. It contains many fine examples of 17th-century wooden warehouses (kura, 倉) painted white with traditional black tiles, along a canal framed with weeping willows and filled with koi. The area has no electric poles in order to make it more closely resemble the look of the Meiji period. One of the city's former town halls was located in the Kurashiki Kan, a European-style building constructed in 1917.

In 1997, a theme park called Tivoli (after the park of the same name in Copenhagen) opened near Kurashiki Station. After ten years of operation, it was closed in 2008, with a massive debt.

The Great Seto Bridge connects the city to Sakaide in Kagawa Prefecture across the Inland Sea.

Kenzo Tange, winner of the 1987 Pritzker Prize for architecture, designed the former Kurashiki City Hall in 1960.

=== National Historic Sites ===
- Tatetsuki Site, Yayoi period ruins
- Yata Ōtsuka Kofun, Kofun period tumulus

== Sports ==
Kurashiki has a variety of sports clubs, including a former Japan Football League side Mitsubishi Mizushima.

- JX Nippon Oil & Energy Mizushima F.C. - Soccer
- Kurashiki Oceans - Baseball
- Kurashiki Peach Jacks - Baseball
- Mitsubishi Motors Mizushima FC - Soccer

Kurashiki was also the place where the current J. League sides Vissel Kobe and Fagiano Okayama had their origins before moving.

== Notable people from Kurashiki ==
- Umekichi Hiyama, Japanese female folk rhyme master belonging to the Rakugo Arts Association
- Senichi Hoshino, baseball player
- Keitarou Izawa, a.k.a. Ichiyo Izawa, pianist, frontman of Appa, and former member of Tokyo Jihen
- Hisako Kanemoto, voice actress
- Mikio Kariyama, professional shogi player
- Kibi no Makibi, scholar and noble during the Nara period
- Megumi, actress
- Takashi Nagase, member of Kempeitai during WWII who worked towards reconciliation after the war
- Isamu Nagato, actor
- Magosaburō Ōhara, businessman and philanthropist
- Makiko Ohmoto, voice actress
- Yasuharu Ōyama, shogi player, the 15th Lifetime Meijin
- Daisuke Takahashi, figure skater
- Keiji Tanaka, figure skater
- Joichiro Tatsuyoshi, boxer
- Ahn Young-Hak, Japanese-born North Korean football midfielder
