= Kawasaki University of Medical Welfare =

Coordinates: 34°38′05″N 133°48′40″E

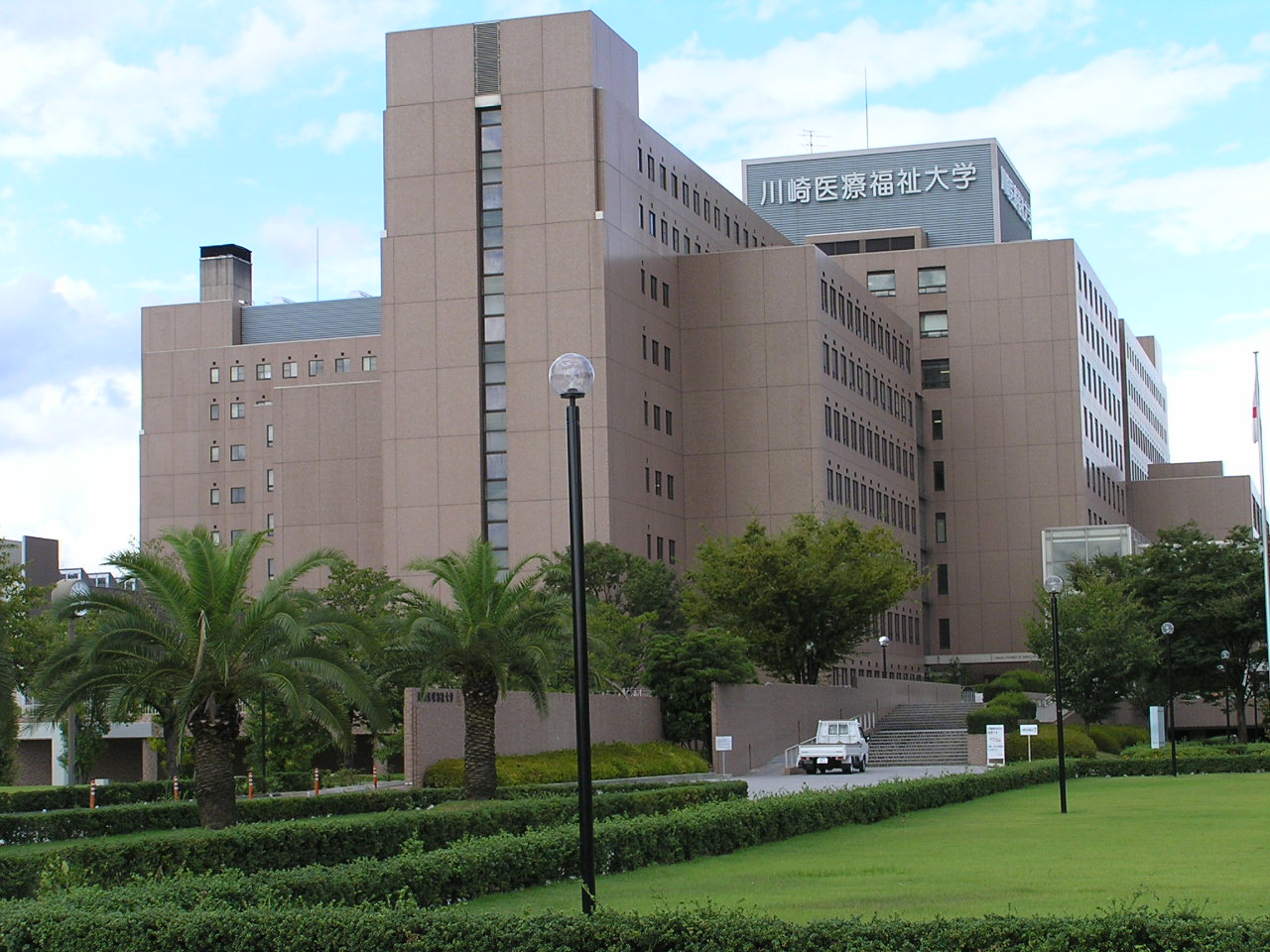
Kawasaki University of Medical Welfare

Kawasaki University of Medical Welfare (川崎医療福祉大学, Kawasaki iryō fukushi daigaku) is a private university in Kurashiki, Okayama, Japan, established in 1991.
