= Asakuchi District, Okayama =

District in Okayama prefecture, Japan

Coordinates: 34.514333°N 133.556094°E

Location of Asakuchi District in Okayama Prefecture

Asakuchi (浅口郡, Asakuchi-gun) is a district located in Okayama Prefecture, Japan.

As of 2003, the district has an estimated population of 55,658 and a density of 621.67 persons per km^{2}. The total area is 89.53 km^{2}.

== Towns and villages ==
- Satoshō

== Merger ==
- On August 1, 2005, the town of Funao became part of the city of Kurashiki.
- On March 21, 2006, the towns of Kamogata, Konkō and Yorishima merged to form the city of Asakuchi.

Therefore, this leaves Satoshō the only member of a "rump" Asakuchi-Gun.
