= Nodajō Station =

Railway station in Shinshiro, Aichi Prefecture, Japan

Nodajō Station 野田城駅
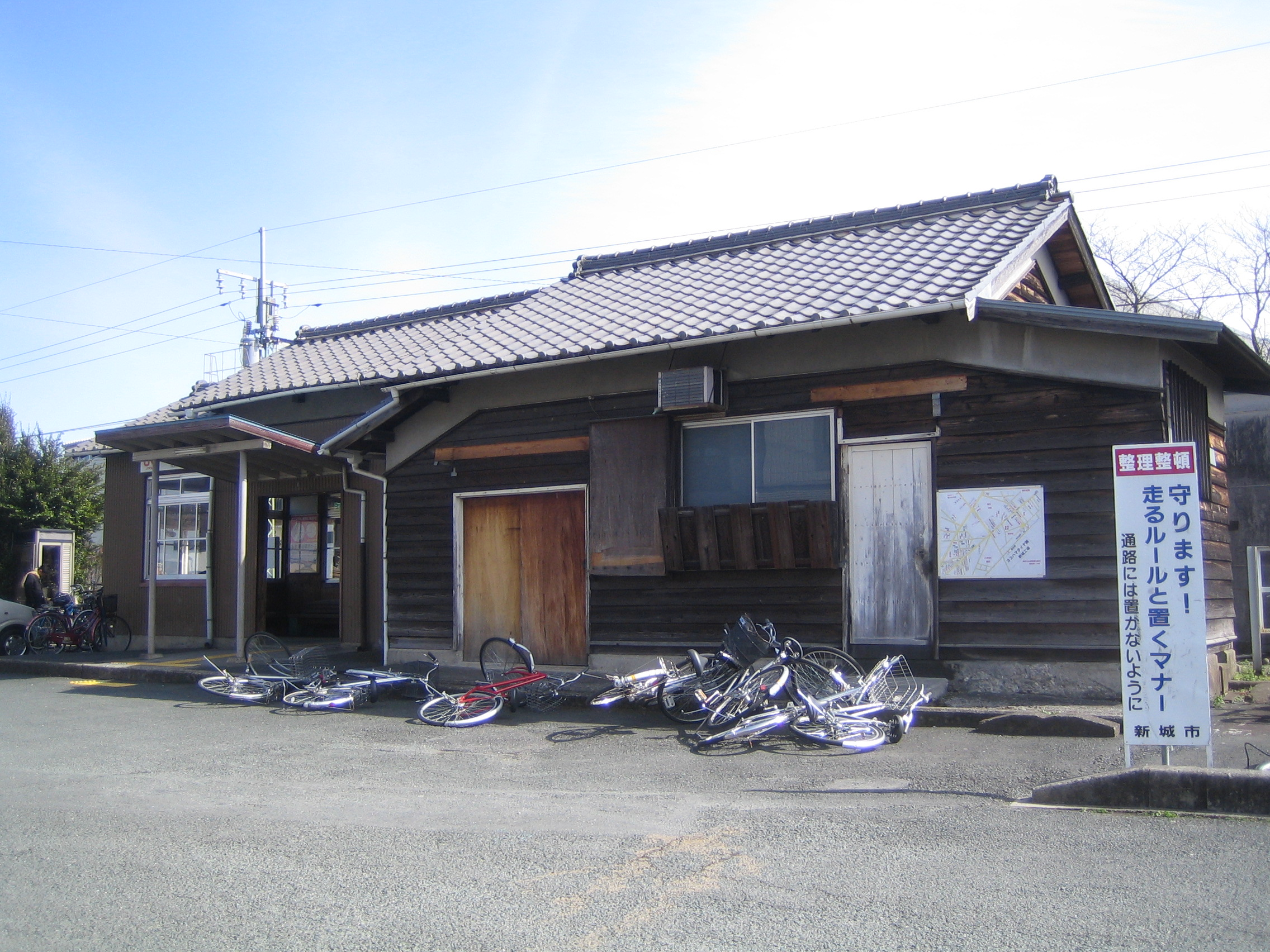
- Nodajō Station in February 2002

General information
- Location: Higashijōetsu-2 Noda, Shinshiro-shi, Aichi-ken 441-1343; Japan
- Coordinates: 34.8886°N 137.4782°E
- Operator: JR Central
- Line: Iida Line
- Distance: 17.9 kilometers from Toyohashi
- Platforms: 2 side platforms

Other information
- Status: Unstaffed

History
- Opened: January 1, 1918

Passengers
- FY1999: 326 daily
Location
- Location within Aichi Prefecture Location within Japan

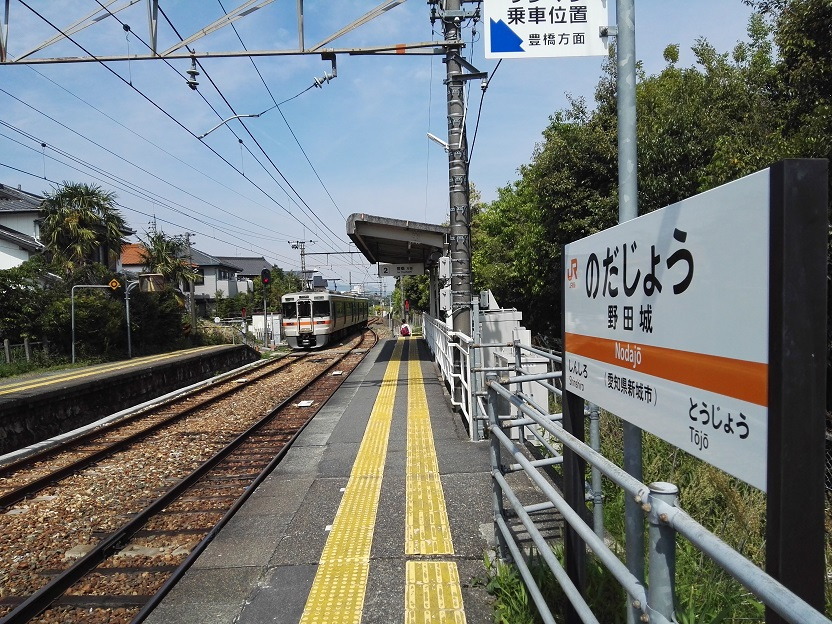
Platform

Nodajō Station (野田城駅, Nodajō-eki) is a railway station in the city of Shinshiro, Aichi Prefecture, Japan, operated by Central Japan Railway Company (JR Tōkai).

== Lines ==
Nodajō Station is served by the Iida Line, and is located 17.9 kilometers from the starting point of the line at Toyohashi Station.

== Station layout ==
The station has two opposed side platforms connected by a level crossing.The station building does not have automated ticket machines, TOICA automated turnstiles are unavailable.

=== Platforms ===
1	■ Iida Line	For Chūbu-Tenryū, Iida
2	■ Iida Line	For Toyohashi

== Adjacent stations ==
«	Service	»
Central Japan Railway Company
Iida Line
Limited Express "Inaji" (特急「伊那路」): Does not stop at this station
Tōjō	Local (普通)	Shinshiro

== Station history ==
Nodajō Station was established on January 1, 1918 as a station on the now-defunct Toyokawa Railway (豊川鉄道, Toyokawa Tetsudō). It was named after Noda Castle, the site of an important siege in 1573, during the Sengoku period. On August 1, 1943, the Toyokawa Railway were nationalized along with some other local lines to form the Japanese Government Railways (JGR) Iida Line. Scheduled freight operations were discontinued in 1971. The station has been unattended since February 1984. Along with its division and privatization of JNR on April 1, 1987, the station came under the control and operation of the Central Japan Railway Company (JR Tōkai)

== Surrounding area ==
- Yokohama Rubber Shinshiro plant
- Noda Castle ruins

== See also ==
- List of railway stations in Japan
