= 大海 =

大海, meaning "big sea" or "ocean", may refer to:

- Ōmi Station (Aichi), Iida Line station in Shinshiro, Aichi Prefecture, Japan
- Taikai, style of karamono chaire
- Album by Taiwan pop singer Chang Yu-sheng

People with the given name 大海 include:

- Hu Dahai, Ming Dynasty general of China
- Kwok Dai-hoi, character in Hidden Treasures (TV series)
- Tong Dai-hoi, character in The Brink of Law
