= Aichi Shinshiro Otani University =

University in Aichi Prefecture, Japan

- 愛知新城大谷大学
- Type: Private
- Active: 1999–2013
- Location: Shinshiro, Aichi, Japan; 34.9136°N 137.5345°E
- Website: www.owari.ac.jp/shinshiro/index.htm (in Japanese)

Aichi Shinshiro Otani University (愛知新城大谷大学, Aichi shinshiro ōtani daigaku) was a private university in Shinshiro, Aichi, Japan. The predecessor of the school, a junior college, was founded in 1999. It became a four-year college in 2004. It stopped accepting new students in 2010 and was closed in 2013 due to financial problems.

== Access ==
The school was accessible by bus or train, via Mikawa-Tōgō Station on the Iida Line.
