= Chausuyama =

Chausuyama may refer to:

- Chausuyama (Aichi), a mountain on the border between Aichi and Nagano Prefectures, Japan
- Chausuyama Station, a railway station in Shinshiro, Aichi Prefecture, Japan
