= Ōmi Station =

Ōmi Station is the name of two train stations in Japan:

1. Ōmi Station (Aichi) (大海駅)
2. Ōmi Station (Niigata) (青海駅)
