= Tōjō Station =

Tōjō Station is the name of two train stations in Japan:

- Tōjō Station (Aichi) (東上駅)
- Tōjō Station (Hiroshima) (東城駅)
