= Suganuma =

Suganuma (Japanese: 菅沼) is a Japanese surname. Notable people with the surname include:

- Eiji Suganuma (菅沼 栄治), male Japanese animation director
- Hisayoshi Suganuma (菅沼 久義, born 1978), Japanese male voice actor
- Michiko Suganuma (菅沼 三千子, born 1940), Kamakura-bori artist from Japan
- Minoru Suganuma (菅沼 実, born 1985), Japanese football player
- Morito Suganuma (菅沼 守人, born 1942), Japanese aikido teacher holding the rank of 8th dan in the Aikikai
- Suganuma Sadamichi (菅沼 貞道), samurai commander in Japan's Sengoku period
- Suganuma Sadamitsu (菅沼 定盈, 1542–1604), samurai commander of the Suganuma clan during Japan's Sengoku period
