= Suganuma Sadamitsu =

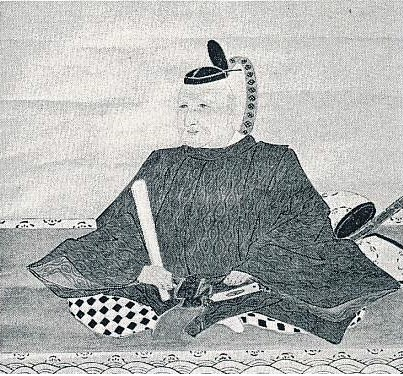
Suganuma Sadamitsu

Suganuma Sadamitsu (菅沼 定盈) (1542–1604) was a samurai commander of the Suganuma clan during Japan's Sengoku period. Originally serving under the Imagawa clan, until the year of 1560, Sadamitsu then entered the service of the Tokugawa. After years of loyal service to Tokugawa Ieyasu in battles such as Anegawa and Nagashino, in 1601 he was granted a 20,000-koku fief in Nagashima in Ise province.

It is not fully clear whether Sadamitsu is the same person as Suganuma Sadamichi who lived around the same time.
