= Torii Station (Aichi) =

Railway station in Shinshiro, Aichi Prefecture, Japan

Torii Station 鳥居駅
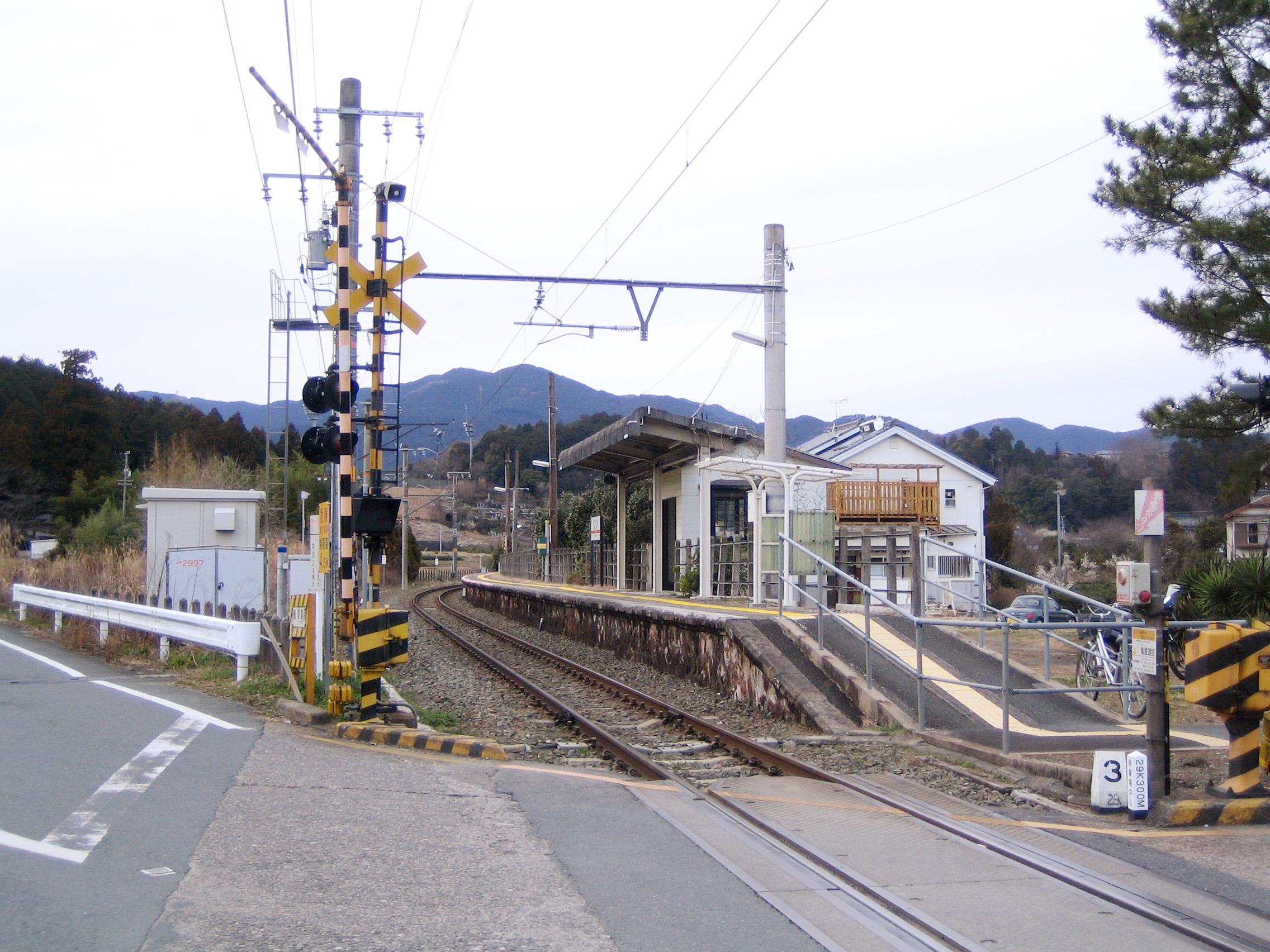
- Torii Station in February 2007

General information
- Location: Minamida-49 Ōmi, Shinshiro-shi, Aichi-ken 441-1315; Japan
- Coordinates: 34°55′14.37″N 137°33′6.30″E
- Operator: JR Central
- Line: Iida Line
- Distance: 29.3 kilometers from Toyohashi
- Platforms: 1 side platform

Other information
- Status: Unstaffed

History
- Opened: February 1, 1923

Passengers
- FY1999: 63 daily
Location
- Location within Aichi Prefecture Location within Japan

Torii Station (Japanese: 鳥居駅, Torii-eki) is a railway station in the city of Shinshiro, Aichi, Japan, operated by Central Japan Railway Company (JR Tōkai).

== Lines ==
Torii Station is served by the Iida Line, and is located 29.3 kilometers from the starting point of the line at Toyohashi Station.

== Station layout ==
The station has a single side platform serving one bidirectional track The station building has automated ticket machines, TOICA automated turnstiles and is unattended.

== Adjacent stations ==
«	Service	»
Central Japan Railway Company
Iida Line
Limited Express "Inaji" (特急「伊那路」): Does not stop at this station
Ōmi	Local (普通)	Nagashinojō

== Station history ==
Torii Station was established on February 1, 1923, as a station on the now-defunct Hōraiji Railway (鳳来寺鉄道, Hōraiji Tetsudō). The station was named Torii because it is adjacent to the reported death place of Torii Suneemon, a samurai famed for his bravery and death by execution during the siege of Nagashino Castle (Battle of Nagashino) in 1575. The ruin of Nagashino Castle is adjacent to the neighboring Nagashinojō Station.

On August 1, 1943, the Hōraiji Railway was nationalized along with some other local lines to form the Japanese Government Railways (JGR) Iida Line and the station was renamed to its present name. Scheduled freight operations were discontinued in 1962. The station has been unattended since 1971. Along with its division and privatization of JNR on April 1, 1987, the station came under the control and operation of the Central Japan Railway Company. A new station building was completed in 1996.

== Surrounding area ==
- Japan National Route 151

== See also ==
- List of railway stations in Japan
