= Shinshiro =

Shinshiro 新城市
- City
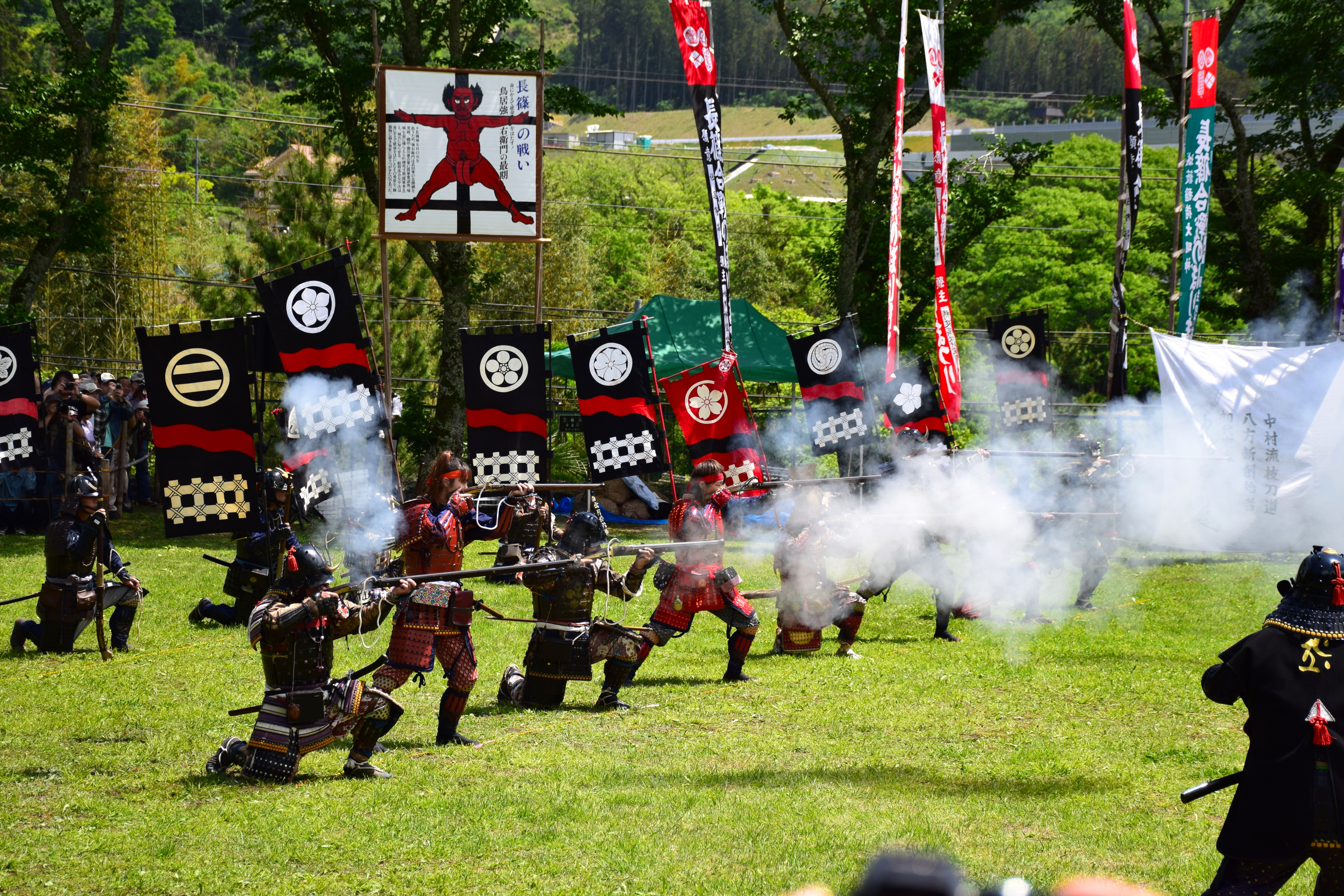
- Battle of Nagashino Festival

- Flag Seal

- Location of Shinshiro in Aichi Prefecture

- Coordinates: 34°53′56.18″N 137°29′51.79″E
- Country: Japan
- Region: Chūbu (Tōkai)
- Prefecture: Aichi

Government
  - Mayor: Hiroyuki Shimoe (since November 2021)

Area
  - Total: 499.23 km^{2} (192.75 sq mi)

Population (October 1, 2019)
  - Total: 44,581
  - Density: 89.300/km^{2} (231.28/sq mi)
- Time zone: UTC+9 (Japan Standard Time)
- Phone number: 0536-23-1111
- Address: 115 Higashiirifune, Shinshiro, Aichi Prefecture 〒 441-1392
- Climate: Cfa
- Website: Official website
- Symbols
- Bird: Eurasian scops-owl
- Flower: Lilium auratum
- Tree: Prunus serrulata

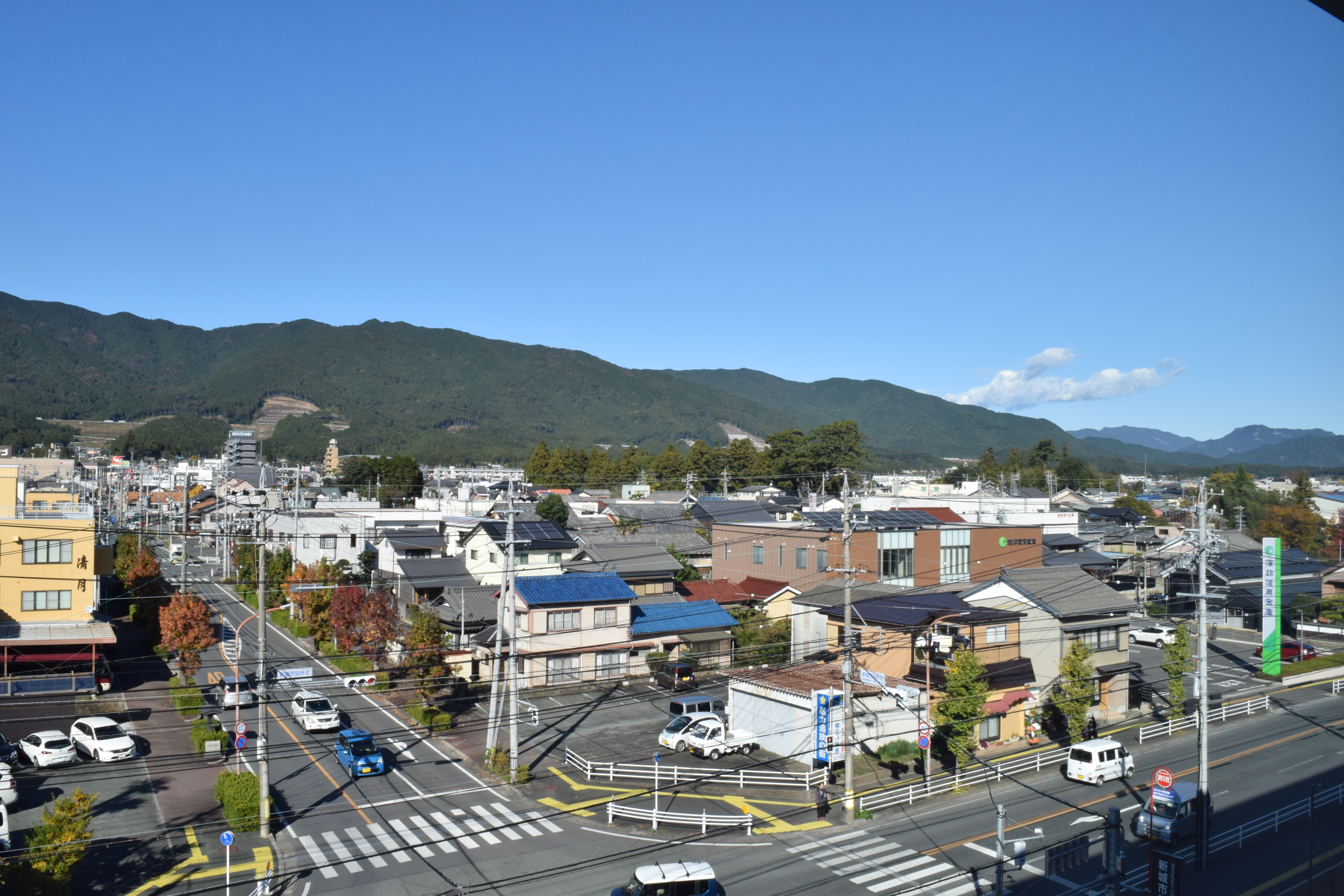
Downtown of Shinshiro city

Shinshiro (新城市, Shinshiro-shi) is a city located in Aichi Prefecture, Japan. As of 1 October 2019, the city had an estimated population of 44,581 in 17,691 households, and a population density of 89.3 persons per km^{2}. The total area of the city is 499.23 square kilometres (192.75 sq mi).

== Geography ==
Shinshiro is located in east-central Aichi Prefecture. Much of the northern and eastern portion of the city area is covered in mountains and forest, and most is within the borders of the Aichi Kōgen Quasi-National Park

=== Climate ===
The city has a climate characterized by hot and humid summers, and relatively mild winters (Köppen climate classification Cfa). The average annual temperature in Shinshiro is 15.4 °C (59.7 °F). The average annual rainfall is 2,085.5 mm (82.11 in) with July as the wettest month. The temperatures are highest on average in August, at around 26.6 °C (79.9 °F), and lowest in January, at around 4.4 °C (39.9 °F).

Climate data for Shinshiro (2003−2020 normals, extremes 2002−present)
Month	Jan	Feb	Mar	Apr	May	Jun	Jul	Aug	Sep	Oct	Nov	Dec	Year
Record high °C (°F)	18.3 (64.9)	21.5 (70.7)	25.2 (77.4)	29.6 (85.3)	33.1 (91.6)	36.0 (96.8)	39.6 (103.3)	38.4 (101.1)	36.5 (97.7)	32.7 (90.9)	26.4 (79.5)	23.1 (73.6)	39.6 (103.3)
Mean daily maximum °C (°F)	10.0 (50.0)	11.5 (52.7)	14.8 (58.6)	19.7 (67.5)	24.4 (75.9)	27.0 (80.6)	30.2 (86.4)	32.0 (89.6)	28.8 (83.8)	23.6 (74.5)	18.2 (64.8)	12.4 (54.3)	21.1 (69.9)
Daily mean °C (°F)	4.4 (39.9)	5.8 (42.4)	8.8 (47.8)	13.6 (56.5)	18.3 (64.9)	21.8 (71.2)	25.4 (77.7)	26.6 (79.9)	23.4 (74.1)	17.9 (64.2)	12.1 (53.8)	6.7 (44.1)	15.4 (59.7)
Mean daily minimum °C (°F)	−0.9 (30.4)	0.4 (32.7)	2.8 (37.0)	7.6 (45.7)	12.7 (54.9)	17.7 (63.9)	21.7 (71.1)	22.5 (72.5)	19.3 (66.7)	13.4 (56.1)	7.1 (44.8)	1.6 (34.9)	10.5 (50.9)
Record low °C (°F)	−8.2 (17.2)	−8.5 (16.7)	−4.1 (24.6)	−2.8 (27.0)	3.0 (37.4)	10.2 (50.4)	17.0 (62.6)	17.3 (63.1)	11.3 (52.3)	3.7 (38.7)	−2.0 (28.4)	−5.6 (21.9)	−8.5 (16.7)
Average precipitation mm (inches)	51.6 (2.03)	100.7 (3.96)	167.0 (6.57)	192.0 (7.56)	220.3 (8.67)	229.6 (9.04)	299.6 (11.80)	186.0 (7.32)	255.3 (10.05)	221.0 (8.70)	96.3 (3.79)	66.1 (2.60)	2,085.5 (82.11)
Average precipitation days (≥ 1.0 mm)	5.3	7.1	9.0	9.7	9.8	12.4	13.1	9.9	11.2	10.6	7.6	5.9	111.6
Mean monthly sunshine hours	191.1	176.5	205.2	202.8	210.0	145.3	161.4	204.9	162.4	163.2	170.3	178.6	2,171.7
Source: Japan Meteorological Agency

=== Demographics ===
Per Japanese census data, the population of Shinshiro has started to decline rapidly over the past 20 years.

Historical population
Year	Pop.	±%
1960	59,891	—
1970	54,042	−9.8%
1980	54,239	+0.4%
1990	54,583	+0.6%
2000	53,603	−1.8%
2010	49,871	−7.0%

=== Neighboring municipalities ===
Aichi Prefecture

- Toyohashi
- Okazaki
- Toyokawa
- Toyota
- Kitashitara District, Tōei
- Kitashitara District, Shitara

Shizuoka Prefecture

- Hamamatsu (Hamana-ku, Tenryū-ku)

== History ==
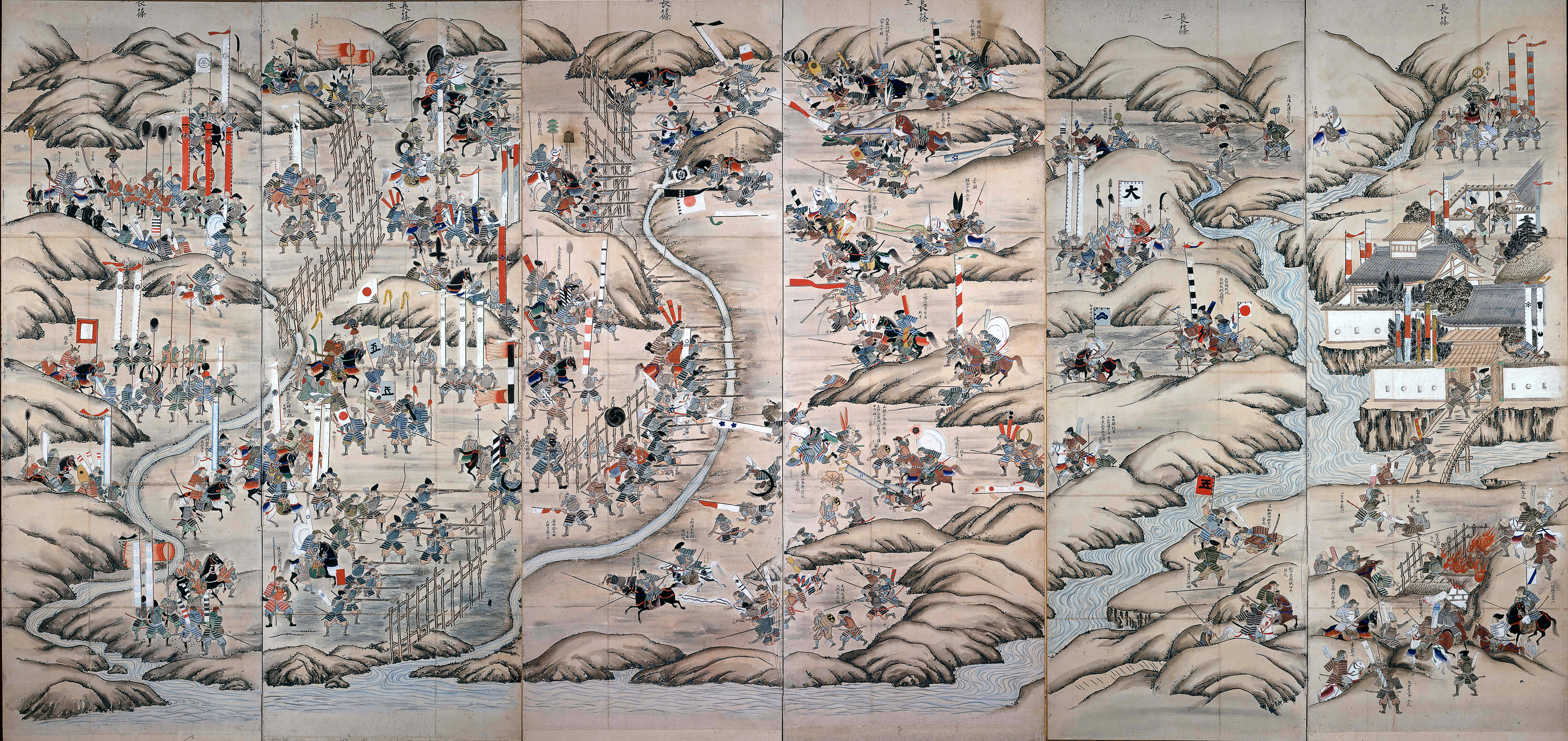
Battle of Nagashino in 1575

=== Feudal period ===
The area of present-day Shinshiro was part of the territories of the Okudaira clan, the predecessors of the Matsudaira clan and Tokugawa clan during the Sengoku period. Their stronghold, Nagashino Castle in what is now the northern part of Shinshiro, was the site of the Battle of Nagashino, between the forces of Oda Nobunaga and the Takeda clan.

Noda Castle, at which Takeda Shingen was wounded at the Siege of Noda was also located within the borders of Shinshiro.

=== Early modern period ===
During the Edo period, most of the area was tenryō territory ruled directly by the Tokugawa shogunate through hatamoto administrators.

=== Late modern period ===
After the start of the Meiji period, Shinshiro Town in Minamishitara District, Aichi Prefecture was proclaimed on 1 October 1889 with the establishment of the modern municipalities system.

=== Contemporary history ===
The area of the town expanded through annexation of neighboring villages in 1955 and 1956. The city of Shinshiro was proclaimed on 1 November 1958.

On 1 October 2005, the town of Hōrai, and the village of Tsukude (both from Minamishitara District) were merged into Shinshiro. The city of Shinshiro now covers all of former Minamishitara District.

== Government ==
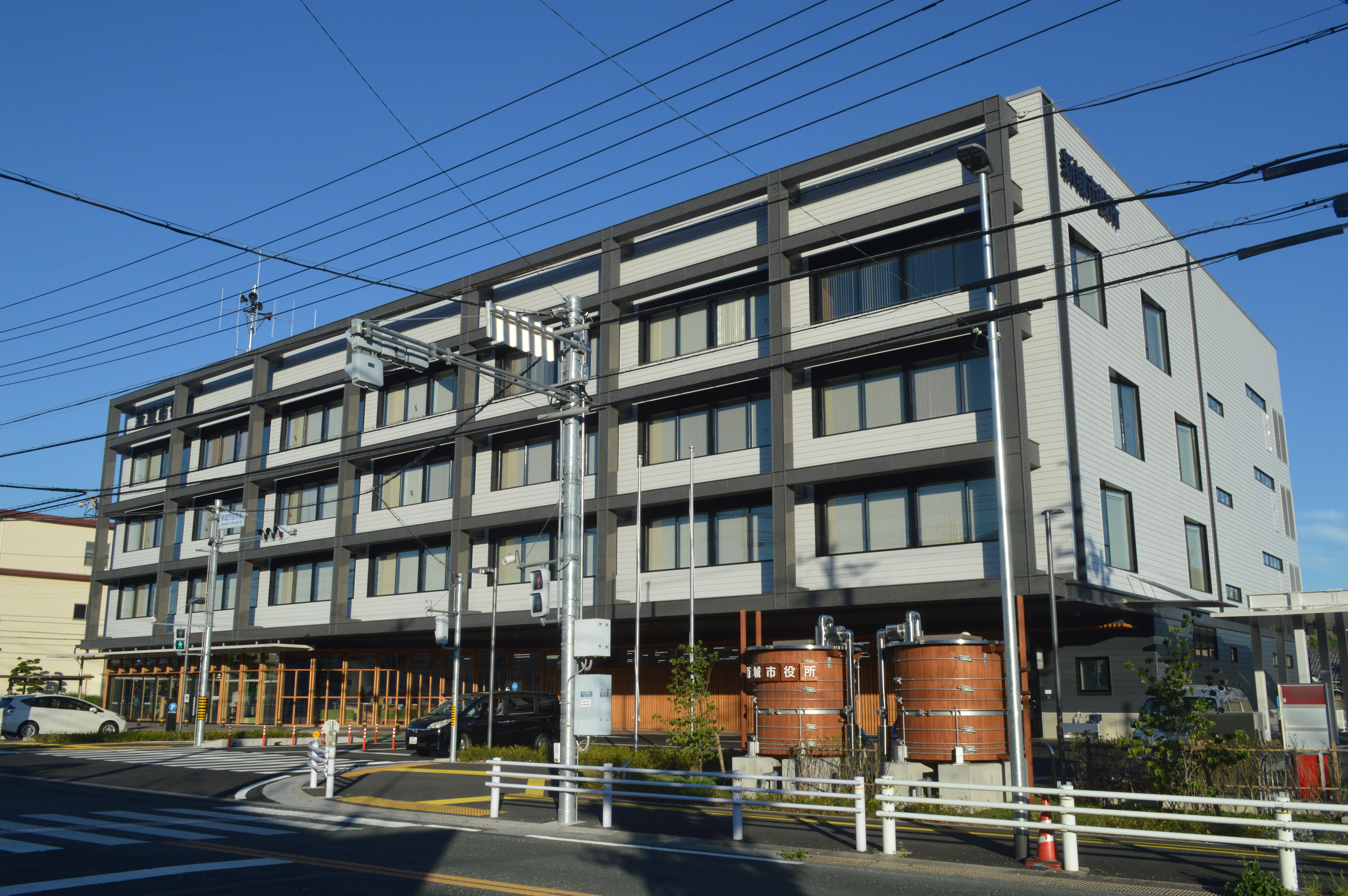
Shinshiro city hall

Shinshiro has a mayor-council form of government with a directly elected mayor and a unicameral city legislature of 18 members. The city contributes one member to the Aichi Prefectural Assembly. In terms of national politics, the city is part of Aichi District 14 of the lower house of the Diet of Japan.

== Economy ==
=== Primary sector of the economy ===
==== Agriculture ====
Shinshiro is a regional commercial center, with the economy concentrated on agriculture, especially chicken farming, and light manufacturing.

== Education ==
=== University ===
- Aichi Shinshiro Otani University (closed in 2013)

=== Schools ===
Shinshiro has 13 public elementary schools and six public junior high schools operated by the city government, and one public high school operated by the Aichi Prefectural Board of Education. There is also one private high school.

== Transportation ==
=== Railways ===
==== Conventional lines ====
Central Japan Railway Company

- Iida Line: - Nodajō - Shinshiro - Higashi-Shimmachi - Chausuyama - Mikawa-Tōgō - Ōmi - Torii - Nagashinojō - Hon-Nagashino - Mikawa-Ōno - Yuya-Onsen - Mikawa-Makihara - Kakidaira - Mikawa-Kawai - Ikeba -

=== Roads ===
==== Expressways ====
- Tōmei Expressway
- New Tōmei Expressway

==== Japan National Route ====
- National Route 151
- National Route 257
- National Route 301
- National Route 420

== International relations ==
Shinshiro is a member of "Newcastles of the World", an alliance which brings together seventeen cities whose names mean "new castle".

== Local attractions ==
- Atera Seven Falls
- Fuka-ji
- Hōraisan Tōshō-gū shrine
- Hōrai-ji
- Site of Nagashino Castle
- Narusawa Waterfall
- Site of Noda Castle
- Sakurabuchi Park
- Thousand Rice Paddies of Yotsuya (Yotsuya Senmaida)
- Yuya Onsen
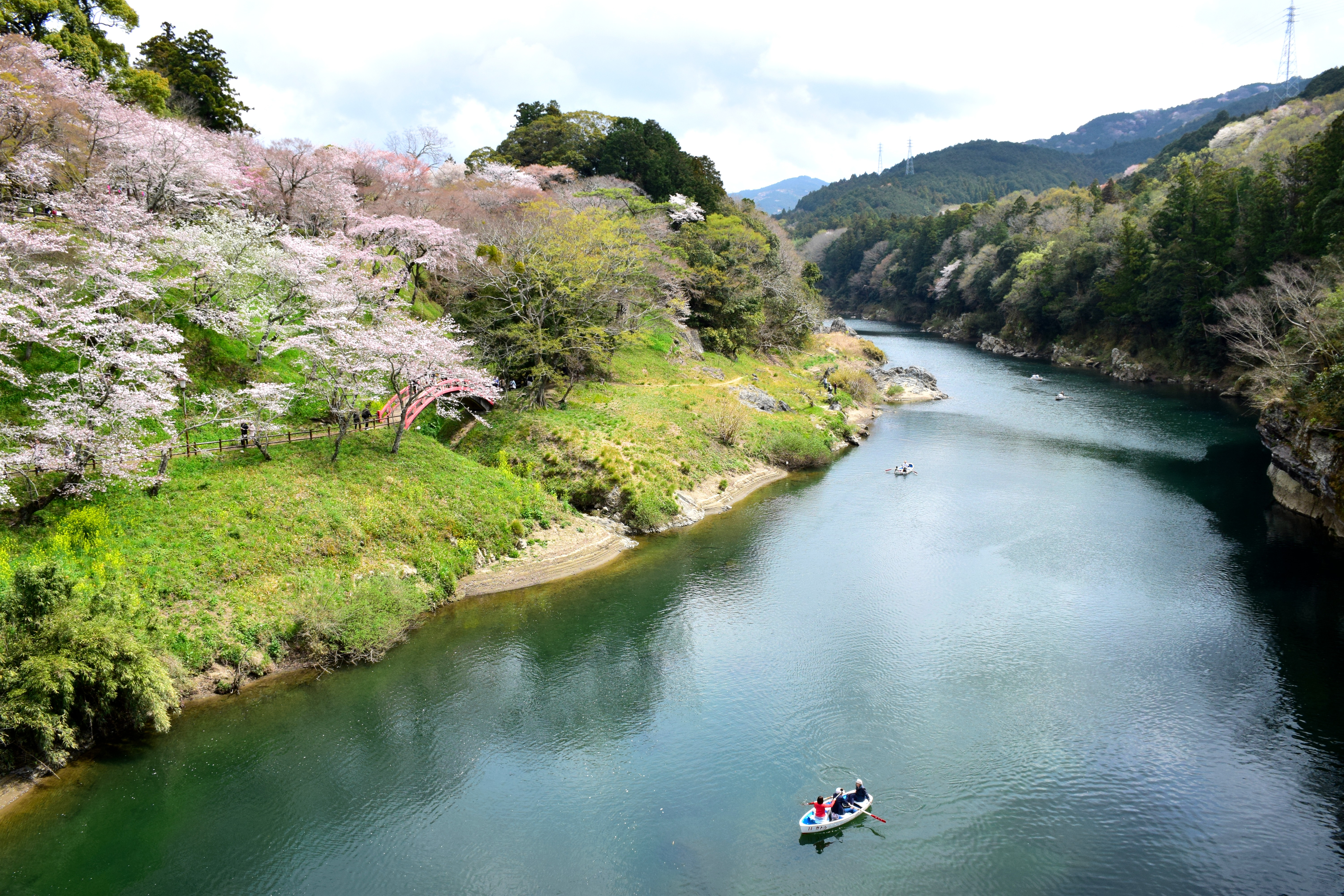
Sakurabuchi Park

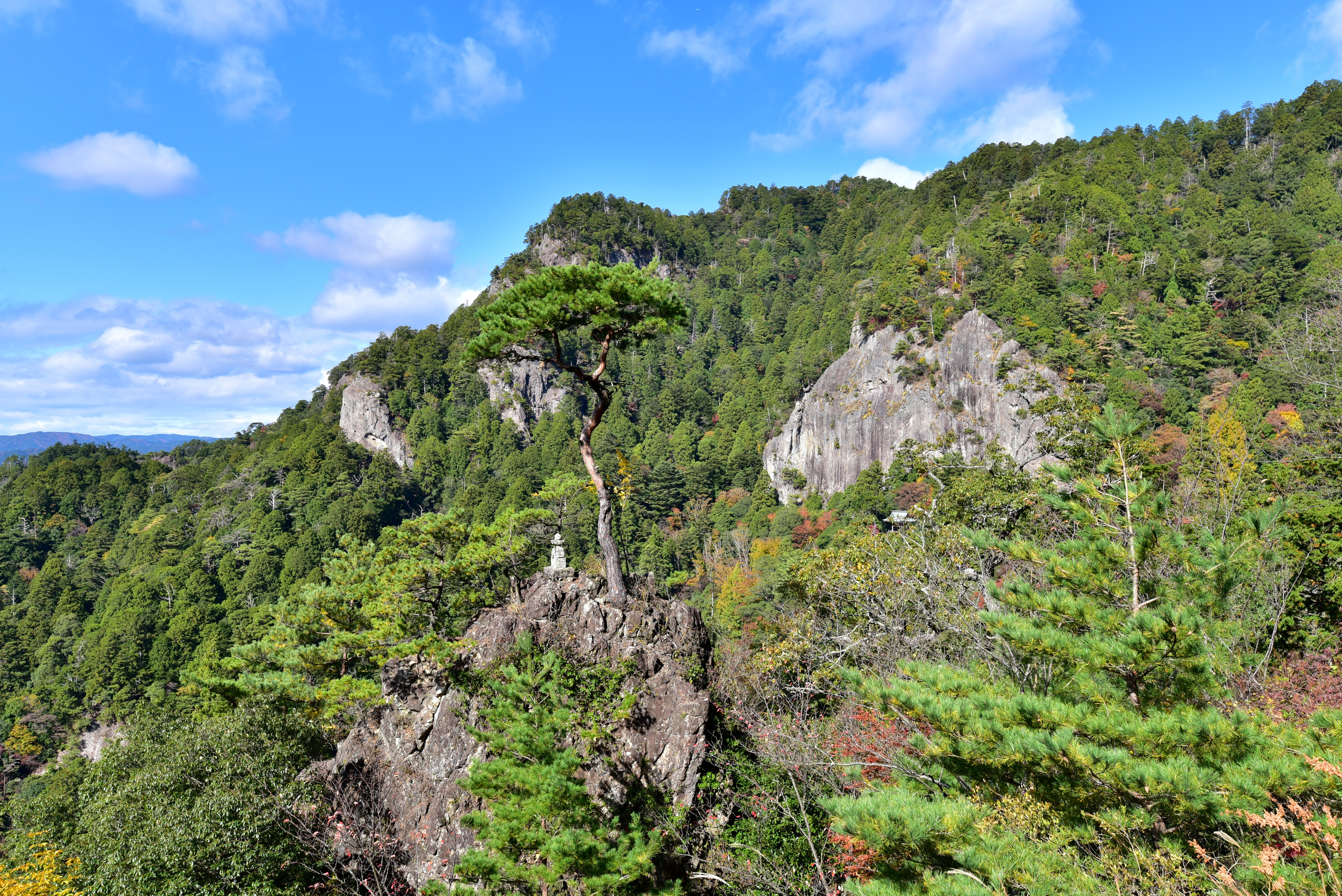
Mount Hōraiji

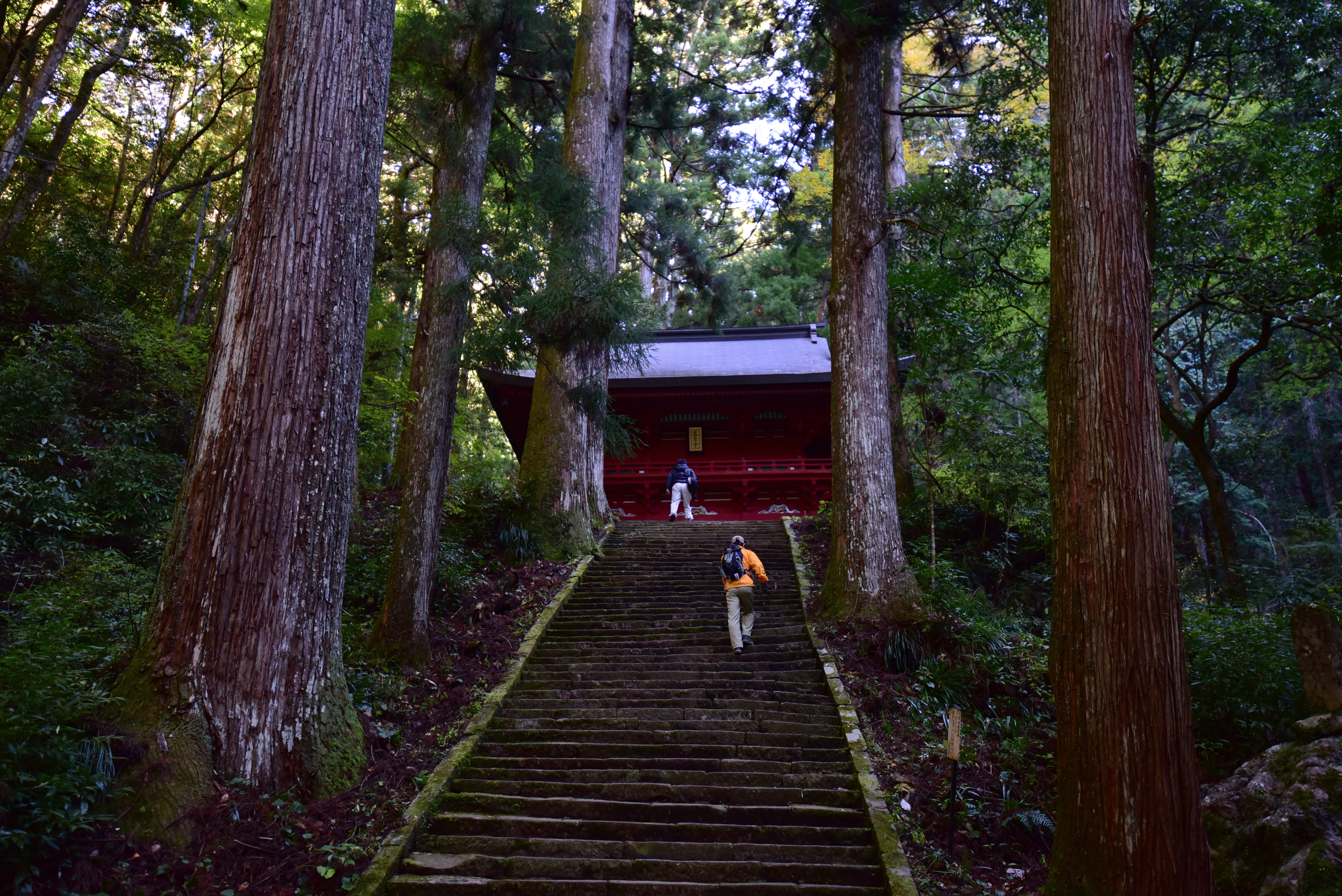
Mount Hōraiji (Niōmon)

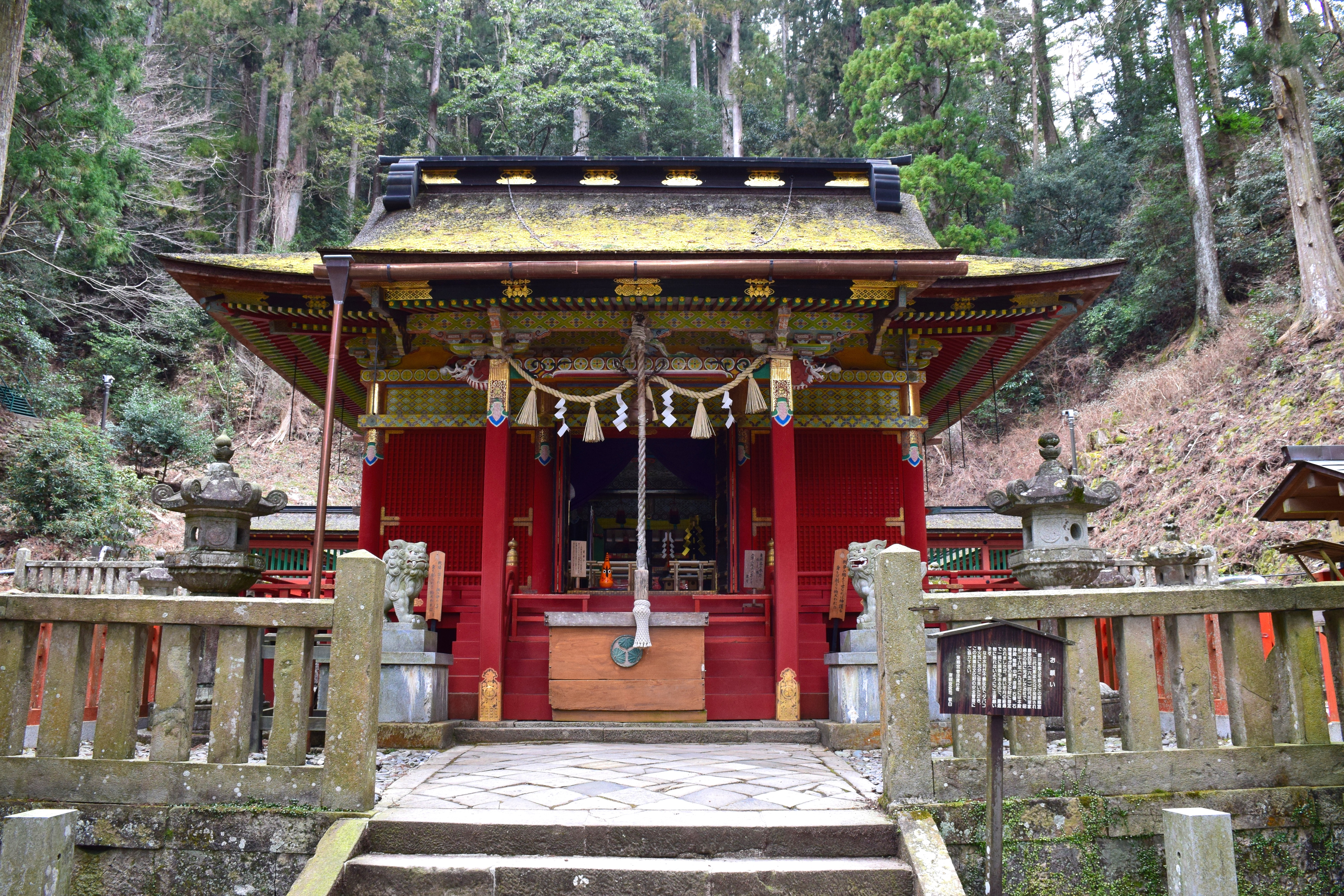
Hōraisan Tōshō-gū

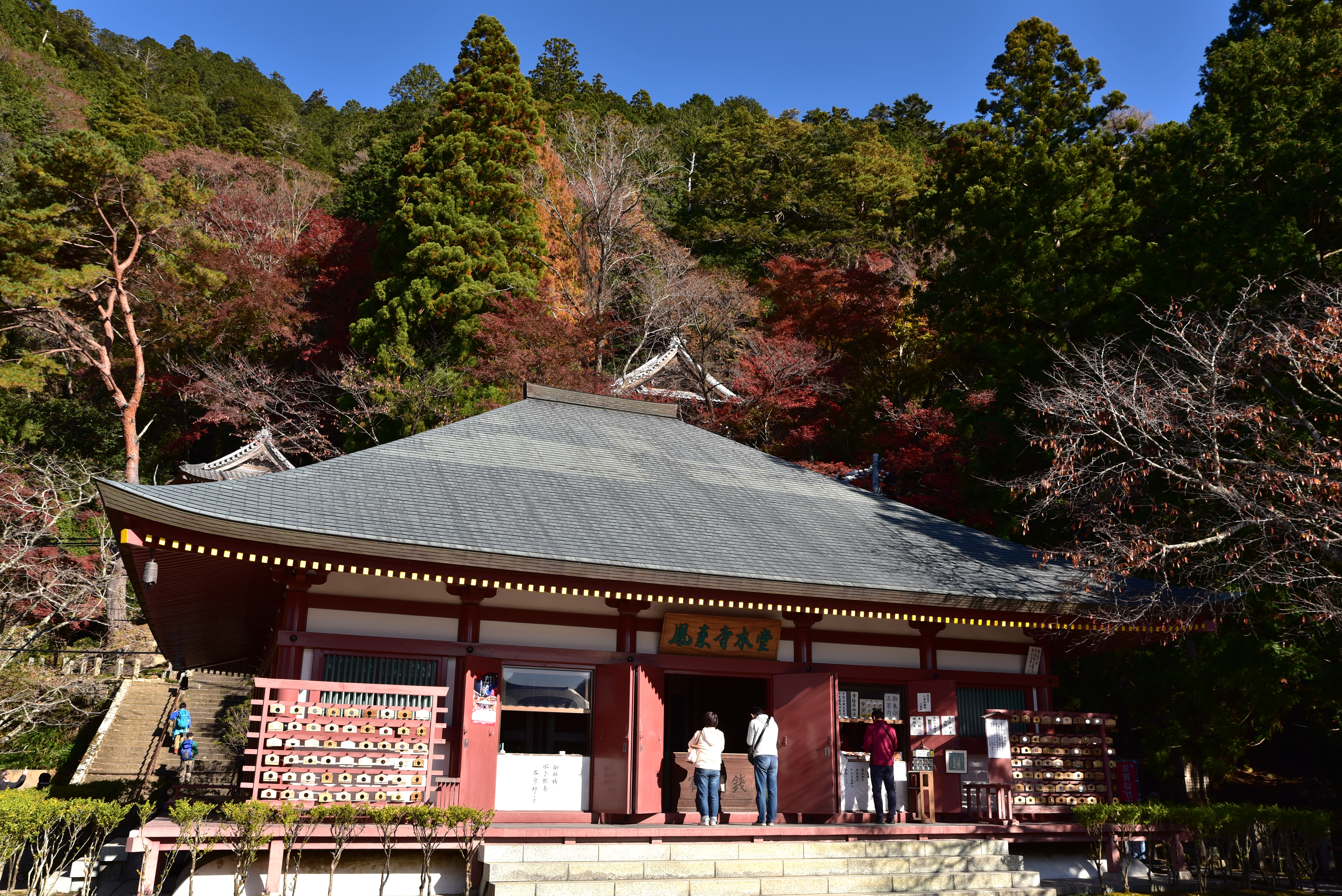
Hōrai-ji

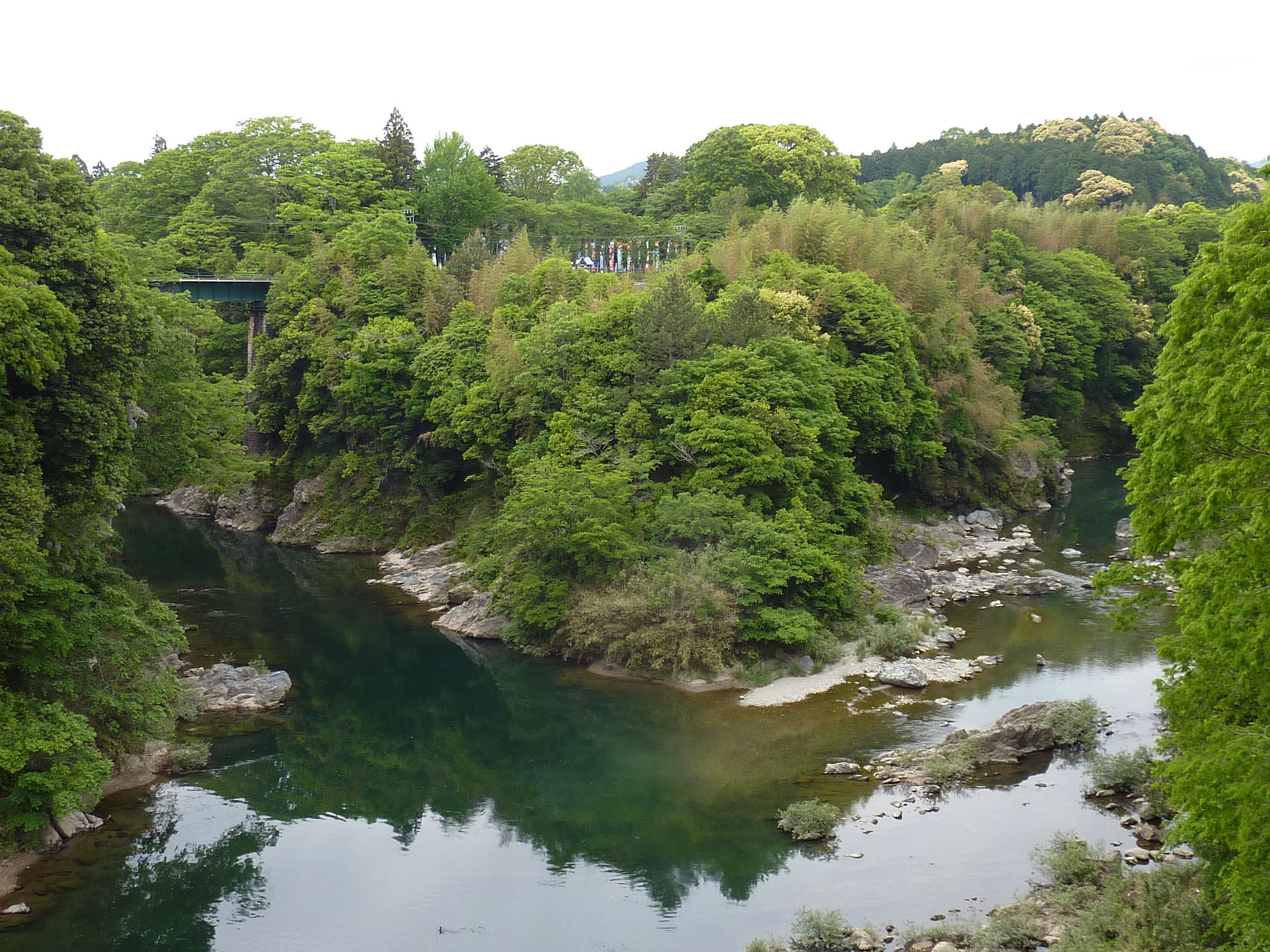
Site of former Nagashino Castle

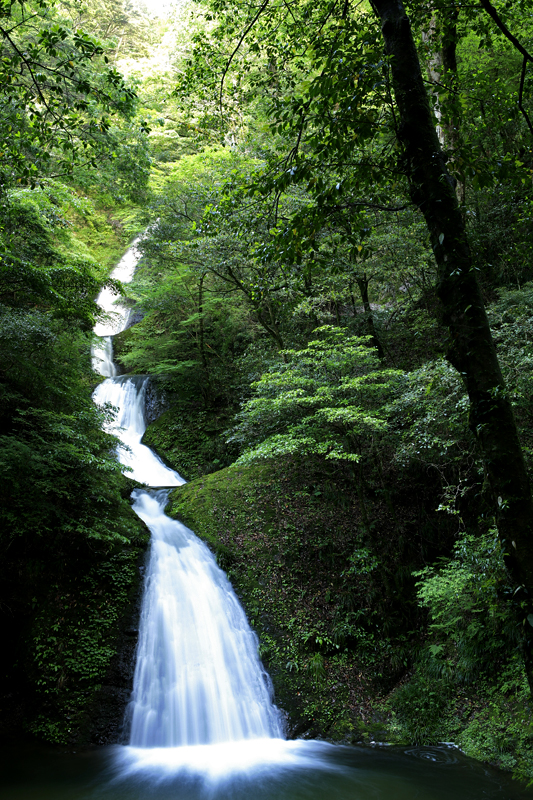
Atera Seven Falls

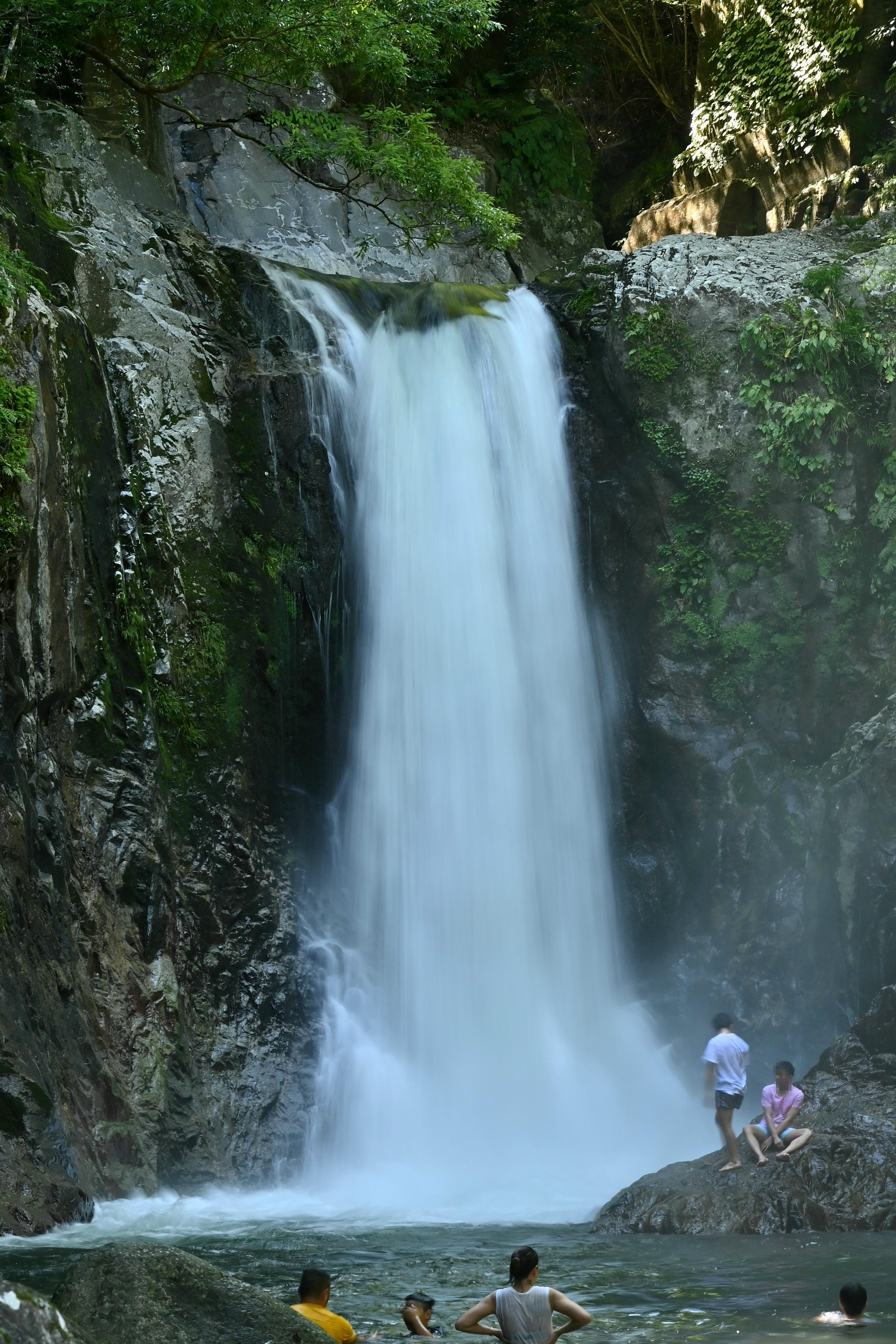
Narusawa Waterfall

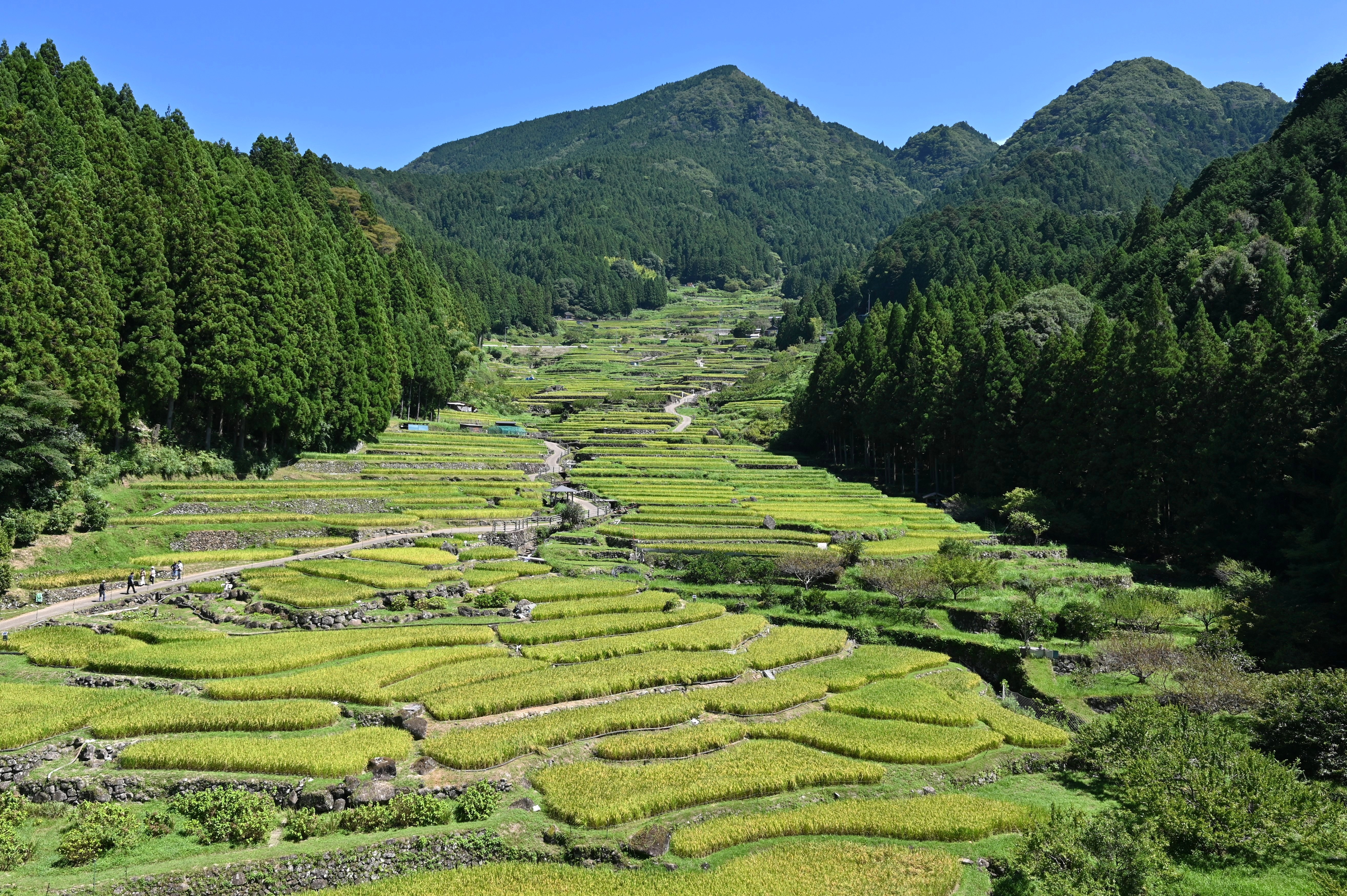
Thousand Rice Paddies of Yotsuya (Yotsuya Senmaida)

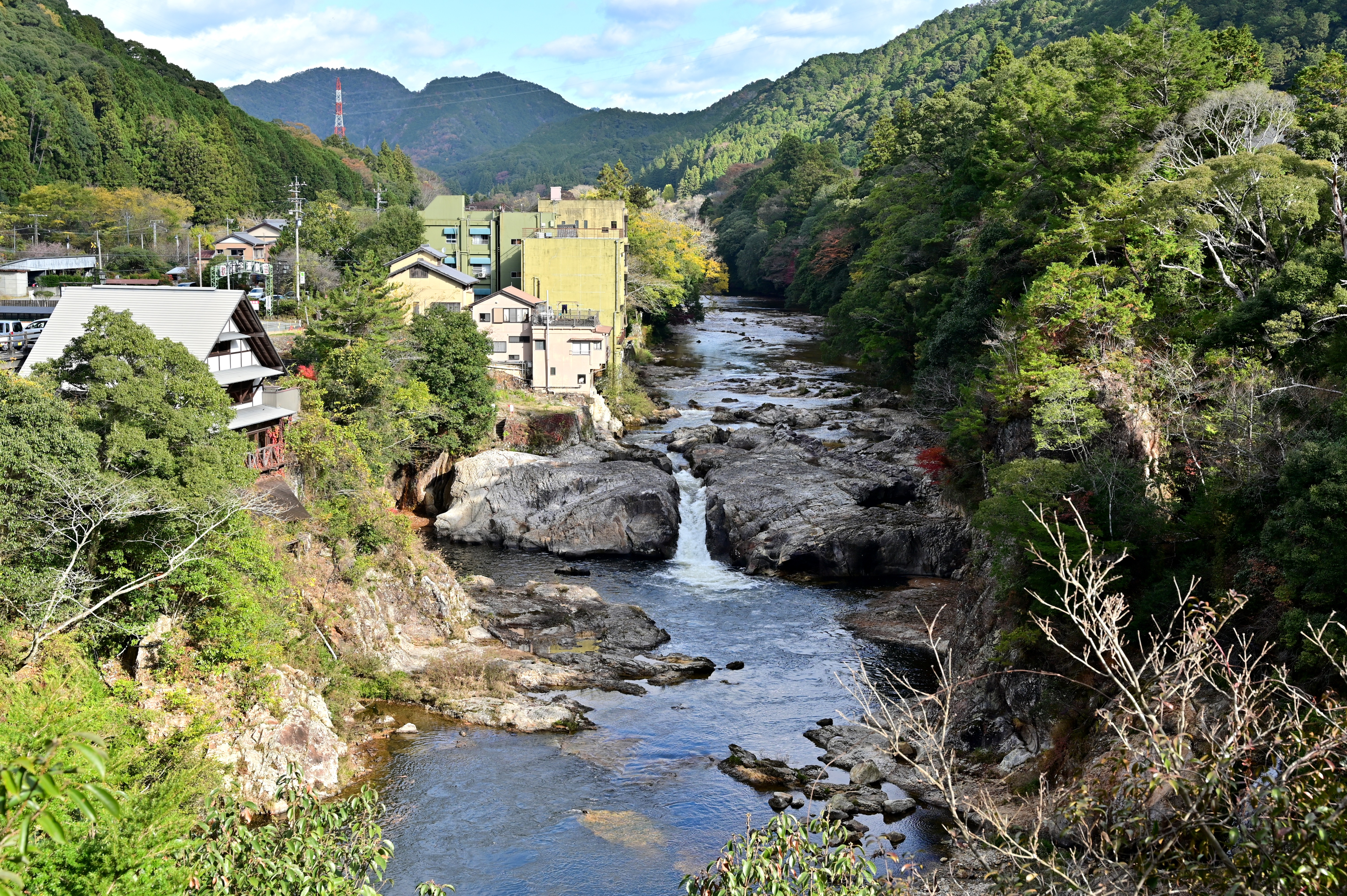
Yuya Onsen

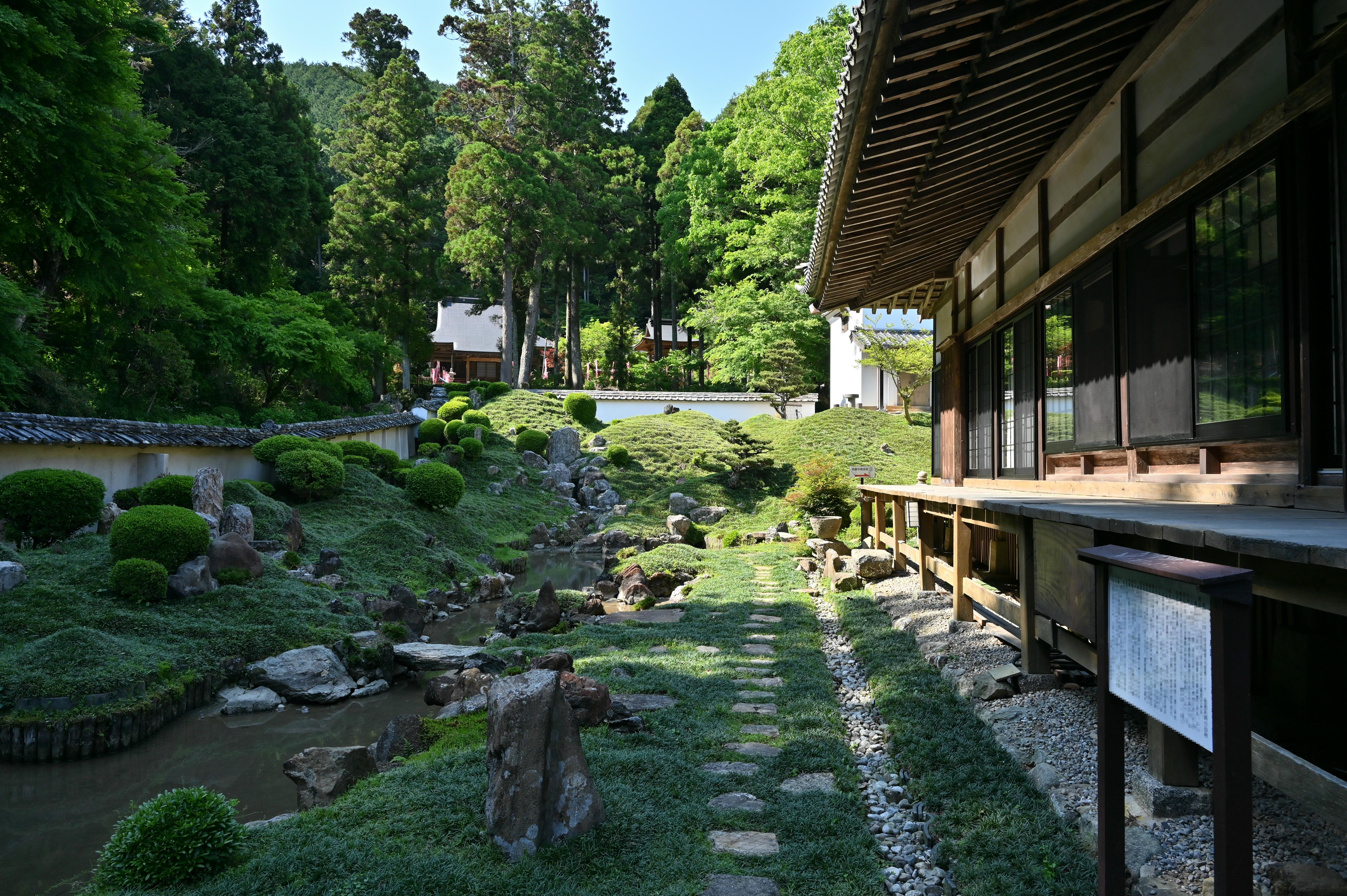
Fuka-ji

== Notable people from Shinshiro ==
- Akihiro Ota, politician
