= Shinshiro Station =

Railway station in Shinshiro, Aichi Prefecture, Japan

Shinshiro Station 新城駅
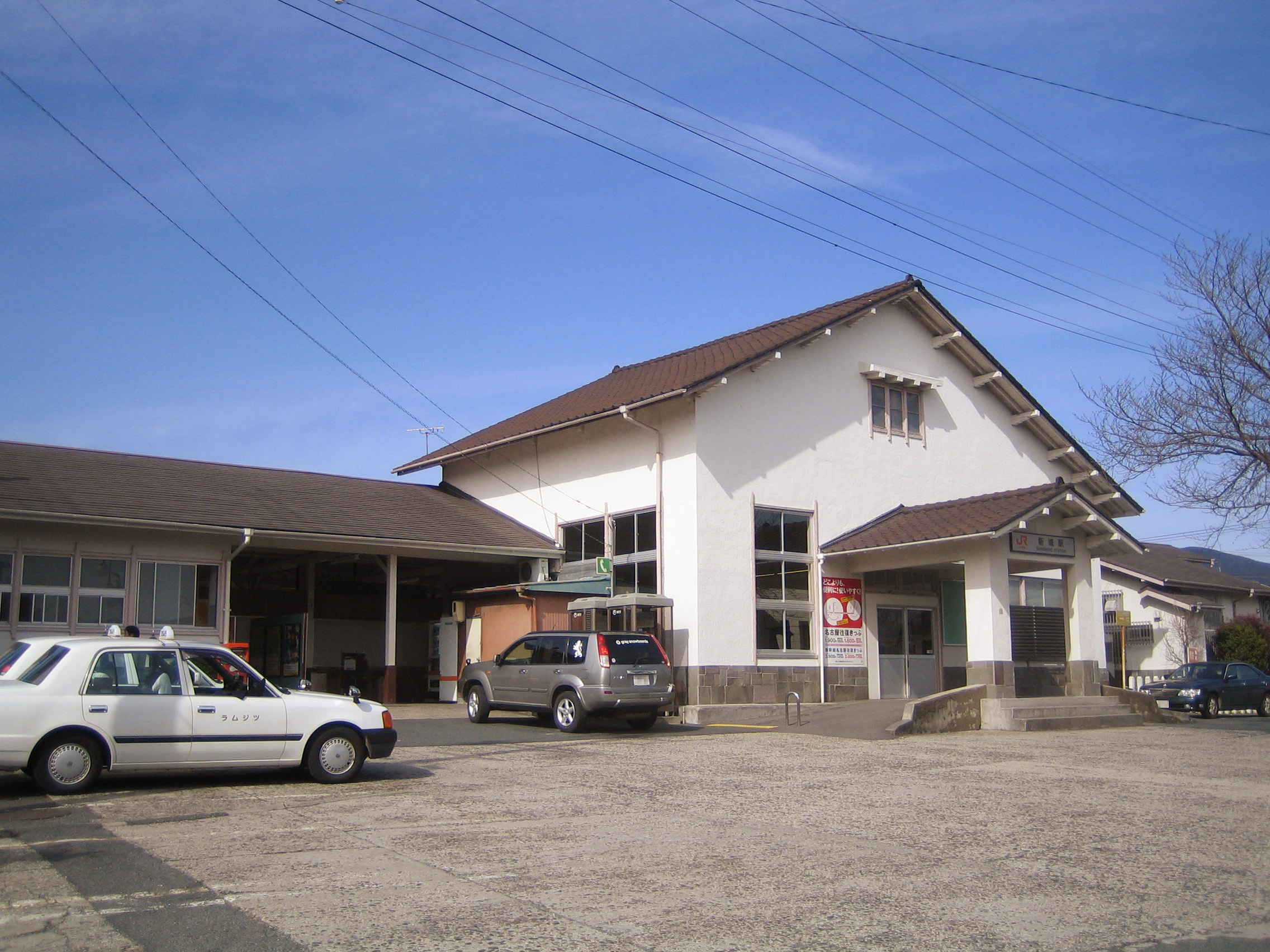
- Shinshiro Station in February 2007

General information
- Location: 30 Miyanonishi, Shinshiro-shi, Aichi-ken 441-1377; Japan
- Coordinates: 34.9004°N 137.4933°E
- Operator: JR Central
- Line: Iida Line
- Distance: 21.6 kilometers from Toyohashi
- Platforms: 1 side + 1 island platform

Other information
- Status: Staffed

History
- Opened: April 25, 1898

Passengers
- FY2006: 636 daily
Location
- Location within Aichi Prefecture Location within Japan

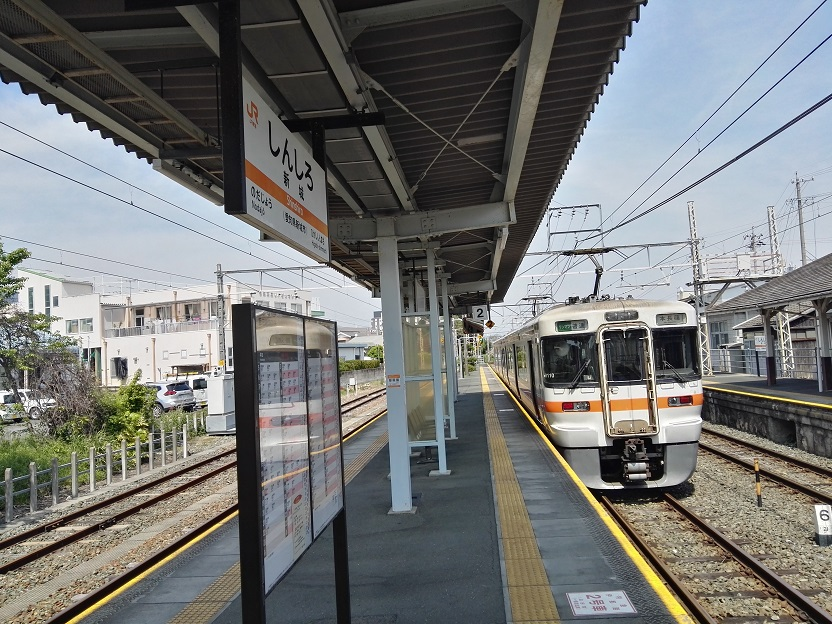
Platform

Shinshiro Station (新城駅, Shinshiro-eki) is a railway station in the city of Shinshiro, Aichi Prefecture, Japan, operated by Central Japan Railway Company (JR Tōkai).

== Lines ==
Shinshiro Station is served by the Iida Line, and is located 21.6 kilometers from the starting point of the line at Toyohashi Station.

== Station layout ==
The station has a one side platform and one island platform connected by a footbridge.The station building has automated ticket machines, TOICA automated turnstiles and is staffed.

=== Platforms ===
1	■ Iida Line	For Toyohashi, Taketoyo
2	■ Iida Line	For Toyohashi; Chūbu-Tenryū and Iida
3	■ Iida Line	For Toyohashi; Chūbu-Tenryū and Iida

== Adjacent stations ==
«	Service	»
Central Japan Railway Company
Iida Line
Toyokawa	Limited Express "Inaji" (特急「伊那路」)	Hon-Nagashino
Nodajō	Local (普通)	Higashi-Shimmachi

== Station history ==
Shinshiro Station was established on April 25, 1898 as a station on the now-defunct Toyokawa Railway (豊川鉄道, Toyokawa Tetsudō). On August 1, 1943, t the Toyokawa Railway were nationalized along with some other local lines to form the Japanese Government Railways (JGR) Iida Line. Scheduled freight operations were discontinued in 1972. Along with its division and privatization of JNR on April 1, 1987, the station came under the control and operation of the Central Japan Railway Company.

== See also ==
- List of railway stations in Japan
