= Higashi-Shimmachi Station =

Railway station in Shinshiro, Aichi Prefecture, Japan

Higashi-Shimmachi Station 東新町駅
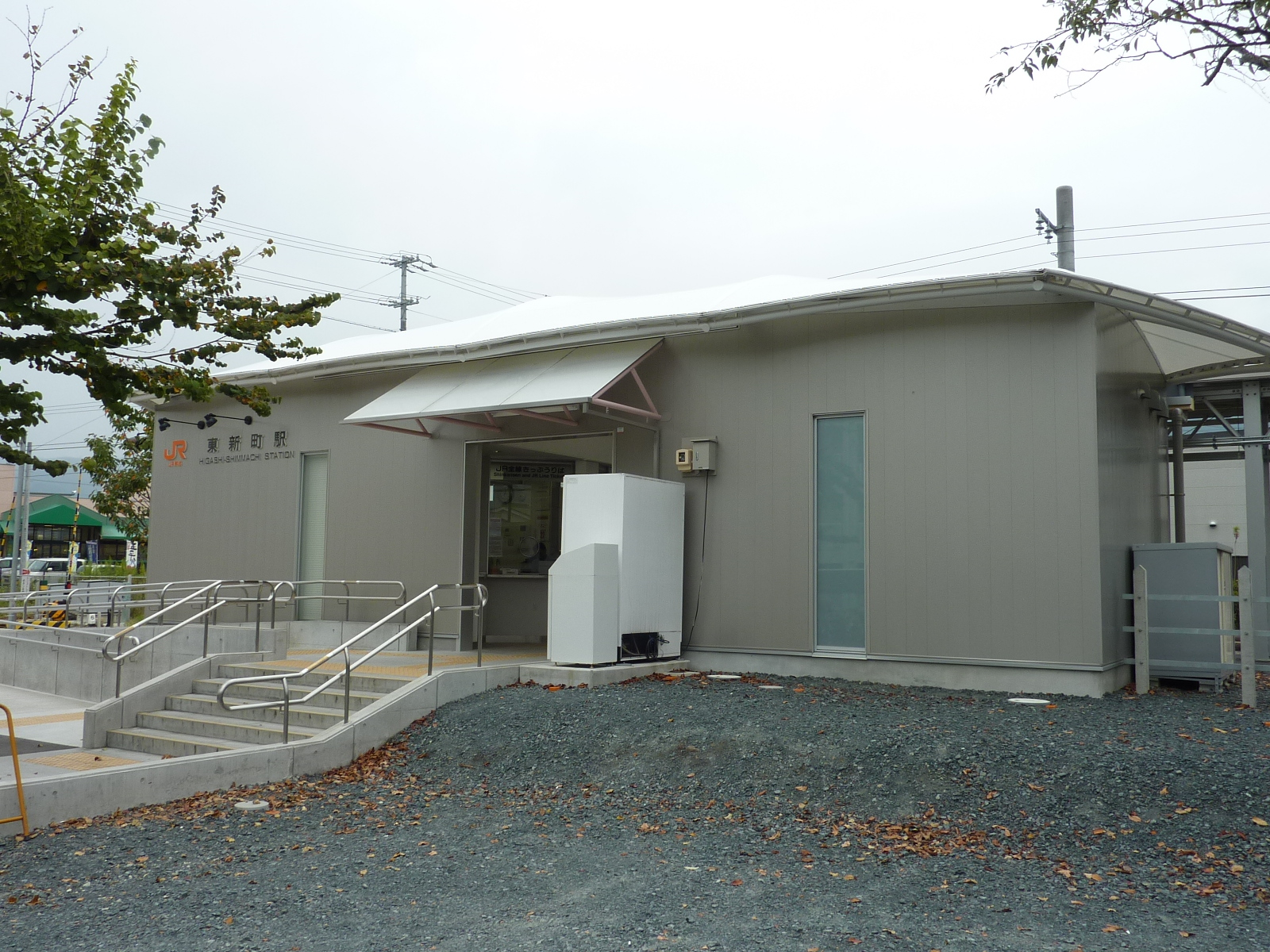
- Higashi-Shimmachi Station in September 2009

General information
- Location: Wakasugi-12 Hirai, Shinshiro-shi, Aichi-ken 441-1361; Japan
- Coordinates: 34.9062°N 137.5027°E
- Operator: JR Central
- Line: Iida Line
- Distance: 22.6 kilometers from Toyohashi
- Platforms: 1 side platform

Other information
- Status: Unstaffed

History
- Opened: January 1, 1914

Passengers
- FY1999: 559 daily
Location
- Location within Aichi Prefecture Location within Japan

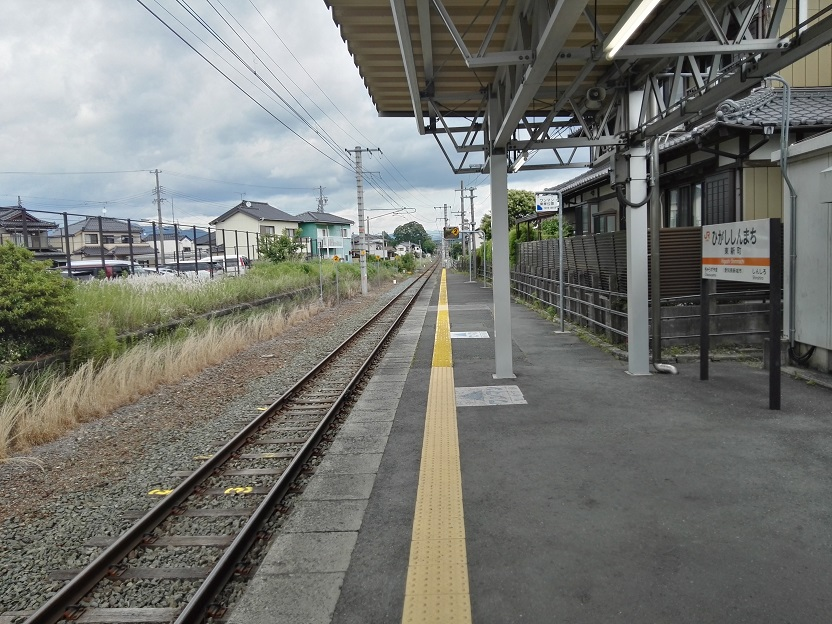
Platform

Higashi-Shimmachi Station (東新町駅, Higashi-Shimmachi-eki) is a railway station in the city of Shinshiro, Aichi Prefecture, Japan, operated by Central Japan Railway Company (JR Tōkai).

== Lines ==
Higashi-Shimmachi Station is served by the Iida Line, and is located 22.6 kilometers from the starting point of the line at Toyohashi Station.

== Station layout ==
The station has a single side platform serving one bi-directional track. It is attended by one agent and does not offer automated systems.

== Adjacent stations ==
«	Service	»
Central Japan Railway Company
Iida Line
Limited Express "Inaji" (特急「伊那路」): Does not stop at this station
Shinshiro	Local (普通)	Chausuyama

== Station history ==
Higashi-Shimmachi Station was established on January 1, 1914, as a station on the now-defunct Toyokawa Railway (豊川鉄道, Toyokawa Tetsudō). On August 1, 1943, t the Toyokawa Railway were nationalized along with some other local lines to form the Japanese Government Railways (JGR) Iida Line. Scheduled freight operations were discontinued in 1971. Along with its division and privatization of JNR on April 1, 1987, the station came under the control and operation of the Central Japan Railway Company. A new station building was completed in December 2006.

== Surrounding area ==
- Shinshiro High School

== See also ==
- List of railway stations in Japan
