= Mikawa-Tōgō Station =

Railway station in Shinshiro, Aichi Prefecture, Japan

Mikawa-Tōgō Station 三河東郷駅
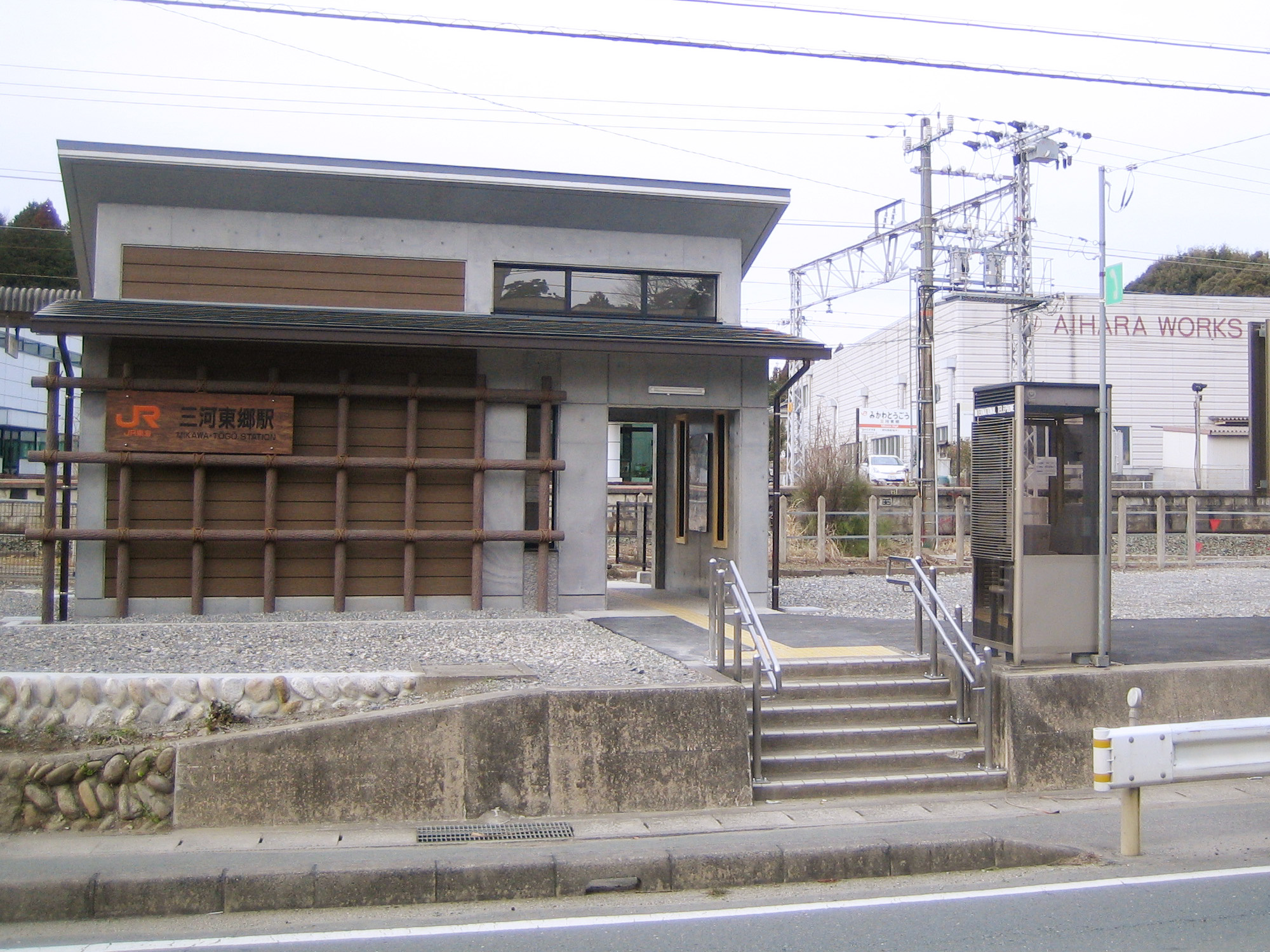
- Mikawa-Tōgō Station in February, 2007

General information
- Location: Yato Kawaji, Shinshiro-shi, Aichi-ken 441-1306; Japan
- Coordinates: 34.9125°N 137.5275°E
- Operator: JR Central
- Line: Iida Line
- Distance: 25.0 kilometers from Toyohashi
- Platforms: 1 island platform

Other information
- Status: Unstaffed

History
- Opened: September 23, 1900
- Former names: Kawaji (to 1943)

Passengers
- FY1999: 134 daily
Location
- Location within Aichi Prefecture Location within Japan

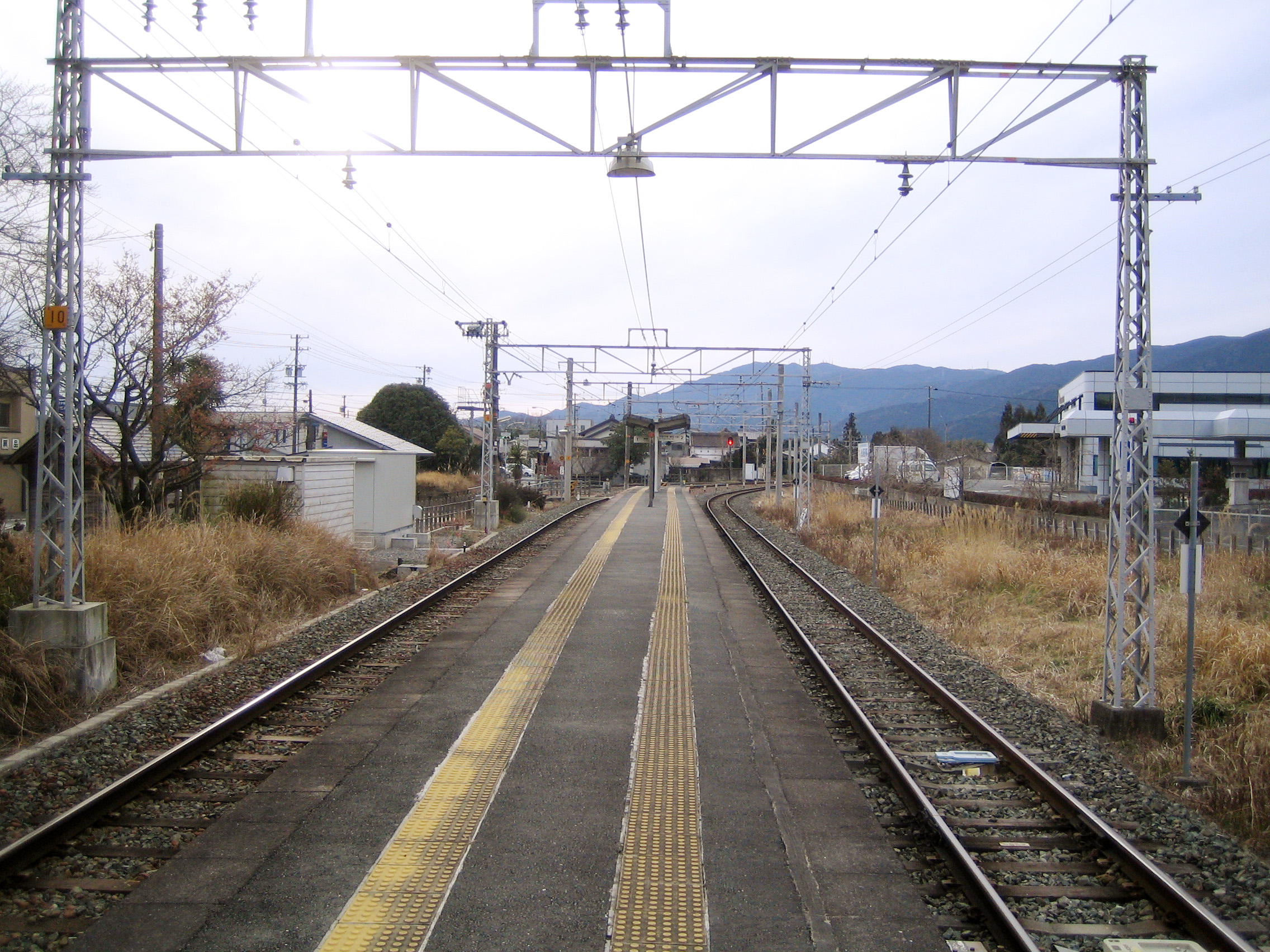
Platform

Mikawa-Tōgō Station (三河東郷駅, Mikawa-Tōgō-eki) is a railway station in the city of Shinshiro, Aichi Prefecture, Japan, operated by Central Japan Railway Company (JR Tōkai).

== Lines ==
Mikawa-Tōgō Station is served by the Iida Line, and is located 25.0 kilometers from the starting point of the line at Toyohashi Station.

== Station layout ==
The station has one island platform connected to the station building by a level crossing. The station building has automated ticket machines, TOICA automated turnstiles and is unattended. The station building is modeled after a wooden palisade from the time of the Battle of Nagashino, which took place near the station.

=== Platforms ===
1	■ Tōkaidō Main Line	For Toyohashi
2	■ Tōkaidō Main Line	For Chūbu-Tenryū and Iida

== Adjacent stations ==
«	Service	»
Central Japan Railway Company
Iida Line
Limited Express "Inaji" (特急「伊那路」): Does not stop at this station
Chausuyama	Local (普通)	Ōmi

== Station history ==
Mikawa-Tōgō Station was established on September 23, 1900 as Kawaji Station (川路駅, Kawaji-eki) on the now-defunct Toyokawa Railway (豊川鉄道, Toyokawa Tetsudō). On August 1, 1943, the Toyokawa Railway was nationalized along with some other local lines to form the Japanese Government Railways (JGR) Iida Line, and the station was renamed to its present name. Scheduled freight operations were discontinued in 1962. The station has been unattended since 1984. Along with its division and privatization of JNR on April 1, 1987, the station came under the control and operation of the JR Tōkai.

== Surrounding area ==
- Yokohama Rubber Shichiro plant
- Noda Castle ruins

== See also ==
- List of railway stations in Japan
