= Nagashinojō Station =

Railway station in Shinshiro, Aichi Prefecture, Japan

Nagashinojō Station 長篠城駅
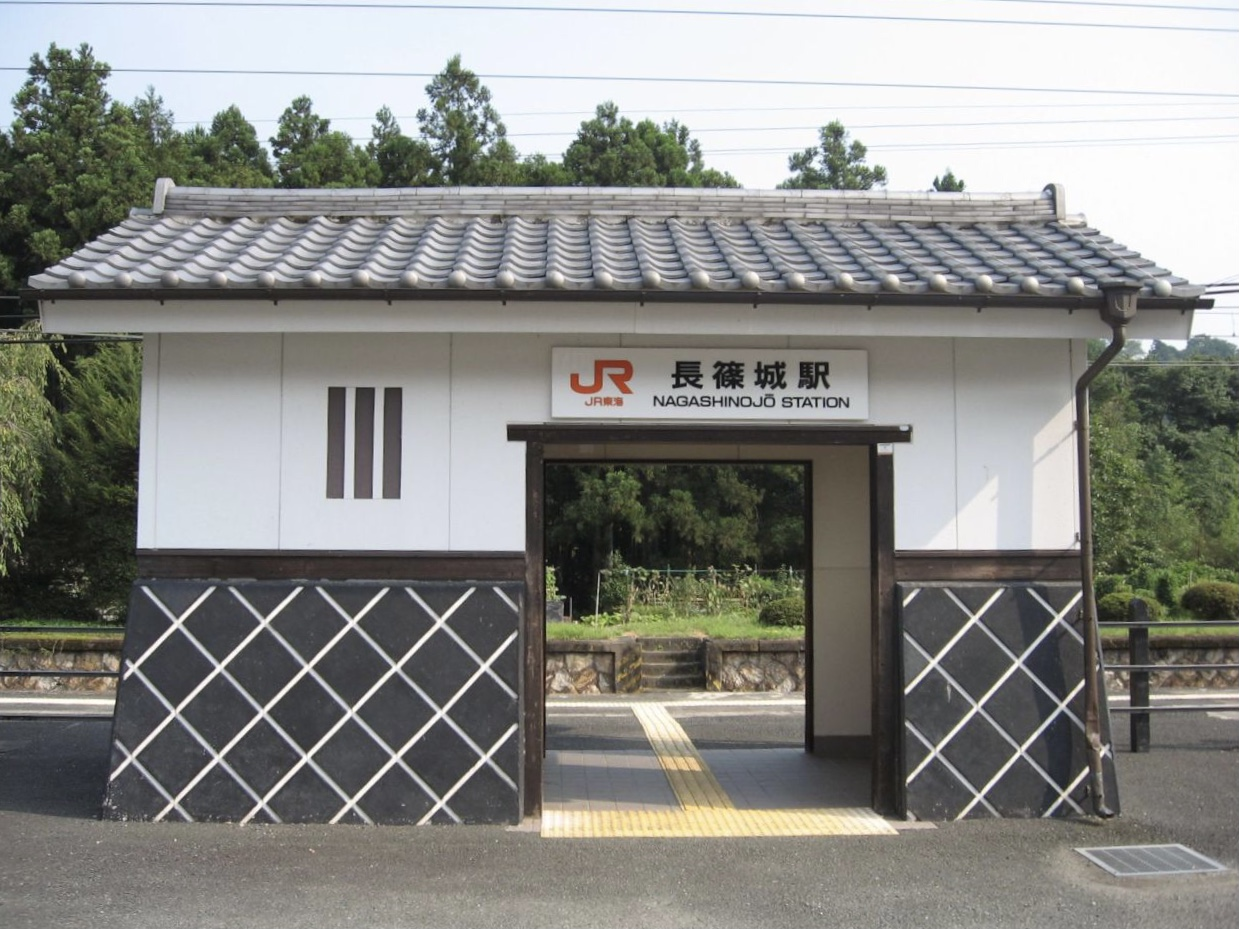
- Nagashinojō Station in August 2006

General information
- Location: Morishita Nagashino, Shinshiro-shi, Aichi-ken 441-1634; Japan
- Coordinates: 34.9259°N 137.5653°E
- Operator: JR Central
- Line: Iida Line
- Distance: 30.8 kilometers from Toyohashi
- Platforms: 1 side platform

Other information
- Status: Unstaffed

History
- Opened: April 1, 1924
- Former names: Nagashinokojōshi (until 1943)

Passengers
- FY1999: 65daily
Location
- Location within Aichi Prefecture Location within Japan

Nagashinojō Station (長篠城駅, Nagashinojō-eki) is a railway station in the city of Shinshiro, Aichi Prefecture, Japan, operated by Central Japan Railway Company (JR Tōkai).

== Lines ==
Nagashinojō Station is served by the Iida Line, and is located 30.8 kilometers from the starting point of the line at Toyohashi Station.

== Station layout ==
The station has a single side platform serving bidirectional one track.The station building has automated ticket machines, TOICA automated turnstiles and is unattended.

== Adjacent stations ==
«	Service	»
Central Japan Railway Company
Iida Line
Limited Express "Inaji" (特急「伊那路」): Does not stop at this station
Torii	Local (普通)	Hon-Nagashino

== Station history ==
Nagashinojō Station was established on April 1, 1924 as Nagashinokojōshi Station (長篠古城址駅, Nagashinokojōshi -eki) on the now-defunct Hōraiji Railway (鳳来寺鉄道, Horaiji Tetsudo). On August 1, 1943, the Hōraiji Railway was nationalized along with some other local lines to form the Japanese Government Railways (JGR) Iida Line and the station was renamed to its present name. Scheduled freight operations were discontinued in 1962. The station has been unattended since 1971 Along with its division and privatization of JNR on April 1, 1987, the station came under the control and operation of the Central Japan Railway Company (JR Tōkai).

== Surrounding area ==
- Nagashino Castle ruins

== See also ==
- List of railway stations in Japan
