= Tōjō Station (Aichi) =

Railway station in Toyokawa, Aichi Prefecture, Japan

Tōjō Station 東上駅
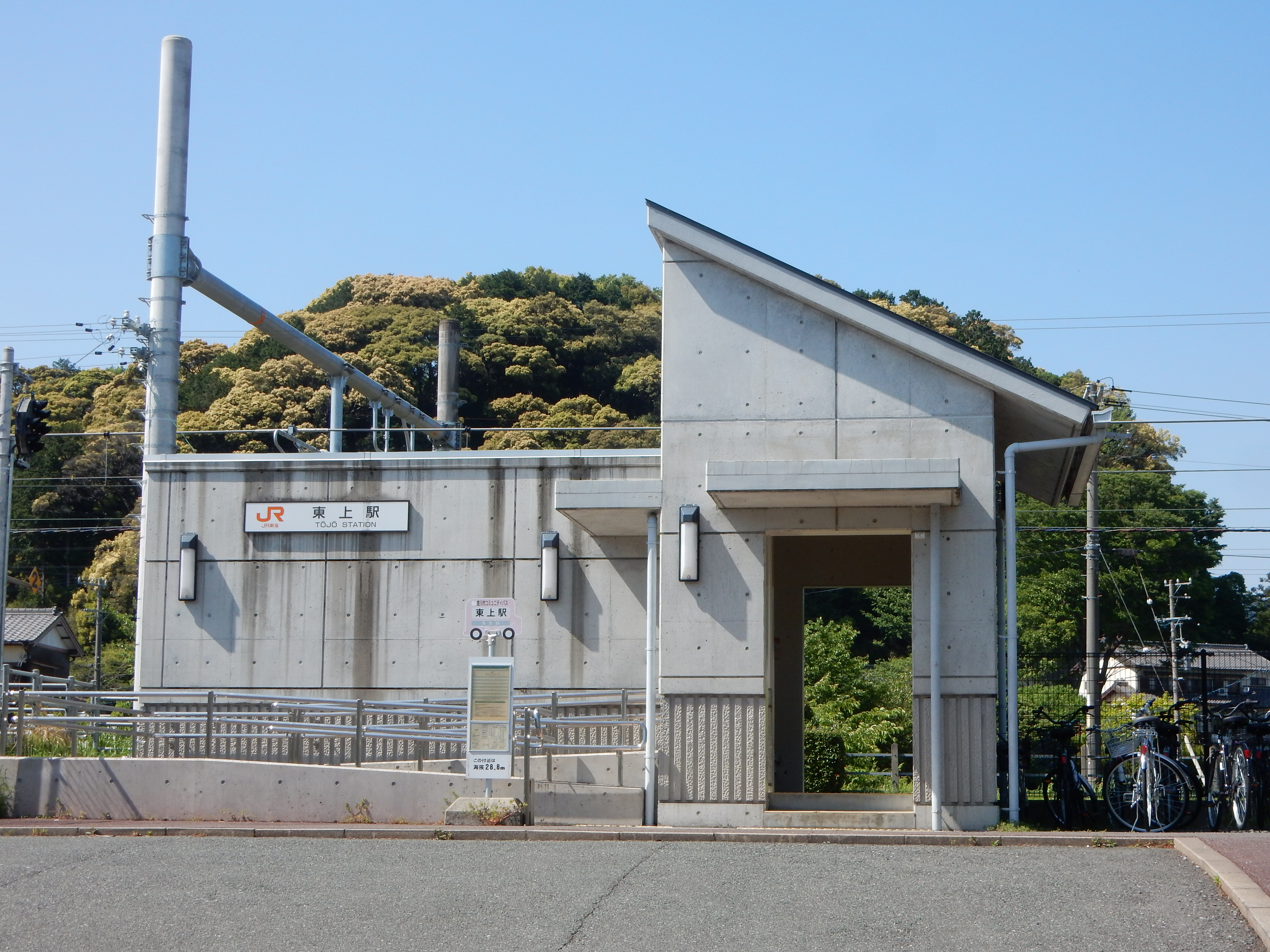
- Tōjō Station building in 2018

General information
- Location: Tōkyōji-46 Tōjōchō, Toyokawa-shi, Aichi-ken 441-1201; Japan
- Coordinates: 34.8755°N 137.4547°E
- Operator: JR Central
- Line: Iida Line
- Distance: 17.0 kilometers from Toyohashi
- Platforms: 2 side platforms

Other information
- Status: Unstaffed

History
- Opened: April 25, 1898

Passengers
- FY2017: 167 daily
Location
- Location within Aichi Prefecture Location within Japan

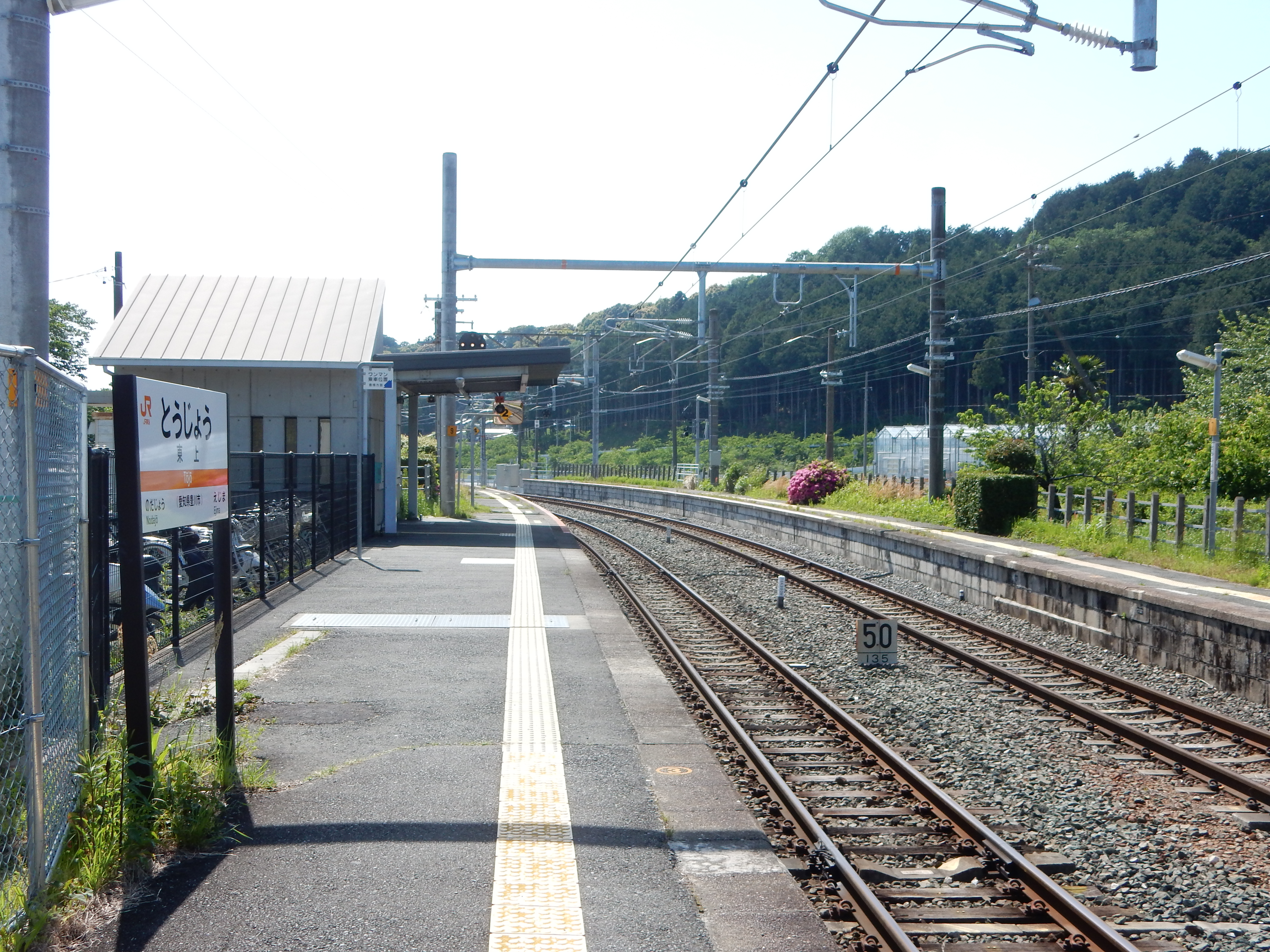
Platform

Tōjō Station (東上駅, Tōjō-eki) is a railway station in the city of Toyokawa, Aichi Prefecture, Japan, operated by Central Japan Railway Company (JR Tōkai).

== Lines ==
Tōjō Station is served by the Iida Line, and is located 17.0 kilometers from the southern terminus of the line at Toyohashi Station.

== Station layout ==
The station has two opposed side platforms connected by a footbridge. The station building is unattended.

=== Platforms ===
1	■ Iida Line	For Toyohashi
2	■ Iida Line	For Toyokawa, Iida

== Adjacent stations ==
«	Service	»
Central Japan Railway Company
Iida Line
Limited Express "Inaji" (特急「伊那路」): Does not stop at this station
Ejima	Local (普通)	Nodajō

== Station history ==
Tōjō Station was established on April 25, 1898 as a station on the now-defunct Toyokawa Railway (豊川鉄道, Toyokawa Tetsudō). On August 1, 1943, the Toyokawa Railway was nationalized, along with some other local lines to form the Japanese Government Railways (JGR) Iida Line. Scheduled freight operations were discontinued in 1963. The station has been unattended since February 1984. Following the division and privatization of JNR on April 1, 1987, the station came under the control and operation of the Central Japan Railway Company (JR Tōkai). A new station building was completed in January 2007.

== Passenger statistics ==
In fiscal 2017, the station was used by an average of 167 passengers daily.

== Surrounding area ==
- Japan National Route 151

== See also ==
- List of railway stations in Japan
