= Suganuma Sadamichi =

Suganuma Sadamichi (Japanese: 菅沼貞道) was a samurai commander during Japan's Sengoku period, who served Tokugawa Ieyasu.

He fought in the 1570 Battle of Anegawa against Asai clan and Asakura clan. He also fought in the 1573 Siege of Noda Castle, in which he attempted to defend Noda castle against Takeda Shingen.

It is unclear whether Sadamichi is the same person as Suganuma Sadamitsu (1542–1604), who served the Imagawa and Tokugawa.
