= Siege of Noda Castle =

1573 siege

Coordinates: 34°52′55″N 137°28′06″E

- Part of the Sengoku period
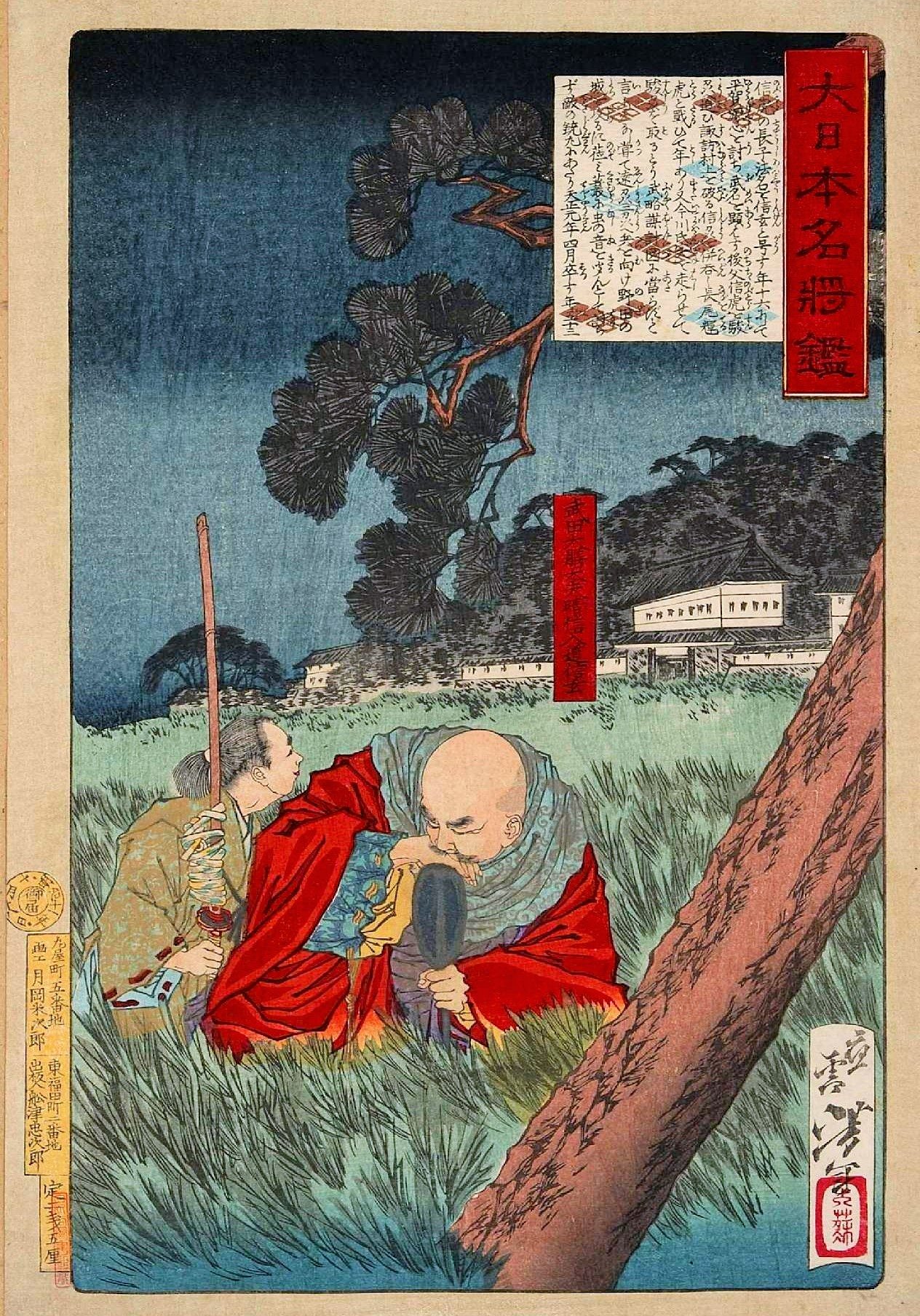
- Takeda Shingen listening to the singing of insects in the grass outside Noda Castle during the siege. Illustration by Tsukioka Yoshitoshi
Date	1573
Location	Noda Castle, Mikawa Province (today Shinshiro, Aichi)
Result	Siege succeeds, but Takeda Shingen wounded, possibly fatally

Belligerents
forces of Takeda Shingen	forces loyal to Tokugawa Ieyasu

Commanders and leaders
Takeda Shingen	Suganuma Sadamichi

Strength
30,000	500

The siege of Noda Castle (野田城の戦い) took place from January to February 1573, between the forces of the Takeda clan, led by Takeda Shingen, against the Tokugawa clan, led by Tokugawa Ieyasu. Along with the Battle of Mikatagahara, it was one of the final battles of Takeda Shingen's career.

== Background ==
Encouraged by his victory over the Tokugawa at the Battle of Mikatagahara in neighboring Tōtōmi Province, Takeda Shingen decided to push further into Mikawa Province, hoping to open a route to the capital, Kyoto. Leading a mixed cavalry and infantry force of 30,000 men, Shingen skirted the northern shore of Lake Hamana before advancing inland into Mikawa. His route was opposed by approximately 500 defenders of Noda Castle, situated on the Toyokawa river, commanded by Suganuma Sadamichi. Shingen was confident in his strength of numbers, and in his knowledge that the Tokugawa forces were overextended in various campaigns. Furthermore, his forces had taken Noda Castle with ease during a reconnaissance-in-force two years earlier.

== Battle ==
Suganuma had extensively increased the defensive capabilities of Noda Castle over the past two years with additional earthworks and a wooden palisade.

However, Shingen's kanabori-shū (sapper corps, composed of troops with mining experience) tunneled into the castle moat, draining it and depriving the defenders of their drinking water as well as their primary defense.

Shingen extended an offer to spare the lives of the rank-and-file troops provided that Suganuma surrender on February 16.

Although the castle's surrender was now imminent, Shingen let his guard down when he approached the castle, and a sniper shot him.

== Aftermath ==
Following the surrender of Noda Castle, Tokugawa forces were in retreat throughout Mikawa, and even Tokugawa Ieyasu's stronghold of Okazaki Castle was threatened. However, Takeda Shingen died in May 1573 (whether from illness or from the wound sustained at the siege of Noda Castle), and his forces were unable to maintain their momentum under his successor, Takeda Katsuyori.
