= Chausuyama Station =

Railway station in Shinshiro, Aichi Prefecture, Japan

Chausuyama Station 茶臼山駅
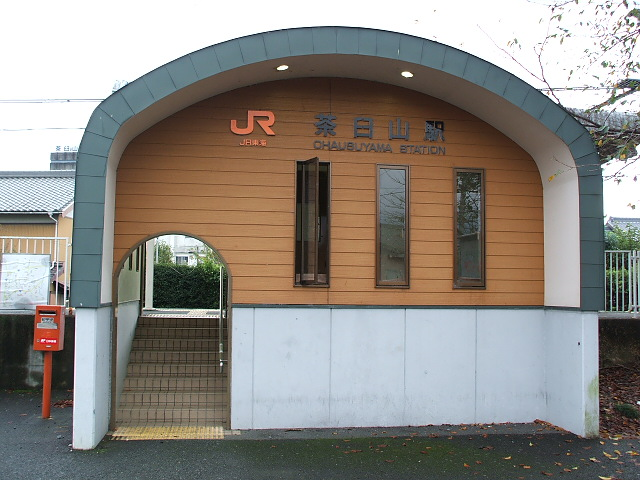
- Chausuyama Station in October 2007

General information
- Location: Shijō-14 Tominaga, Shinshiro-shi, Aichi-ken 441-1302; Japan
- Coordinates: 34.9102°N 137.5144°E
- Operator: JR Central
- Line: Iida Line
- Distance: 23.8 kilometers from Toyohashi
- Platforms: 1 side platform

Other information
- Status: Unstaffed

History
- Opened: May 1, 1926

Passengers
- FY1999: 359 daily
Location
- Location within Aichi Prefecture Location within Japan

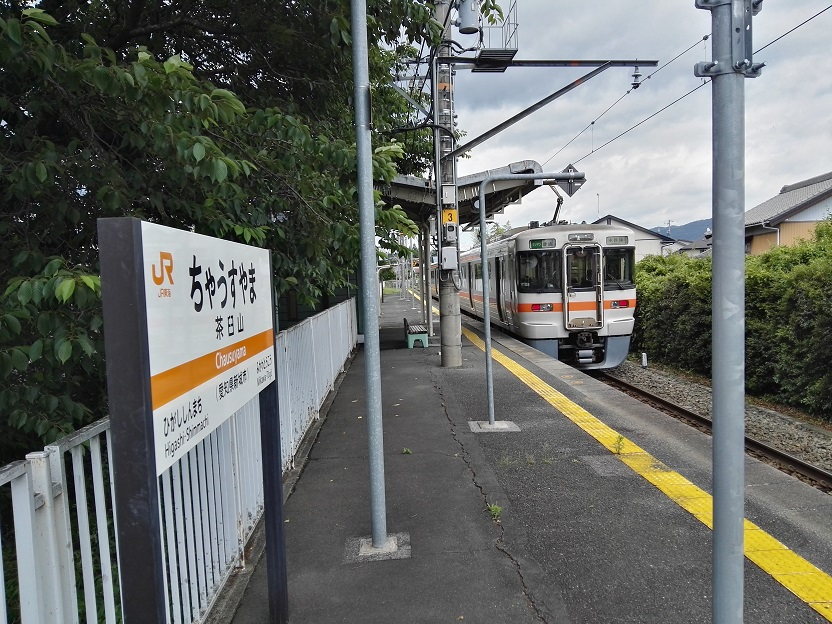
Platform

Chausuyama Station (茶臼山駅, Chausuyama-eki) is a railway station in the city of Shinshiro, Aichi Prefecture, Japan, operated by Central Japan Railway Company (JR Tōkai).

== Lines ==
Chausuyama Station is served by the Iida Line, and is located 23.8 kilometers from the starting point of the line at Toyohashi Station.

== Station layout ==
The station has a single side platform serving one bidirectional track.The station building has automated ticket machines, TOICA automated turnstiles and is unattended.

== Adjacent stations ==
«	Service	»
Central Japan Railway Company
Iida Line
Limited Express "Inaji" (特急「伊那路」): Does not stop at this station
Higashi-Shimmachi	Local (普通)	Mikawa-Tōgō

== Station history ==
Chausuyama Station was established on May 1, 1926, as a station on the now-defunct Toyokawa Railway (豊川鉄道, Toyokawa Tetsudō). On August 1, 1943, t the Toyokawa Railway were nationalized along with some other local lines to form the Japanese Government Railways (JGR) Iida Line. Scheduled freight operations were discontinued in 1962. The station has been unattended since 1971. Along with its division and privatization of JNR on April 1, 1987, the station came under the control and operation of the Central Japan Railway Company (JR Tōkai). A new station building was completed in February 1996.

== Surrounding area ==
- Japan National Route 151

== See also ==
- List of railway stations in Japan
