= Ōmi Station (Aichi) =

Railway station in Shinshiro, Aichi Prefecture, Japan

Ōmi Station 大海駅
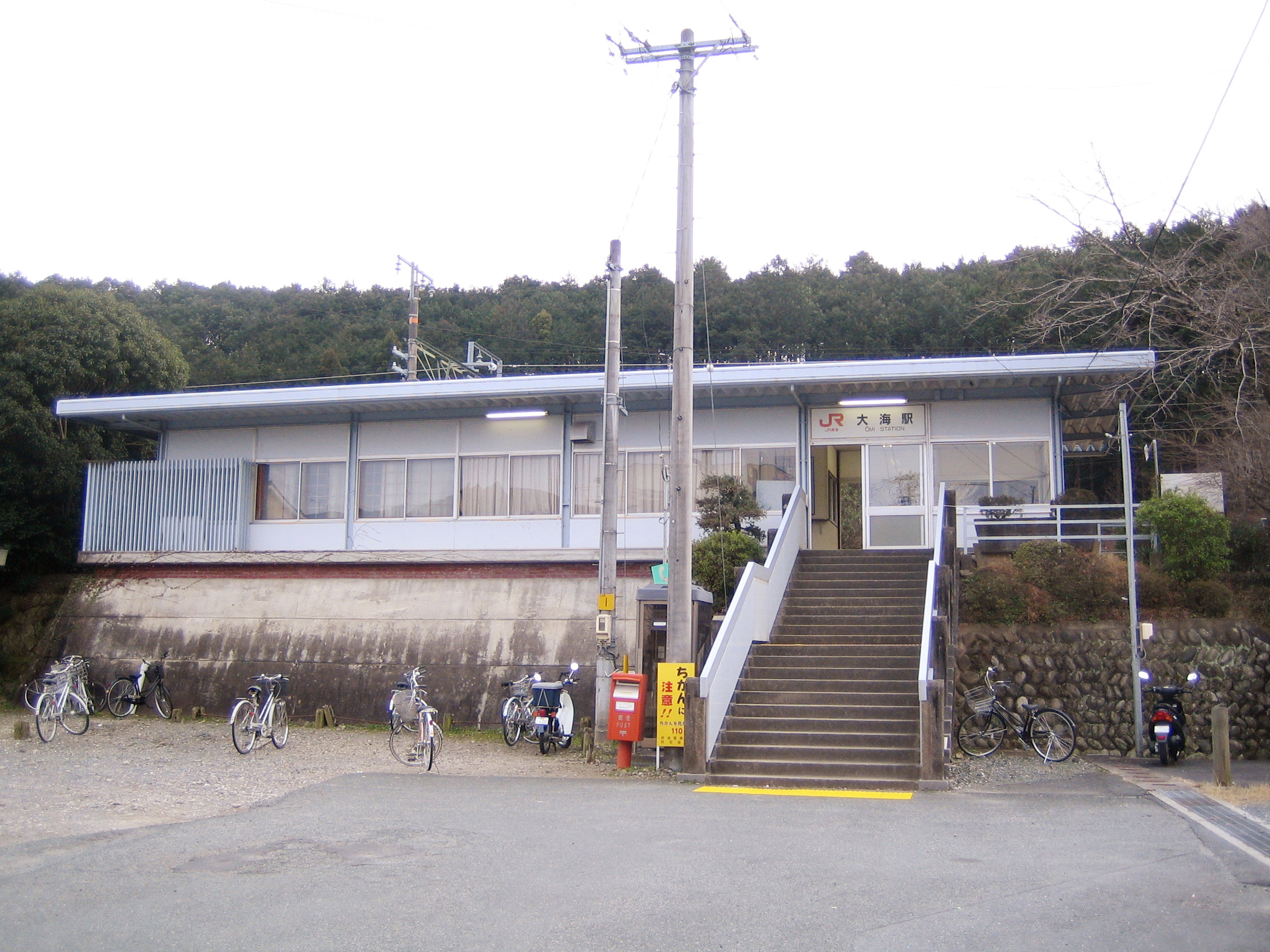
- Ōmi Station in February 2007

General information
- Location: Minamida-49 Ōmi, Shinshiro-shi, Aichi-ken 441-1315; Japan
- Coordinates: 34.9299°N 137.5484°E
- Operator: JR Central
- Line: Iida Line
- Distance: 27.9 kilometers from Toyohashi
- Platforms: 1 side + 1 island platforms

Other information
- Status: Unstaffed

History
- Opened: September 23, 1900
- Former names: Nagashino (until 1943)

Passengers
- FY1999: 216 daily
Location
- Location within Aichi Prefecture Location within Japan

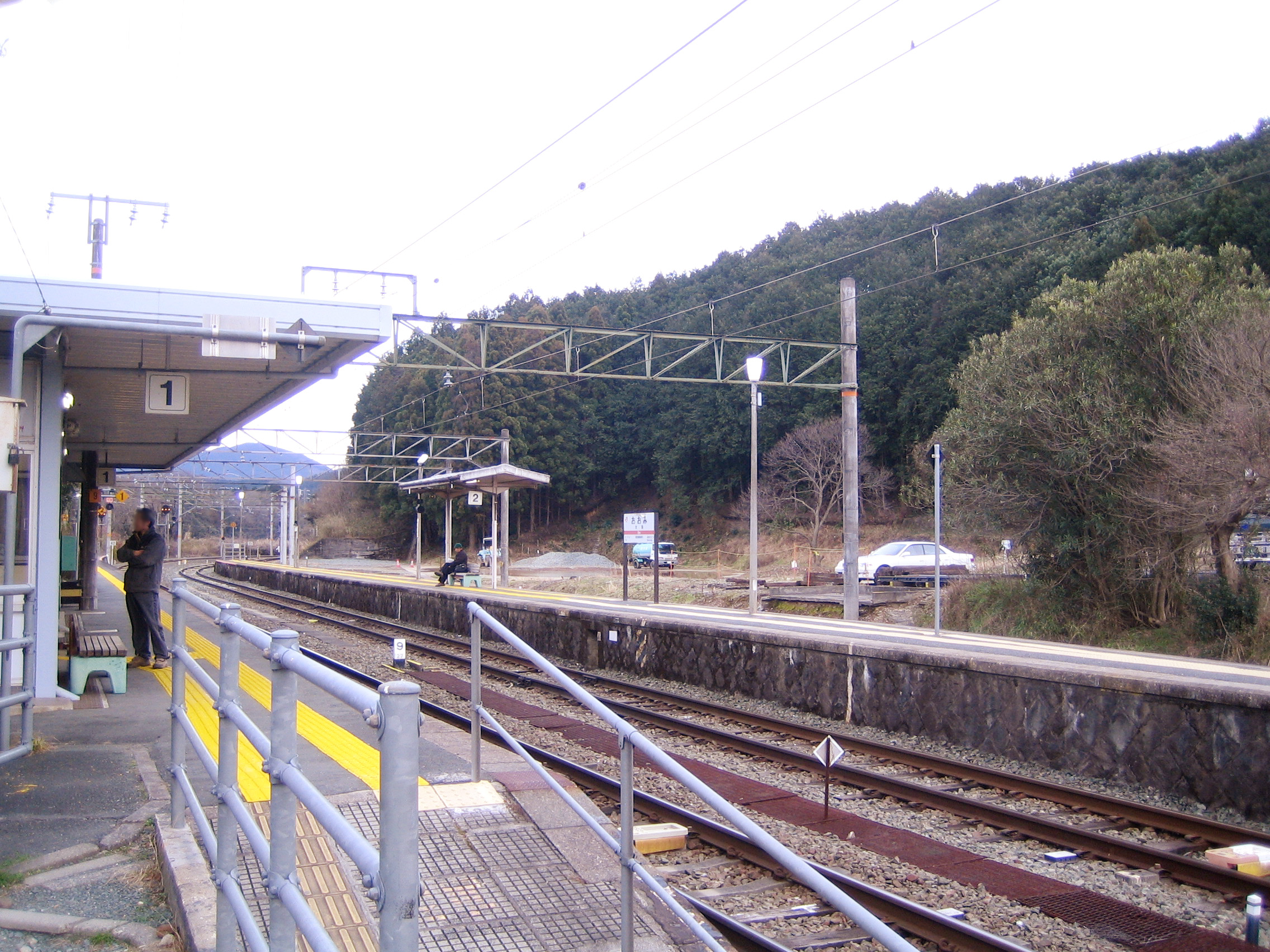
Platform

Ōmi Station (大海駅, Ōmi-eki) is a railway station in the city of Shinshiro, Aichi Prefecture, Japan, operated by Central Japan Railway Company (JR Tōkai).

== Lines ==
Ōmi Station is served by the Iida Line, and is located 27.9 kilometers from the starting point of the line at Toyohashi Station.

== Station layout ==
The station has a one side platform and one island platform, of which the outer track (Platform 3) is unused. The platforms are connected by a level crossing.The station building has automated ticket machines, TOICA automated turnstiles and is unattended.

=== Platforms ===
1	■ Iida Line	For Chūbu-Tenryū, Iida
2, 3	■ Iida Line	For Toyohashi

== Adjacent stations ==
«	Service	»
Central Japan Railway Company
Iida Line
Limited Express "Inaji" (特急「伊那路」): Does not stop at this station
Mikawa-Tōgō	Local (普通)	Torii

== Station history ==
Ōmi Station was established on September 23, 1900, as a station on the now-defunct Toyokawa Railway (豊川鉄道, Toyokawa Tetsudō). The station was renamed Nagashino Station (長篠駅, Nagashino-eki) on March 15, 1903. On February 1, 1923, the Hōraiji Railway connected to this station. On August 1, 1943, the Hōraiji Railway and the Toyokawa Railway were nationalized along with some other local lines to form the Japanese Government Railways (JGR) Iida Line, and the station was renamed to its present name. The present station building was completed in August 1969. Scheduled freight operations were discontinued in 1984. The station has been unattended since April 1985. Along with its division and privatization of JNR on April 1, 1987, the station came under the control and operation of the Central Japan Railway Company.

== Surrounding area ==
- Japan National Route 151
- Nagashino Castle ruins

== See also ==
- List of railway stations in Japan
