= Noda Castle =

Sengoku period castle in Japan

Coordinates: 34°52′55″N 137°28′06″E

- 野田城
- Shinshiro, Aichi, Japan

Site information
- Type: Flatland
- Condition: Reconstructed 1571

Location

Site history
- Built: 1508
- In use: 1508-1590
- Demolished: 1590

Garrison information
- Occupants: Suganuma clan

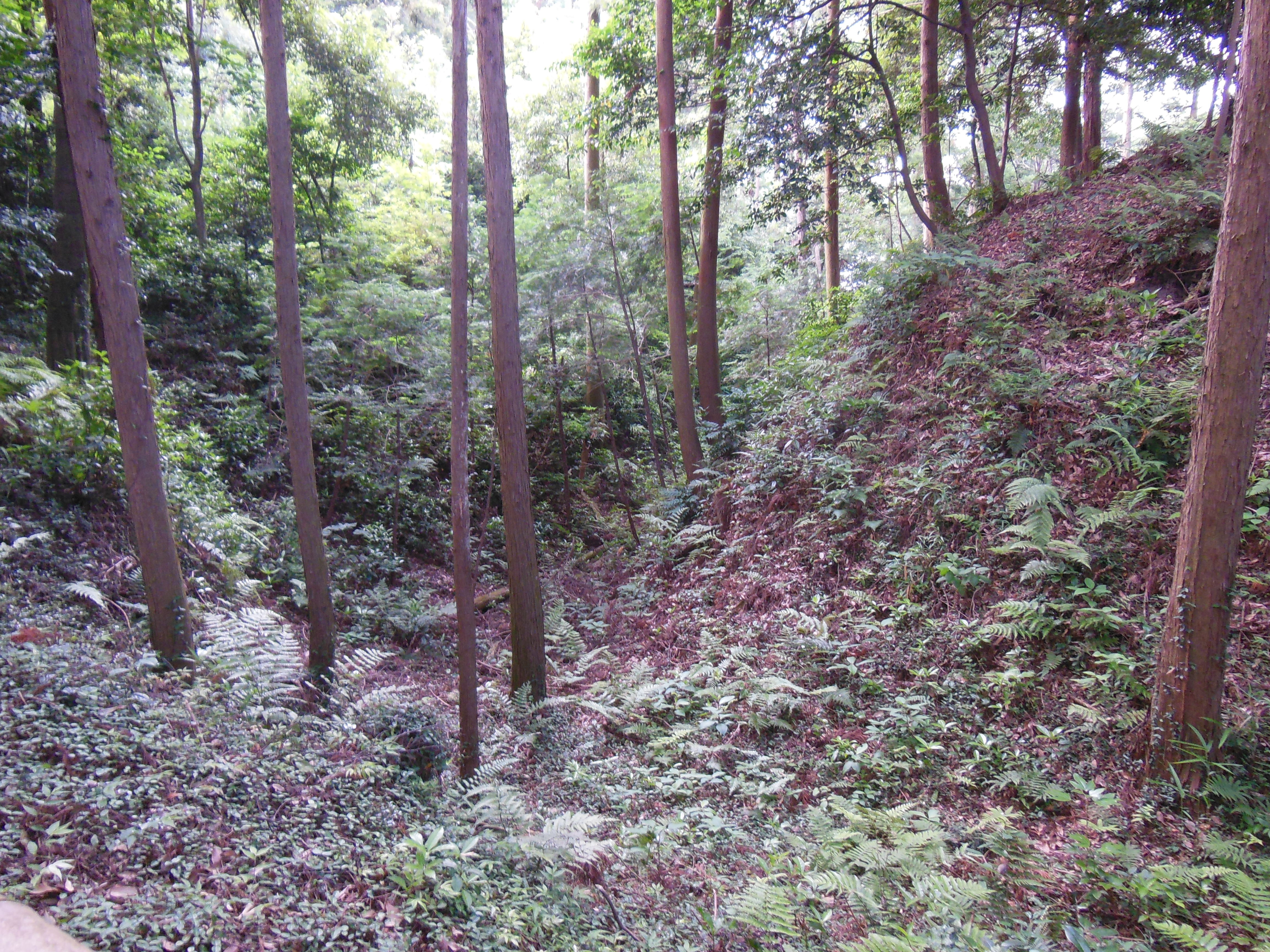
Ruined site of Noda Castle in Mikawa Province

Noda Castle (野田城, Noda-jō) was a Sengoku period castle located in eastern Mikawa Province in what is today part of the city of Shinshiro, Aichi Prefecture, Japan.

== History ==
A fortified residence was constructed on this site by Suganuma Sadanori in 1508. The Suganuma clan were a subordination branch of the Okudaira clan, who ruled most of Mikawa Province. The castle was seized by the Imagawa clan in 1560, shortly before their defeat at the Battle of Okehazama in Owari Province. Suganuma Sadamitsu recovered the castle in a night battle in 1562. However, in 1571, a reconnaissance-in-force by the Takeda clan, led by Yamagata Masakage took the castle and held it briefly with little difficulty. When the armies of the Takeda clan, led by Takeda Shingen invaded Mikawa Province in 1573, the Takeda clan attempted to seize Noda Castle once again. However, in the past couple of years, the castle defenses had been increased by Suganuma Sadamichi, and the castle held out for several weeks.

They only reached the point of surrender after Takeda's sappers tunneled into the moats, draining them of water. During this Siege of Noda Castle, Takeda Shingen was wounded by a sniper's bullet, possibly fatally as he died only a few weeks later.

Noda Castle was abandoned around 1590, after Tokugawa Ieyasu relocated to Edo Castle. The site now is an overgrown forested area, with only a stone marker to commemorate the location.
