= Tōei Station =

Railway station in Tōei, Aichi Prefecture, Japan

Tōei Station 東栄駅
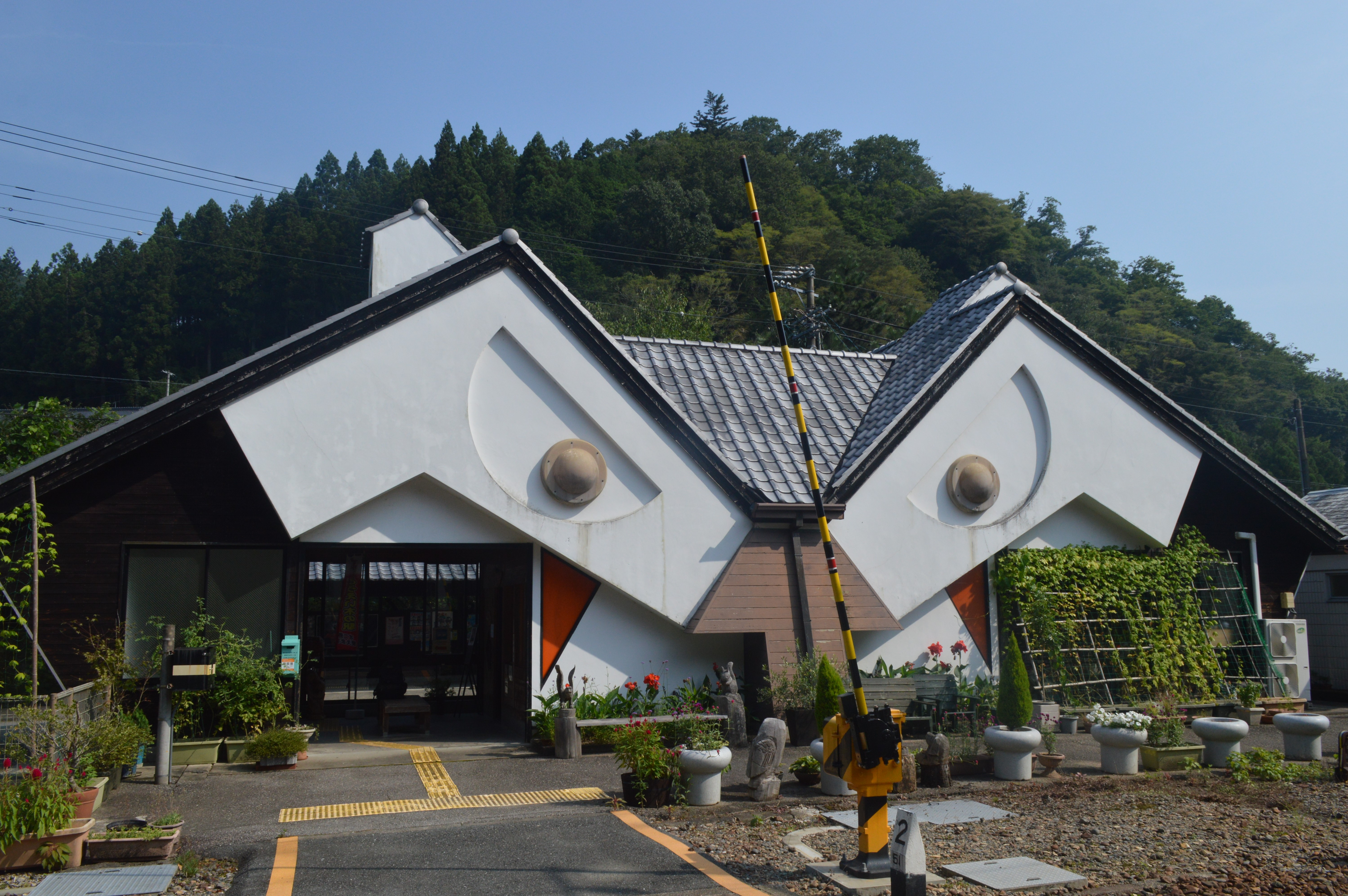
- Tōei Station in August 2020

General information
- Location: Miwa Hirakuri 53, Tōei-machi, Kitashitara-gun, Aichi-ken 449-0216; Japan
- Coordinates: 35°01′45.26″N 137°42′50.01″E
- Operator: JR Central
- Line: Iida Line
- Distance: 51.2 kilometers from Toyohashi
- Platforms: 1 island platform

Other information
- Status: Unstaffed

History
- Opened: December 21, 1933
- Former names: Miwamura (to 1934); Sanshin-Miwa (until 1943); Mikawa-Nagaoka (to 1956)

Passengers
- FY 1999: 167 daily
Location
- Location within Aichi Prefecture Location within Japan

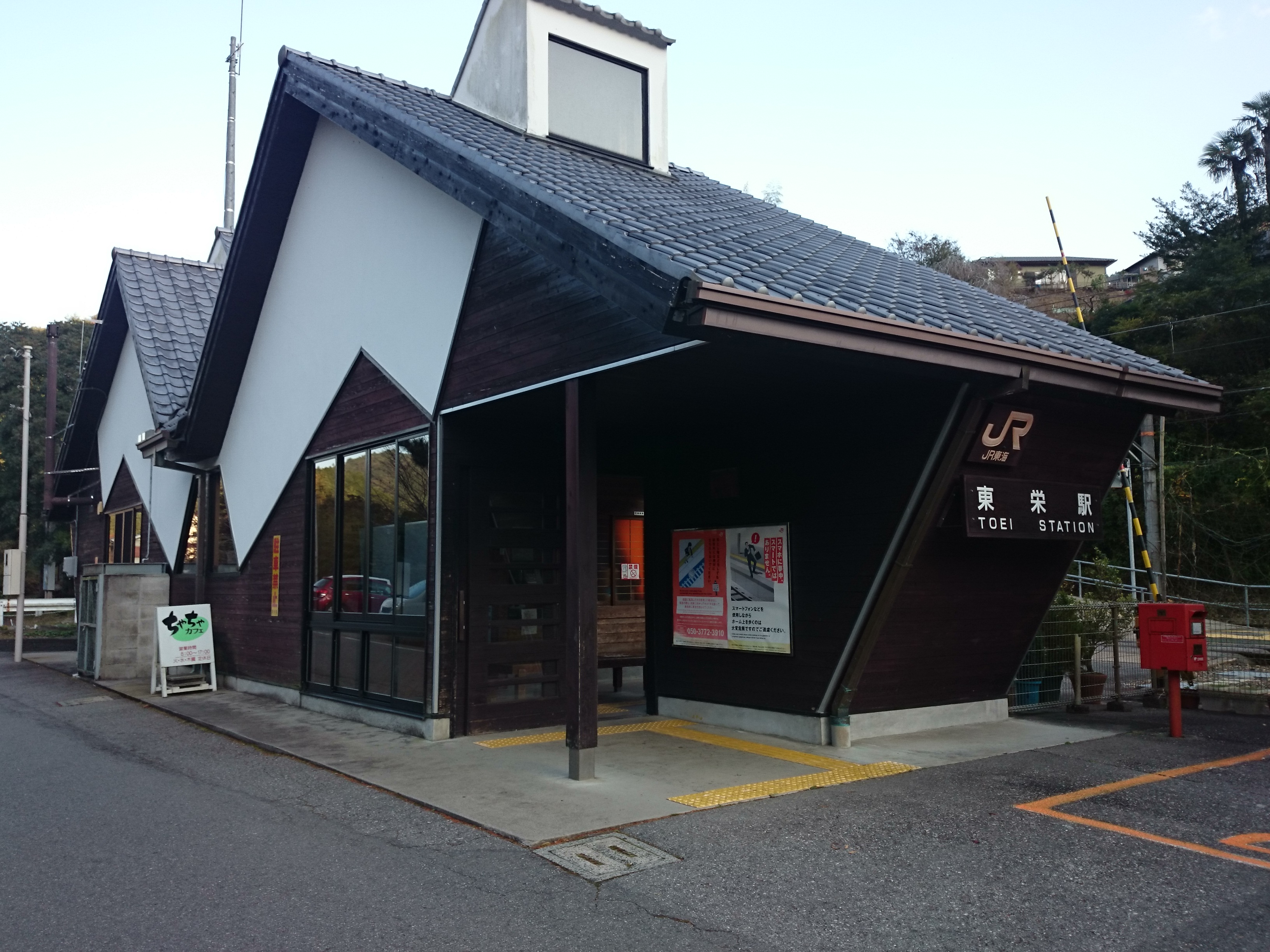
North entrance

Tōei Station (東栄駅, Tōei-eki) is a railway station in the town of Tōei, Kitashitara District, Aichi Prefecture, Japan, operated by Central Japan Railway Company (JR Tōkai).

== Lines ==
Tōei Station is served by the Iida Line, and is located 51.2 kilometers from the starting point of the line at Toyohashi Station.

== Station layout ==
The station has one island platform connected to the station building by a level crossing. The station building has automated ticket machines, TOICA automated turnstiles and is unattended.

=== Platforms ===
1	■ Iida Line	For Chūbu-Tenryū, Iida
2	■ Iida Line	For Toyohashi

== Adjacent stations ==
«	Service	»
Central Japan Railway Company
Iida Line
Mikawa-Kawai	Limited Express "Inaji" (特急「伊那路」)	Urakawa
Ikeba	Local (普通)	Izumma

== Station history ==
Tōei Station was established on December 21, 1933 as Miwamura Station (三輪村駅, Sanshin-Miwa-eki), a passenger station on the now defunct Sanshin Railway. The station name was changed the following year to Sanshin-Miwa Station (三信三輪駅, Miwamura-eki). On August 1, 1943, the Sanshin Railway was nationalized along with several other local lines to form the Iida Line, and the station name was changed again to Mikawa-Nagaoka Station (三河長野駅, Mikawa-Nagaoka-eki). The station assumed its present name on December 20, 1956. Scheduled freight operations were discontinued from February 1, 1984. Along with its division and privatization of JNR on April 1, 1987, the station came under the control and operation of the Central Japan Railway Company.

== Surrounding area ==
- Tōei town center
- Tōei Municipal Hospital

== See also ==
- List of railway stations in Japan
