= Urakawa Station =

Urakawa Station is the name of two train stations in Japan:

- Urakawa Station (Hokkaido) (浦河駅)
- Urakawa Station (Shizuoka) (浦川駅)
