= Ogifushi Station =

Railway station in Urakawa, Hokkaido, Japan

Coordinates: 42.2061°N 142.6895°E

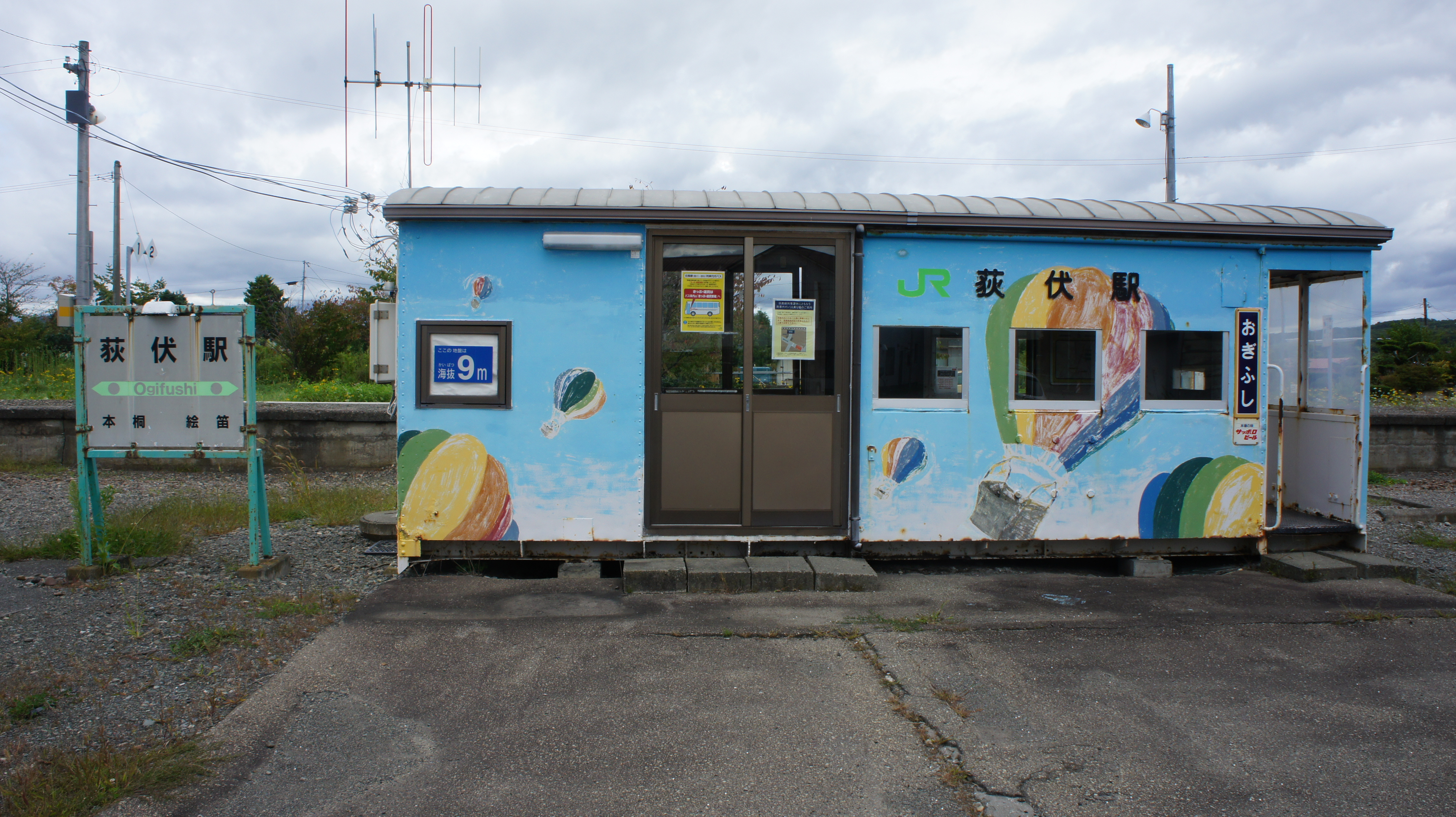
JR Hidaka-Main-Line Ogifushi Station building

Ogifushi Station (荻伏駅, Ogifushi-eki) was a railway station on the Hidaka Main Line in Urakawa, Hokkaido, Japan, operated by the Hokkaido Railway Company (JR Hokkaido).

Services on the 116 km section of the line between Mukawa and Samani have been suspended indefinitely since January 2015 due to storm damage.

== Adjacent stations ==
| « | Service | » |
Hidaka Main Line
| Honkiri | Local | Efue |

== History ==
The station opened on 24 October 1935. With the privatization of Japanese National Railways (JNR) on 1 April 1987, the station came under the control of JR Hokkaido.

== See also ==
- List of railway stations in Japan
