= Hon-Nagashino Station =

Railway station in Shinshiro, Aichi Prefecture, Japan

Hon-Nagashino Station 本長篠駅
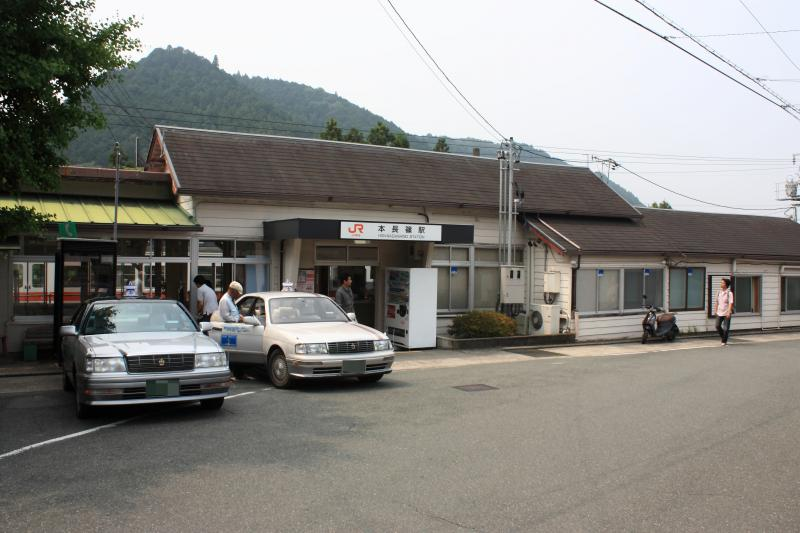
- Hon-Nagashino Station in February 2009

General information
- Location: Kaitsu Nagashino, Shinshiro-shi, Aichi-ken 441-1634; Japan
- Coordinates: 34.9324°N 137.5763°E
- Operator: JR Central
- Line: Iida Line
- Distance: 31.2 kilometers from Toyohashi
- Platforms: 1 island platform

Other information
- Status: Staffed

History
- Opened: February 1, 1923
- Former names: Hōraiji (until 1943)

Passengers
- FY1999: 372 daily
Location
- Location within Aichi Prefecture Location within Japan

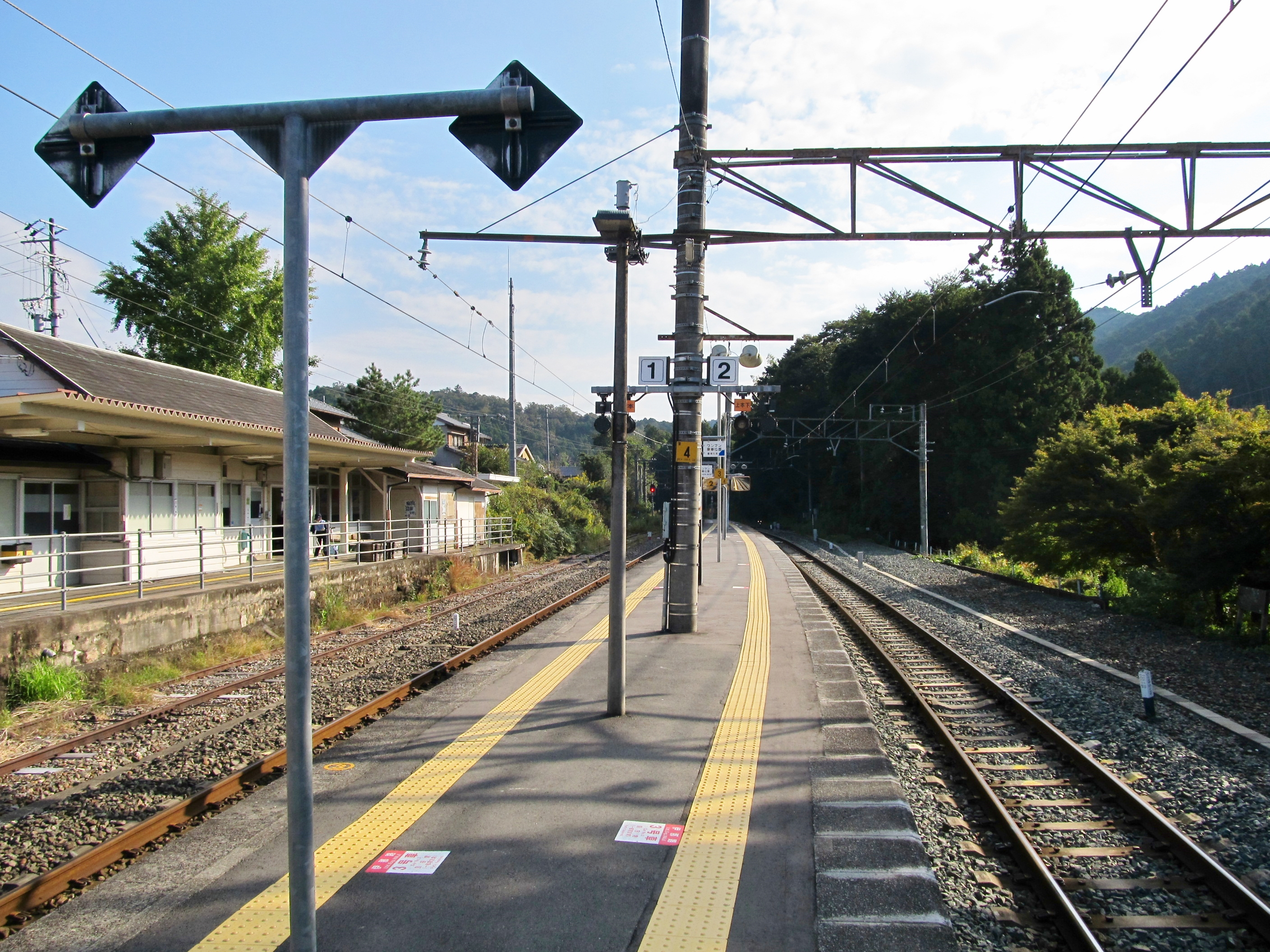
Platform

Hon-Nagashino Station (本長篠駅, Hon-Nagashino-eki) is a railway station in the city of Shinshiro, Aichi Prefecture, Japan, operated by Central Japan Railway Company (JR Tōkai).

== Lines ==
Hon-Nagashino Station is served by the Iida Line, and is located 31.2 kilometers from the starting point of the line at Toyohashi Station.

== Station layout ==
The station has a single island platform. The station building is a one-story wooden structure connected to the platform by a level crossing. The station building is staffed.

=== Platforms ===
| 1 | ■ Iida Line | For Chūbu-Tenryū, Iida |
| 2 | ■ Iida Line | For Toyohashi |

== Adjacent stations ==
| « | Service | » |
Central Japan Railway Company
Iida Line
| Shinshiro | Limited Express "Inaji" (特急「伊那路」) | Yuya-Onsen |
| Nagashinojō | Local (普通) | Mikawa-Ōno |

== Station history ==
Hon-Nagashino Station was established on February 1, 1923 as Hōraiji Station (鳳来寺駅, Hōraiji-eki) on the now-defunct Hōraiji Railway (鳳来寺鉄道, Hōraiji Tetsudō). On March 15, 1929 it was briefly renamed Horaijiguchi Station (鳳来寺口駅, Horaijiguchi-eki) but reverted to its original name only two weeks later. On May 22, 1929, the now defunct Taguchi Line connected to the station. On August 1, 1943, the Horaiji Railway was nationalized along with some other local lines to form the Japanese Government Railways (JGR) Iida Line and the station was renamed to its present name. The Taguchi Line ceased operations in 1969. Scheduled freight operations were discontinued in 1971. Along with its division and privatization of JNR on April 1, 1987, the station came under the control and operation of the Central Japan Railway Company.

== Surrounding area ==
- Hōrai-ji
- Japan National Route 151

== See also ==
- List of railway stations in Japan
