= Ikeba Station =

Railway station in Shinshiro, Aichi Prefecture, Japan

Ikeba Station 池場駅
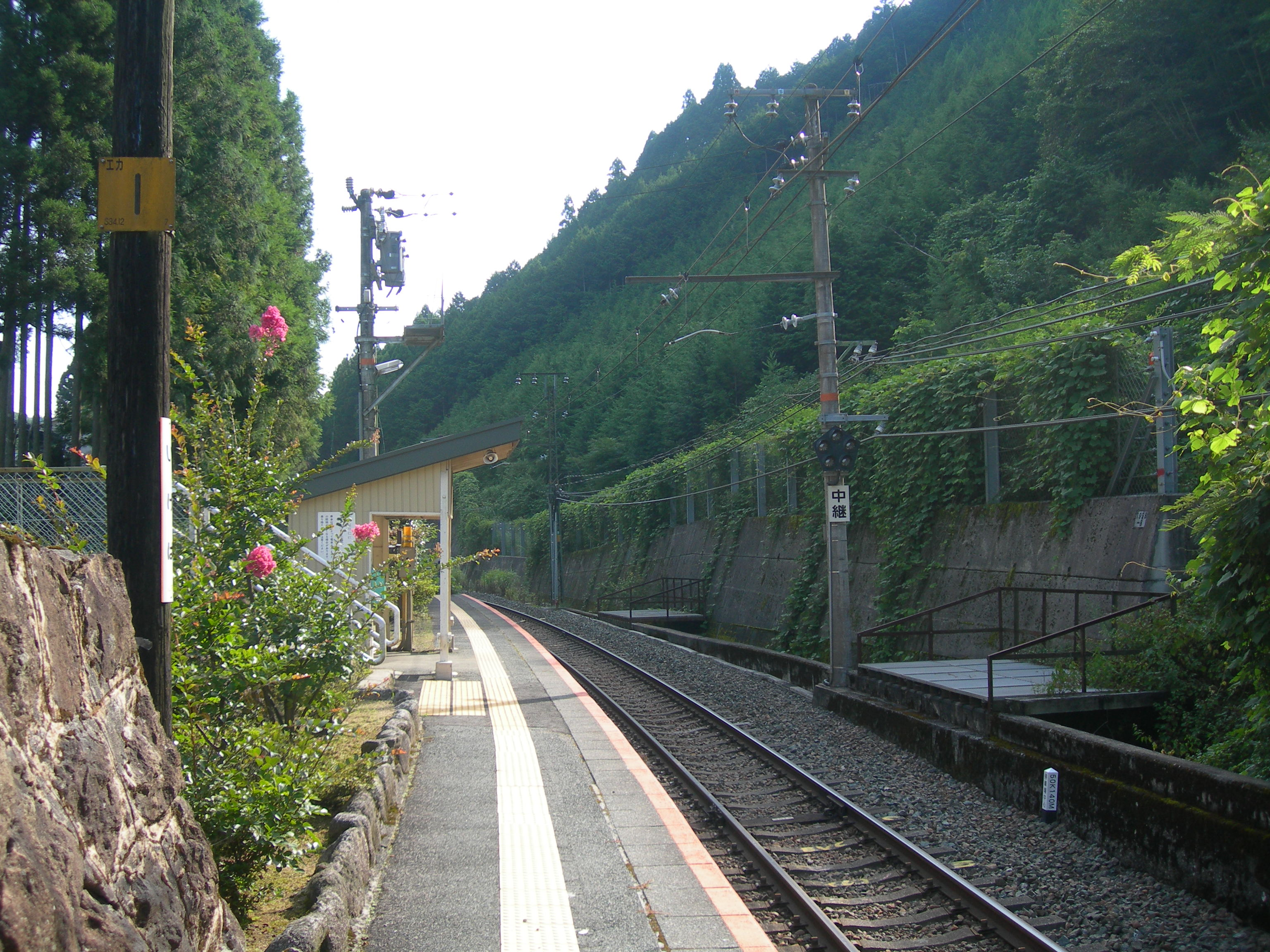
- Ikeba Station in August 2008

General information
- Location: Ikeba Tatsuro 13, Shinshiro-shi, Aichi-ken 441-1602; Japan
- Coordinates: 35.0241°N 137.7045°E
- Operator: JR Central
- Line: Iida Line
- Distance: 50.1 kilometers from Toyohashi
- Platforms: 1 side platform

Other information
- Status: Unstaffed

History
- Opened: December 1, 1946

Passengers
- FY 1999: 10 daily
Location
- Location within Aichi Prefecture Location within Japan

Ikeba Station (池場駅, Ikeba-eki) is a railway station in the city of Shinshiro, Aichi Prefecture, Japan, operated by Central Japan Railway Company (JR Tōkai).

== Lines ==
Ikeba Station is served by the Iida Line, and is located 50.1 kilometers from the starting point of the line at Toyohashi Station.

== Station layout ==
The station has one side platform serving a single bi-directional track. There is no station building, but only a small shelter on the platform. The station is unattended.

== Adjacent stations ==
«	Service	»
Central Japan Railway Company
Iida Line
Limited Express "Inaji" (特急「伊那路」): Does not stop at this station
Mikawa-Kawai	Local (普通)	Tōei

== Station history ==
Ikeba Station was established on November 2, 1936, as the Ikeba Signal Stop (池場停留場, Ikeba Teiryu-jo), on the now defunct Sanshin Railway. On August 1, 1943, the Sanshin Railway was nationalized along with several other local lines to form the Iida Line. On December 1, 1946, it was elevated to a full station and renamed to its present name. Along with its division and privatization of JNR on April 1, 1987, the station came under the control and operation of the Central Japan Railway Company.

== Surrounding area ==
- Japan National Route 151

== See also ==
- List of railway stations in Japan
