= Mikawa-Makihara Station =

Railway station in Shinshiro, Aichi Prefecture, Japan

Mikawa-Makihara Station 三河槙原駅
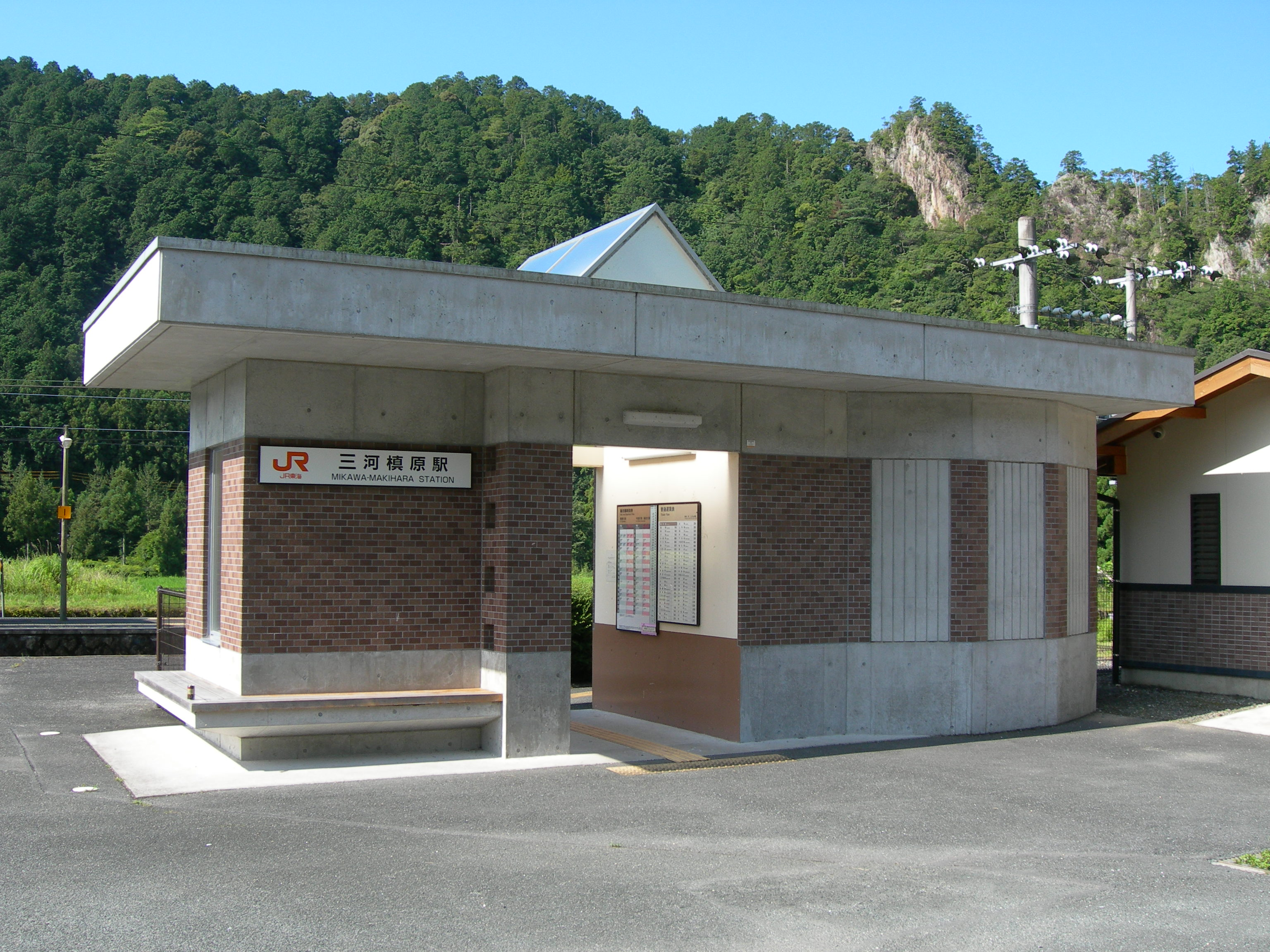
- Mikawa-Makihara Station in 2009

General information
- Location: Dōdei-2 Toyooka, Shinshiro-shi, Aichi-ken 441-1631; Japan
- Coordinates: 34.9891°N 137.6213°E
- Operator: JR Central
- Line: Iida Line
- Distance: 40.6 kilometers from Toyohashi
- Platforms: 1 island platform

Other information
- Status: Unstaffed

History
- Opened: February 1, 1923

Passengers
- FY 1999: 83 daily
Location
- Location within Aichi Prefecture Location within Japan

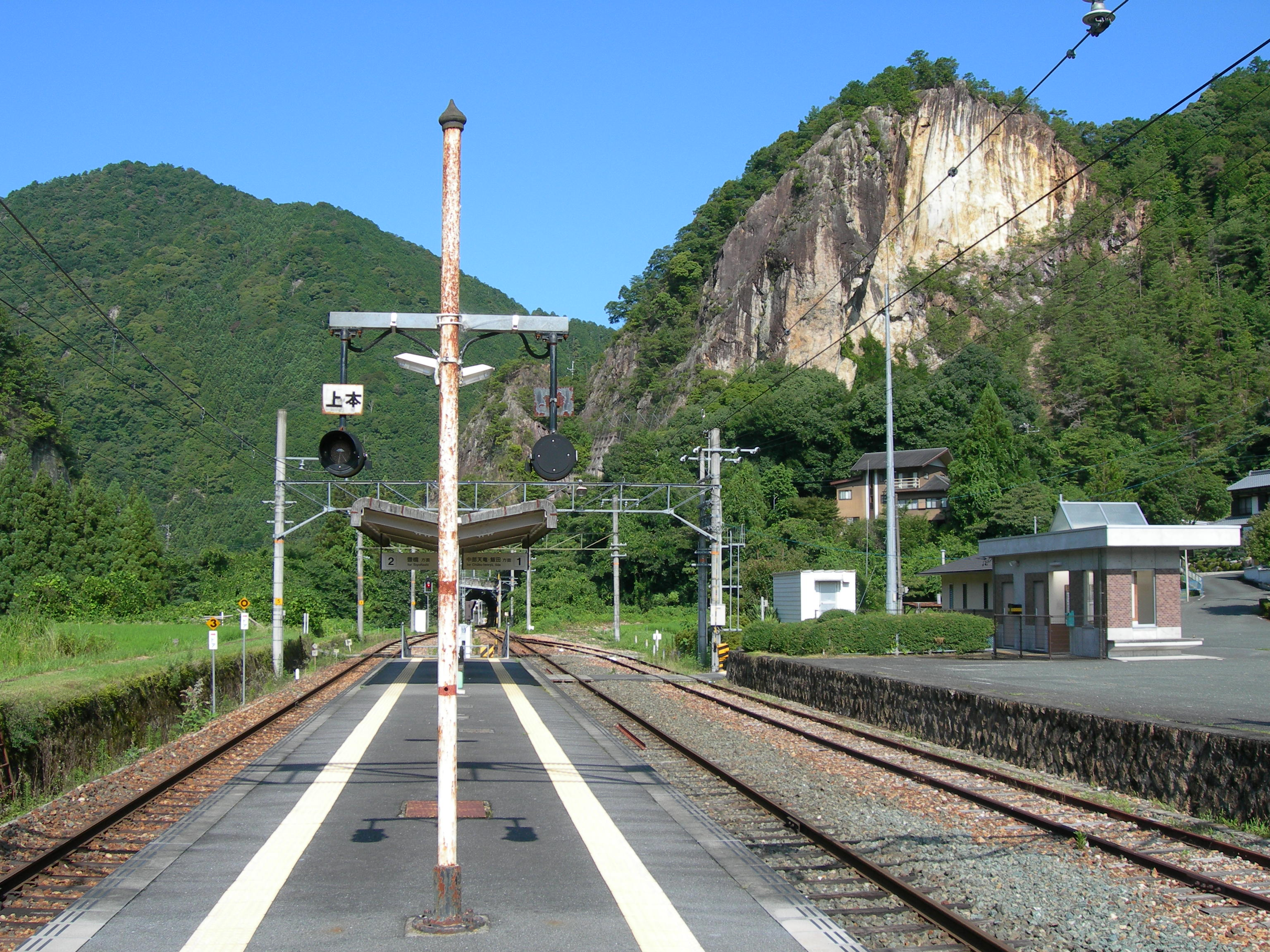
Platform

Mikawa-Makihara Station (三河槙原駅, Mikawa-Makihara-eki) is a railway station in the city of Shinshiro, Aichi Prefecture, Japan, operated by Central Japan Railway Company (JR Tōkai).

== Lines ==
Mikawa-Makihara Station is served by the Iida Line, and is located 40.6 kilometers from the starting point of the line at Toyohashi Station.

== Station layout ==
The station has a single island platform connected to the station building by a level crossing. The station building has automated ticket machines, TOICA automated turnstiles and is unattended.

=== Platforms ===
1	■ Iida Line	For Toyohashi
2	■ Iida Line	For Chūbu-Tenryū, Iida

== Adjacent stations ==
«	Service	»
Central Japan Railway Company
Iida Line
Limited Express "Inaji" (特急「伊那路」): Does not stop at this station
Yuya-Onsen	Local (普通)	Kakidaira

== Station history ==
Mikawa-Makihara Station was established on February 1, 1923 as a station on the now-defunct Hōraiji Railway (鳳来寺鉄道, Hōraiji Tetsudō). On August 1, 1943, The Horaiji Railway and the Sanshin Railway were nationalized along with some other local lines to form the Japanese Government Railways (JGR) Iida Line. Scheduled freight operations were discontinued in 1971. The station has been unattended since 1984. Along with its division and privatization of JNR on April 1, 1987, the station came under the control and operation of the Central Japan Railway Company.

== Surrounding area ==
The station is located in an isolated rural area.

== See also ==
- List of railway stations in Japan
