= Mikawa-Ōno Station =

Railway station in Shinshiro, Aichi Prefecture, Japan

Mikawa-Ōno Station 三河大野駅
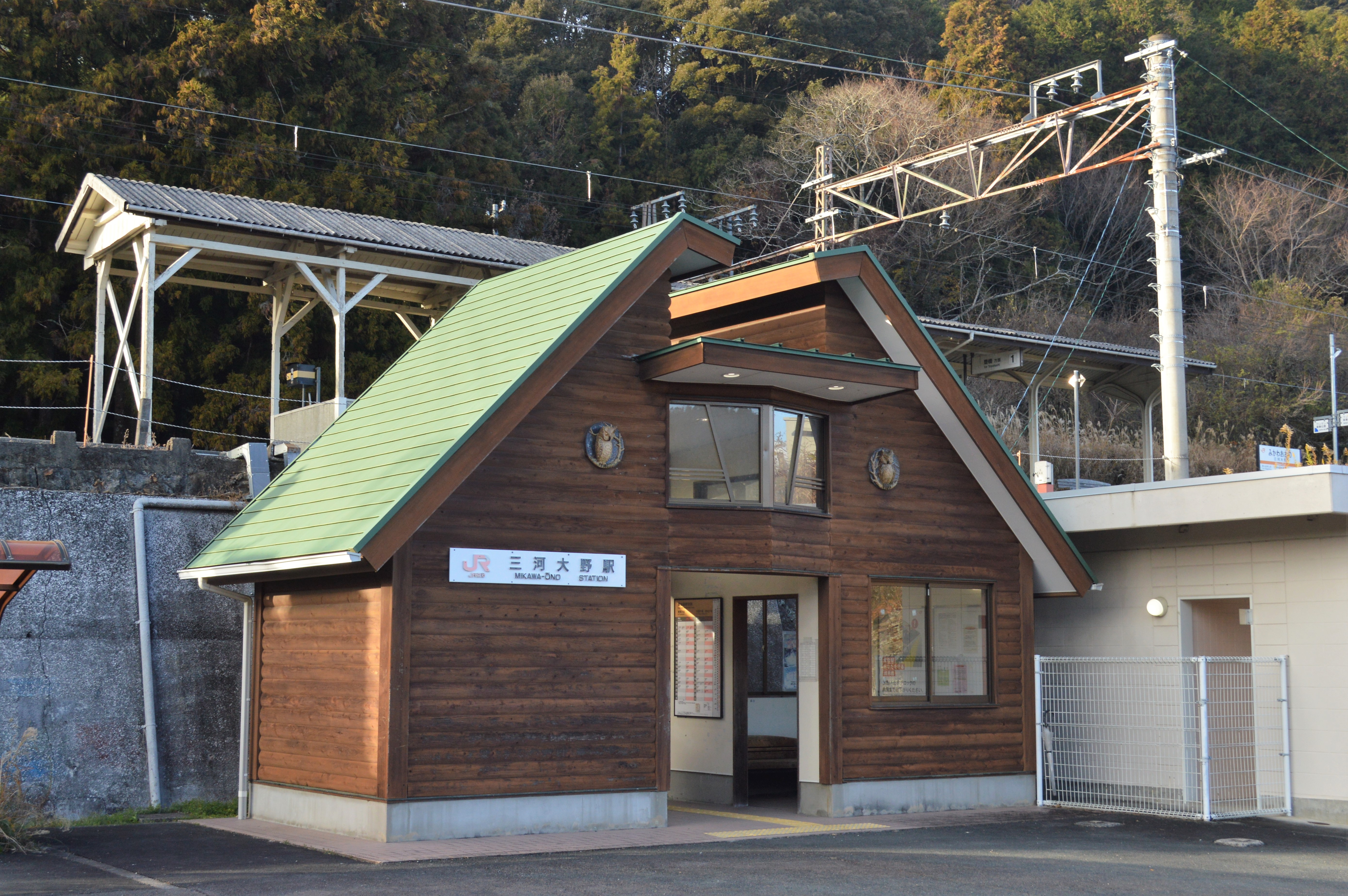
- Mikawa-Ōno Station in December 2018

General information
- Location: Sotogaitsu Tomisaka, Shinshiro-shi, Aichi-ken 441-1632; Japan
- Coordinates: 34.9516°N 137.6039°E
- Operator: JR Central
- Line: Iida Line
- Distance: 35.6 kilometers from Toyohashi
- Platforms: 1 island platform

Other information
- Status: Unstaffed

History
- Opened: February 1, 1923

Passengers
- FY 2002: 231 daily
Location
- Location within Aichi Prefecture Location within Japan

Mikawa-Ōno Station (三河大野駅, Mikawa-Ōno-eki) is a railway station in the city of Shinshiro, Aichi Prefecture, Japan, operated by Central Japan Railway Company (JR Tōkai).

== Lines ==
Mikawa-Ōno Station is served by the Iida Line, and is located 35.6 kilometers from the starting point of the line at Toyohashi Station.

== Station layout ==
The station has a single island platform. The station building is designed to resemble a mountain hut and has automated ticket machines, TOICA automated turnstiles and is unattended.

=== Platforms ===
1	■ Iida Line	For Toyohashi
2	■ Iida Line	For Chūbu-Tenryū, Iida

== Adjacent stations ==
«	Service	»
Central Japan Railway Company
Iida Line
Limited Express "Inaji" (特急「伊那路」): Does not stop at this station
Hon-Nagashino	Local (普通)	Yuya-Onsen

== Station history ==
Mikawa-Ōno Station was established on February 1, 1923, as a station on the now-defunct Hōraiji Railway (鳳来寺鉄道, Hōraiji Tetsudō). On August 1, 1943, the Horaiji Railway and the Sanshin Railway were nationalized along with some other local lines to form the Japanese Government Railways (JGR) Iida Line. Scheduled freight operations were discontinued in 1971. Along with its division and privatization of JNR on April 1, 1987, the station came under the control and operation of the Central Japan Railway Company (JR Tōkai). The station has been unattended since 1991. A new station building was completed in 1996.

== See also ==
- List of railway stations in Japan
