= Izumma Station =

Railway station in Hamamatsu, Japan

Izumma Station 出馬駅
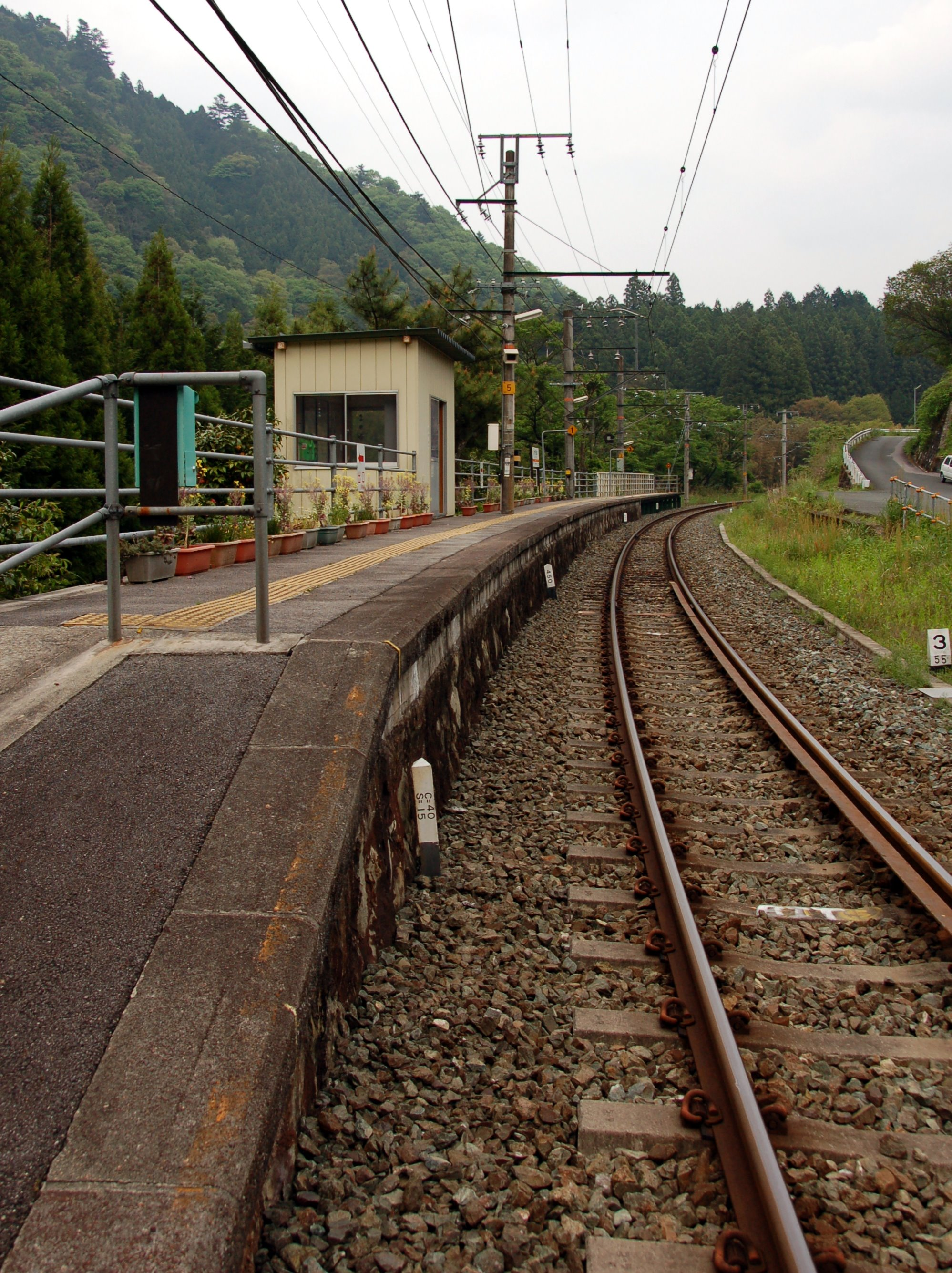
- Izumma Station in May 2007

General information
- Location: Sakuma-cho Urakawa 1997, Tenryū-ku, Hamamatsu-shi, Shizuoka-ken; Japan
- Coordinates: 35°02′58.75″N 137°44′41.63″E
- Operator: JR Central
- Line: Iida Line
- Distance: 55.4 km from Toyohashi
- Platforms: 1 side platform

Other information
- Status: Unstaffed

History
- Opened: November 11, 1934

Passengers
- FY2017: 2 (daily)
Location
- Location within Shizuoka Prefecture Location within Japan

Izumma Station (出馬駅, Izumma-eki) is a railway station on the Iida Line in Tenryū-ku, Hamamatsu, Shizuoka Prefecture, Japan, operated by Central Japan Railway Company (JR Central).

== Lines ==
Izumma Station is served by the Iida Line and is 55.4 kilometers from the starting point of the line at Toyohashi Station.

== Station layout ==
The station has one ground-level side platform serving a single bi-directional track, built on a gentle curve. There is no station building, but only a weather shelter on the platform. The station is unattended.

== Adjacent stations ==
| « | Service | » |
Iida Line
Limited Express "Inaji" (特急「伊那路」): Does not stop at this station
| Tōei | Local (普通) | Kamiichiba |

== History ==
Izumma Station was established on November 11, 1934, as a passenger station on the now defunct Sanshin Railway. On August 1, 1943, the Sanshin Railway was nationalized along with several other local lines to form the Iida line. Along with its division and privatization of JNR on April 1, 1987, the station came under the control and operation of the Central Japan Railway Company.

== Passenger statistics ==
In fiscal 2017, the station was used by an average of 2 passengers daily (boarding passengers only).

== Surrounding area ==
The station is located in an isolated rural area.

== See also ==
- List of railway stations in Japan
