= Hayase Station =

Railway station in Hamamatsu, Japan

Hayase Station 早瀬駅
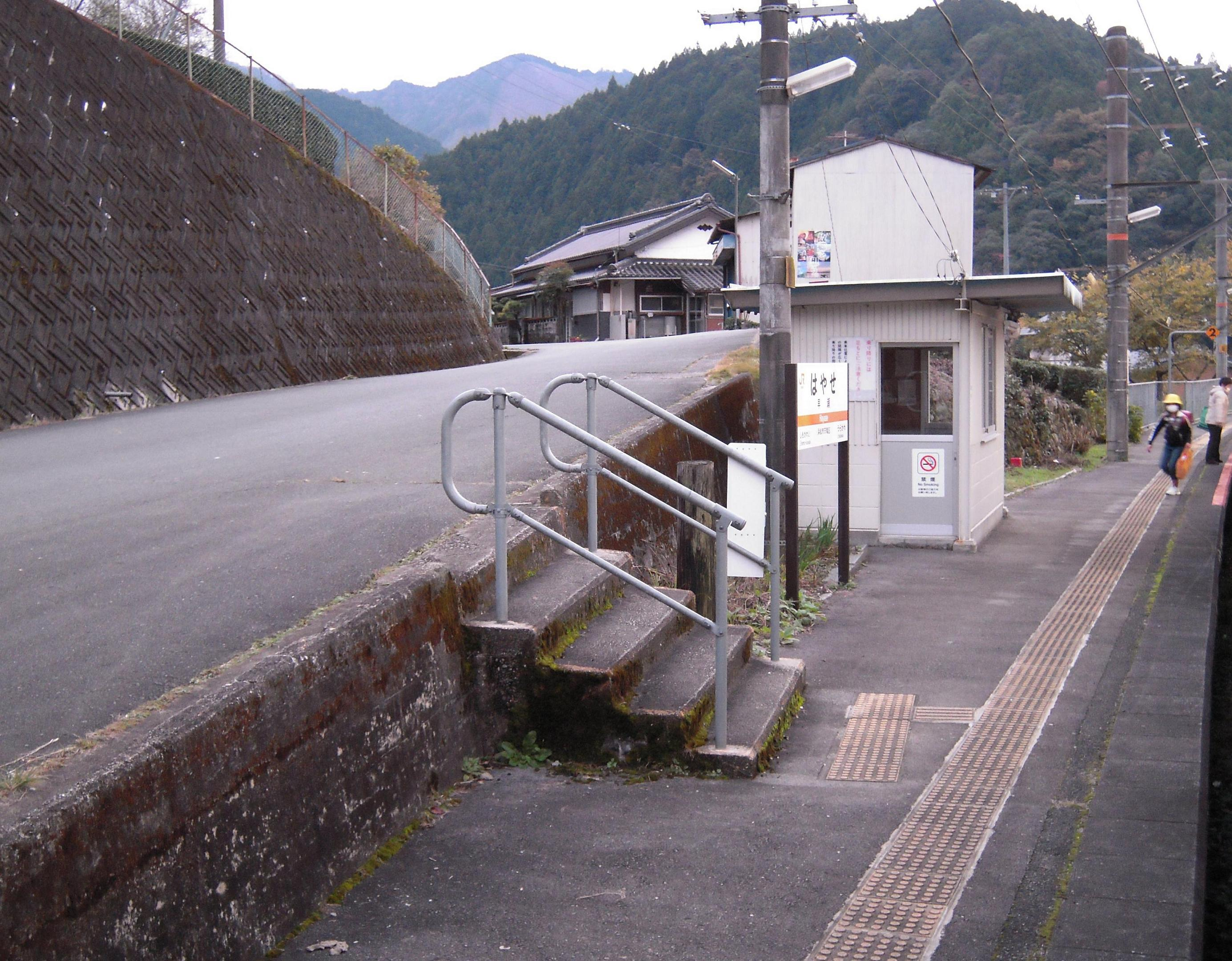
- Hayase Station in November 2009

General information
- Location: 431 - 3906, Tenryū-ku, Hamamatsu-shi, Shizuoka-ken; Japan
- Coordinates: 35.060529°N 137.774979°E
- Operator: JR Central
- Line: Iida Line
- Distance: 58.5 km from Toyohashi
- Platforms: 1 side platform

Other information
- Status: Unstaffed

History
- Opened: December 1, 1946
- Former names: Hayase Signal Depot (from 1935)

Passengers
- FY2017: 9 (daily)
Location
- Location within Shizuoka Prefecture Location within Japan

Hayase Station (早瀬駅, Hayase-eki) is a railway station on the Iida Line in Tenryū-ku, Hamamatsu, Shizuoka Prefecture, Japan, operated by Central Japan Railway Company (JR Central).

== Lines ==
Hayase Station is served by the Iida Line and is 58.5 kilometers from the starting point of the line at Toyohashi Station.

== Station layout ==
The station has one ground-level side platform serving a single bi-directional track. There is no station building. The station is not attended.

== Adjacent stations ==
| « | Service | » |
Iida Line
Limited Express "Inaji" (特急「伊那路」): Does not stop at this station
| Urakawa | Local (普通) | Shimokawai |

== Station history ==
Hayase Station was established on May 10, 1935 as the Hayase Signal Depot on the now defunct Sanshin Railway. On August 1, 1943, the Sanshin Railway was nationalized along with several other local lines to form the Iida line. Hayase was elevated to a full station on December 1, 1946. Along with the division and privatization of JNR on April 1, 1987, the station came under the control and operation of the Central Japan Railway Company.

== Passenger statistics ==
In fiscal 2016, the station was used by an average of 9 passengers daily (boarding passengers only).

== Surrounding area ==
- National Route 473

== See also ==
- List of railway stations in Japan
