= Yuya-Onsen Station =

Railway station in Shinshiro, Aichi Prefecture, Japan

Yuya-Onsen Station 湯谷温泉駅
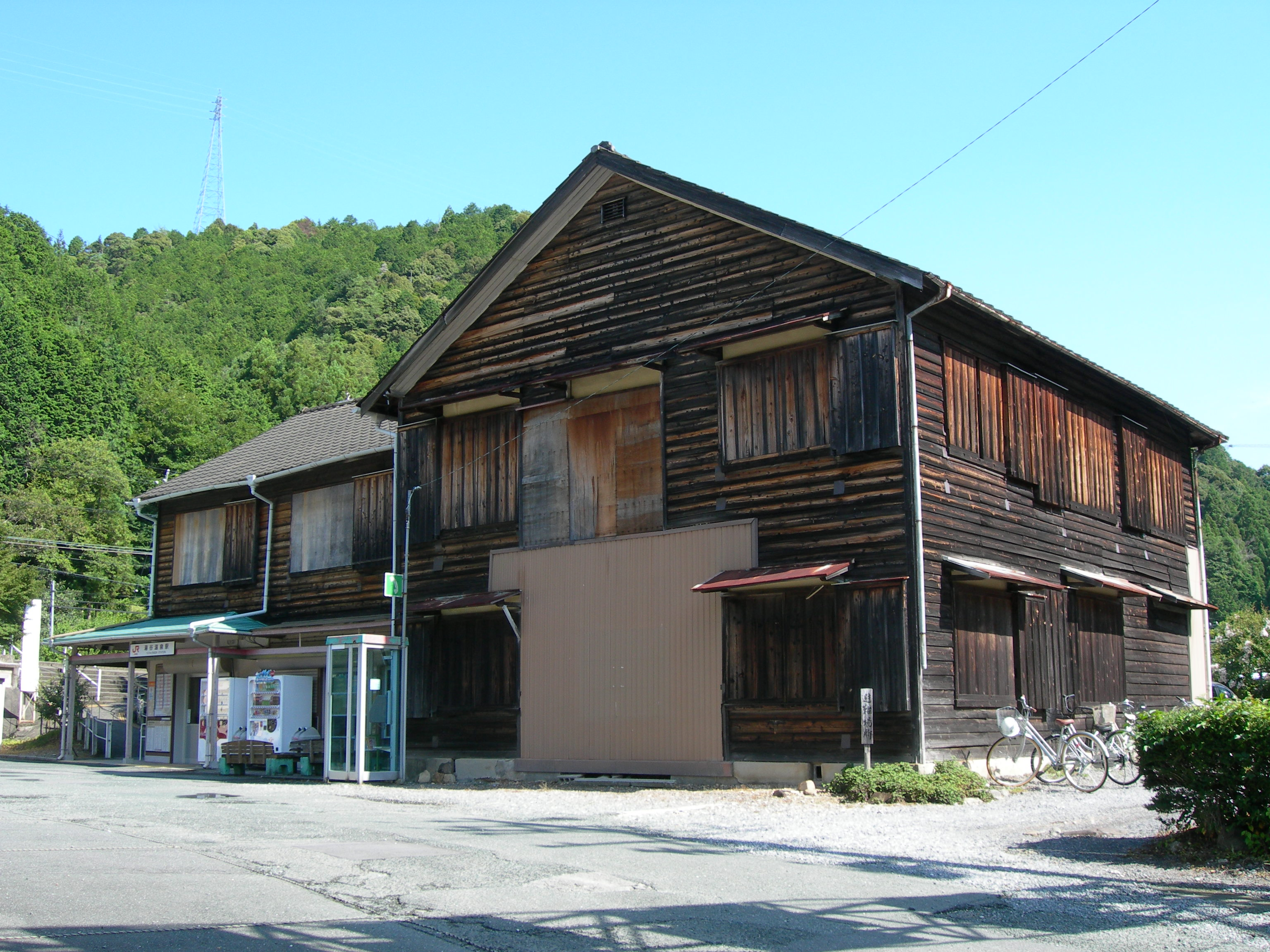
- Yuya-Onsen Station in July 2009

General information
- Location: Takiue-15 Toyooka, Shinshiro-shi, Aichi-ken 441-1631; Japan
- Coordinates: 34.9703°N 137.6132°E
- Operator: JR Central
- Line: Iida Line
- Distance: 38.0 kilometers from Toyohashi
- Platforms: 1 side platform

Other information
- Status: Unstaffed

History
- Opened: February 1, 1923
- Former names: Yuya (until 1991)

Passengers
- FY 1999: 210 daily
Location
- Location within Aichi Prefecture Location within Japan

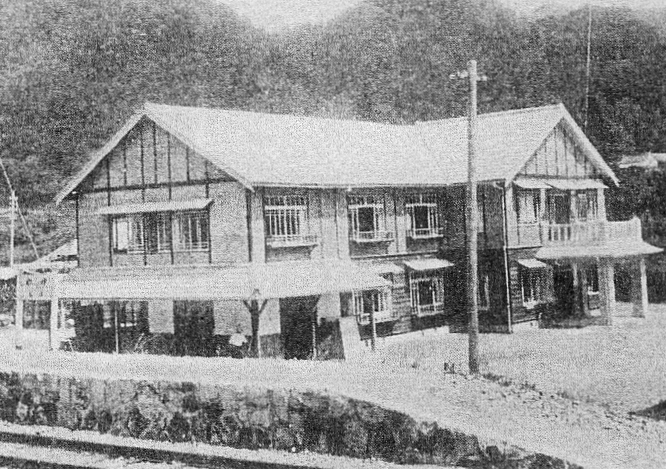
Yuya-Onsen Station in 1926

Yuya-Onsen Station (湯谷温泉駅, Yuya-Onsen-eki) is a railway station in the city of Shinshiro, Aichi Prefecture, Japan, operated by Central Japan Railway Company (JR Tōkai).

== Lines ==
Yuya-Onsen Station is served by the Iida Line, and is located 38.0 kilometers from the starting point of the line at Toyohashi Station.

== Station layout ==
The station has a single side platform serving one bi-directional track. The station building is unattended.

== Adjacent stations ==
| « | Service | » |
Central Japan Railway Company
Iida Line
| Hon-Nagashino | Limited Express "Inaji" (特急「伊那路」) | Chūbu-Tenryū |
| Mikawa-Ōno | Local (普通) | Mikawa-Makihara |

== Station history ==
Yuya-Onsen Station was established on February 1, 1923 as Yuya Signal on the now-defunct Hōraiji Railway (鳳来寺鉄道, Hōraiji Tetsudō). On August 1, 1943, the Horaiji Railway and the Sanshin Railway were nationalized along with some other local lines to form the Japanese Government Railways (JGR) Iida Line, and Yuya Signal was elevated to Yuya Station (湯谷温泉駅, Yuya-eki). Scheduled freight operations were discontinued in 1971. The station has been unattended since 1985. Along with its division and privatization of JNR on April 1, 1987, the station came under the control and operation of the Central Japan Railway Company.

== Surrounding area ==
- Yuya onsen hot spring resort

== See also ==
- List of railway stations in Japan
