= Kakidaira Station =

Railway station in Shinshiro, Aichi Prefecture, Japan

Kakidaira Station 柿平駅
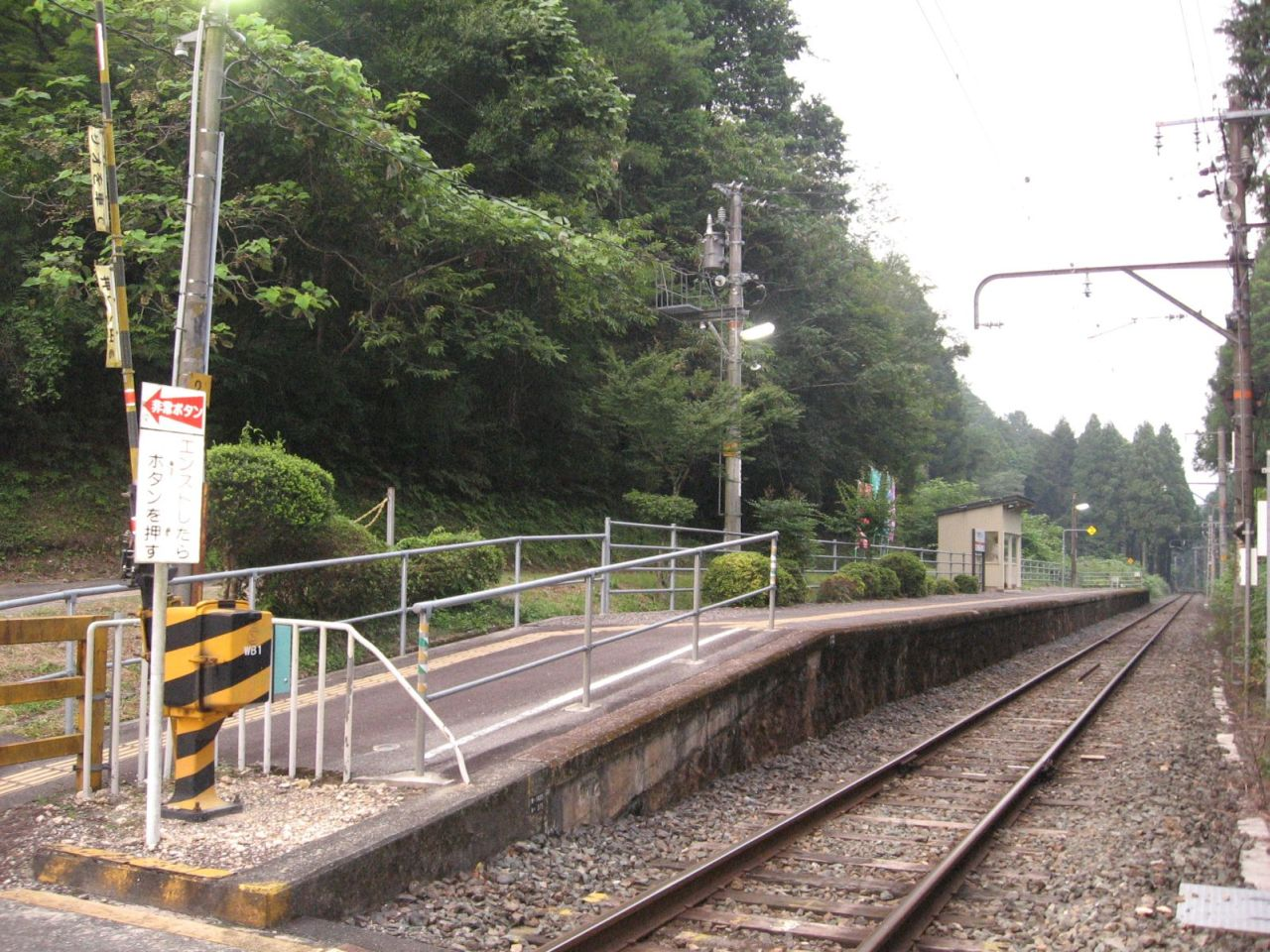
- Kakidaira Station in August 2006

General information
- Location: Toyooka, Shinshiro-shi, Aichi-ken 441-1631; Japan
- Coordinates: 34.9908°N 137.6443°E
- Operator: JR Central
- Line: Iida Line
- Distance: 42.9 kilometers from Toyohashi
- Platforms: 1 side platform

Other information
- Status: Unstaffed

History
- Opened: February 15, 1950

Passengers
- FY 1999: 21 daily
Location
- Location within Aichi Prefecture Location within Japan

Kakidaira Station (柿平駅, Kakidaira-eki) is a railway station in the city of Shinshiro, Aichi Prefecture, Japan, operated by Central Japan Railway Company (JR Tōkai).

== Lines ==
Kakidaira Station is served by the Iida Line, and is located 42.9 kilometers from the starting point of the line at Toyohashi Station.

== Station layout ==
The station has one side platform serving a single bi-directional track. There is no station building, but only a small shelter on the platform. The station is unattended.

== Adjacent stations ==
«	Service	»
Central Japan Railway Company
Iida Line
Limited Express "Inaji" (特急「伊那路」): Does not stop at this station
Mikawa-Makihara	Local (普通)	Mikawa-Kawai

== Station history ==
Kakidaira Station was established on May 5, 1923, as Kakidaira Signal on the now-defunct Hōraiji Railway (鳳来寺鉄道, Hōraiji Tetsudō). On August 1, 1943, The Horaiji Railway and the Sanshin Railway were nationalized along with some other local lines to form the Japanese Government Railways (JGR) Iida Line. Kakidaira was elevated to a full station on February 15, 1950. Along with its division and privatization of JNR on April 1, 1987, the station came under the control and operation of the Central Japan Railway Company.

== Surrounding area ==
The station is located in a rural area.

== See also ==
- List of railway stations in Japan
