= Kamiichiba Station =

Railway station in Hamamatsu, Japan

Kamiichiba Station 上市場駅
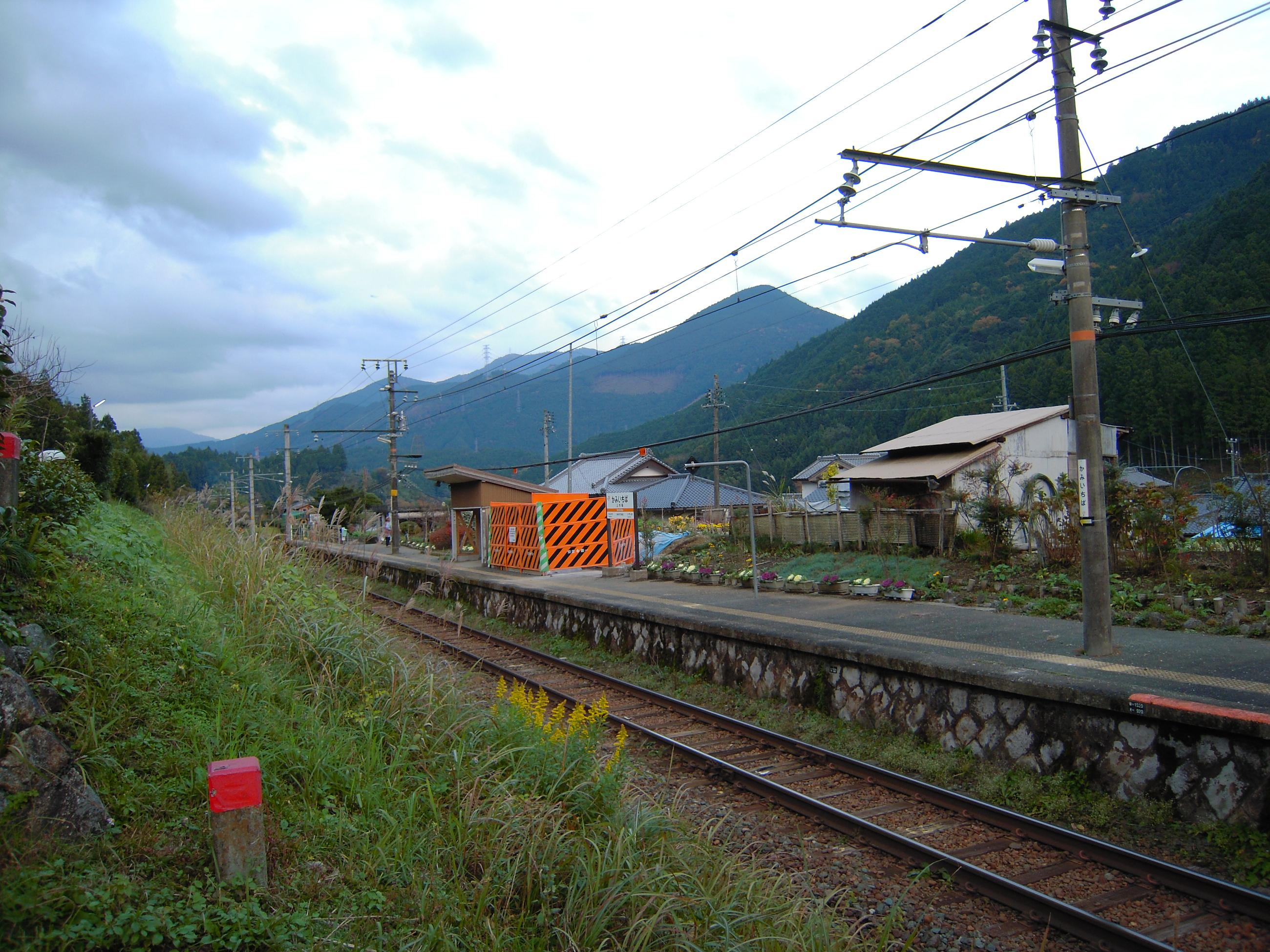
- Kamiichiba Station in November 2009

General information
- Location: Sakuma-cho Urakawa 2541, Tenryū-ku, Hamamatsu-shi, Shizuoka-ken; Japan
- Coordinates: 35.050077°N 137.752295°E
- Operator: JR Central
- Line: Iida Line
- Distance: 56.0 km from Toyohashi
- Platforms: 1 side platform

Other information
- Status: Unstaffed

History
- Opened: December 1, 1946
- Former names: Kamiichiba Signal Depot (from 1935)

Passengers
- FY2017: 7 (daily)
Location
- Location within Shizuoka Prefecture Location within Japan

Kamiichiba Station (上市場駅, Kamiichiba-eki) is a railway station on the Iida Line in Tenryū-ku, Hamamatsu, Shizuoka Prefecture, Japan, operated by Central Japan Railway Company (JR Central).

== Lines ==
Kamiichiba Station is served by the Iida Line and is 56.0 kilometers from the starting point of the line at Toyohashi Station.

== Station layout ==
The station has one ground-level side platform serving a single bi-directional track. The station is unattended.

== Adjacent stations ==
«	Service	»
Iida Line
Limited Express "Inaji" (特急「伊那路」): Does not stop at this station
Izumma	Local (普通)	Urakawa

== History ==
Kamiichiba Station was established on June 12, 1935 as the Sanshin Kamiichiba Signal Depot on the now defunct Sanshin Railway. On August 1, 1943, the Sanshin Railway was nationalized along with several other local lines to form the Iida Line. It was elevated to a passenger station on December 1, 1946. Along with its division and privatization of JNR on April 1, 1987, the station came under the control and operation of the Central Japan Railway Company.

== Passenger statistics ==
In fiscal 2016, the station was used by an average of 7 passengers daily (boarding passengers only).

== Surrounding area ==
The station is located in a rural area.

== See also ==
- List of railway stations in Japan
