= Mikawa-Kawai Station =

Railway station in Shinshiro, Aichi Prefecture, Japan

Mikawa-Kawai Station 三河川合駅
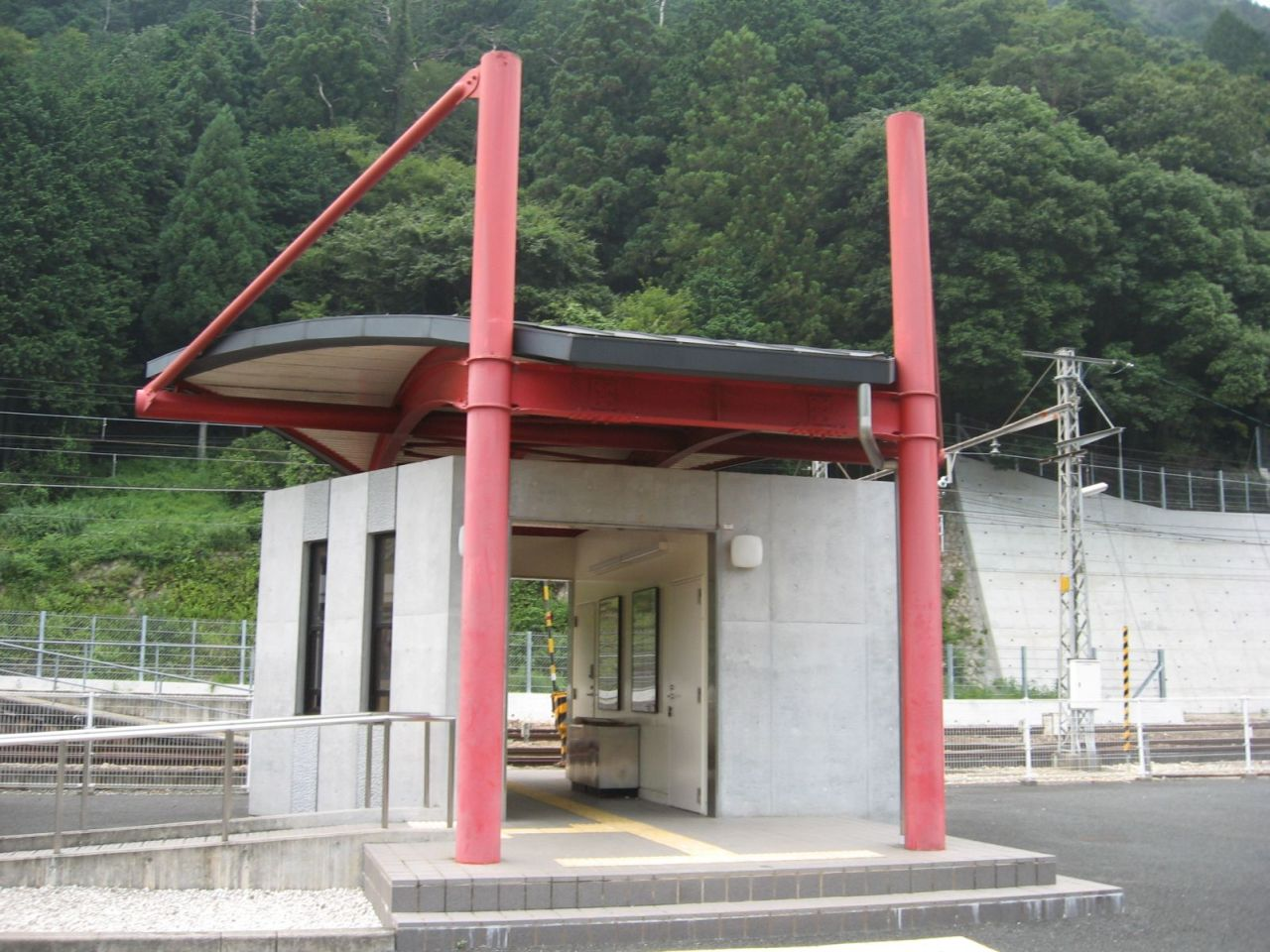
- Mikawa-Kawai Station in August 2006

General information
- Location: Kawai koshi 6, Shinshiro-shi, Aichi-ken 441-1601; Japan
- Coordinates: 35.0011°N 137.6630°E
- Operator: JR Central
- Line: Iida Line
- Distance: 45.2 kilometers from Toyohashi
- Platforms: 1 island platform

Other information
- Status: Unstaffed

History
- Opened: February 1, 1923

Passengers
- FY 2017: 28 daily
Location
- Location within Aichi Prefecture Location within Japan

Mikawa-Kawai Station (三河川合駅, Mikawa-Kawai-eki) is a railway station in the city of Shinshiro, Aichi Prefecture, Japan, operated by Central Japan Railway Company (JR Tōkai).

== Summary ==
The area around Mikawagai Station in 1976. The station is located in the center left of the photo. Uren River is on the left and top of the photo. Based on maps and aerial images from the Ministry of Land, Infrastructure, Transport and Tourism of Japan.

Toei Station is an intermediate station on the Iida Line connecting Toyohashi Station (Aichi Prefecture) and Tatsuno Station (Nagano Prefecture). The station is located northeast of Shin-ichi City. At the time, it served as a transfer station, transporting building materials to the neighboring Uren Dam; now it is purely a passenger station.

This station opened in 1923 (Taisho 12). Later, it became the boundary station between the Hōraiji Railway and the Sanshin Railway. In 1943 (Showa 18), both railway lines were nationalized, becoming a station on the JR Iida Line. In 1987 (Showa 62), the station was taken over by JR Central.

== Lines ==
Mikawa-Kawai Station is served by the Iida Line, and is located 45.2 kilometers from the starting point of the line at Toyohashi Station.

== Station layout ==
The station has one island platform connected to the station building by a level crossing. The station is unattended.

=== Platforms ===
1	■ Iida Line	For Toyohashi
2	■ Iida Line	For Chūbu-Tenryū, Iida

== Adjacent stations ==
«	Service	»
Central Japan Railway Company
Iida Line
Limited Express "Inaji" (特急「伊那路」): Does not stop at this station
Kakidaira	Local (普通)	Ikeba

== Station history ==
Mikawa-Kawai Station was established on February 1, 1923, as a station on the now-defunct Hōraiji Railway (鳳来寺鉄道, Hōraiji Tetsudō). The Sanshin Railway began operations to this station from December 21, 1933. On August 1, 1943, both lines were nationalized along with some other local lines to form the Japanese Government Railways (JGR) Iida Line. All freight operations were discontinued by 1966. The station has been unattended since November 1, 1986. Along with its division and privatization of JNR on April 1, 1987, the station came under the control and operation of the Central Japan Railway Company.

== Surrounding area ==
- Toyokawa River
- Ure Dam

== See also ==
- List of railway stations in Japan
