= Urakawa Station (Shizuoka) =

Railway station in Hamamatsu, Japan

Urakawa Station 浦川駅
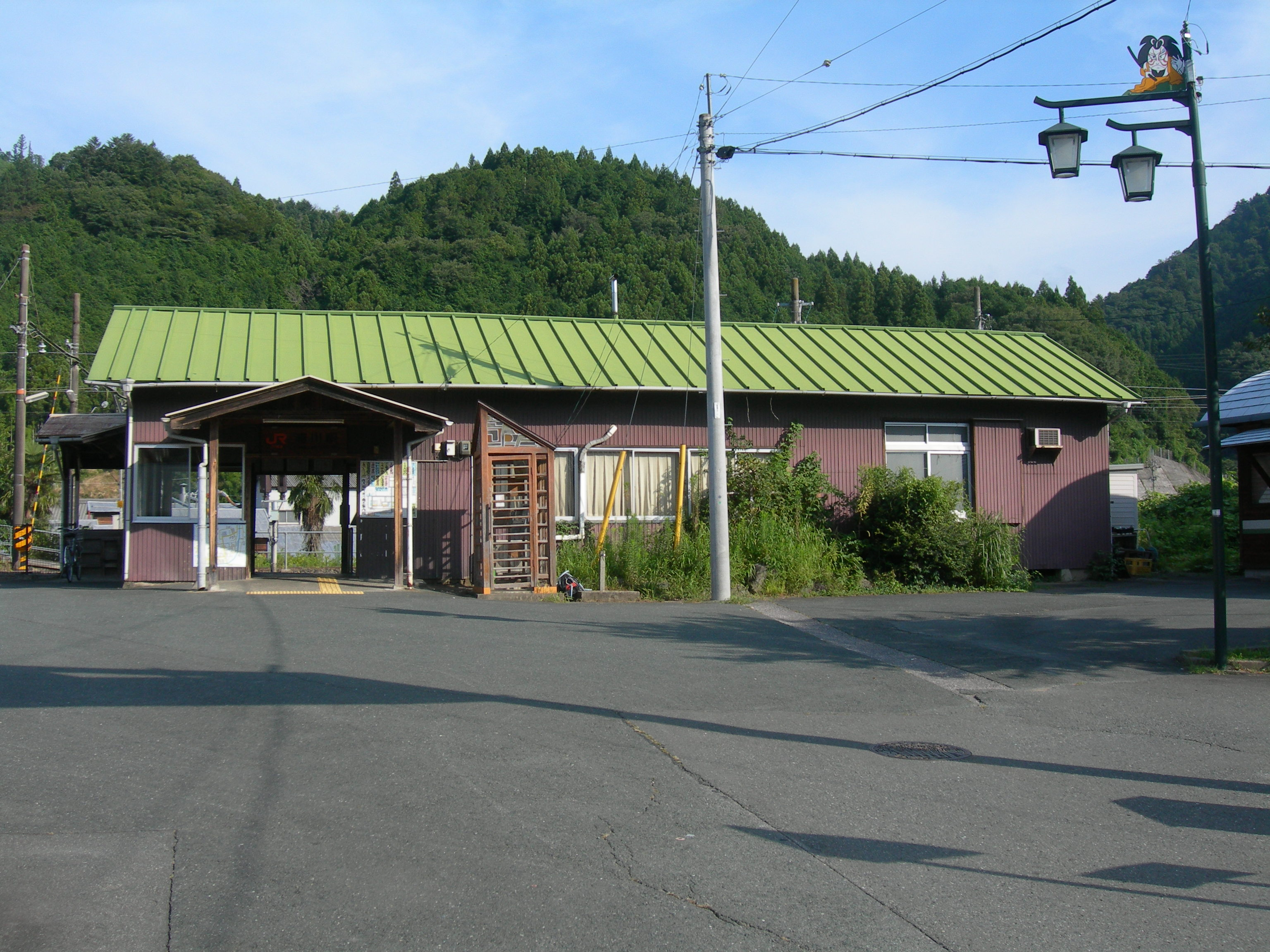
- Urakawa Station in August 2008

General information
- Location: Sakuma-cho, Urakawa 2820, Tenryū-ku, Hamamatsu-shi, Shizuoka-ken; Japan
- Coordinates: 35.056439°N 137.764003°E
- Operator: JR Central
- Line: Iida Line
- Distance: 57.3 km from Toyohashi
- Platforms: 1 island platform

Other information
- Status: Unstaffed

History
- Opened: November 11, 1934

Passengers
- FY2017: 60 (daily)
Location
- Location within Shizuoka Prefecture Location within Japan

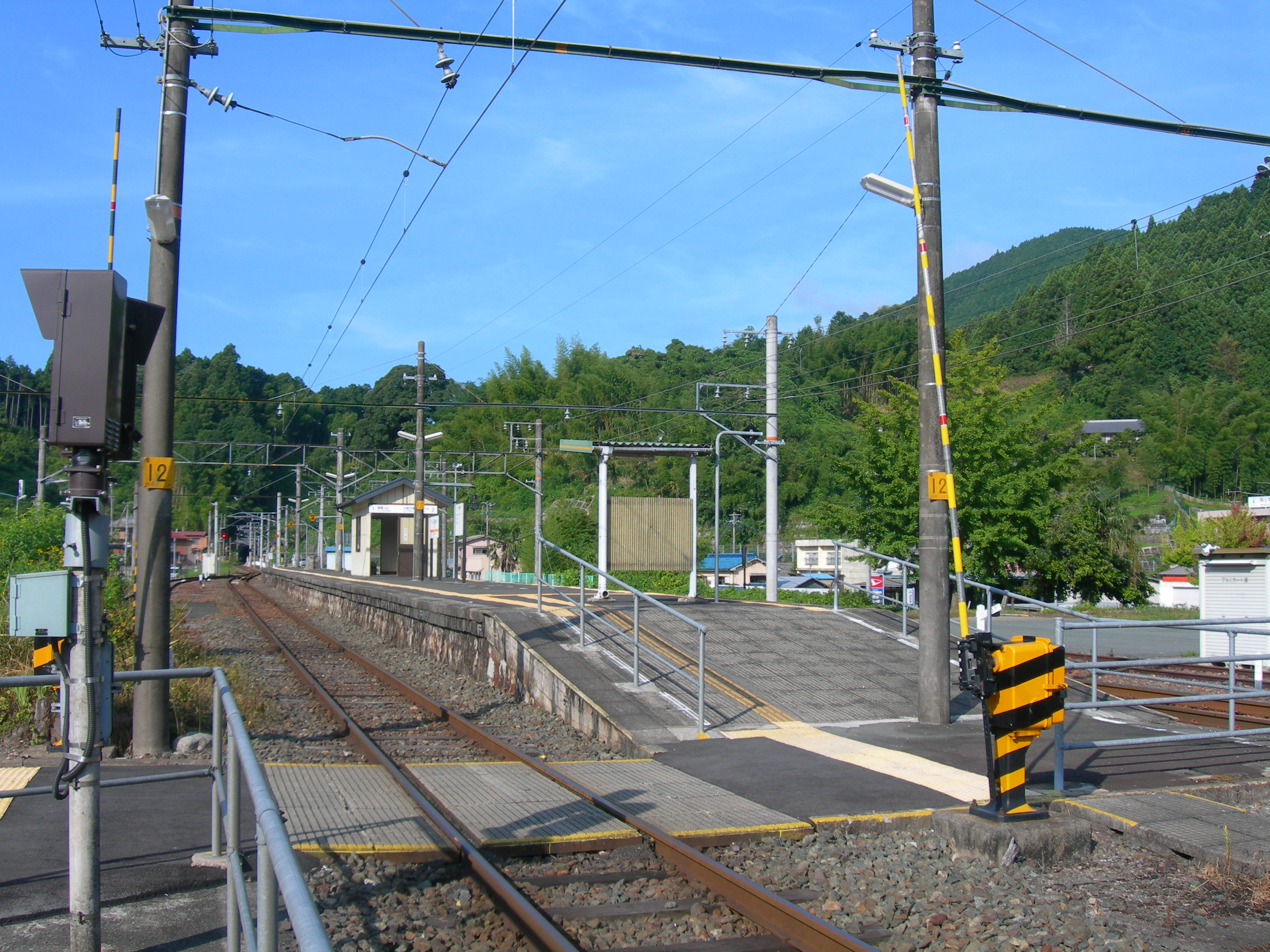
Platform

Urakawa Station (浦川駅, Urakawa-eki) is a railway station on the Iida Line in Tenryū-ku, Hamamatsu, Shizuoka Prefecture, Japan, operated by Central Japan Railway Company (JR Central).

== Lines ==
Urakawa Station is served by the Iida Line and is 57.3 kilometers from the starting point of the line at Toyohashi Station.

== Station layout ==
The station has one ground-level island platform connected to the station building by a level crossing. The station is unattended.

=== Platforms ===
1	■ Iida Line	For Toyohashi
2	■ Iida Line	For Iida

== Adjacent stations ==
«	Service	»
Iida Line
Limited Express "Inaji" (特急「伊那路」): Does not stop at this station
Kamiichiba	Local (普通)	Hayase

== Station History ==
Urakawa Station was established on November 11, 1934, as a station on the now defunct Sanshin Railway. On August 1, 1943, the Sanshin Railway was nationalized along with several other local lines to form the Iida line. Scheduled freight services were discontinued from 1980. Along with its division and privatization of JNR on April 1, 1987, the station came under the control and operation of the Central Japan Railway Company. The station has been unstaffed since 1991.

== Passenger statistics ==
In fiscal 2017, the station was used by an average of 60 passengers daily (boarding passengers only).

== Surrounding area ==
- National Route 473
- Urakawa Elementary School

== See also ==
- List of railway stations in Japan
