= Kamiyachō Shareo =

Underground city in Hiroshima

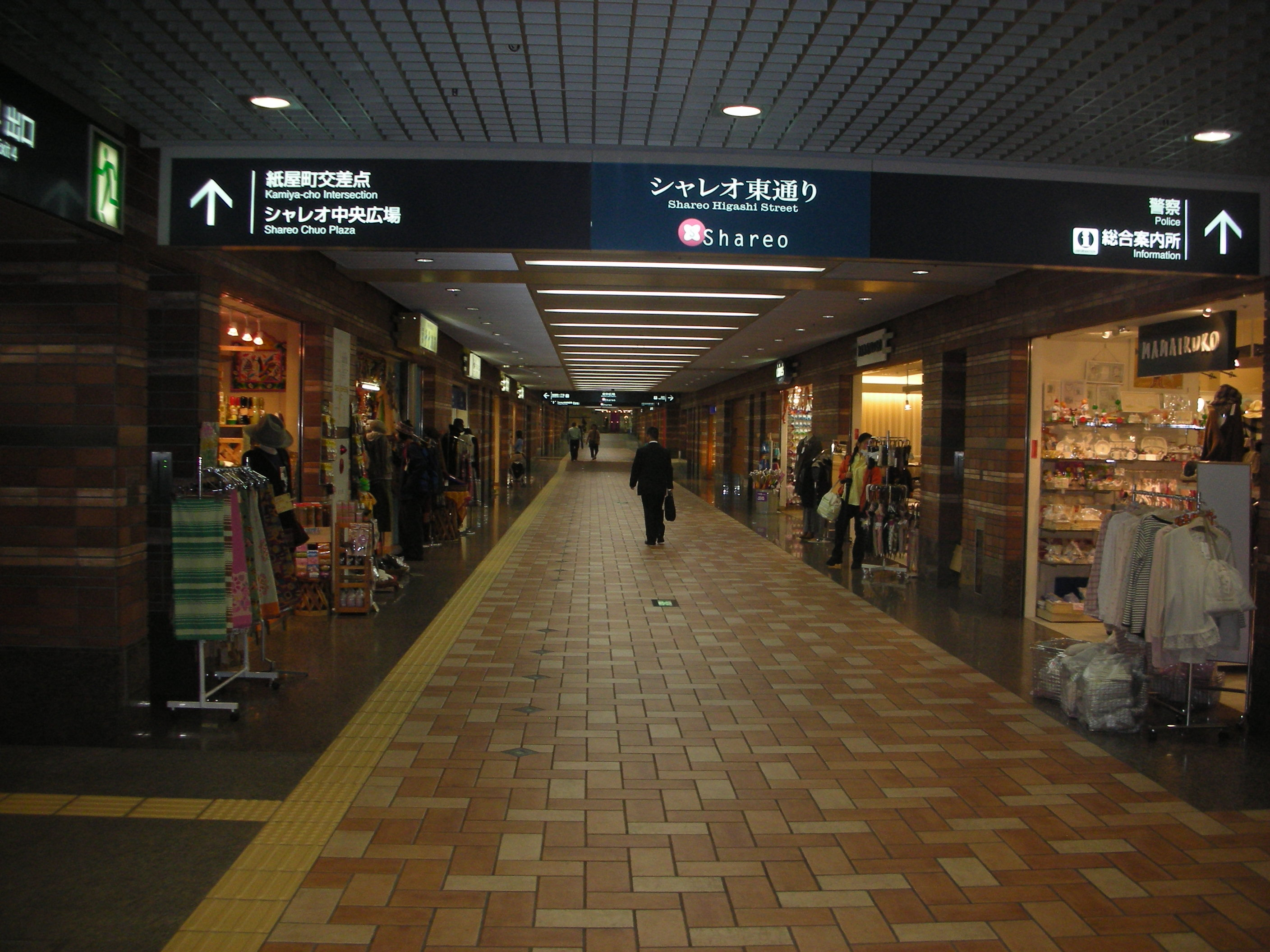
Kamiyachō Shareo, October 2008

Kamiyachō Shareo (紙屋町シャレオ) is an underground city located in central Hiroshima. It is the key underground network connecting public transport services around the Kamiyachō area. It contains two stations of the Astram Line and three stations of the Hiroden Main Line and the Ujina Line. This underground network is the only way to connect to those five stations. At the center of Kamiyachō Shareo, there is a transportation and tourist information center.

== Location ==
Kamiyachō Shareo is located underground around the Kamiyachō intersection between Rijō-dōri (avenue) and Aioi-dōri (street). Astram Line's train runs under Kamiyachō Shareo, around Rijō-dōri and across Aioi-dōri. The Hiroden Main Line and Ujina Line's streetcar run at street level on Aioi-dōri and Rijō-dōri.

== History ==
Kamiyachō Shareo was opened in 2001 as a public underground network with a shopping area by the Hiroshima City and the Hiroshima Prefecture governments. The area is operated by Hiroshima Chikagaikaihatsu which was established by city, prefecture, financial institutions and private enterprises. On the corner of the Kamiyachō intersection, there was a traffic control tower. And around the intersection, there were pedestrian crossings on the streets.

== Main areas ==
- "Shareo Central Place"—under the intersection of Rijō-dōri (street) and Aioi-dōri
  - "Shareo i Center"—Information center at Shareo Central Place
    - Information about transportation, tourism, weather, shopping and events around Hiroshima.
    - Open hours: 11:00–21:00
    - Information display operating hours: 7:00–22:30
- "Shareo North Street"—under Rijo-street
  - "Entrance of Astram Kencho-mae Station"
  - "Exit to Hiroshima Prefectural Offices"
  - "Exit to Hiroshima Bus Center, Sogo and AQ'A Hiroshima Center City"
  - "Exit to Motomachi Cred
  - "Exit to bus stops"
  - "Connecting to the underground passage to Hiroshima Green Arena, Hiroshima Chuo Park, Hiroshima Castle and Hiroshima Municipal Hospital"
  - "Cafe and Shops"
- "Shareo South Street"—under Rijo-street
  - "Entrance of Astram Hondori Station"
  - "Entrance of Hiroden Hondori Station"
  - "Exit to bus stops"
  - "Exit to Hondori"
  - "Cafe and Shops"
- "Shareo East Street"—under Aioi-street
  - "Entrance of Hiroden Kamiya-cho-higashi Station"
  - "Exit to bus stops"
  - "Cafe, Restaurants and Shops"
- "Shareo West Street"—under Aioi-street
  - "Entrance of Hiroden Kamiya-cho-nishi Station"
  - "Exit to Hiroshima Peace Memorial"
  - "Exit to Hiroshima Municipal Stadium"
  - "Exit to bus stops"
  - "Cafe, Restaurants and Shops"

== Facilities ==
- Information center
- Entrance of two Astram Line's stations
- Entrance of three Hiroden Main Line and Ujina Line's stations
- Shops
- Restaurants and cafes
- Police office
- Parking
- ATMs
- Coin-operated locker system

== Access ==
- Astram Line at Kencho-mae Station and Hondori Station
- Hiroden Main Line at Kamiya-cho-higashi and Kamiya-cho-nishi
- Hiroden Ujina Line at Hondori
- Hiroshima Bus Center

== Operator company ==
Hiroshima Chikagaikaihatsu CO., LTD. 広島地下街開発株式会社
- Type: Public
- Industry: Urban planning, Facility management
- Founded: December 17, 1990
- Headquarters: Motomachi-chikagai, Naka-ku, Hiroshima
- Website: www.shareo.net

Hiroshima Chikagaikaihatsu Co., Ltd. (広島地下街開発株式会社, Hiroshima Chikagaikaihatsu Kabushiki-gaisha) is a Japanese urban planning and facility management company based in Hiroshima, Japan. The company operates Kamiyachō Shareo.

=== History ===
- Founded on December 17, 1990.
- Renewed as Voluntary sector on May 1, 1992
- Opened Kamiyachō Shareo on April 11, 2001

== See also ==
- Hiroshima Green Arena
- Hiroshima Castle
- Motomachi Cred
- Hiroshima Bus Center
- Sogo
- Hiroshima Peace Memorial
- Hiroshima Municipal Stadium
- Hiroshima Chikagaikaihatsu
