= Kenchō-mae Station (Hiroshima) =

Railway station in Hiroshima city, Japan

Kenchō-mae 県庁前駅
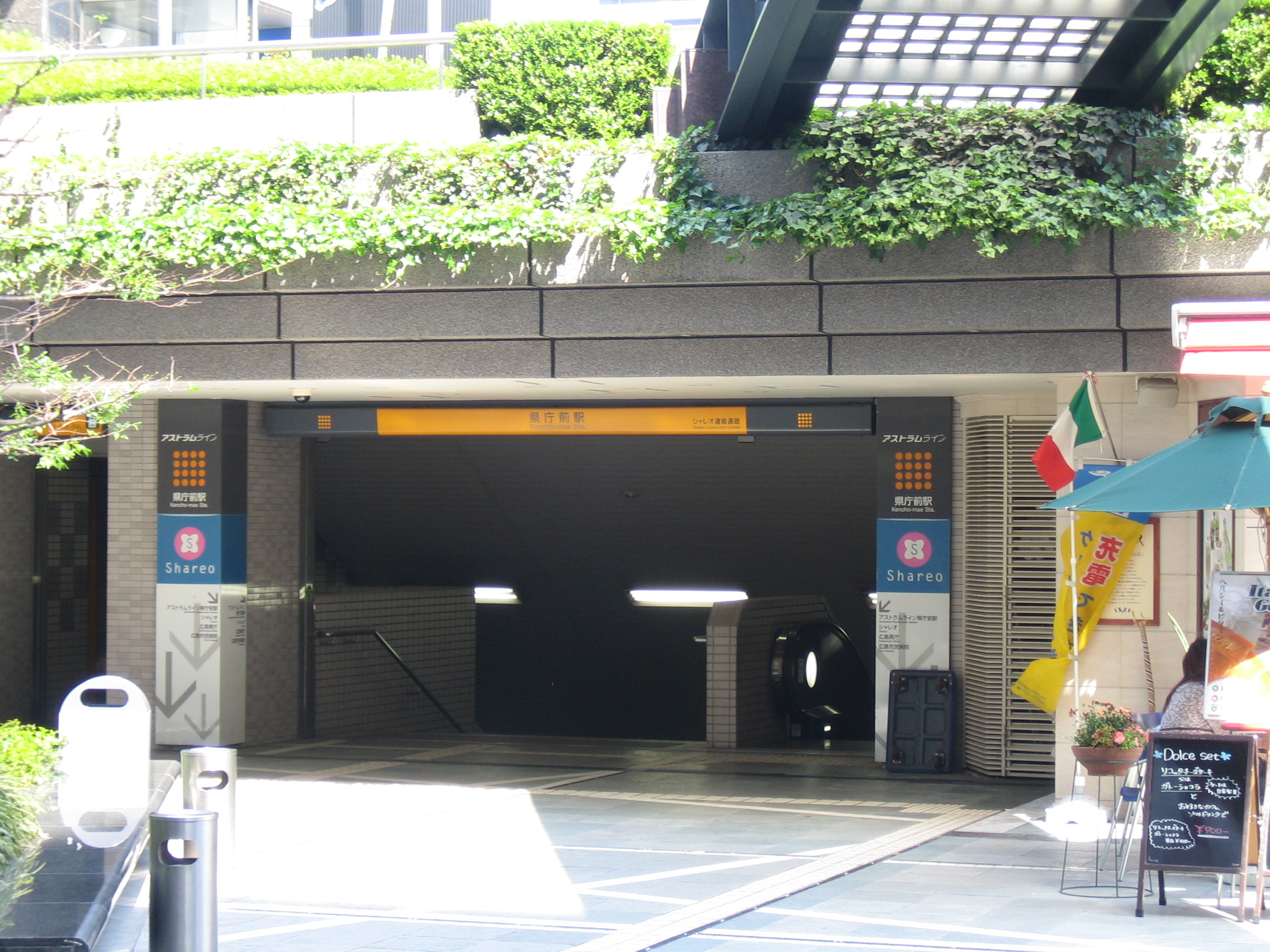

General information
- Location: 10-90, Motomachi, Naka-ku, Hiroshima; Japan
- Coordinates: 34°23′49″N 132°27′30″E
- Line: Astram Line
- Platforms: 1 island platform
- Tracks: 2
- Connections: Main Line and Ujina Line at Kamiya-cho-higashi Station and Kamiya-cho-nishi Station; Bus Routes at Hiroshima Bus Center

Construction
- Structure type: Underground

History
- Opened: 20 August 1994; 31 years ago

Services
Preceding station	Hiroshima Rapid Transit	Following station
Hondōri Terminus	Astram Line	Jōhoku towards Kōiki-kōen-mae
Location
- Location within Hiroshima Prefecture Location within Japan

Kenchō-mae Station is an HRT station on the Astram Line, located in 10–90, Motomachi, Naka-ku, Hiroshima.

== Platforms ==
1	█	for Kōiki-kōen-mae
2	█	for Hondōri

== Connections ==
█ Astram Line
●Hondōri Station — ●Kenchō-mae — ●Jōhoku

== Other services connections ==
█ Hiroden Main Line / █ Hiroden Ujina Line

- Hiroden Main Line Connections at Hiroden Kamiya-cho-nishi Station
- Hiroden Main Line Connections at Hiroden Kamiya-cho-higashi Station

█ Bus Service Routes

- Bus Service Route Connections at Hiroshima Bus Center

== Around station ==
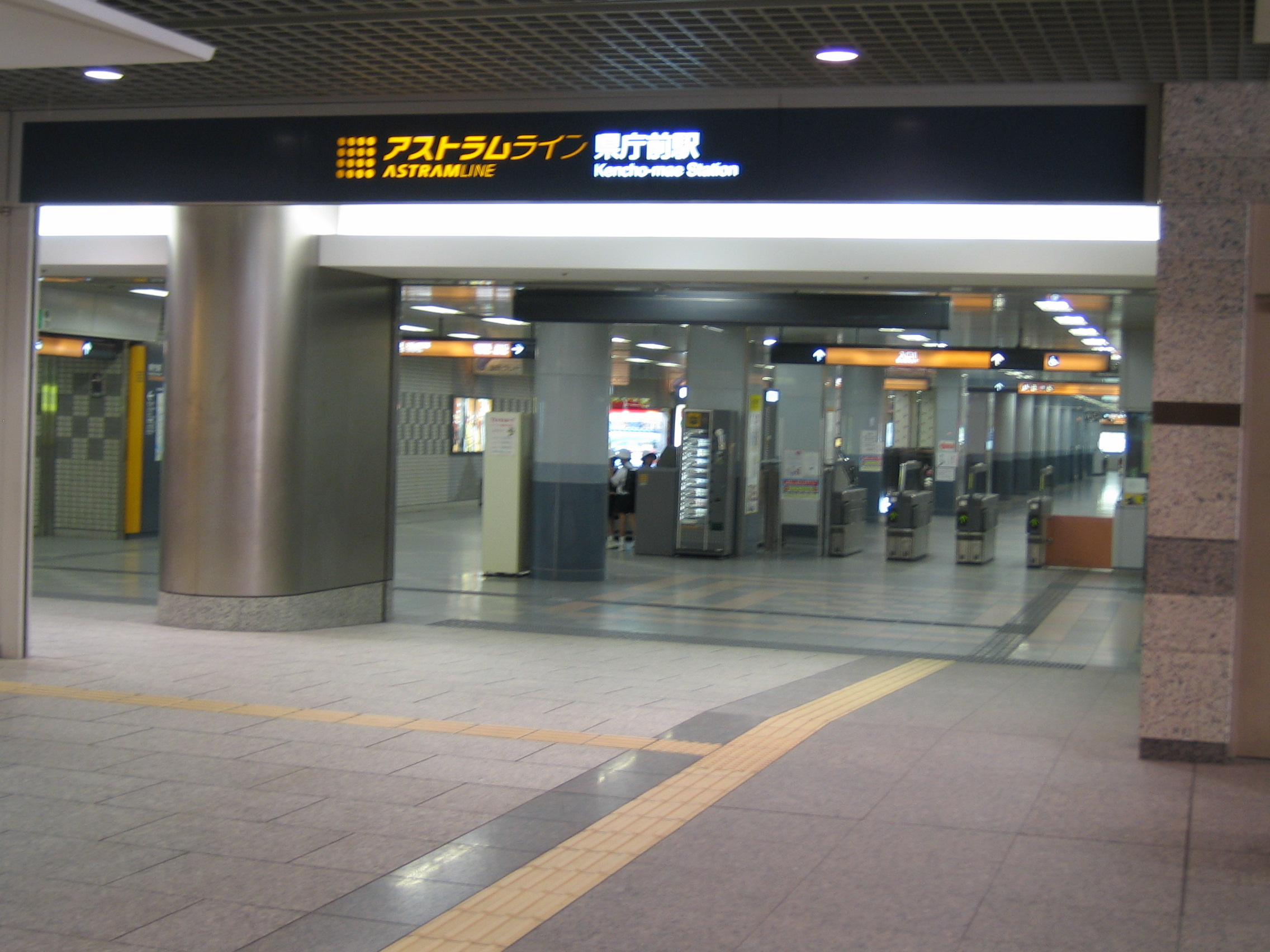
Ticket gate

=== Underground ===
- Kamiyachō Shareo

=== North ===
- Hiroshima Museum of Art
- Hiroshima Green Arena
- Hiroshima Castle
- Hiroshima Gokoku Shrine
- Hiroshima Central Park (Chūō Kōen)

=== South ===
- Hiroshima Hondōri Shōtengai

=== East ===
- Hiroshima Prefectural Government Offices (Kenchō)
- Hiroshima City Hospital

=== West ===
- Hiroshima Bus Center
- Motomachi Cred
- Sogo
- Hiroshima Municipal Stadium
- Hiroshima Peace Memorial

== History ==
- Opened on August 20, 1994.

== See also ==
- Astram Line
- Hiroshima Rapid Transit
