= Kamiya-cho-nishi Station =

Tram stop in Hiroshima, Japan

Coordinates: 34°23′43″N 132°27′25″E

Kamiya-chō-nishi 紙屋町西
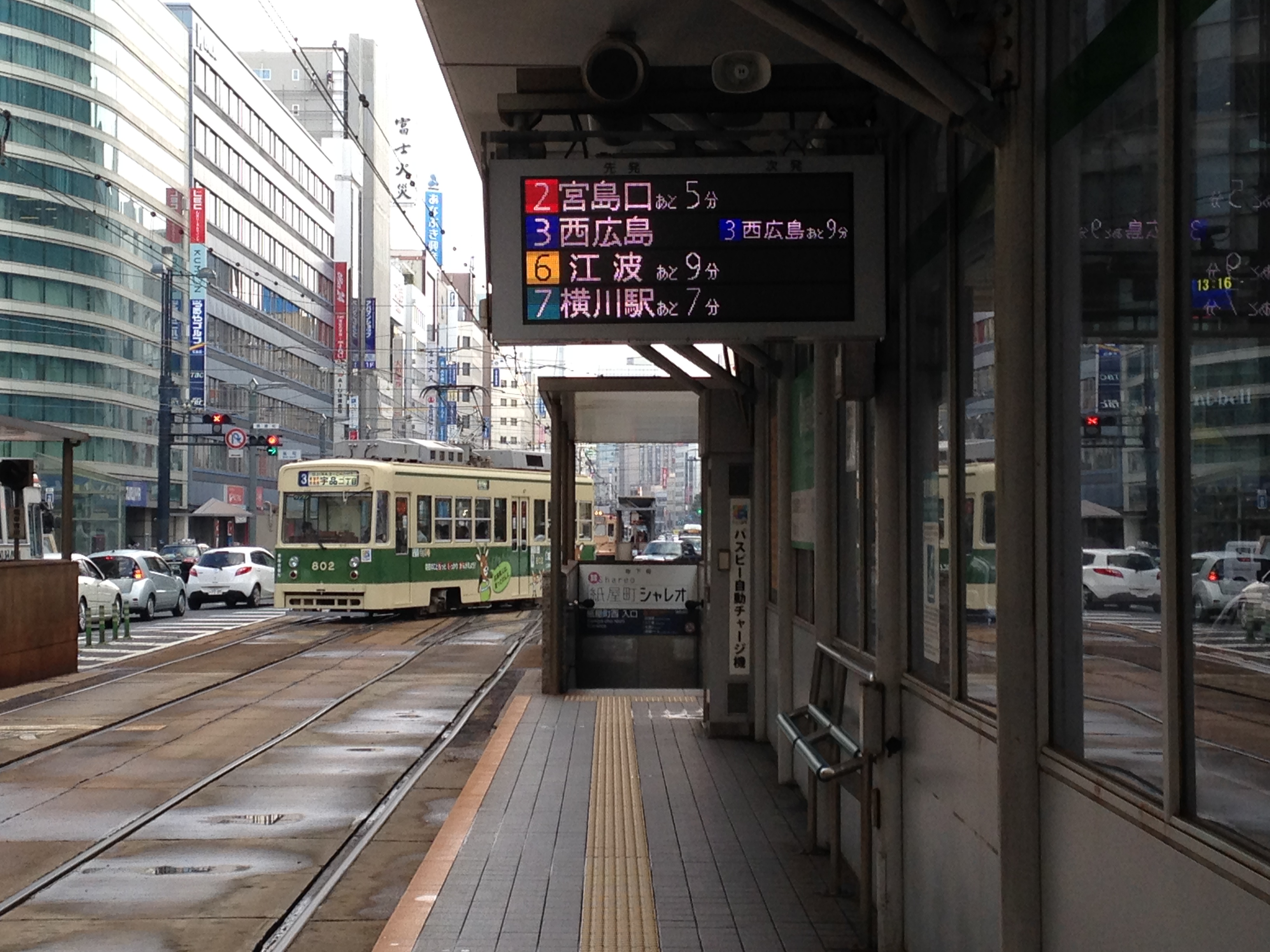
- Kamiya-cho-nishi Station Platform

General information
- Location: Kamiya-chō 2-chōme, Naka-ku, Hiroshima; Japan
- Operator: Hiroshima Electric Railway
- Lines: █ Hiroden Main Line █ Hiroden Ujina Line; Route
- Connections: █ Astram Line at Hondori Station and Kenchō-mae Station; Bus Routes at Hiroshima Bus Center

Other information
- Station code: M08

History
- Opened: December 23, 1912
Location

Kamiya-chō-nishi is a Hiroden station (tram stop) on Hiroden Main Line and Hiroden Ujina Line, located in Kamiya-chō 2-chōme, Naka-ku, Hiroshima. To reach the station, take an underground pass through Kamiya-chō Shareo.

== Routes ==
From Kamiya-chō-nishi Station, there are four of Hiroden Streetcar routes.

- Hiroshima Station - Hiroden-miyajima-guchi Route
- Hiroden-nishi-hiroshima - Hiroshima Port Route
- Hiroshima Station - Eba Route
- Yokogawa Station - Hiroden-honsha-mae Route

== Connections ==
█ Main Line

Kamiya-chō-higashi — Kamiya-chō-nishi — Genbaku Dome-mae (Atomic Bomb Dome)

█ Main Line / █ Ujina Line

Genbaku Dome-mae (Atomic Bomb Dome) — Kamiya-chō-nishi — Hondori

== Other services connections ==
█ Astram Line

- Astram Line Connections at Astram Hondori Station
- Astram Line Connections at Astram Kenchō-mae Station

█ Bus Service Routes

- Bus Service Route Connections at Hiroshima Bus Center

== Around station ==
=== Underground ===
- Kamiya-chō Shareo

=== North ===
- Hiroshima Bus Center
- Sogo
- ALSOK Hall
- Hiroshima Municipal Stadium
- Hiroshima Museum of Art

=== South ===
- DEODEO head store
- Hiroshima Peace Memorial Park
  - Hiroshima Peace Memorial
  - Children's Peace Monument
- Hiroshima Kenmin Bunka Center
  - Rijyo Kaikan Hotel

== History ==
- Opened as "Kamiya-chō" on November 23, 1912.
- Rebuilt and renamed as "Kamiya-chō-nishi" on November 1, 2001.

== See also ==
- Hiroden lines and routes
- List of railway stations in Japan
