= AQ'A Hiroshima Center City =

Coordinates: 34°23′46″N 132°27′26″E

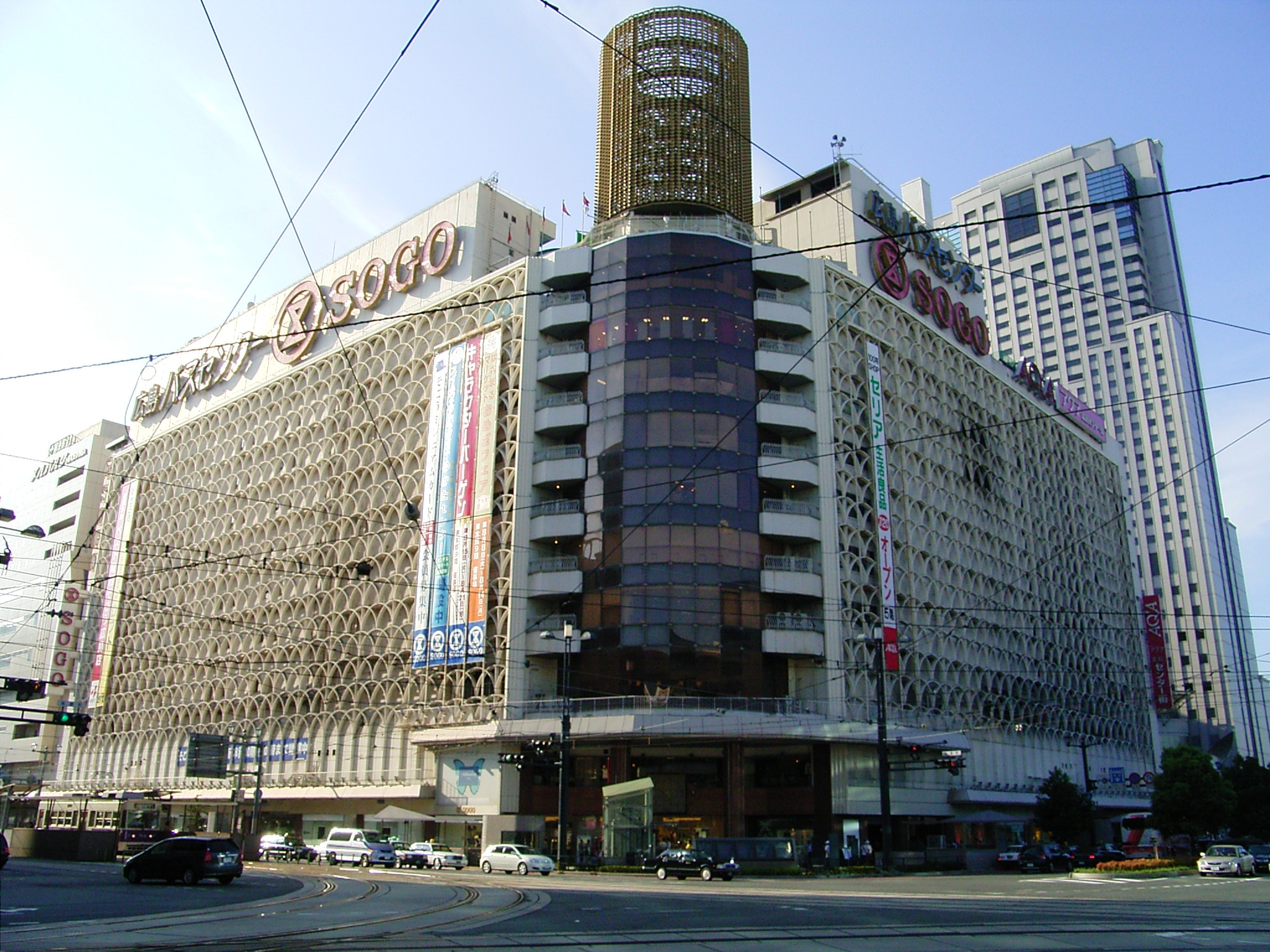
- Hiroshima Bus Center, Hiroshima SOGO and AQ'A Hiroshima Center City
- Location: Hiroshima
- Owner: Hiroshima Rail Center

AQ'A Hiroshima Center City is a shopping center located in central Hiroshima operated by the Hiroshima Bus Center.

== History ==
- History of AQ'A Hiroshima Center City

== Floors ==
- 9F - Clinic & Culture
- 8F - Clinic & Service
- 7F - Gourmet town - Cafes, Restaurants and discount store
- 6F - Books Kinokuniya - books, stationeries and DVDs
- 5F - Life style support
- 4F - Lady's total fashion
- 3F - Hiroshima Bus Center
- 2F - Lady's fashion
- 1F - Lady's fashion
- 1B - Parking

== Access ==
- Hiroshima Bus Center
- Astram Line
- Hiroden Main Line and UjinaLine

== See also ==
- Hiroshima Bus Center
- Sogo
- Motomachi Cred
- Kamiya-cho Shareo
