= Hondōri Station (Astram Line) =

Railway station in Hiroshima city, Japan

Hondōri 本通駅
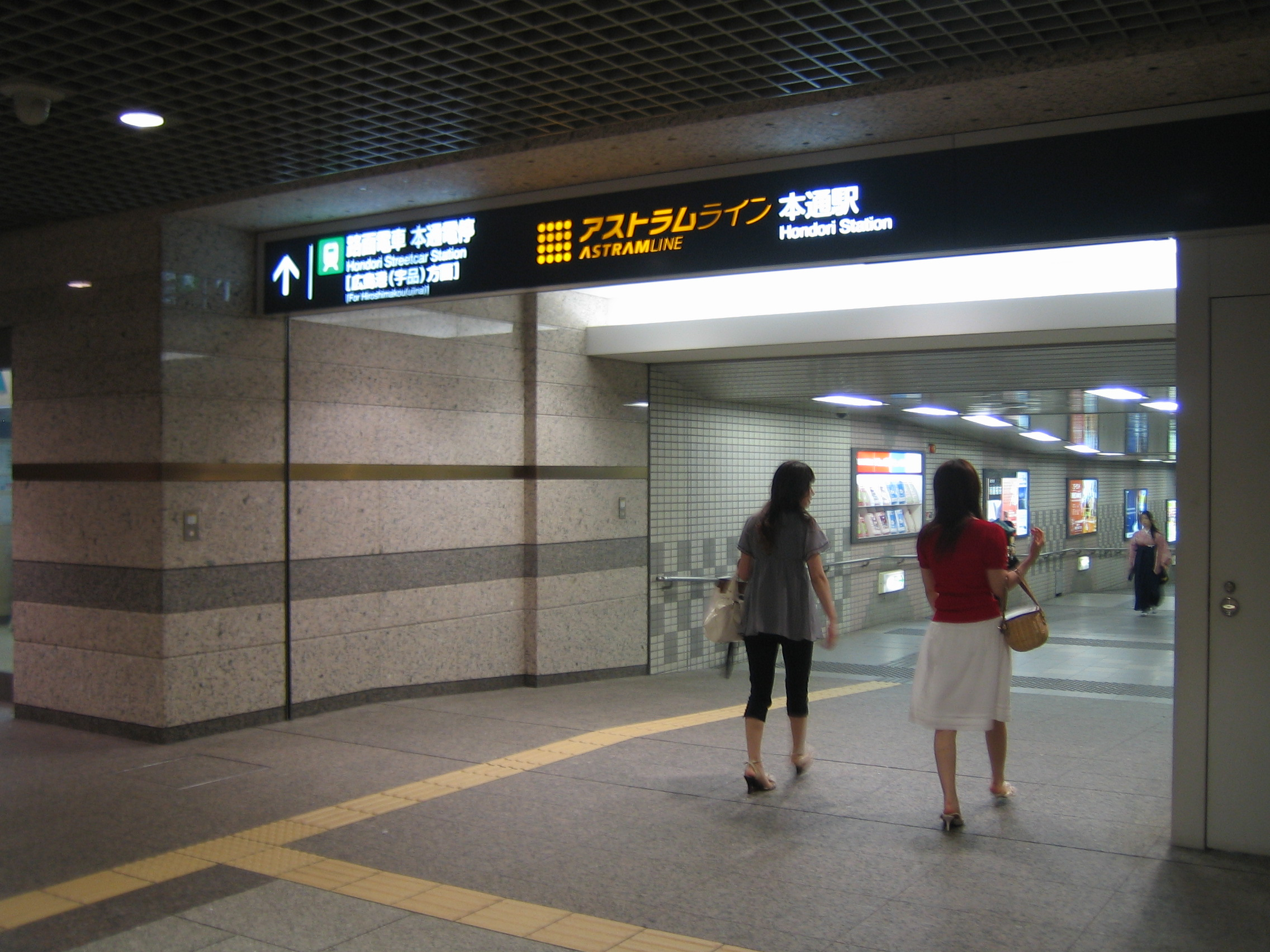

General information
- Location: 6-30, Hondōri, Naka-ku, Hiroshima; Japan
- Coordinates: 34°23′36″N 132°27′25″E
- Line: Astram Line
- Platforms: 1 island platform
- Tracks: 2
- Connections: Hiroden Ujina Line at Hondori; Hiroden Main Line at Kamiya-cho-higashi and Kamiya-cho-nishi; Bus Routes at Hiroshima Bus Center

Construction
- Structure type: Underground

History
- Opened: 20 August 1994; 31 years ago

Services
Preceding station	Hiroshima Rapid Transit	Following station
Terminus	Astram Line	Kenchō-mae towards Kōiki-kōen-mae
Location
- Location within Hiroshima Prefecture Location within Japan

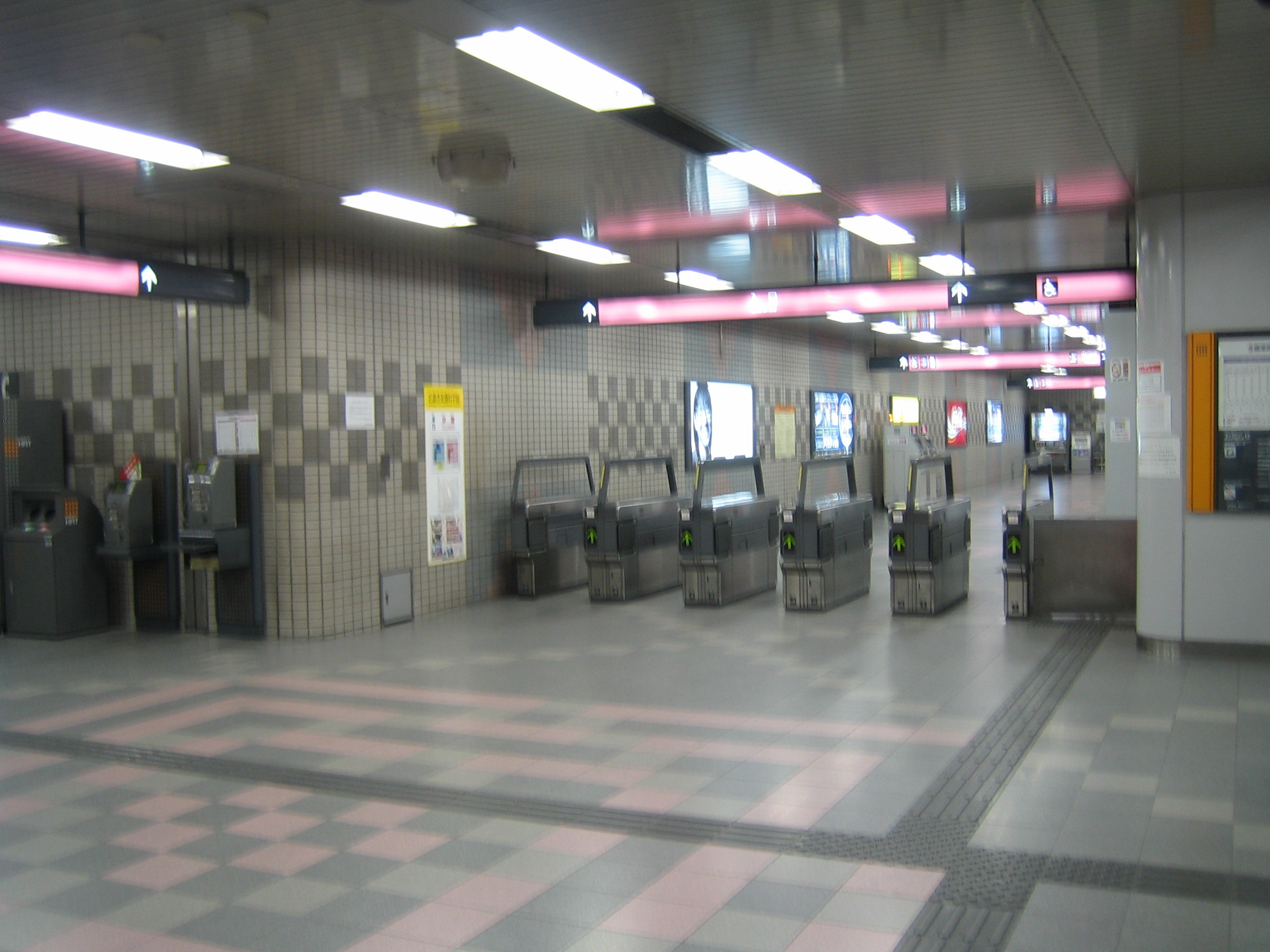
Ticket gate

Hondōri Station (本通駅, Hondōri-eki) is an HRT terminal station on the Astram Line, located in Hondōri, Naka-ku, Hiroshima. This is the lowest station in the Astram Line (11.4m below sea level).

== Platforms ==
1・2	█	for Kōiki-kōen-mae

== Connections ==
█ Astram Line
●Hondōri Station — ●Kenchō-mae Station

== Other services connections ==
█ Hiroden Ujina Line

- Hiroden Ujina Line Connections at Hiroden Hondōri Station

█ Hiroden Main Line / █ Hiroden Ujina Line

- Hiroden Main Line Connections at Hiroden Kamiya-chō-nishi Station
- Hiroden Main Line Connections at Hiroden Kamiya-chō-higashi Station

█ Bus Service Routes

- Bus Service Route Connections at Hiroshima Bus Center

== Around station ==
=== Underground ===
- Kamiyachō Shareo

=== North ===
- Hiroshima Bus Center

=== South ===
- Hondōri Station (Hiroden)

=== East ===
- Hiroshima Hondōri Shōtengai (shopping street)

=== West ===
- Hiroshima Peace Memorial Park
  - Hiroshima Peace Memorial
- Aqua Net Hiroshima (Sightseeing boats)

== History ==
- Opened on August 20, 1994.

== See also ==
- Astram Line
- Hiroshima Rapid Transit
