= Jōhoku Station =

Railway station in Hiroshima, Japan

Jōhoku 城北駅
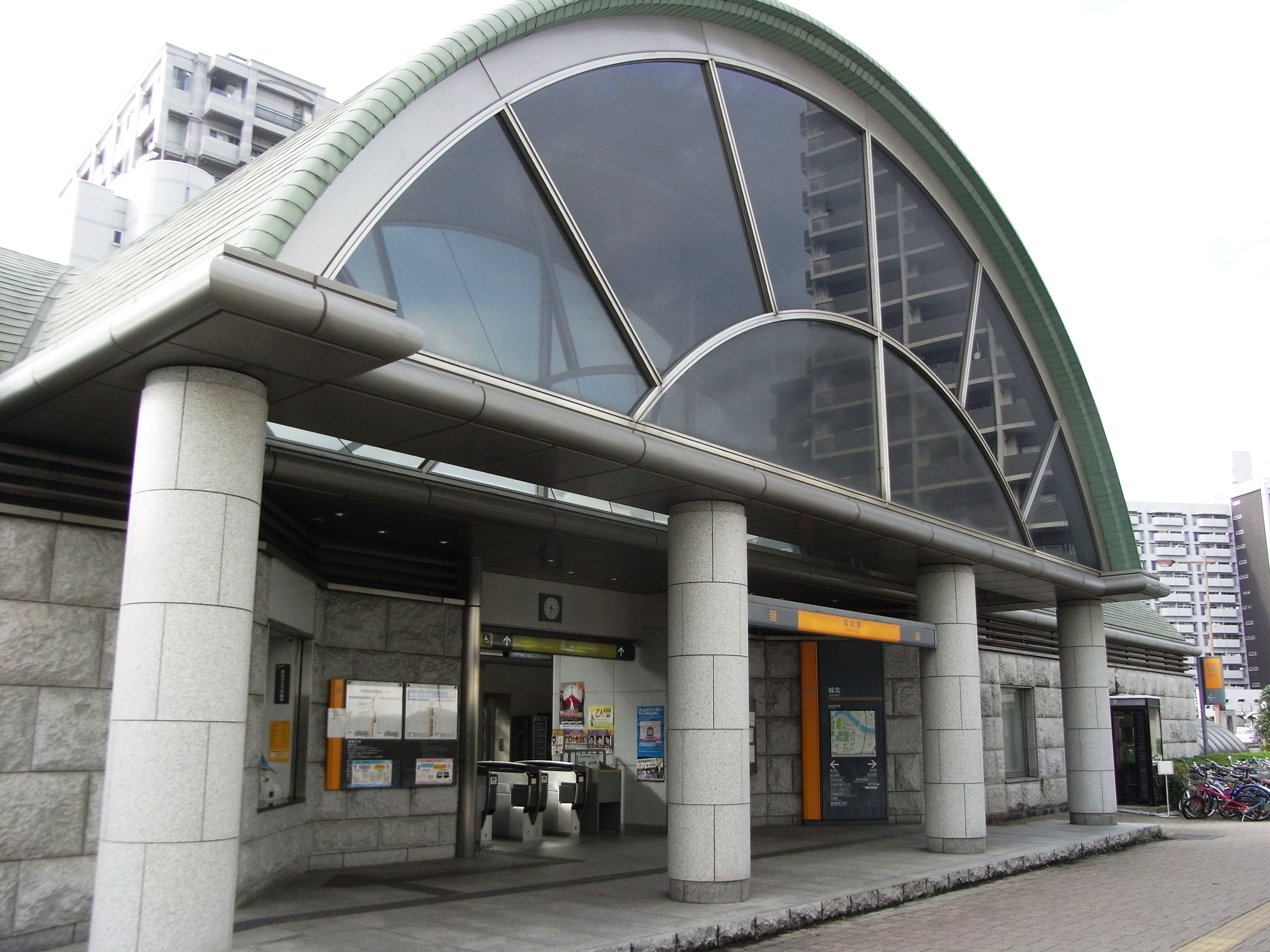
- Jōhoku Station

General information
- Location: 25-80, Nishi-hakushima, Naka-ku, Hiroshima; Japan
- Coordinates: 34°24′19″N 132°27′32″E
- Line: Astram Line
- Platforms: 1 island platform

Construction
- Structure type: Underground station

History
- Opened: August 20, 1994; 31 years ago

Services
Preceding station	Hiroshima Rapid Transit	Following station
Kenchō-mae towards Hondōri	Astram Line	Shin-Hakushima towards Kōiki-kōen-mae
Location
- Location within Hiroshima Prefecture Location within Japan

Jōhoku Station is a HRT station on Astram Line, located in 25–80, Nishi-hakushima, Naka-ku, Hiroshima.

== Platforms ==
1	█	for Kōiki-kōen-mae
2	█	for Hondōri

== Connections ==
█ Astram Line
●Kenchō-mae — ●Jōhoku — Shin-Hakushima

== Around station ==
- Hiroshima Castle
- Hiroshima Municipal Hiroshima Motomachi High School
- Hiroshima Central Park (Chūō Koen)

== History ==
- Opened on August 20, 1994.

== See also ==
- Astram Line
- Hiroshima Rapid Transit
