= Kamiyachō Station (Hiroshima) =

Tram station in Hiroshima, Japan

Coordinates: 34°23′42.94″N 132°27′27.35″E

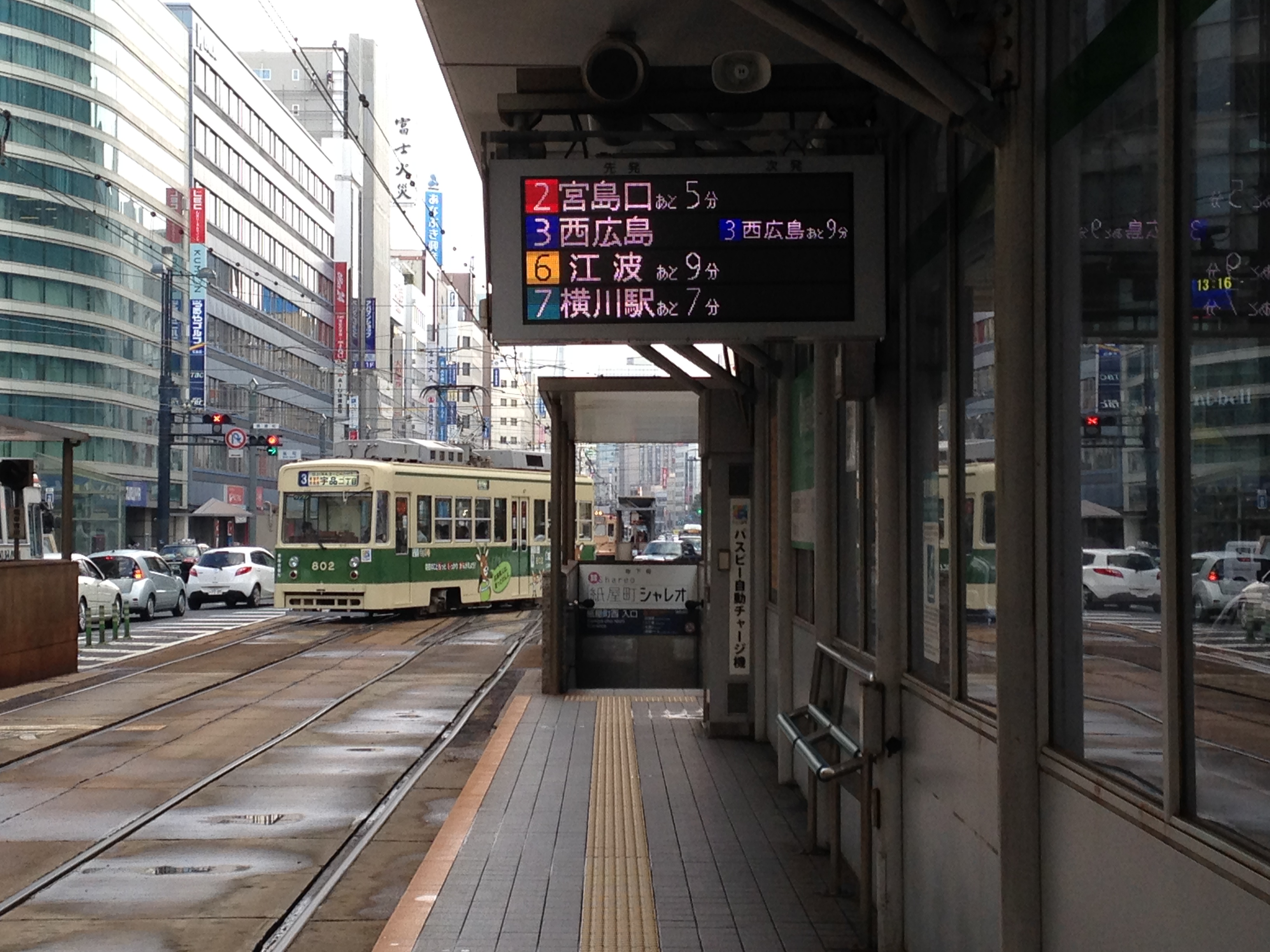
Kamiyachonishi Station Platform

Kamiyachō (紙屋町) is a tram stop of Hiroshima Electric Railway located in Naka-ku, Hiroshima, Japan. The stop is on the Main Line and is the terminal of the Ujina Line.

It has two sets of platforms called Kamiya-cho-higashi and Kamiya-cho-nishi, each of which is commonly treated as an independent tram stop. Prior to the revision on November 1, 2001, both stops were called Kamiyachō without distinction.
