= Hiroshima Prefectural Sports Center =

Indoor arena located in Hiroshima, Japan

Coordinates: 34°23′58″N 132°27′19″E

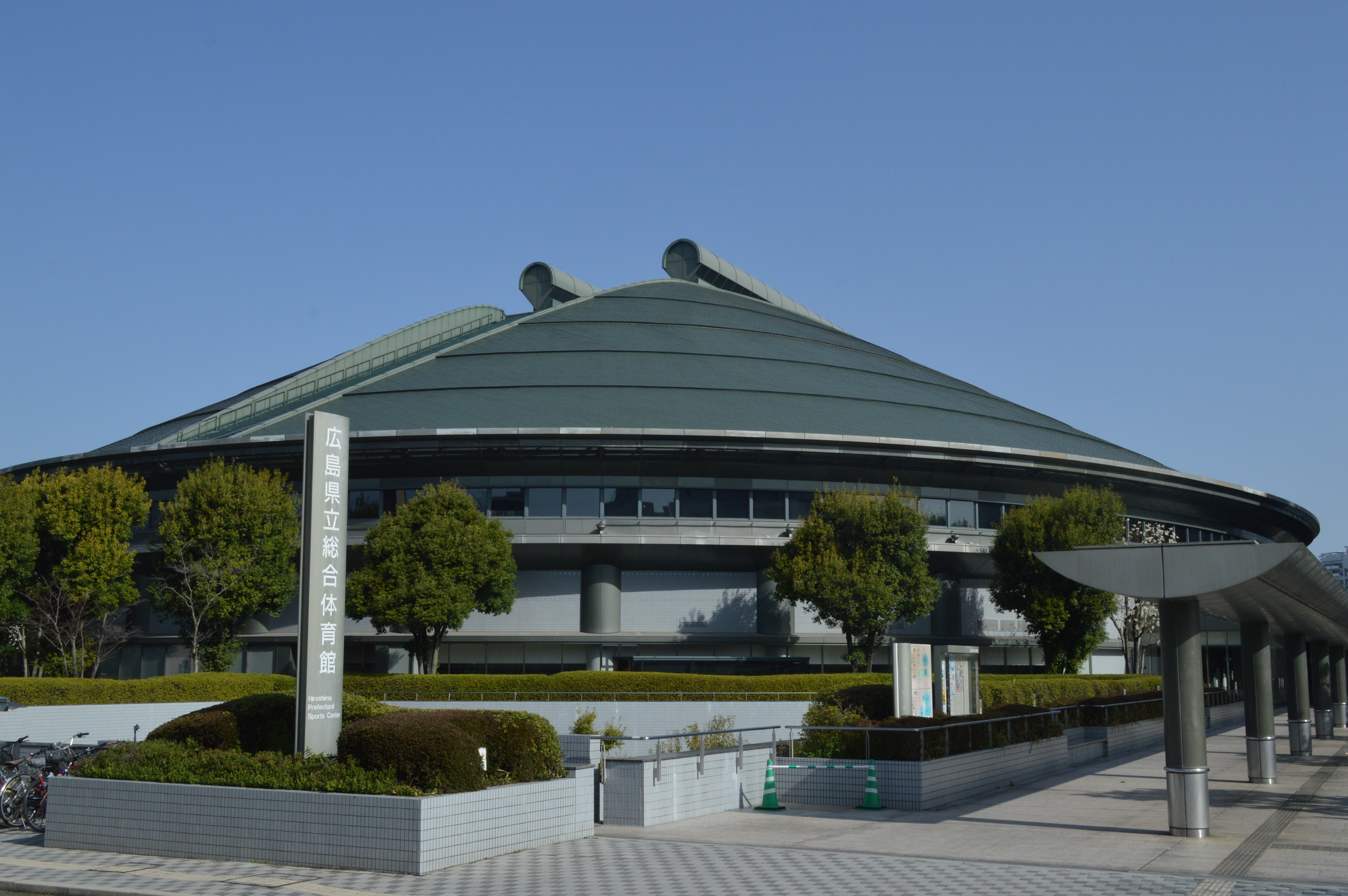
- The Main Arena, 2021
- Interactive map of Hiroshima Prefectural Sports Center
- Location: 4-1 Motomachi, Naka-ku, Hiroshima
- Owner: Hiroshima Prefecture
- Operator: Hiroshima Prefecture
- Capacity: 4,750 (max. 10,000) for Main Arena; 500 for Sub Arena

Construction
- Opened: 1994 (rebuilt)

Tenant
- JT Thunders

Website
- www.sports.pref.hiroshima.jp

Hiroshima Prefectural Sports Center (広島県立総合体育館, Hiroshima Kenritsu Sōgō Taiikukan) is an indoor arena located in Hiroshima, Japan. The original arena was built sometime shortly after World War II. The arena was rebuilt for the 1994 Asian Games. It hosted some of the group games for the 2006 FIVB Men's World Championship and the official 2006 Basketball World Championship.

== Facilities ==
- Main Arena ("Hiroshima Green Arena" (広島グリーンアリーナ))
- Sub Arena
- Budō arena - for judo and kendo
- Kyūdō arena
- Fitness plaza
  - Training room
  - Swimming pool
- Studio
- Health Support Center
- Conference rooms
- Sports Information Center
  - Mizuno pro shop
- Restaurant
- Shop

== Access ==
- Hiroshima Bus Center
- Astram Line
- Hiroden Main Line and Ujina Line
