= Aqua Net Hiroshima =

Japanese company

AQUA NET HIROSHIMA; 株式会社アクアネット広島
- Type: Public company
- Industry: Transportation, tourism
- Founded: June 2004
- Headquarters: 8-15-103 Onaga-nishi 1-chome, Higashi-ku, Hiroshima, Hiroshima, Japan
- Website: www.aqua-net-h.co.jp/

Aqua Net Hiroshima (株式会社アクアネット広島, Kabushiki-gaisha Akuanetto Hiroshima) is a Japanese transportation/tourism company based in Hiroshima, Japan.

== Overview ==
From 1989 the third sector company "Hiroshima River Cruise" operated a river sightseeing boat, but ceased operations in February 2002 and dissolved in March. In June of the same year, "Aqua Net Hiroshima" was established, and took over the river sightseeing boat business starting in July (the business was later transferred to River Sea Cruise Co., Ltd., established in 2016).

In 2003 the company began operating the "World Heritage Route" as an irregular service connecting the Motoyasu Pier at the eastern end of Motoyasu Bridge with Miyajima Port No. 3 Pier on Itsukushima in Hatsukaichi City, and began operating it as a regular scheduled service from 2005.

From July 2010 the company operated a regular service between Miyajima Port No. 3 Pier and "Miyajimaguchi West Pier," which is located west of "Miyajimaguchi Pier," the mainland terminal where the existing JR West Miyajima Ferry and Miyajima Matsudai Kisen depart and arrive. However, due to low passenger numbers, this service was suspended on 15 August 2011. Operations resumed in November with service limited to Saturdays, Sundays, and public holidays.

In March 2014 the service was renamed the "Miyajima-bound Great Torii Sightseeing Route" and regular daily operations resumed. The service runs daily. Along with this change, the name of the pier was changed from "Miyajimaguchi West Pier" to "Ono Pier."

== Sightseeing boats ==
- Miyajima the 3rd pier – off Itsukushima Shrine – the 3rd pier
- Hiroshima Peace Memorial Park – Miyajima
- River cruise
