= Hiroden Main Line =

Tram line in Hiroshima, Japan

The Main Line (本線, Honsen) is a streetcar line of Hiroshima Electric Railway (Hiroden) in Hiroshima, Japan. The line has been operated since 1912.

The total distance of the line is 5.5 kilometres (3.4 mi). Routes 1, 2, 3, 5, 6, 7 and 8 operate on the line. The line has 18 stations, numbered M1 through M18.

== Stations ==
No.	Station	Routes	Connections
M01	Hiroshima Station		JR lines at JR Hiroshima Station █ JR Sanyo Shinkansen █ JR Sanyo Main Line █ JR Kure Line █ JR Kabe Line █ JR Geibi Line
M02	Inari-machi	L	█ Hiroden Hijiyama Line
M03	Kanayama-cho	L	
M04	Ebisu-cho	L	
M05	Hatchobori	L	█ Hiroden Hakushima Line
M06	Tate-machi	L	
M07	Kamiya-cho-higashi	L	█ Hiroden Ujina Line █ Astram Line (at Kencho-mae or Hondori Station) ★ (Hiroshima Bus Center)
M08	Kamiya-cho-nishi		█ Hiroden Ujina Line █ Astram Line (at Kencho-mae or Hondori Station) ★ (Hiroshima Bus Center)
M09	Genbaku Dome-mae (Atomic Bomb Dome)		★ (Hiroshima Peace Memorial) ★ (Hiroshima Peace Memorial Park) ★ (Sightseeing boats)
M10	Honkawa-cho		
M11	Tokaichi-machi		█ Hiroden Yokogawa Line
M12	Dobashi		█ Hiroden Eba Line
M13	Koami-cho		
M14	Tenma-cho		
M15	Kanon-machi		
M16	Nishi-kanon-machi		
M17	Fukushima-cho		
M18	Hiroden-nishi-hiroshima		█ Hiroden Miyajima Line █ JR Sanyo Main Line (at JR Nishi-Hiroshima Station)
