= Hiroden Ujina Line =

Tram line in Hiroshima, Japan

The Ujina Line (宇品線, Ujina-sen) is a streetcar line of Hiroshima Electric Railway (Hiroden) in Hiroshima, Japan. The line has been in operation since 1912. After the bombing of Hiroshima on August 6, 1945, the Ujina and Hiroden Honsha-mae lines were reopened after a month-long closure.

The total distance of the line is 5.7 kilometers. Routes 1, 3, 5 and 7 operate on the line. The line has 20 stations, numbered M07 and M08 (two stations at Kamiyachō) and U1 through U18.

== Stations ==
No.	Station	Routes	Connections
M07	Kamiya-cho-higashi	L	█ Hiroden Main Line █ Astram Line (at Kencho-mae or Hondori Station) ★ (Hiroshima Bus Center)
M08	Kamiya-cho-nishi		█ Hiroden Main Line █ Astram Line (at Kencho-mae or Hondori Station) ★ (Hiroshima Bus Center)
U01	Hondori	L	█ Astram Line (at Hondori Station)
U02	Fukuro-machi	L	
U03	Chuden-mae	L	
U04	Shiyakusho-mae	L	
U05	Takanobashi	L	
U06	Nisseki-byoin-mae	L	
U07	Hiroden-honsha-mae	L	
U08	Miyuki-bashi	L	
U09	Minami-machi 6-chome	L	█ Hiroden Hijiyama Line
U10	Hirodaifuzokugakkou-mae		
U11	Kenbyoin-mae		
U12	Ujina 2-chōme		
U13	Ujina 3-chōme		
U14	Ujina 4-chōme		
U15	Ujina 5-chōme		
U16	Kaigan-dori		
U17	Motoujina-guchi		
U18	Hiroshima Port		█ ferries and hydrofoils for Matsuyama, Imabari, Kure, Miyajima, Etajima and some other islands in Seto Inland Sea
