= Hiroshima Bus Center =

Bus terminal in Hiroshima, Japan

Coordinates: 34°23′47″N 132°27′24″E

Hiroshima Bus Center 広島バスセンタ
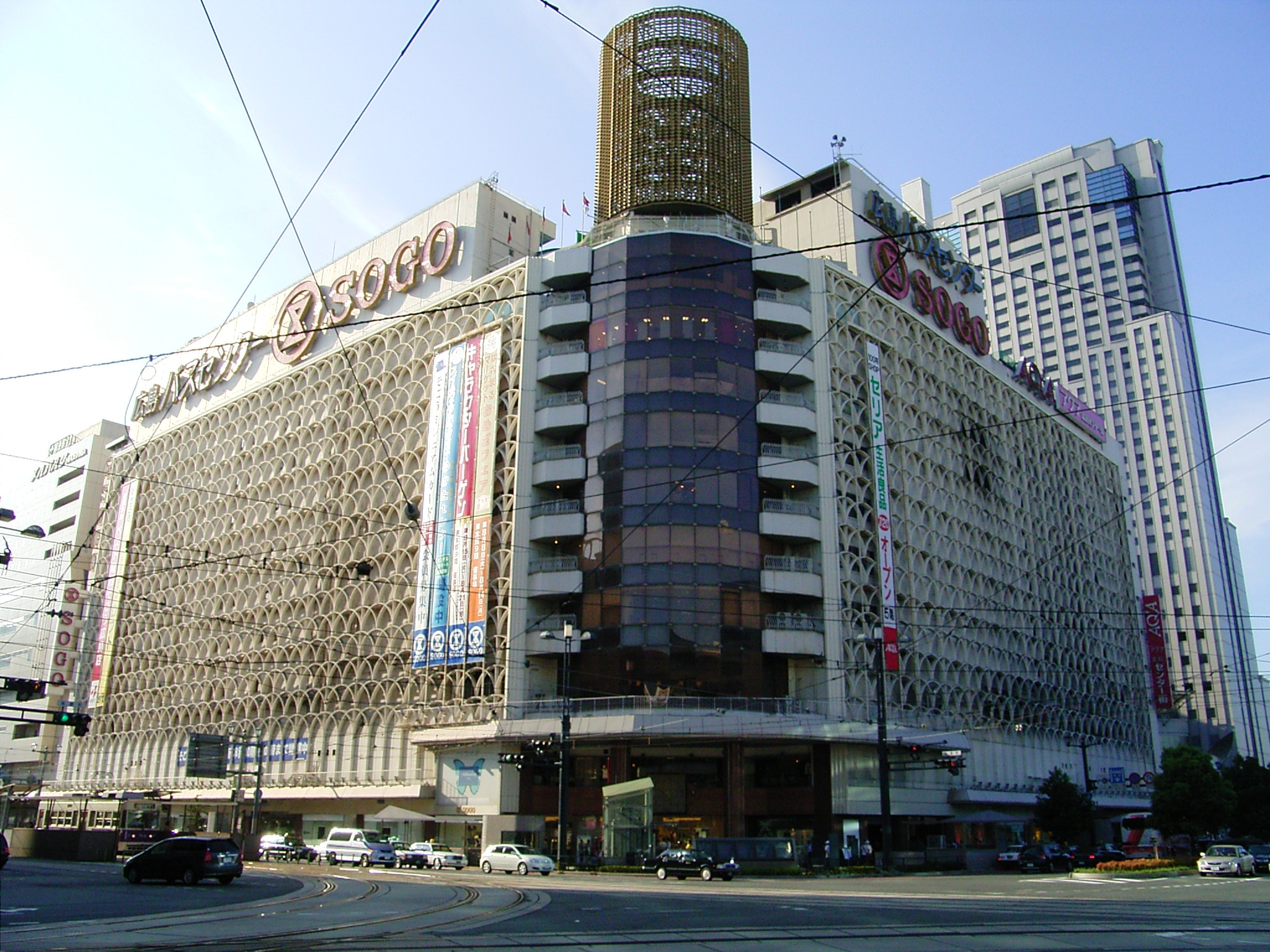
- Hiroshima Bus Center, Hiroshima SOGO and AQ'A Hiroshima Center City

General information
- Location: Hiroshima; Japan
- System: Bus terminal
- Operator: Hiroshima Bus Center Co., Ltd
- Bus stands: 20

History
- Opened: 29 July 1957
Location

Hiroshima Bus Center (広島バスセンター, Hiroshima Basusentā) is the key bus terminal located in central Hiroshima.

== History ==
Hiroshima Bus terminal opened on July 29, 1957, with bus stops around Kamiya-cho, Hiroshima. The current "Bus Center" opened in October 1974 as a part of "Hiroshima Center Buildings" together with Sogo and AQ'A Hiroshima Center City. "Hiroshima Bus Center" is on the 3rd floor. "Hiroshima Bus Center" and "AQ'A Hiroshima Center City" are operated by Hiroshima Bus Center Co., Ltd.

== Terminals ==
- 11 Departures
- 9 Arrivals

== Bus routes ==
=== Local bus ===
- Hiroden Bus
- Chugoku JR Bus
- Hiroshima Bus
- Geiyo Bus
- Hiroshima Kotsu

== Connections ==
- Astram Line
- Hiroden Main Line
- Hiroden Ujina Line

== See also ==
- AQ'A Hiroshima Center City
- Sogo
- Kamiya-cho Shareo
