= Hiroshima Peace Memorial =

Preserved ruins of the atomic bombing of Hiroshima, Japan

Hiroshima Peace Memorial (Genbaku Dome)
UNESCO World Heritage Site
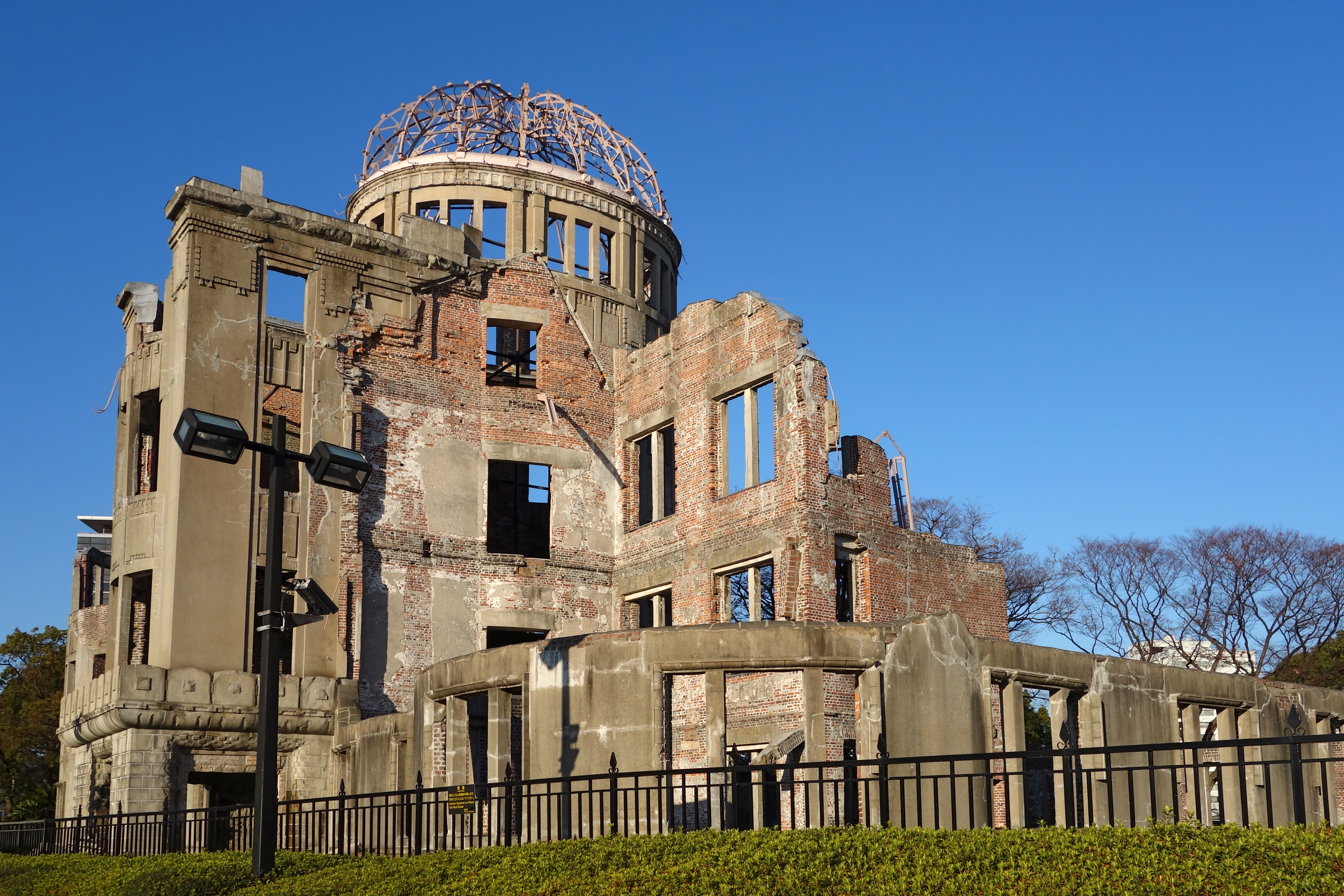
- Ruin of Hiroshima Prefectural Industrial Promotion Hall

- Location within Hiroshima Prefecture Location within Japan
- Location: Hiroshima, Japan
- Criteria: Cultural: vi
- Reference: 775
- Inscription: 1996 (20th Session)
- Coordinates: 34°23′44″N 132°27′13″E

The Hiroshima Peace Memorial (広島平和記念碑, Hiroshima Heiwa Kinenhi), originally the Hiroshima Prefectural Industrial Promotion Hall, and now commonly called the Genbaku Dome, Atomic Bomb Dome or A-Bomb Dome (原爆ドーム, Genbaku Dōmu), is part of Hiroshima Peace Memorial Park in Hiroshima, Japan, and was designated a UNESCO World Heritage Site in 1996.

The building is a prominent structure that remained standing in the area around the atomic bombing of Hiroshima on 6 August 1945, three days before the atomic bombing of Nagasaki and nine days before Japan surrendered, ending World War II. The ruin serves as a memorial to the over 140,000 people killed in the bombing. It is permanently kept in a state of preserved ruin as a reminder of the destructive effects of nuclear warfare.

== Original building ==
The Product Exhibition Hall building was originally designed by Czech architect Jan Letzel. The design included a distinctive dome at the top of the building. It was completed in April 1915 and was named the Hiroshima Prefectural Commercial Exhibition (HMI). It was formally opened to the public in August that year. The name was changed to the Hiroshima Prefectural Products Exhibition Hall in 1921 and to the Hiroshima Prefectural Industrial Promotion Hall (広島県産業奨励館 Hiroshima-ken Sangyo Shourei-kan) in 1933. The building was in the large business district next to the Aioi Bridge and was primarily used for art and educational exhibitions.

== Atomic bombing ==
During the Second World War, at 8:15 a.m. on 6 August 1945, the first atomic bomb ever used in war was dropped on Hiroshima. The bomb possessed a force equivalent to 15,000 tons of TNT, and effectively obliterated the city. Hiroshima was selected as a target because of its population size and density; relative lack of damage from conventional bombing; and because it had no known POW camp. Aioi Bridge was chosen as the aimpoint because it was easily recognizable and was located near the city center which had a high population density. The bomb missed its target by 240 m (790 ft) and exploded directly over Shima Hospital, which was very near to the Genbaku Dome. The center of the blast occurred 150 m (490 ft) horizontally and 600 m (2,000 ft) vertically from the Dome. Everyone inside was instantly killed. Because the explosion was almost directly overhead, the building kept its shape. Its vertical columns resisted the blast's nearly vertical downward force, and parts of the concrete and brick outer walls remained intact. The building's durability can also be attributed to its earthquake-resistant design; it has survived earthquakes before and since the bombing.

== Preservation ==
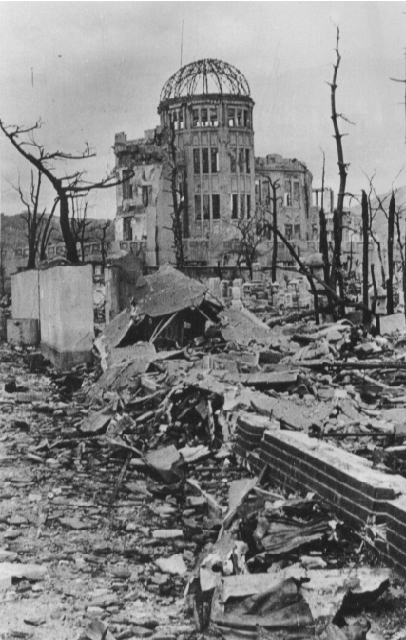
The Genbaku Dome amidst the devastation in October 1945. Photograph by Shigeo Hayashi, one of two photographers attached to the academic survey teams.

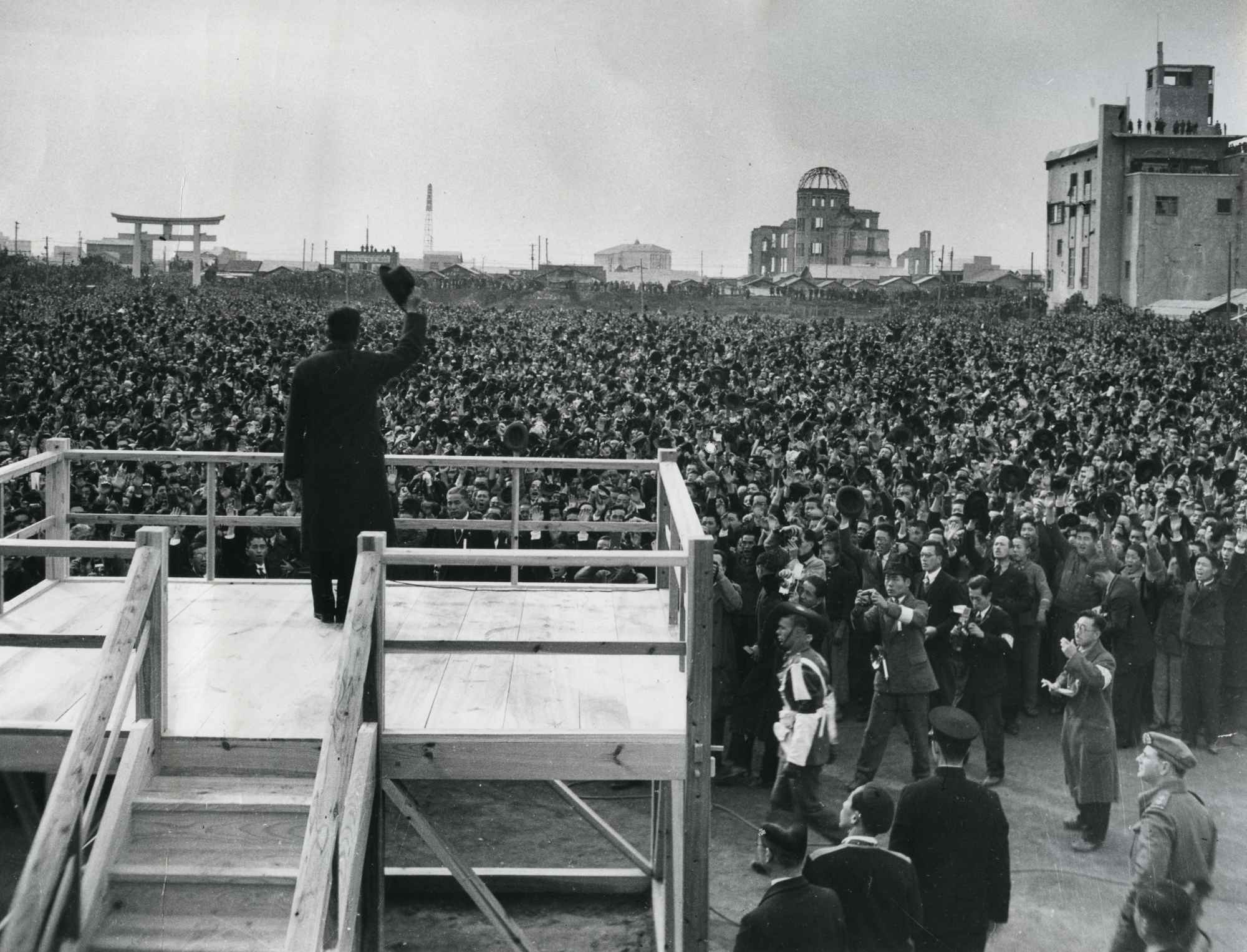
Emperor Hirohito visiting Hiroshima in 1947. The memorial can be seen in the background.

Due to its stone and steel structure, the building was the only structure left standing near the bomb's hypocenter. Soon commonly called the Genbaku ("A-Bomb") Dome, due to the exposed metal dome framework at its apex, the structure was scheduled to be demolished with the rest of the ruins, but most of the building was intact, delaying the demolition plans. The Dome became a subject of controversy, with some locals wanting it torn down while others wanted to preserve it as a memorial of the bombing and a symbol of peace. Ultimately, when the reconstruction of Hiroshima began, the building's skeletal remains were preserved.

From 1950 to 1964, the Hiroshima Peace Memorial Park was established around the Dome. In 1966, the Hiroshima City Council adopted a resolution on the permanent preservation of the Genbaku Dome, officially named the Hiroshima Peace Memorial (Genbaku Dome). The Dome remains the park's primary landmark.

Weathering and deterioration of the Genbaku Dome continued in the postwar period. In 1966, the Hiroshima City Council declared that it intended to indefinitely preserve the structure, now termed "Genbaku Dome". The first popularly elected mayor of Hiroshima, Shinzo Hamai sought funds for the preservation effort domestically and internationally. During one trip to Tokyo, Hamai resorted to collecting funds directly on the streets. Preservation work on the Genbaku Dome ended in 1967. The Dome has undergone two minor preservation projects to stabilize the ruin, notably between October 1989 and March 1990.

The Genbaku Dome stands almost exactly as it did after the bombing on 6 August 1945. Changes to the ruins, meant to ensure the structure's stability, have been minimal. A metal frame was installed inside to give the ruin more stability.

== As a political venue ==
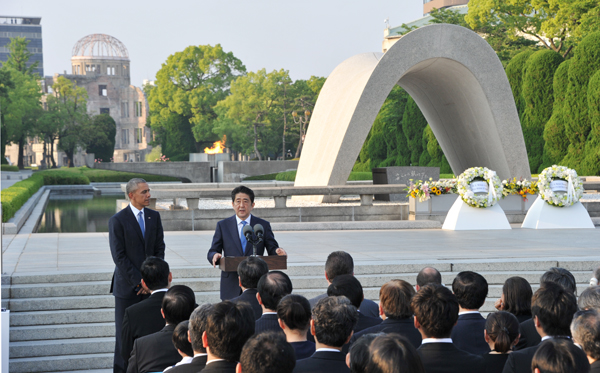
Barack Obama and Shinzo Abe in front of the memorial, 2016.

Barack Obama was the first sitting U.S. president to visit the Memorial on 27 May 2016. As an act of reciprocity, Japanese Prime Minister Shinzo Abe visited the USS Arizona Memorial in Honolulu the same year. The leaders of the 49th G7 summit visited the Memorial on 19 May 2023.

Domestically, the memorial is a common venue for antiwar, anti-nuclear weapons and anti-nuclear power protests. Hiroshima's municipal government holds the annual Hiroshima Peace Memorial Ceremony at the Memorial.

== UNESCO World Heritage Site ==
In December 1996, the Genbaku Dome was registered on the UNESCO World Heritage List based on the Convention for the Protection of the World Cultural and Natural Heritage. Its inclusion on the list is based on its survival of a destructive force, the first use of nuclear weapons on a human population, and its status as a symbol of peace.

Delegates to the World Heritage Committee from China and the U.S. had reservations about designating the memorial a World Heritage Site. China cited the possibility that the monument could be used to downplay the fact that the victim countries of Japan's aggression suffered the greatest losses of life during the war, and the U.S. said that a memorial to a war site would omit the necessary historical context. The U.S. dissociated itself from the decision.

== Gallery ==
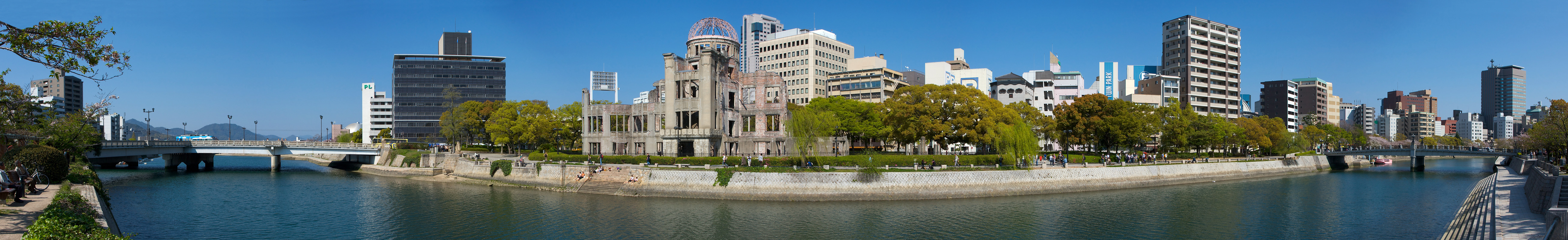
180° view of Hiroshima Peace Memorial Park. The Genbaku Dome can be seen in the center right of the image. The original target for the bomb was the T-shaped Aioi Bridge seen in the left of the image.
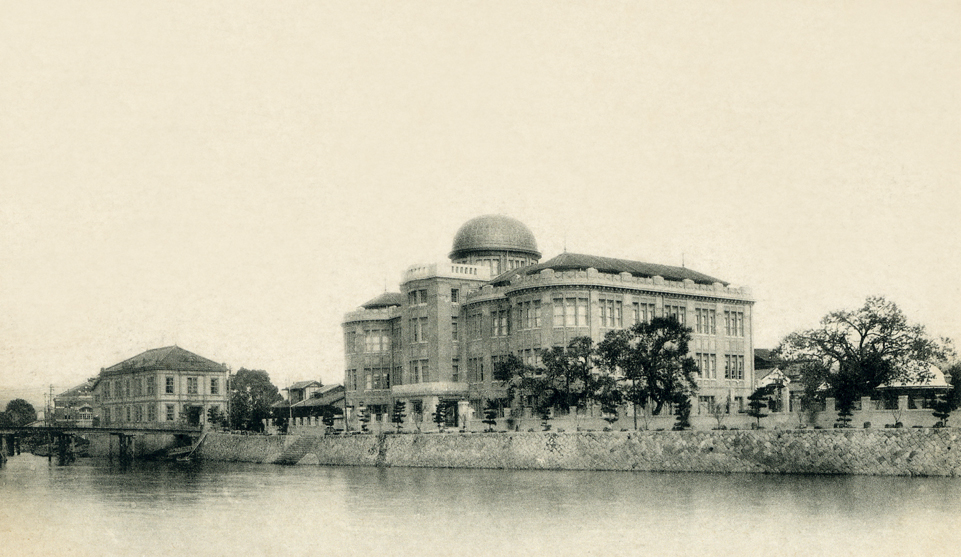
Products Exhibition Hall in its original condition (c. 1921–1933)

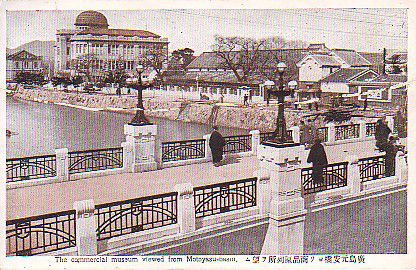
Hall, taken from Motoyasu Bridge (c. 1921–1933)

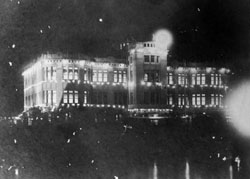
Nighttime photograph, 1921

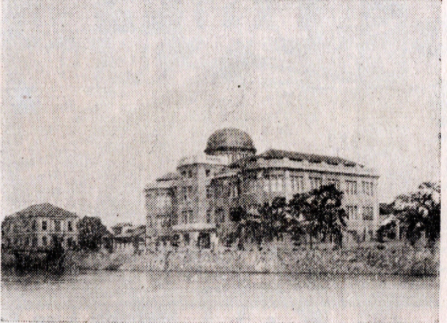
Photograph in March 1929

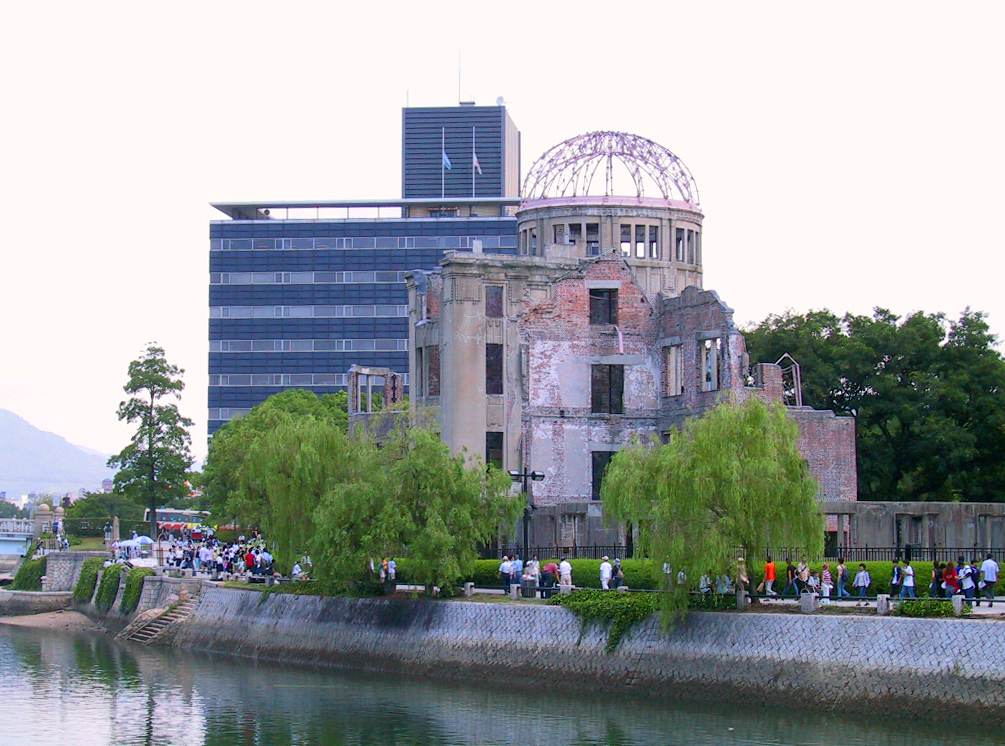
Citizens of the city pass by the Hiroshima Peace Memorial on their way to a memorial ceremony on 6 August 2004

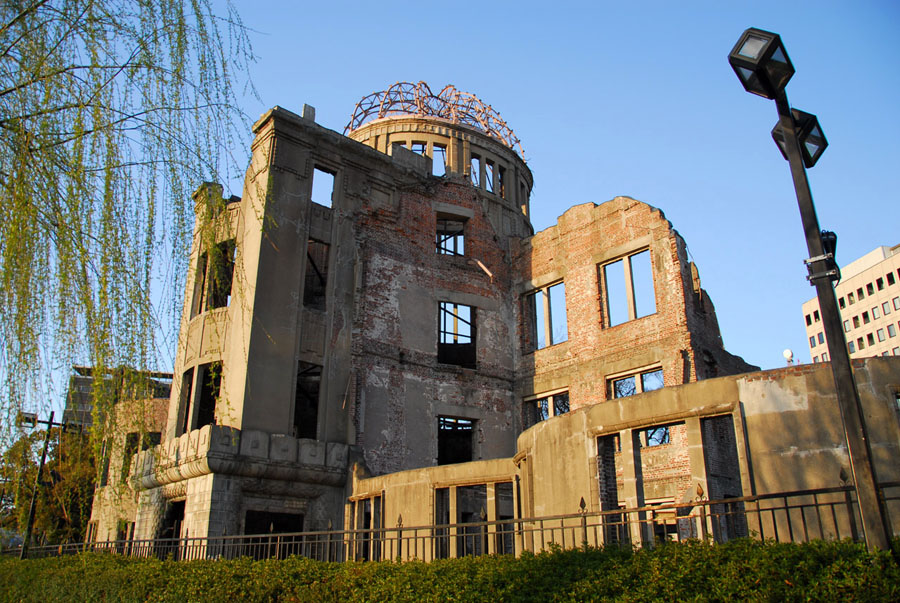
The Dome, photo taken from the southwest side

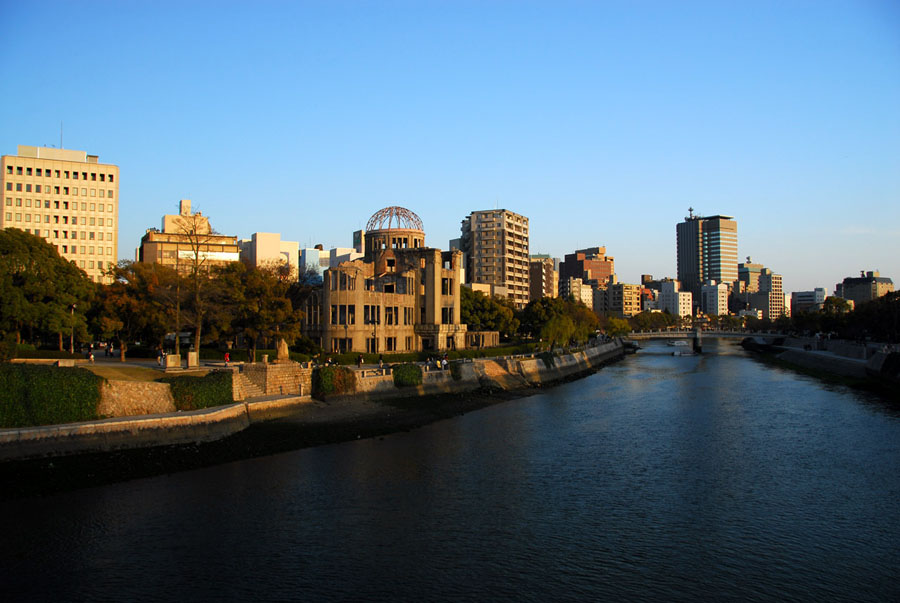
Distant view of the Dome; shot is taken from the Aioi Bridge

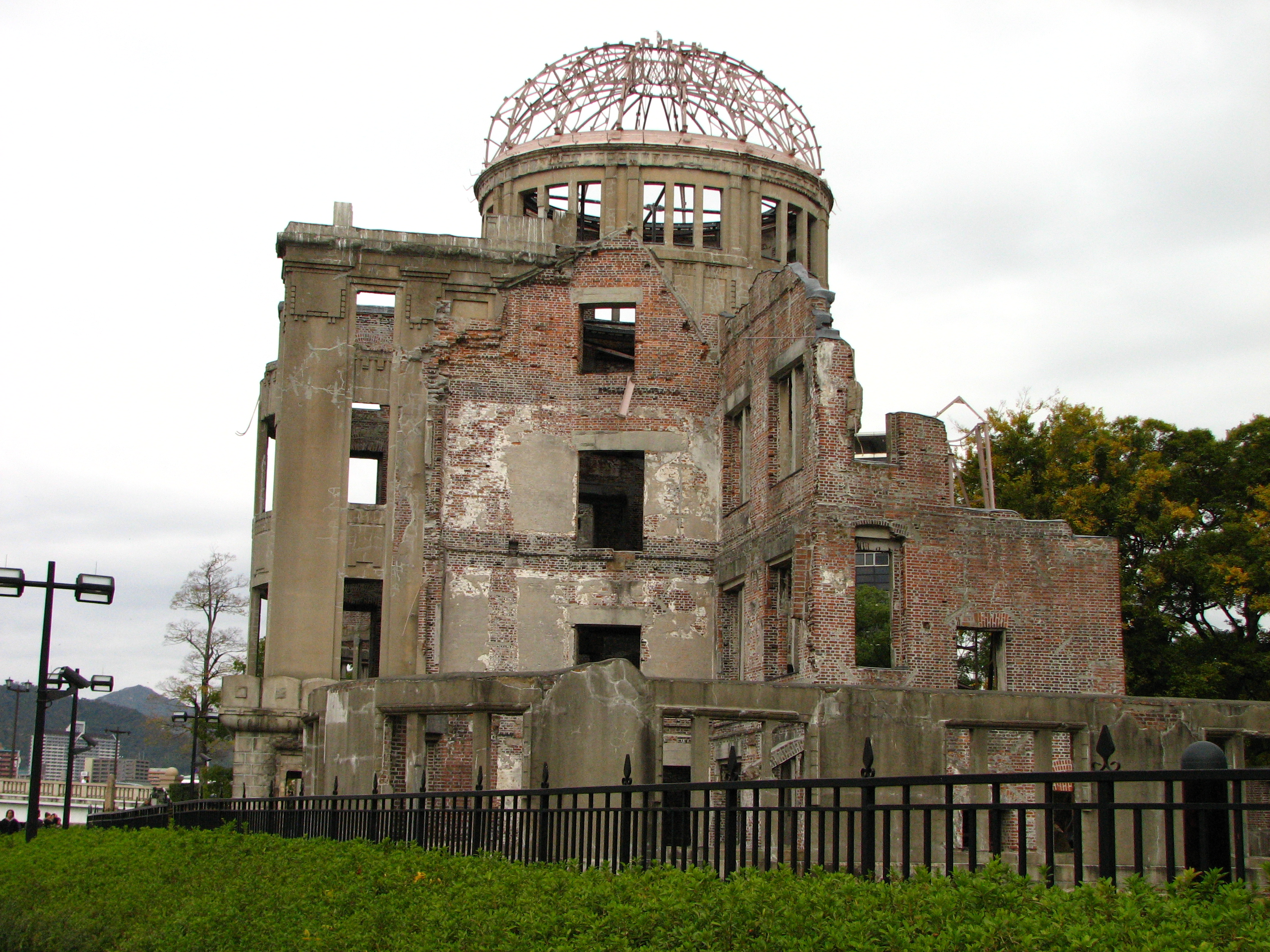
Side view of the Hiroshima Peace Memorial

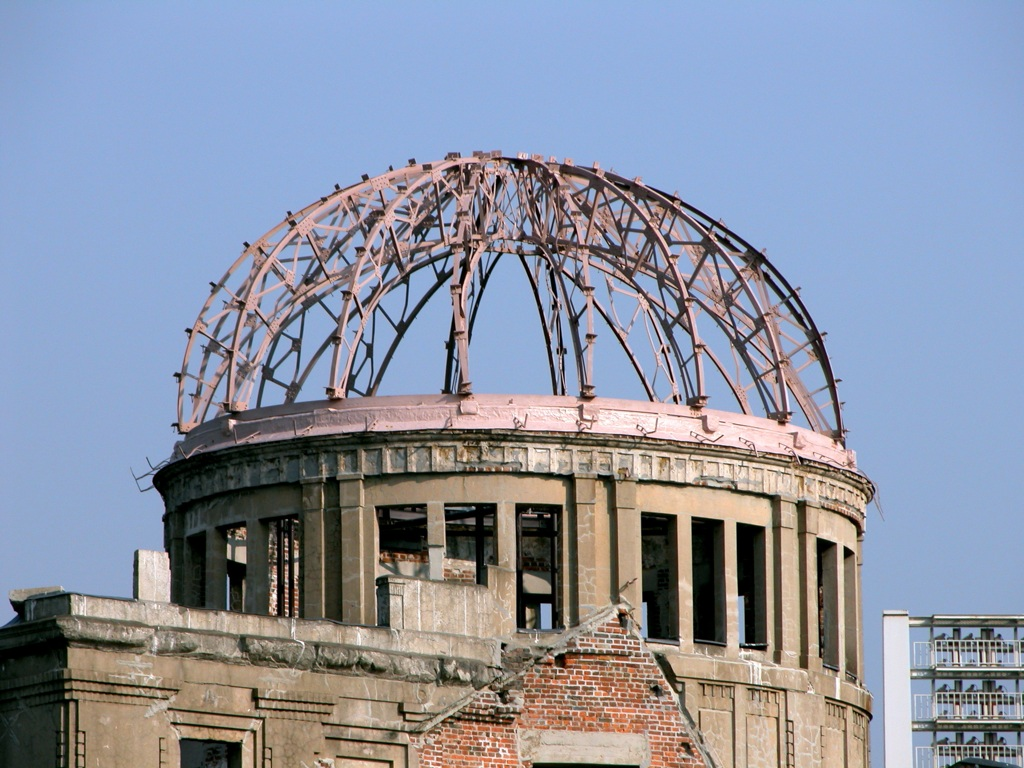
Close up of the dome

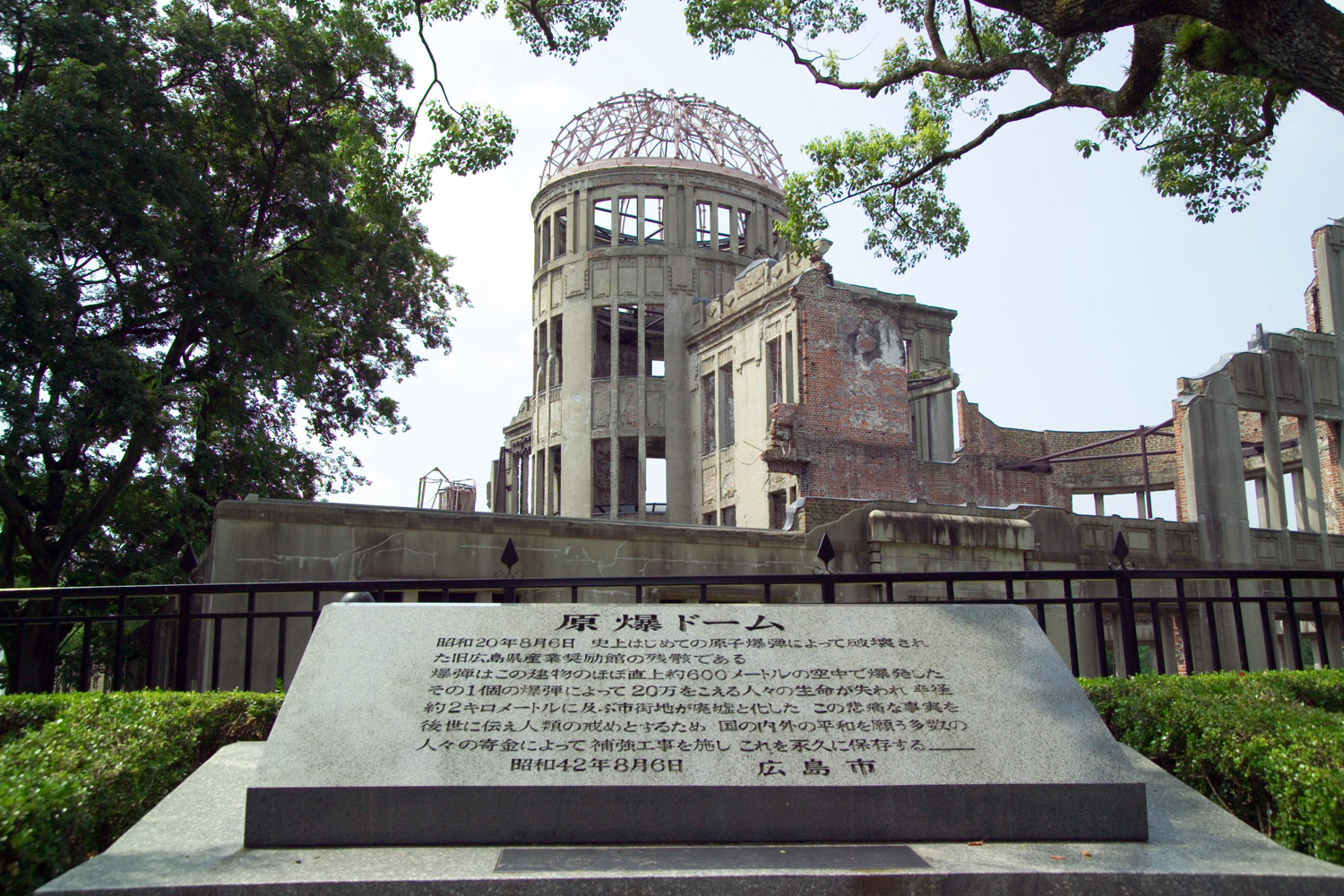
Dome with plaque

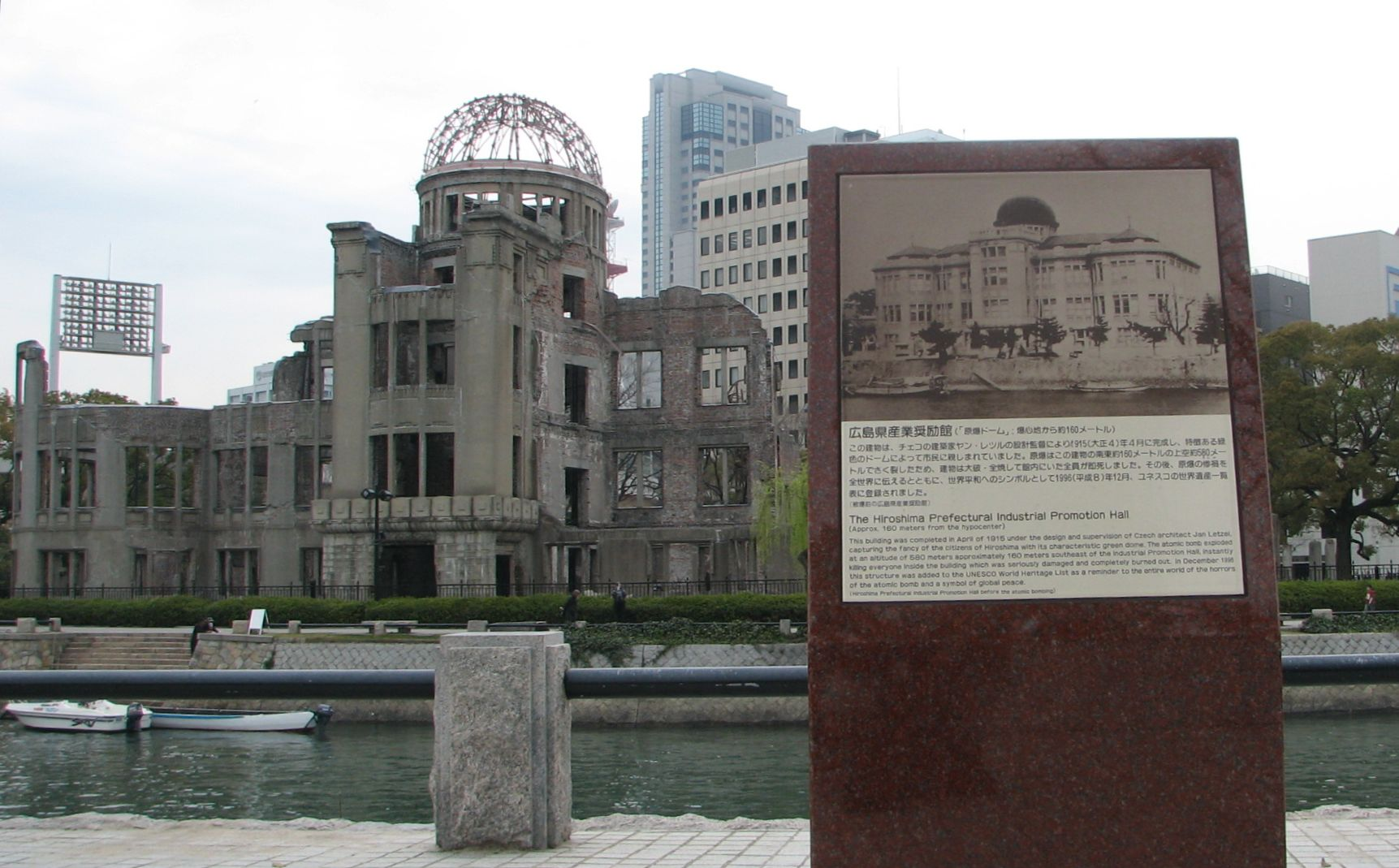
Peace Dome, then and now

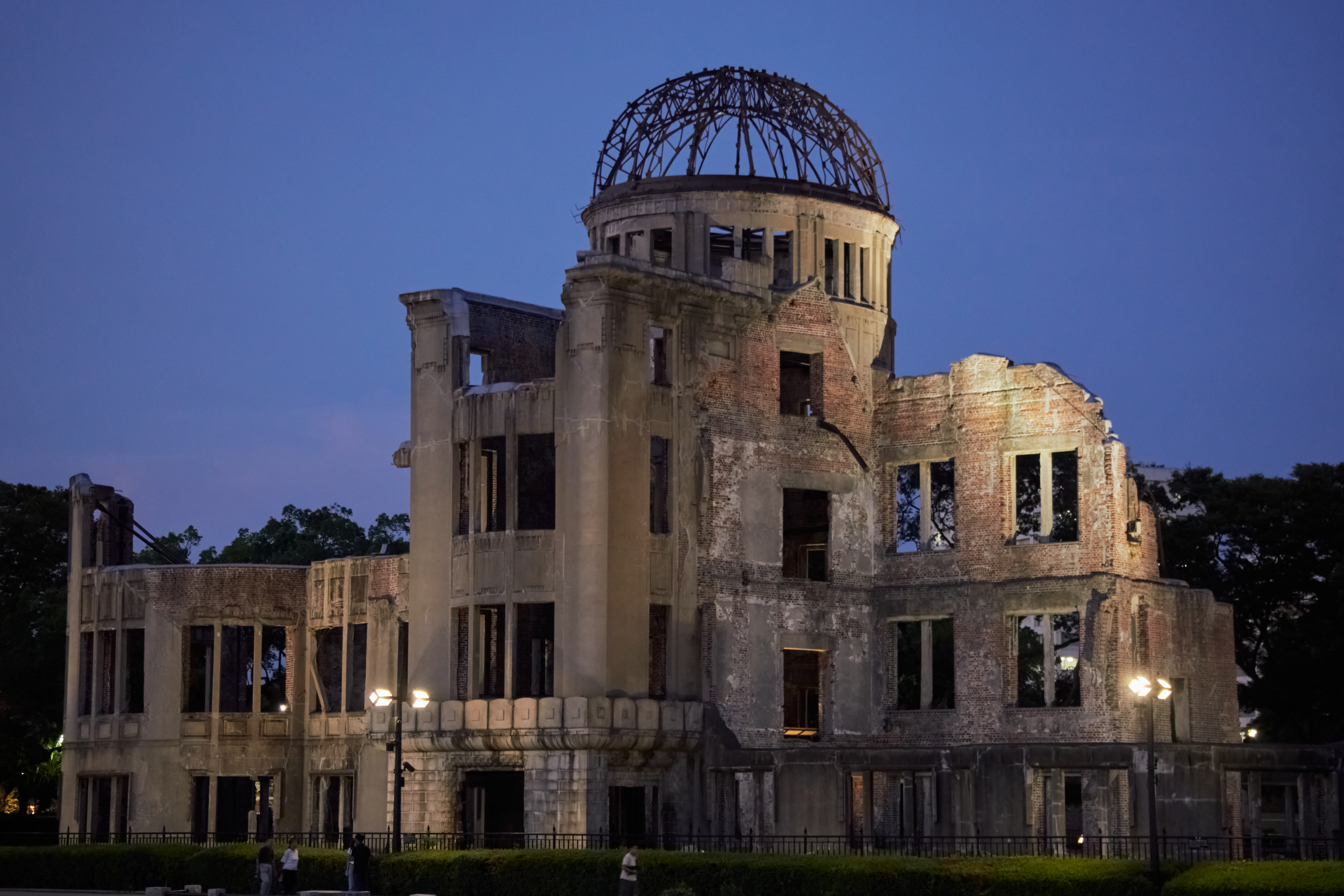
The Hiroshima Peace Memorial (Genbaku Dome) at dusk

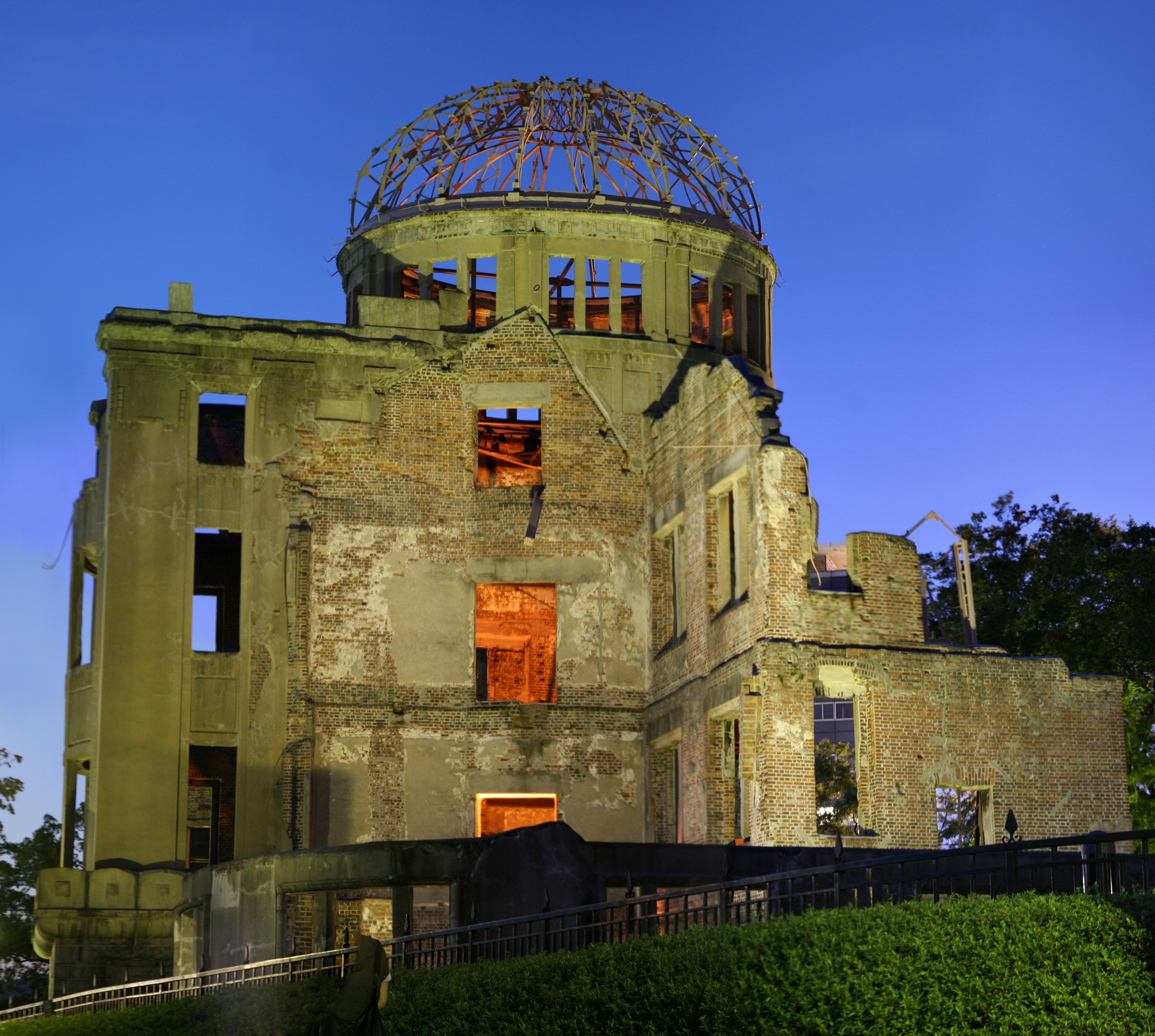
Genbaku Dome in 2007

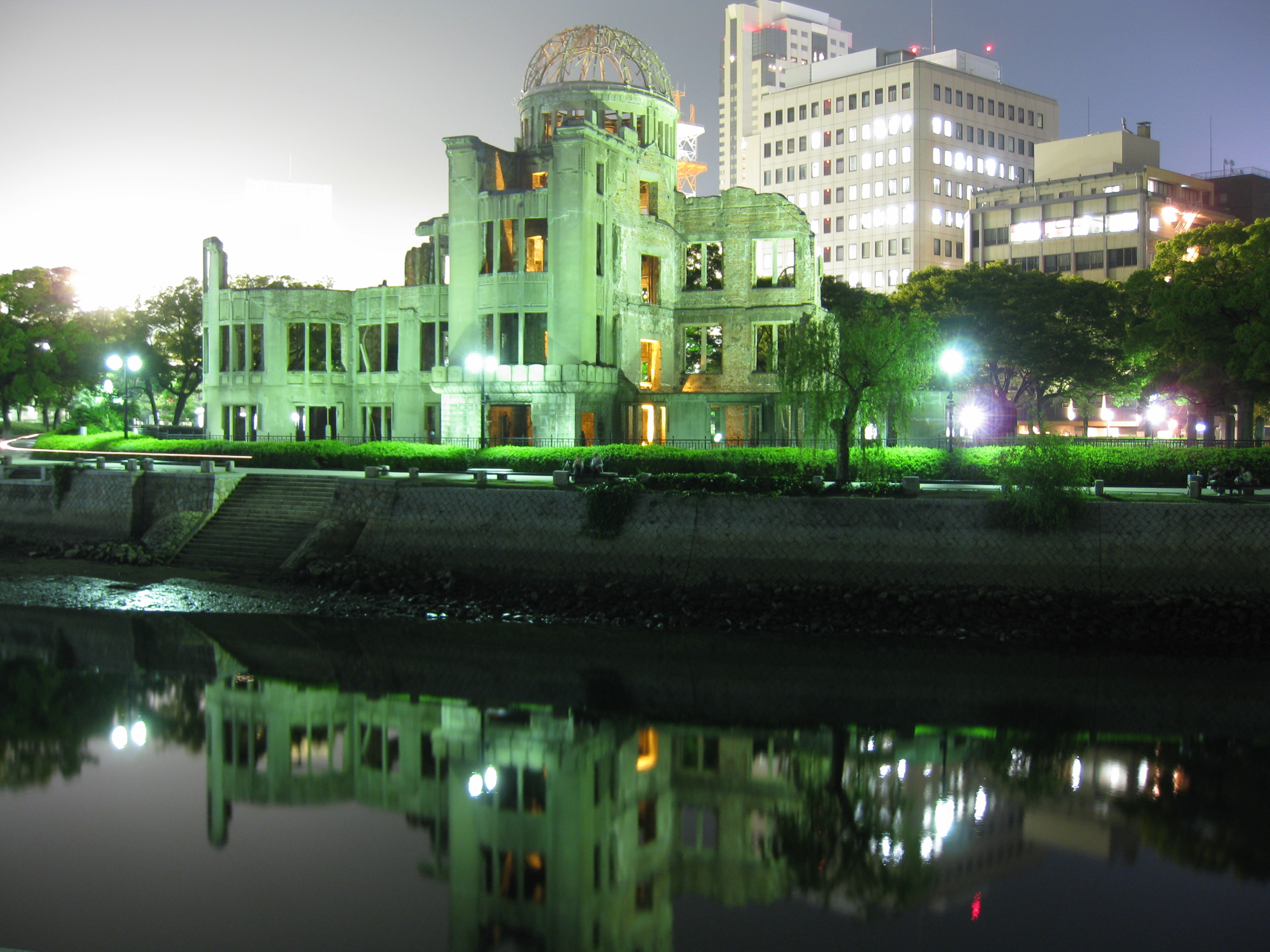
Genbaku Dome at night

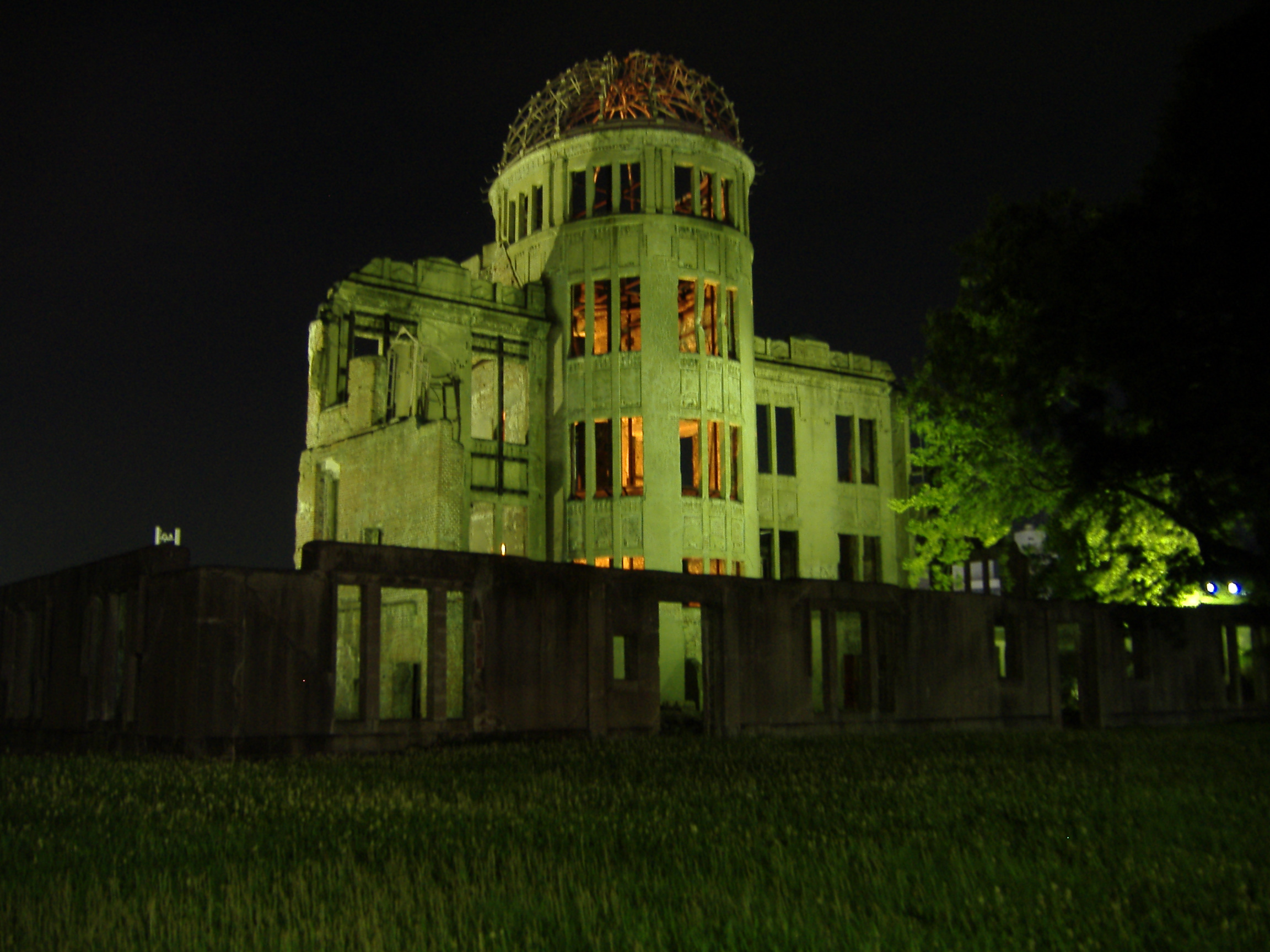
Genbaku Dome at night

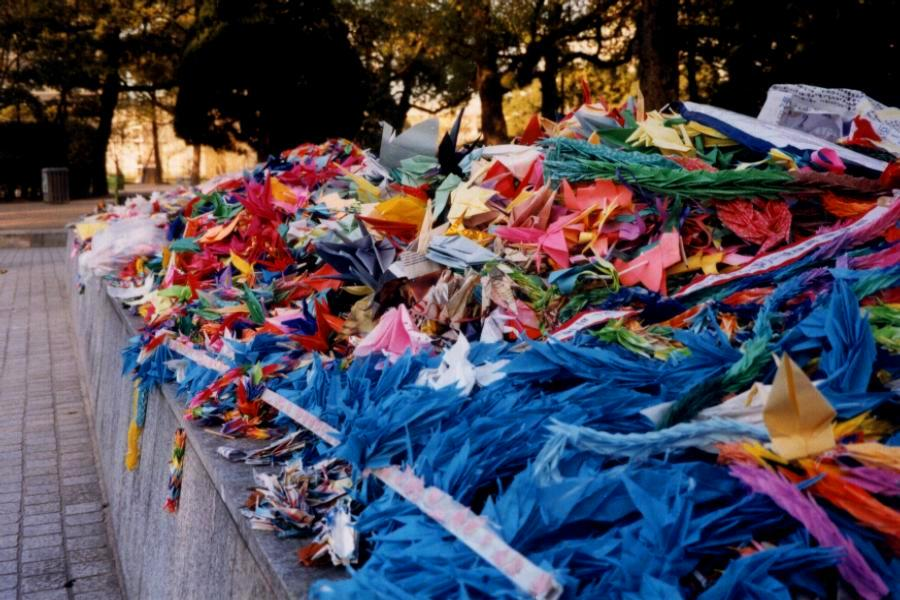
Origami cranes

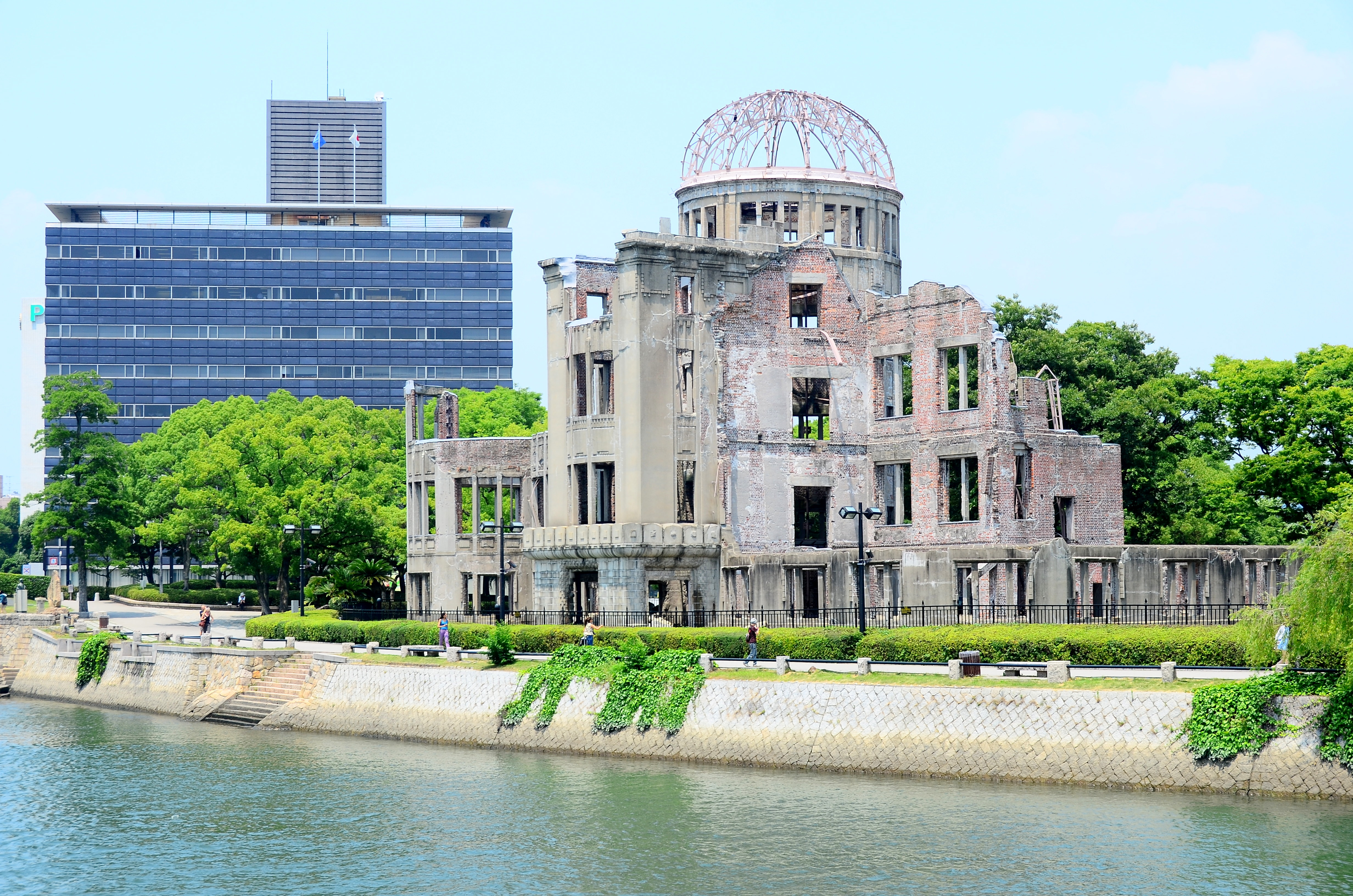
Hiroshima dome as seen from the memorial park

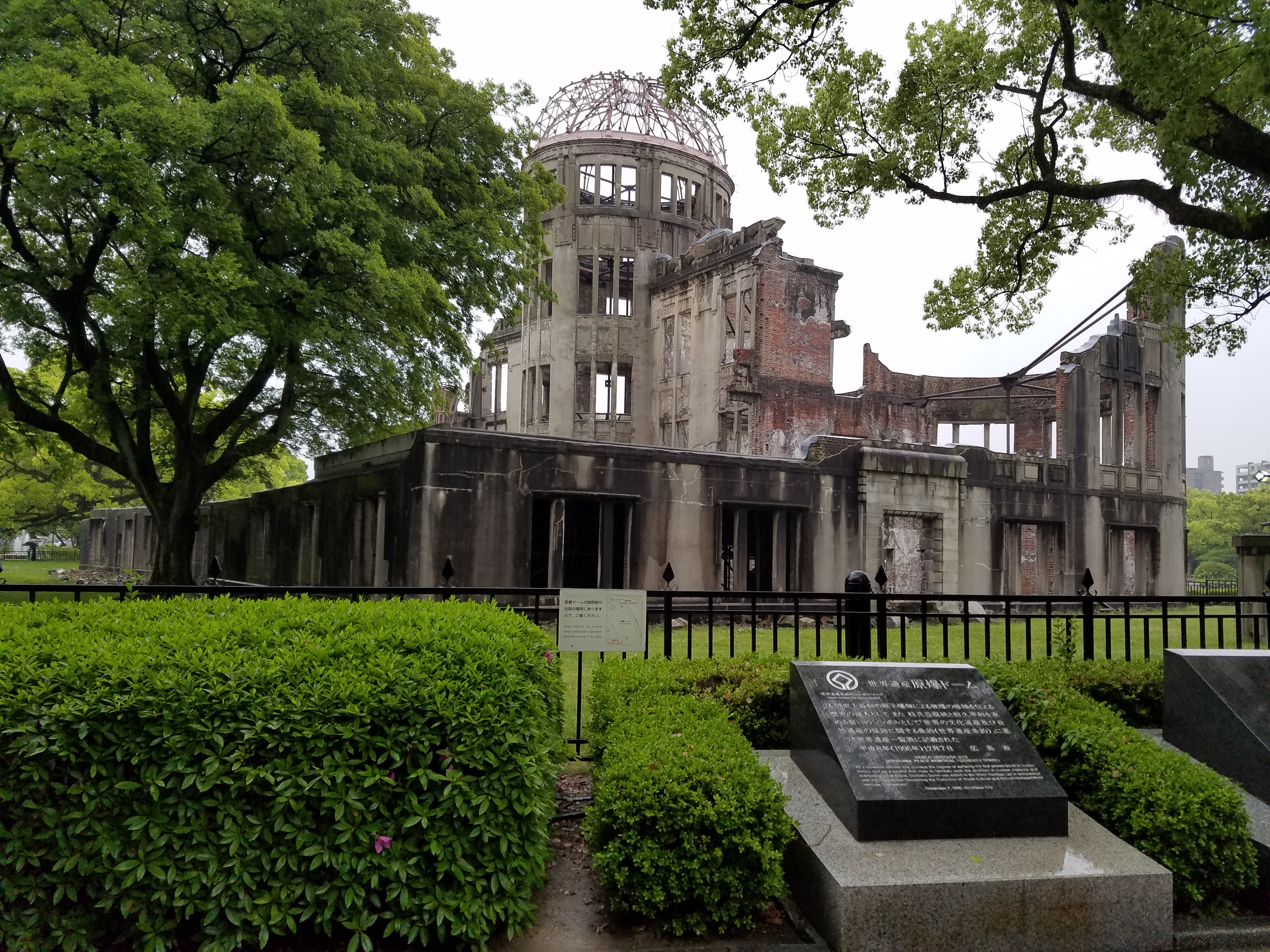
Overcast in the spring (May 2017)

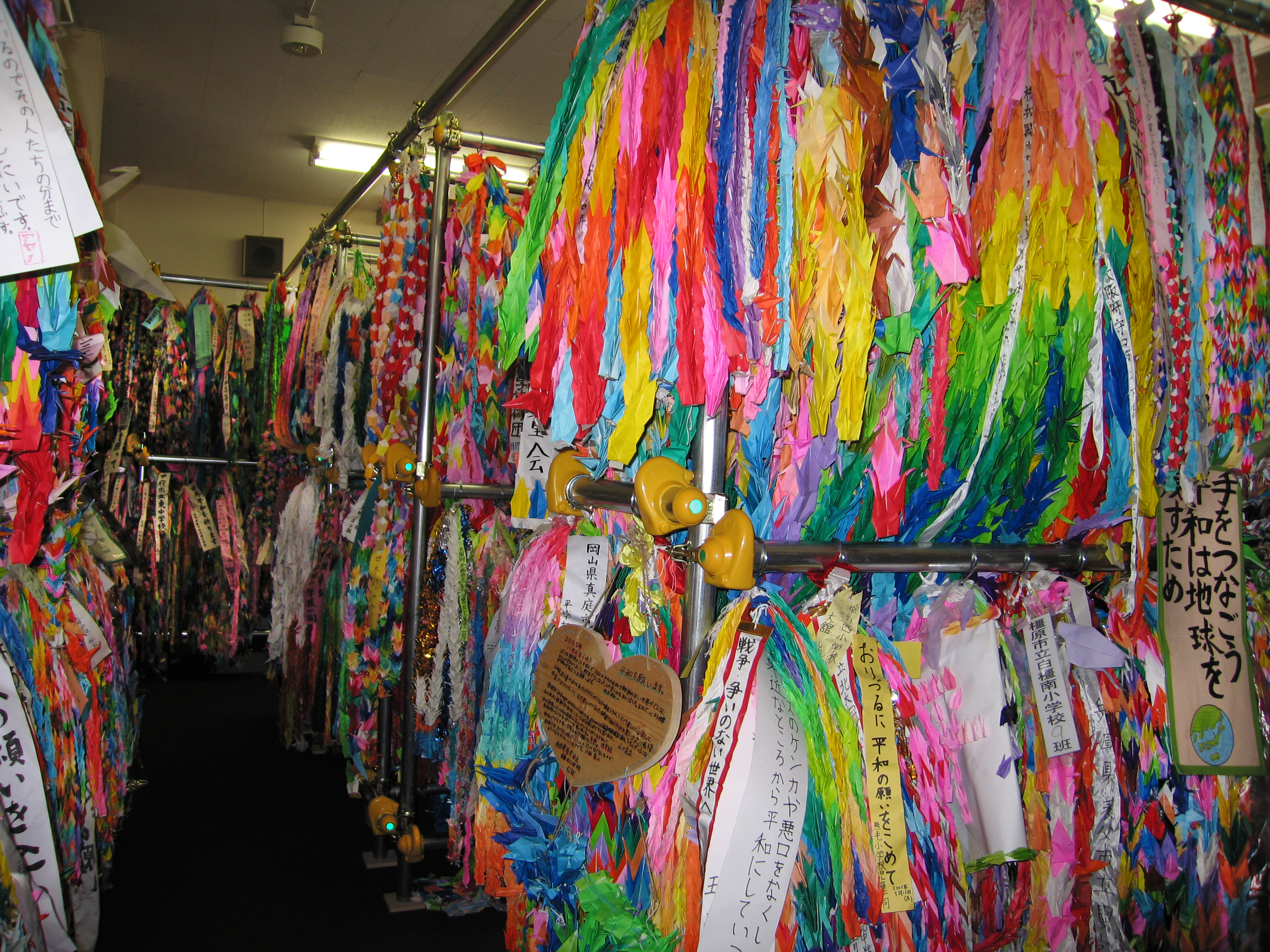
Origami cranes at Hiroshima Peace Memorial

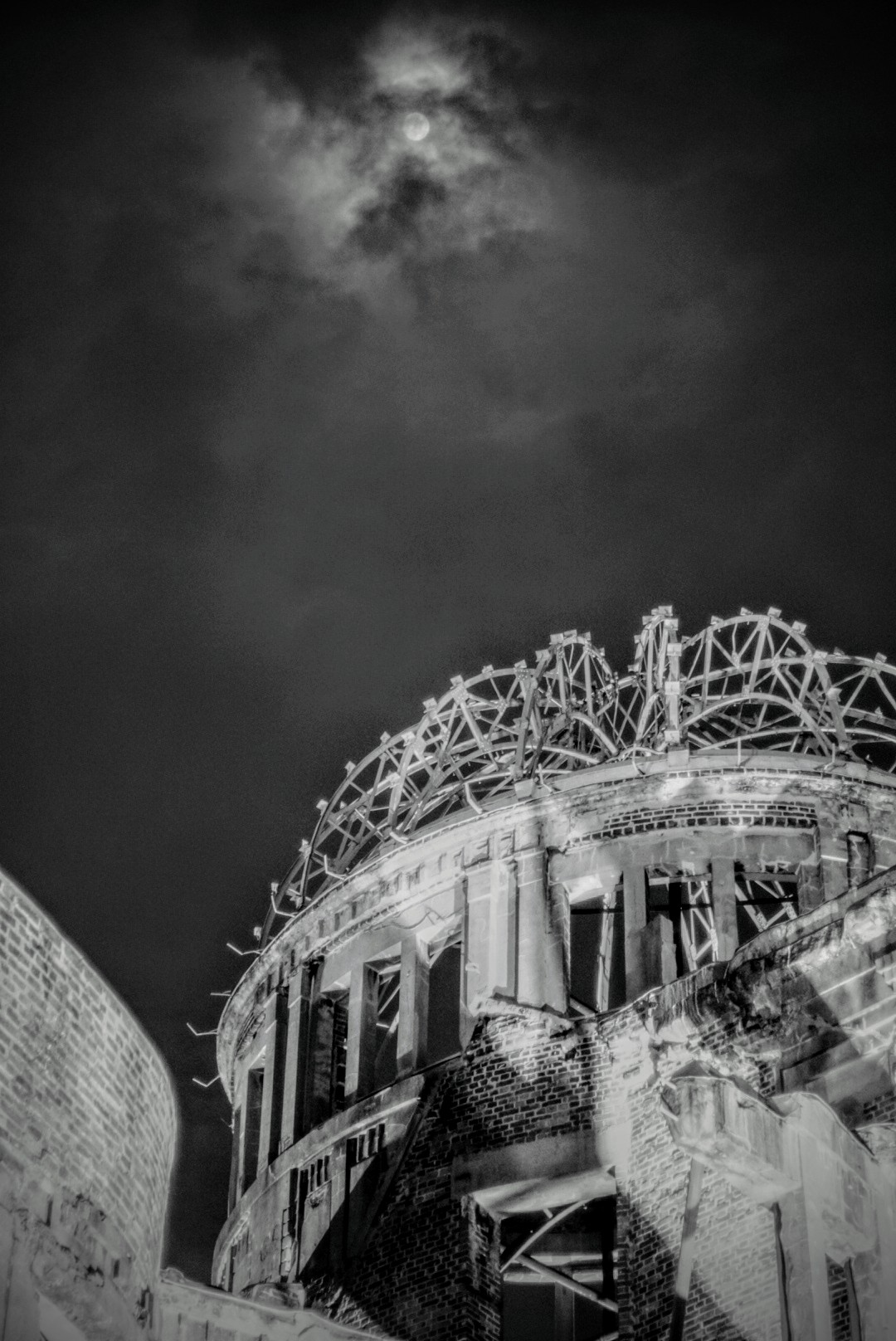
Genbaku Dome in moonlight (November 2018)

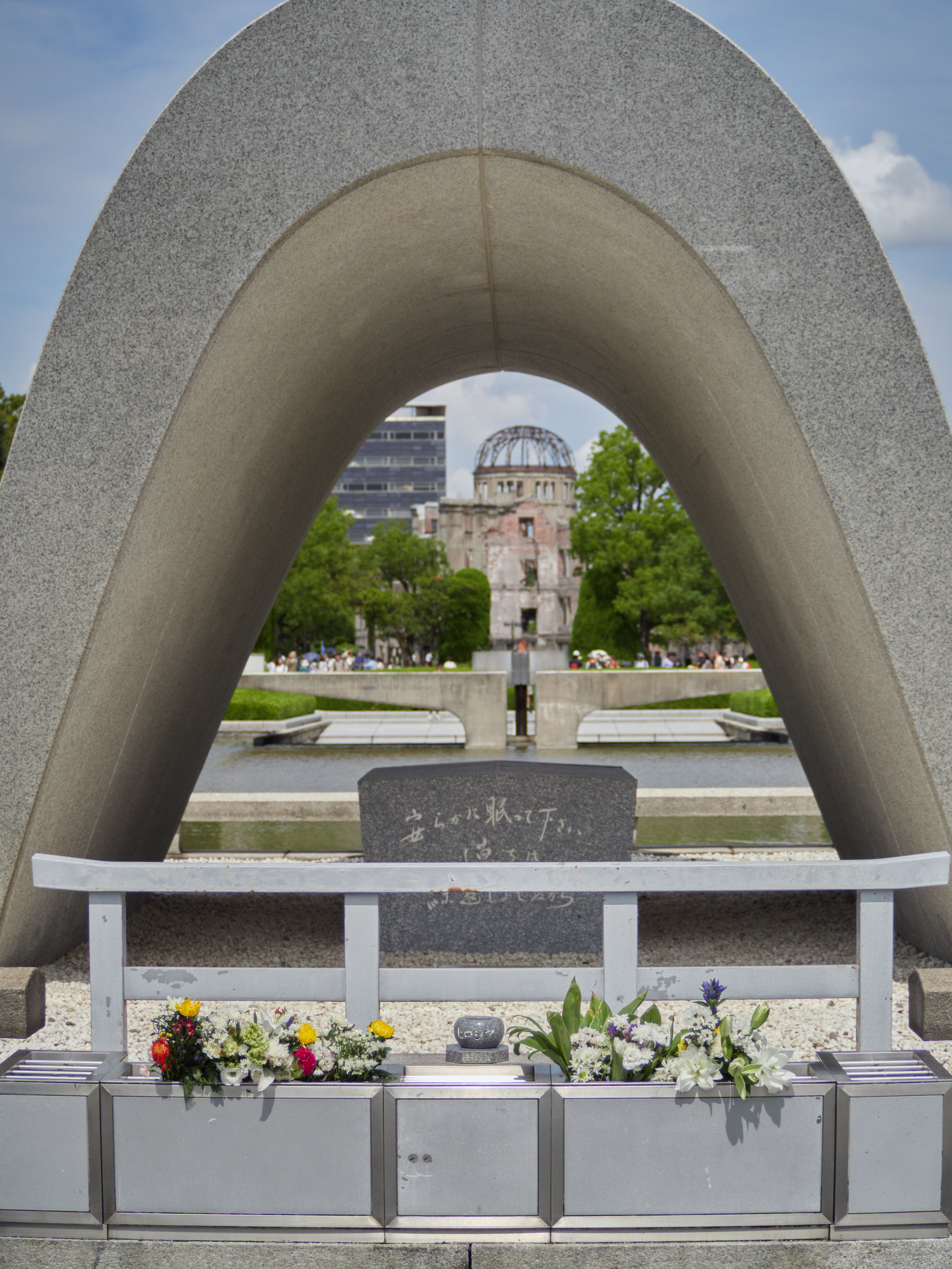
The Cenotaph for the A-bomb Victims at Hiroshima Peace Memorial Park, with the Atomic Bomb Dome visible through the arch.

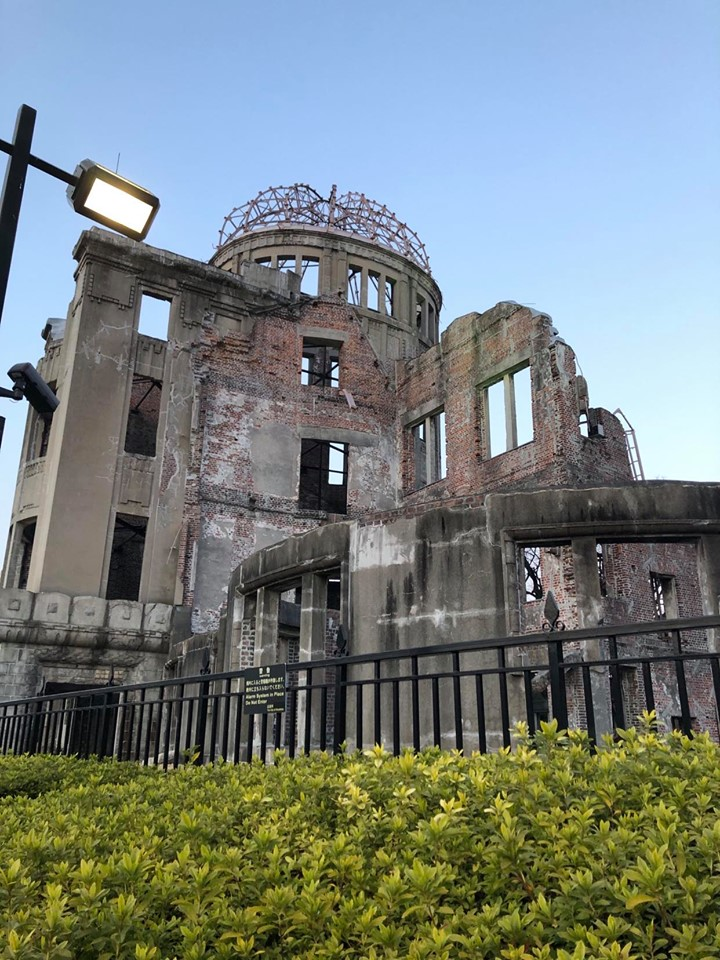
Atomic Bomb Dome pictured in 2020, 75 years after the bombing

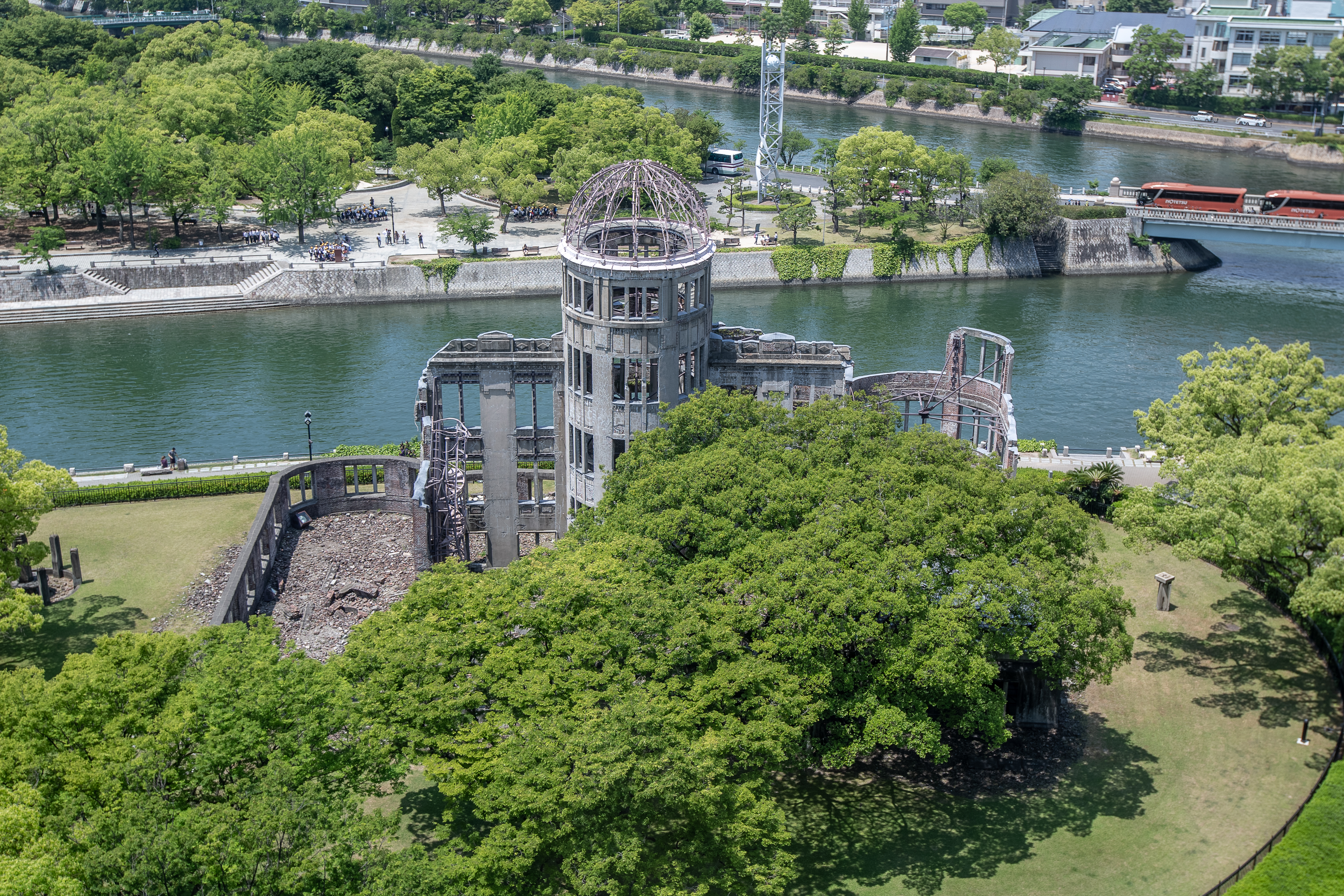
Genbaku Dome seen from Orizuru Tower in 2019

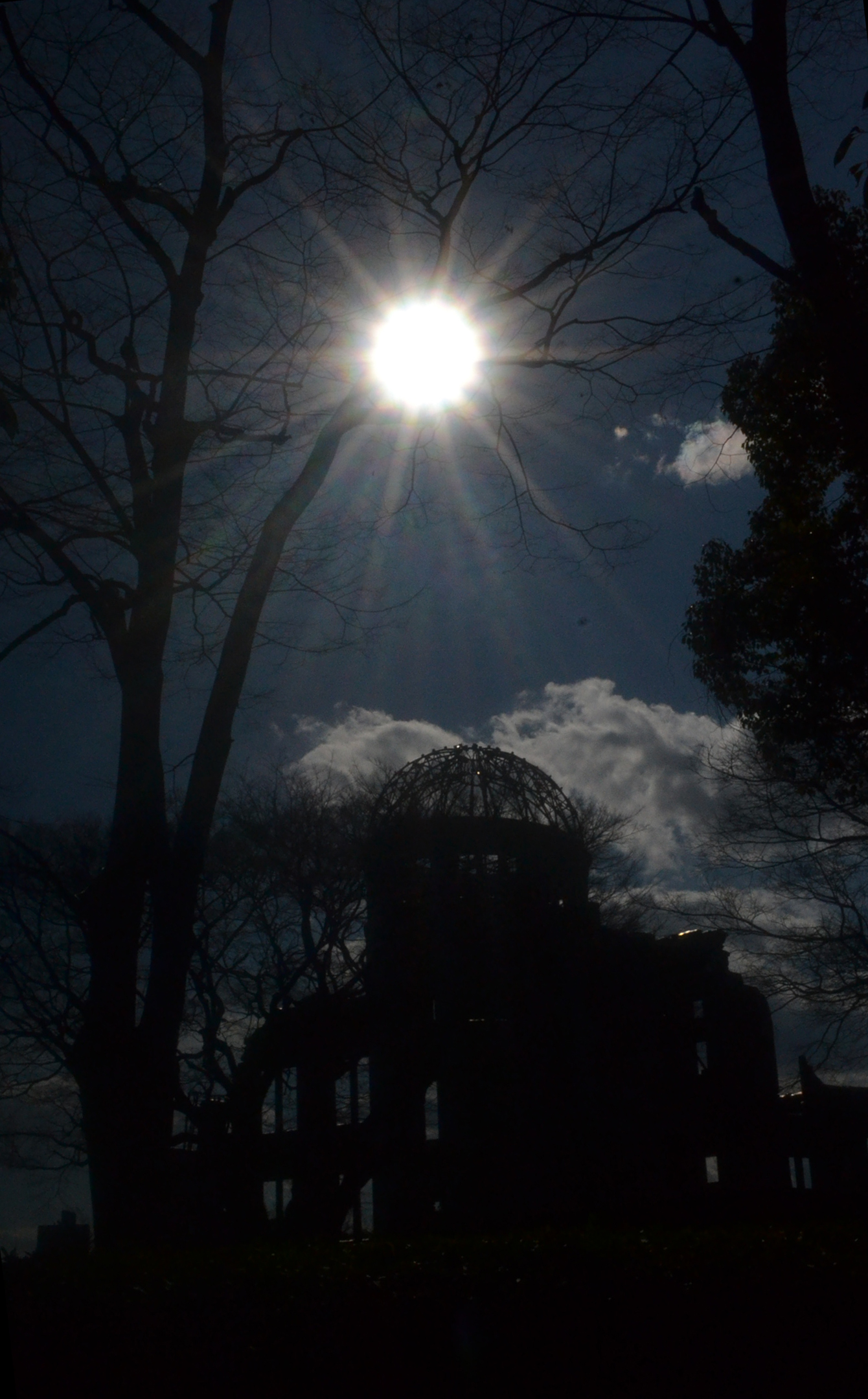
High noon sun over the Genbaku Dome silhouette on 13 February 2017.

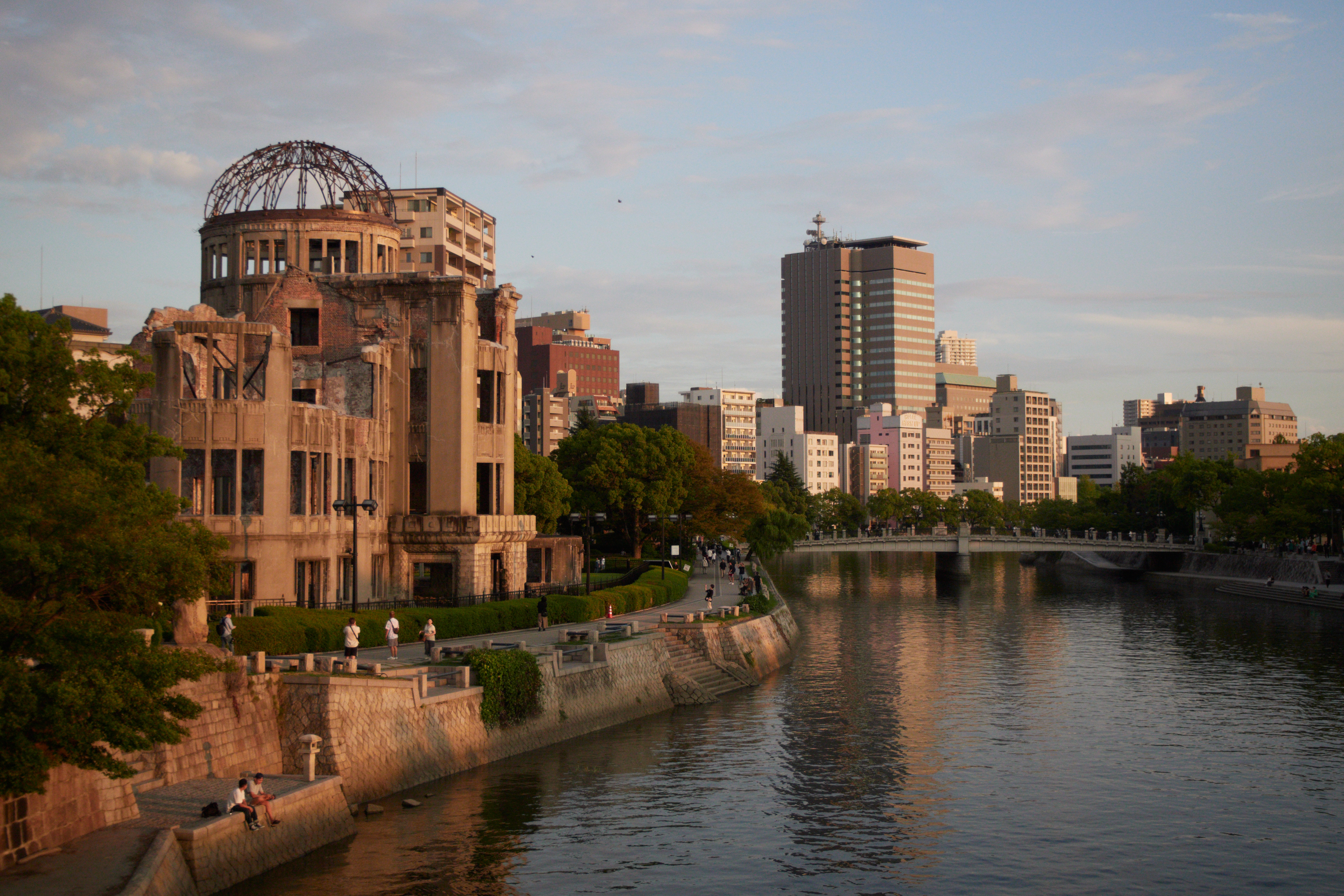
The Hiroshima Peace Memorial (Genbaku Dome) on the bank of the Motoyasu River, with the modern city skyline visible beyond, from the exact target - Aioi Bridge.

== See also ==
- Hiroshima Witness
- Kaiser Wilhelm Memorial Church
- St. Nicholas Church, Hamburg
- Coventry Cathedral
- Tourism in Japan
- List of World Heritage Sites in Japan
- The Ribbon International
