= Shin-Hakushima Station =

Railway station in Hiroshima, Japan

Shin-Hakushima Station 新白島駅
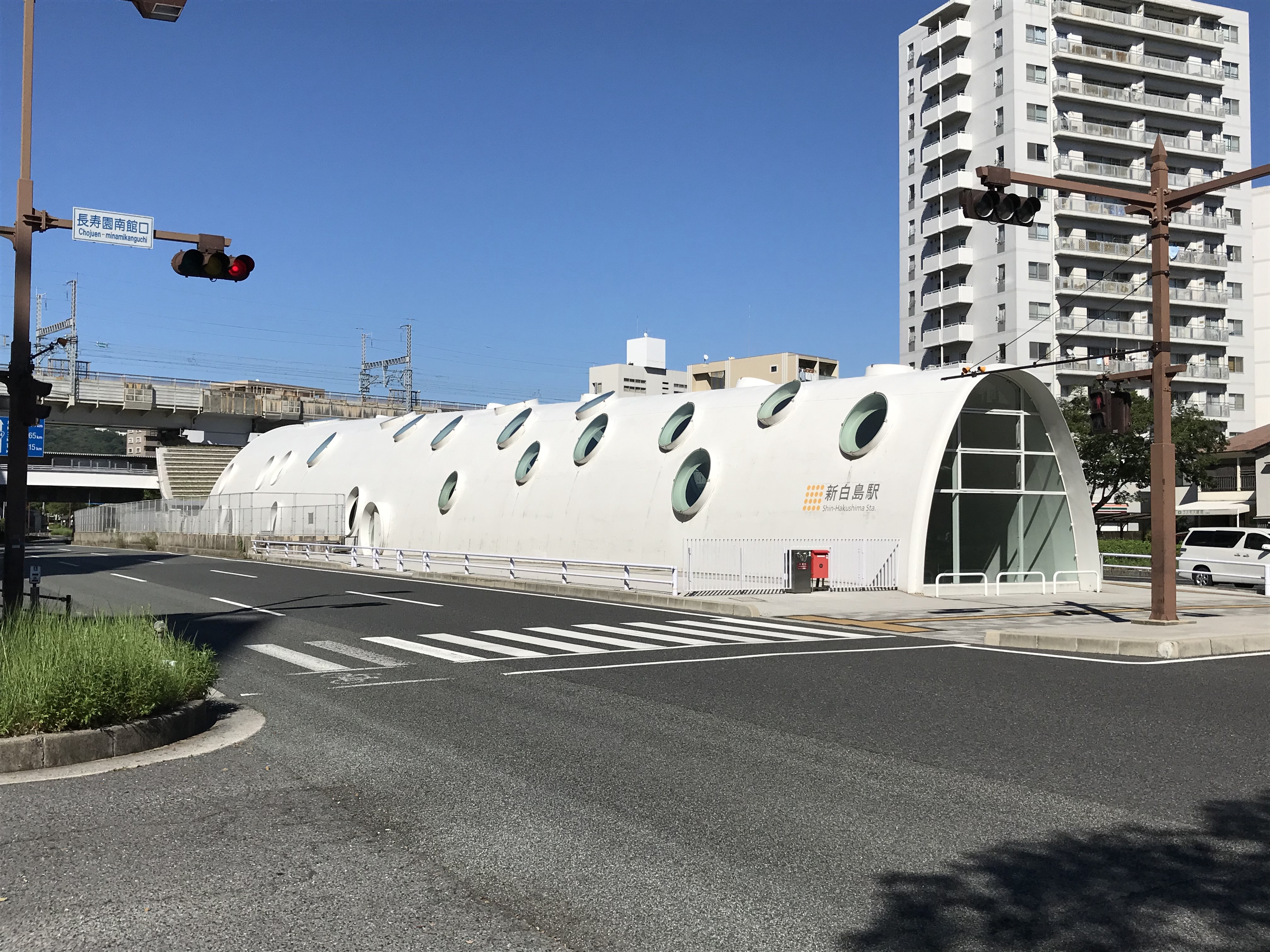
- The Astram Line station building. The JR station is partially visible in the background on the left, below the Shinkansen viaduct. (August 2020)

General information
- Location: 154-1 Nishihakushima-cho; Naka, Hiroshima; Japan
- Coordinates: 34°24′30″N 132°27′42″E
- Operator: JR West; Hiroshima Rapid Transit (HRT)
- Lines: San'yō Main Line; Astram Line
- Platforms: JR West: 2 side platforms; HRT: 1 island platform
- Tracks: JR West: 2; HRT: 2

Construction
- Structure type: JR West: Elevated; HRT: Underground

Other information
- Station code: JR West: JR-R02; JR-B02

History
- Opened: 14 March 2015; 11 years ago

Passengers
- FY2020: 9,773 daily (JR West)
- FY2015: 4,273 daily (HRT)

Services
Preceding station	JR West	Following station
Yokogawa towards Iwakuni	San'yō Line Rapid	Hiroshima Terminus
Yokogawa towards Iwakuni	San'yō Line Local	Hiroshima Terminus
Yokogawa towards Aki-Kameyama	Kabe Line	Hiroshima Terminus
Preceding station	Hiroshima Rapid Transit	Following station
Jōhoku towards Hondōri	Astram Line	Hakushima towards Kōiki-kōen-mae
Location
- Location within Hiroshima Prefecture Location within Japan

Shin-Hakushima Station (Japanese: 新白島駅, Hepburn: Shin-Hakushima-eki) is an infill railway station on the Sanyō Main Line, Kabe Line, and the Astram Line in Naka-ku, Hiroshima, Japan. It is operated by West Japan Railway Company and Hiroshima Rapid Transit.

== Lines ==
Shin-Hakushima Station is served by the following lines:

- JR West

- R Sanyo Main Line
- B Kabe Line

- Hiroshima Rapid Transit

- Astram Line

== Station layout ==
=== JR West ===
JR West eastbound station building in February 2026

The JR West station consists of two staggered side platforms serving two tracks. Each platform is accessed through a separate station building. A convenience store is located in the westbound ticket hall. Outside the ticket barriers, there is an underpass connecting the two buildings. A dedicated walkway connects the JR West and Astram Line stations.

==== Platforms ====
1	■ Sanyo Main Line	for Yokogawa, Miyajimaguchi, Iwakuni, and Tokuyama
1	■ Kabe Line	for Yokogawa, Ōmachi, Kabe, and Aki-Kameyama
2	■ Sanyo Main Line	for Hiroshima, Saijō, Mihara, connection to Kure Line
2	■ Kabe Line	for Hiroshima

=== Astram Line ===
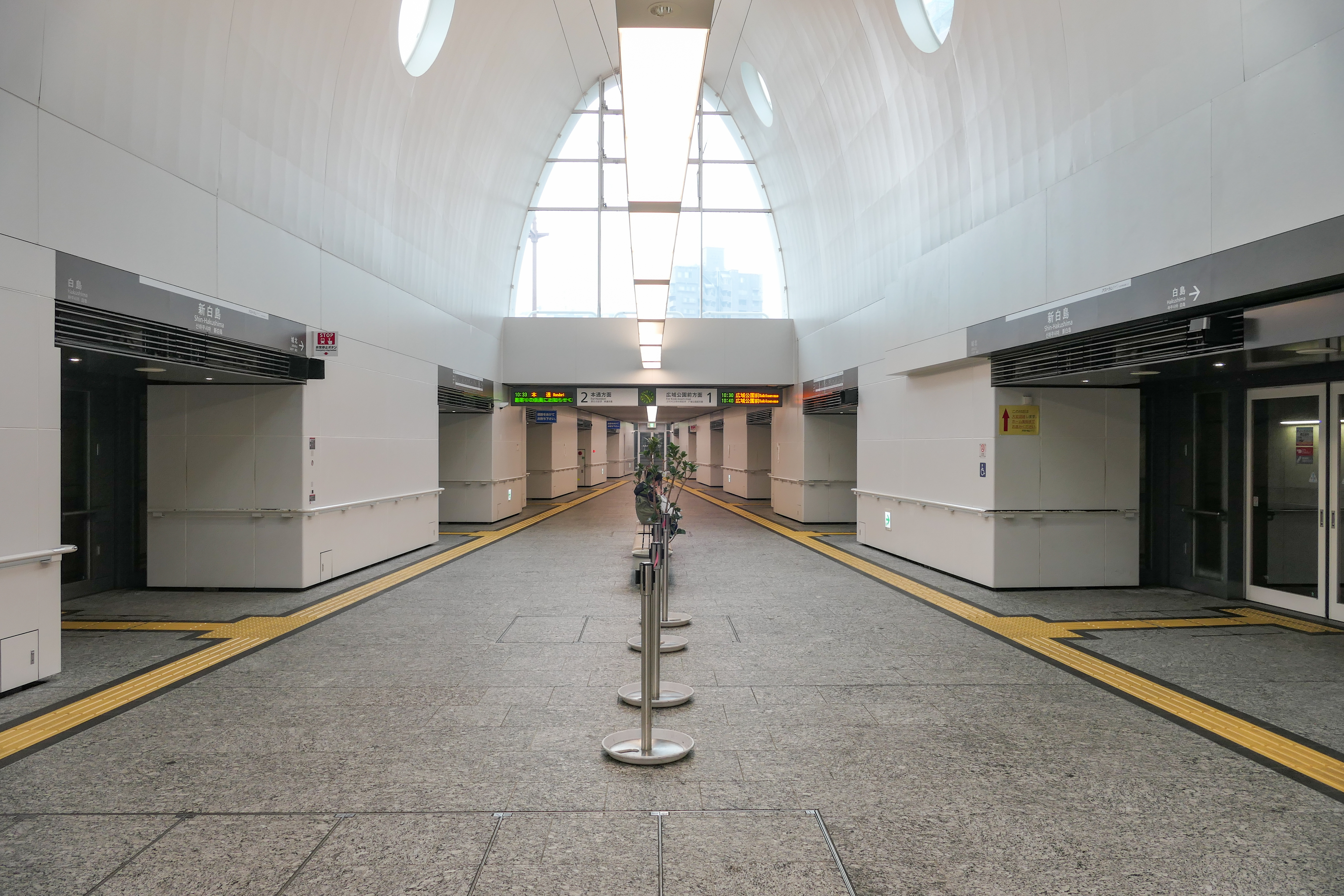
Astram Line platform in December 2023

The Astram Line station has 1 island platform serving two tracks. The platform forms a triangular shape, with the station exit at the wide end of the platform. There is an emergency exit at the other end. To the north of the station, the track immediately leaves the tunnel and transitions to an elevated track after passing under the JR West station.

==== Platforms ====
1	■ Astram Line	for Kōiki-kōen-mae
2	■ Astram Line	for Hondōri

== History ==
The station was built to allow a direct connection between the Astram Line and the Sanyo Main Line. Initial plans were to have a circular shell cover the entire passageway connecting the Astram Line and JR West stations. The contract for design was awarded to C+A Coelacanth and Associates in 2012, with a planned opening sometime in 2014. However, structural concerns caused the opening to be delayed by one year, and caused the circular shell to be cut back so it no longer covered the passageway. The station opened on 14 March 2015. A green roof was later installed in the passageway sometime during 2015.
