= Nakasuji Station =

Railway station in Hiroshima, Japan

Nakasuji 中筋駅
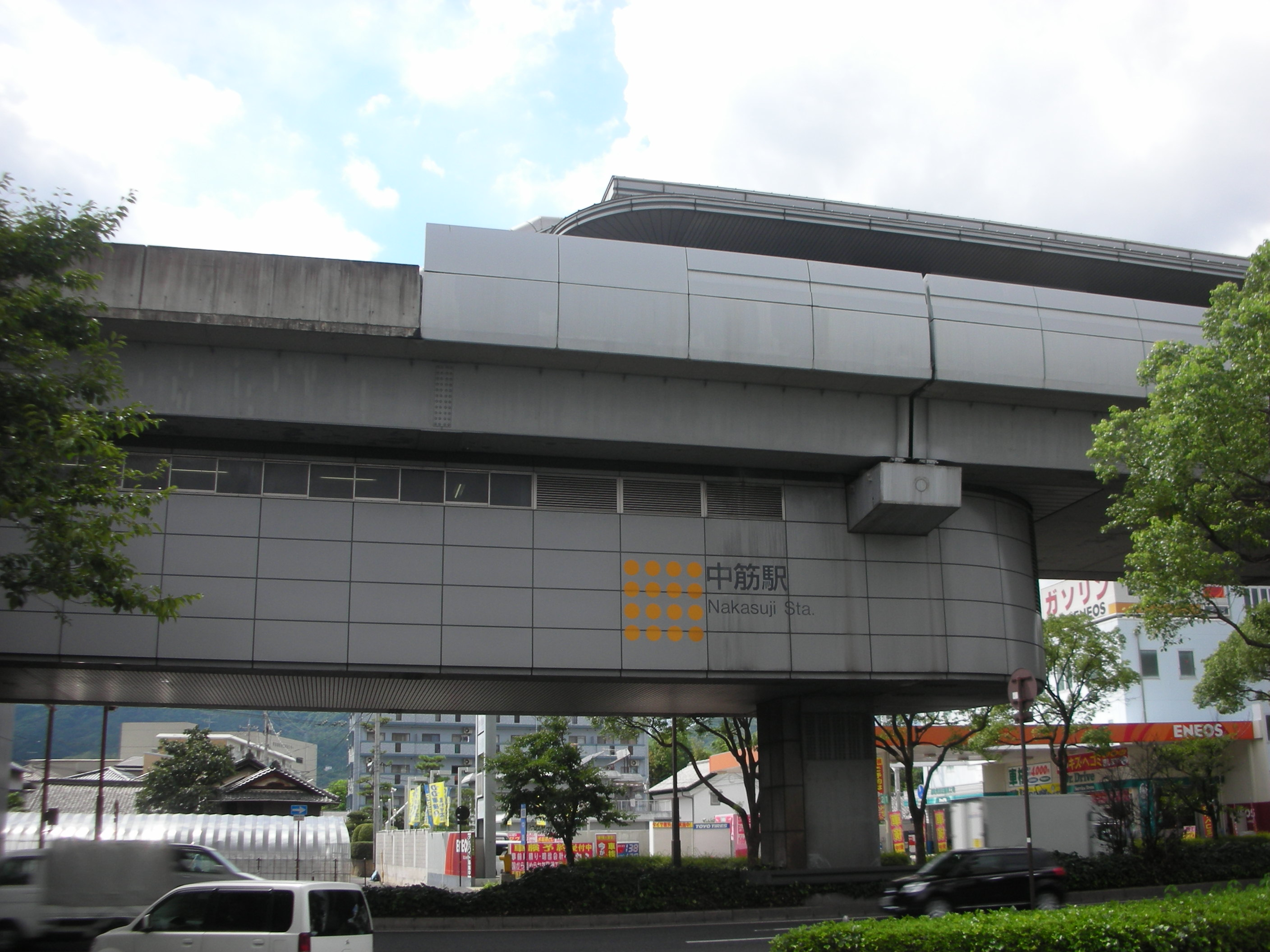
- Nakasuji Station

General information
- Location: 2-6-17, Nakasuji, Asaminami-ku, Hiroshima; Japan
- Coordinates: 34°27′06″N 132°28′36″E
- Line: Astram Line
- Platforms: 1 island platform

Construction
- Structure type: Elevated station

History
- Opened: 20 August 1994; 31 years ago

Services
Preceding station	Hiroshima Rapid Transit	Following station
Nishihara towards Hondōri	Astram Line	Furuichi towards Kōiki-kōen-mae
Location
- Location within Hiroshima Prefecture Location within Japan

Nakasuji Station is a HRT station on Astram Line, located in 2-6-17, Nakasuji, Asaminami-ku, Hiroshima.

== Platforms ==
1	█	for Kōiki-kōen-mae
2	█	for Hondōri

== Connections ==
█ Astram Line
●Nishihara — ●Nakasuji — ●Furuichi

== Bus services connections ==
=== Local bus ===
- Hiroden Bus
- Chugoku JR Bus
- Hiroshima Bus
- Geiyo Bus
- Hiroshima Kotsu

== Around station ==
- Bus Terminal
- Hiroshima City Asaminami Ward Office
- JA Hiroshima
- San'yō Expressway
- Japan National Route 54 (Gion Shindo)

== History ==
- Opened on August 20, 1994.

== See also ==
- Astram Line
- Hiroshima Rapid Transit
