= Kamiyasu Station =

Railway station in Hiroshima, Japan

Kamiyasu 上安駅
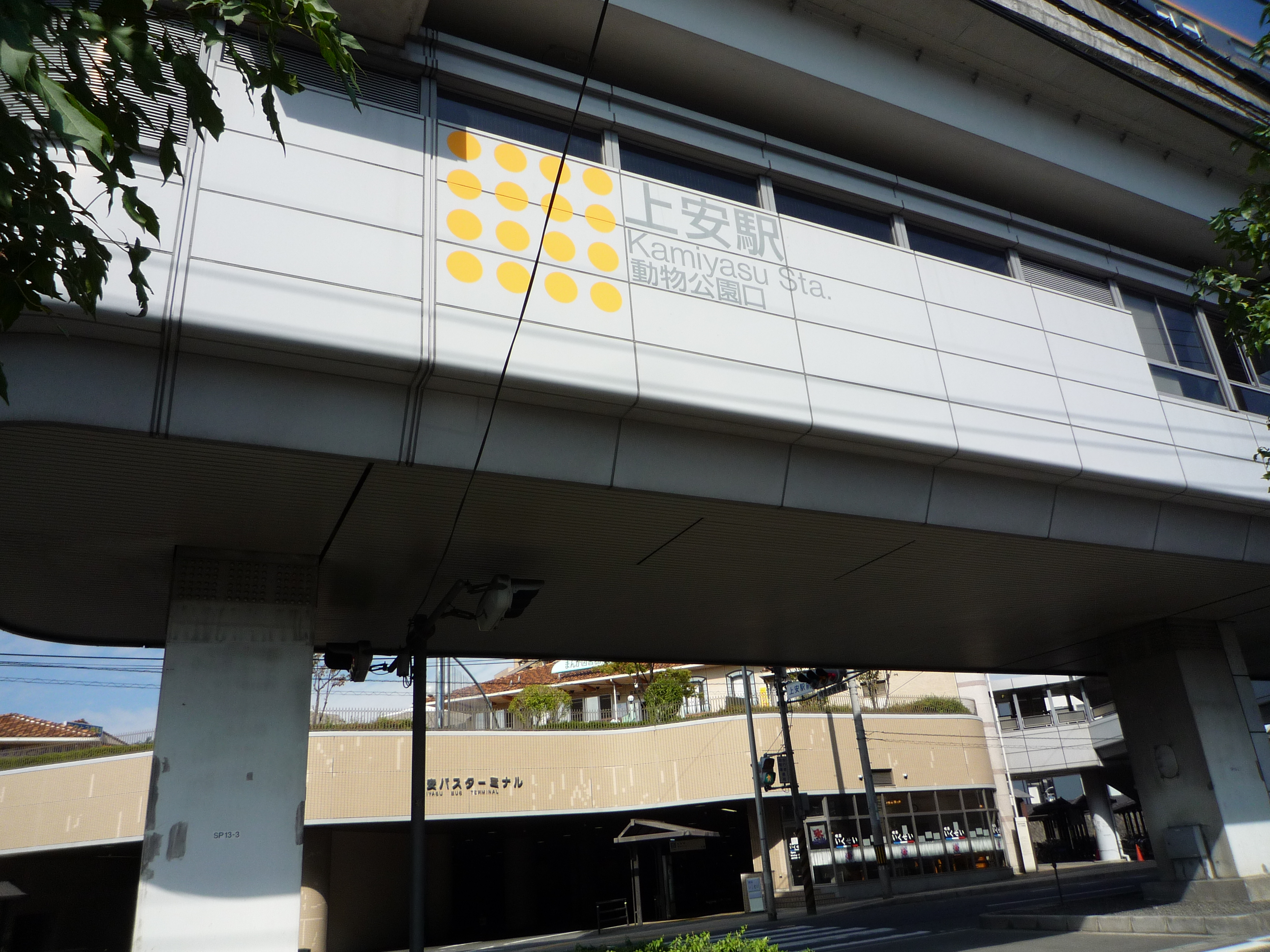
- Kamiyasu Station

General information
- Location: 2-30-10, Kamiyasu, Asaminami-ku, Hiroshima; Japan
- Coordinates: 34°28′33″N 132°26′42″E
- Line: Astram Line
- Platforms: 1 island platform
- Tracks: 2

Construction
- Structure type: elevated station

History
- Opened: 20 August 1994; 32 years ago

Services
Preceding station	Hiroshima Rapid Transit	Following station
Yasuhigashi towards Hondōri	Astram Line	Takatori towards Kōiki-kōen-mae
Location
- Location within Hiroshima Prefecture Location within Japan

Kamiyasu Station is a HRT station on Astram Line, located in 2-30-10, Kamiyasu, Asaminami-ku, Hiroshima.

== Platforms ==
1	█	for Kōiki-kōen-mae
2	█	for Hondōri

== Connections ==
█ Astram Line
●Yasuhigashi — ●Kamiyasu — ●Takatori

== Around station ==
- Bus terminal
- Hiroshima Kamiyasu Post Office
- Hiroshima City Asa Zoological Park
- Hiroshima City Manga Library Asa Reading Room

== History ==
- March 14, 1991: During the Astram Line's construction, 15 people are killed when a girder supporting the line's elevated guideway collapsed.
- August 20, 1994: Station opens.

== See also ==
- Astram Line
- Hiroshima Rapid Transit
