= Fudōin-mae Station =

Railway station in Hiroshima city, Japan

Fudōin-mae Station 不動院前駅
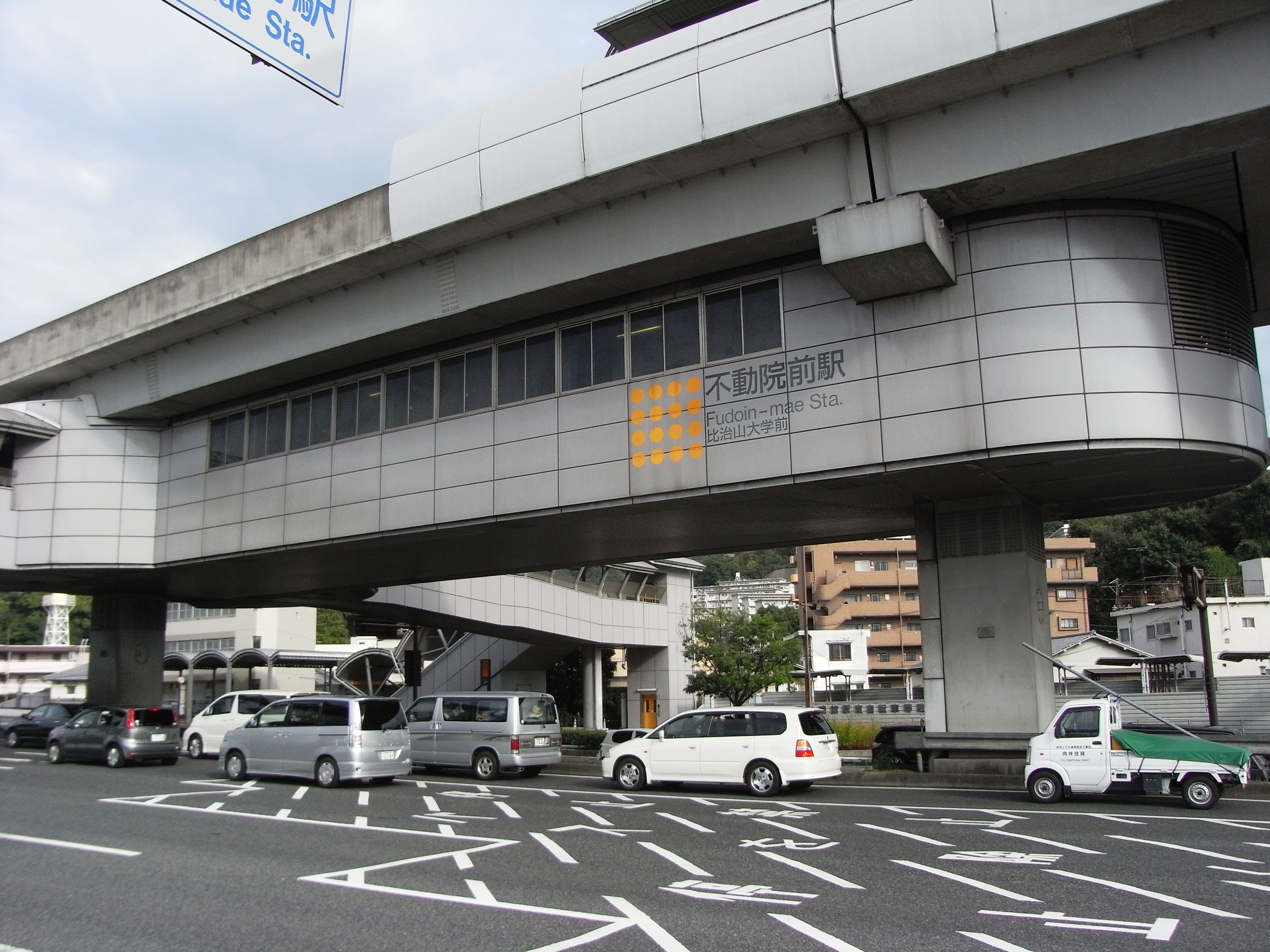
- Fudōin-mae Station

General information
- Location: 3–3–12, Ushita-shinmachi, Naka-ku, Hiroshima; Japan
- Coordinates: 34°25′37″N 132°28′09″E
- Line: Astram Line
- Platforms: 1 island platform
- Tracks: 2

Construction
- Structure type: elevated station

History
- Opened: 20 August 1994; 31 years ago

Services
Preceding station	Hiroshima Rapid Transit	Following station
Ushita towards Hondōri	Astram Line	Gion-shinbashi-kita towards Kōiki-kōen-mae
Location
- Location within Hiroshima Prefecture Location within Japan

Fudōin-mae Station is an HRT station on the Astram Line, located in 3–3–12, Ushita-shinmachi, Naka-ku, Hiroshima.

== Platforms ==
1	█	for Kōiki-kōen-mae
2	█	for Hondōri

== Bus services connections ==
=== Local bus ===
- Hiroden Bus
- Chugoku JR Bus
- Hiroshima Bus
- Geiyo Bus
- Hiroshima Kotsu

== Around station ==
- Fudō-in
- Hijiyama University
- Hiroshima Municipal Hiroshima Commercial High School
- Human Welfare Hiroshima College
- Hiroshima Ushita-shinmachi Post Office

== History ==
- Opened on August 20, 1994.

== See also ==
- Astram Line
- Hiroshima Rapid Transit
