= Ōbara Station =

Railway station in Hiroshima, Hiroshima Prefecture, Japan

Ōbara 大原駅
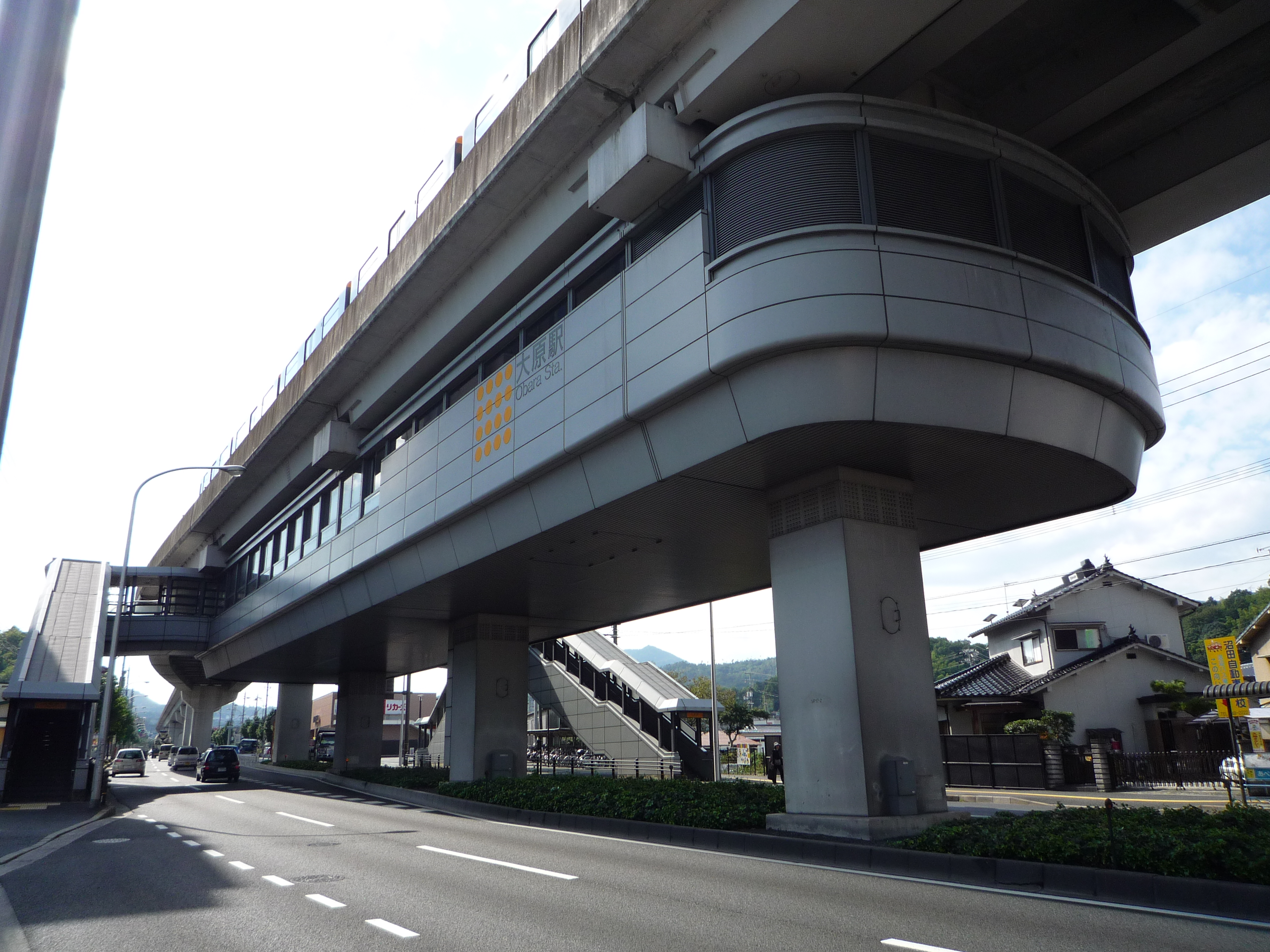
- Ōbara Station

General information
- Location: 5815-11, Tomo, Numata-cho, Asaminami-ku, Hiroshima; Japan
- Coordinates: 34°27′47″N 132°24′46″E
- Line: Astram Line
- Platforms: 1 island platform
- Tracks: 2

Construction
- Structure type: elevated station

History
- Opened: 20 August 1994; 31 years ago

Services
Preceding station	Hiroshima Rapid Transit	Following station
Tomo towards Hondōri	Astram Line	Tomo-chūō towards Kōiki-kōen-mae
Location
- Location within Hiroshima Prefecture Location within Japan

Ōbara Station is a HRT station on Astram Line, located in 5815-11, Tomo, Numata-cho, Asaminami-ku, Hiroshima.

== Platforms ==
1	█	for Kōiki-kōen-mae
2	█	for Hondōri

== Connections ==
█ Astram Line
●Tomo — ●Ōbara — ●Tomo-chūō

== Around station ==
- Tomo Post Office
- Numata Driving School

== History ==
- Opened on August 20, 1994.

== See also ==
- Astram Line
- Hiroshima Rapid Transit
