= Furuichi Station (Hiroshima) =

Railway station in Hiroshima, Japan

Furuichi Station 古市駅
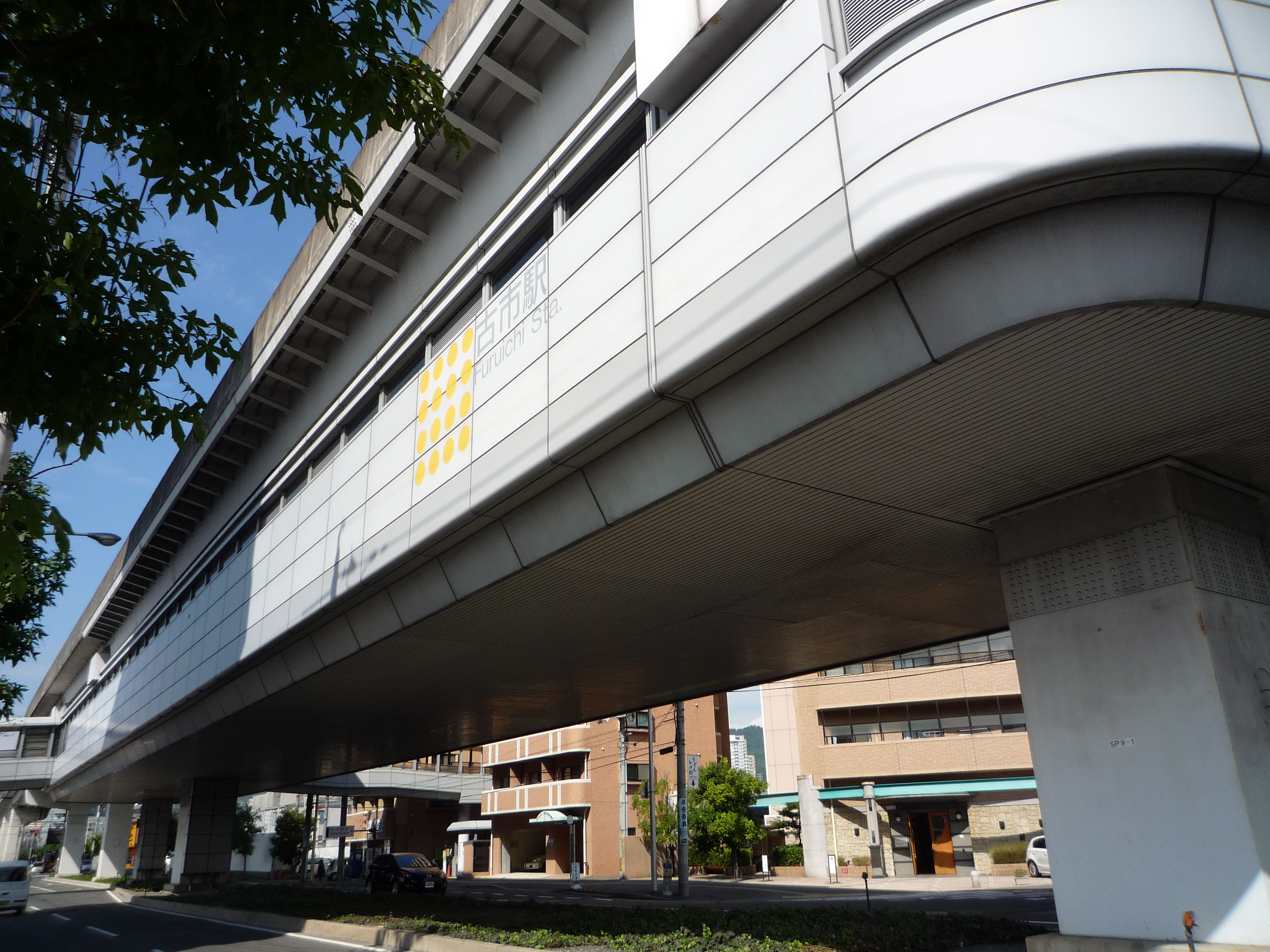

General information
- Location: 1-1-16, Nakasu, Asaminami-ku, Hiroshima; Japan
- Coordinates: 34°27′28″N 132°28′31″E
- Line: Astram Line
- Platforms: 1 island platform
- Tracks: 2

Construction
- Structure type: elevated station

History
- Opened: 20 August 1994; 31 years ago

Services
Preceding station	Hiroshima Rapid Transit	Following station
Nakasuji towards Hondōri	Astram Line	Ōmachi towards Kōiki-kōen-mae
Location
- Location within Hiroshima Prefecture Location within Japan

Furuichi Station is a Hiroshima Rapid Transit station on Astram Line, located in Nakasu, Asaminami-ku, Hiroshima.

== Platforms ==
1	█	for Kōiki-kōen-mae
2	█	for Hondōri

== Connections ==
█ Astram Line
●Nakasuji — ●Furuichi — ●Ōmachi

== Around station ==
- Furuichi Post Office
- Nakasu Bus stop

== History ==
- Opened on August 20, 1994.

== See also ==
- Astram Line
- Hiroshima Rapid Transit
