= Chōrakuji Station =

Railway station in Hiroshima, Japan

Chōrakuji Station 長楽寺駅
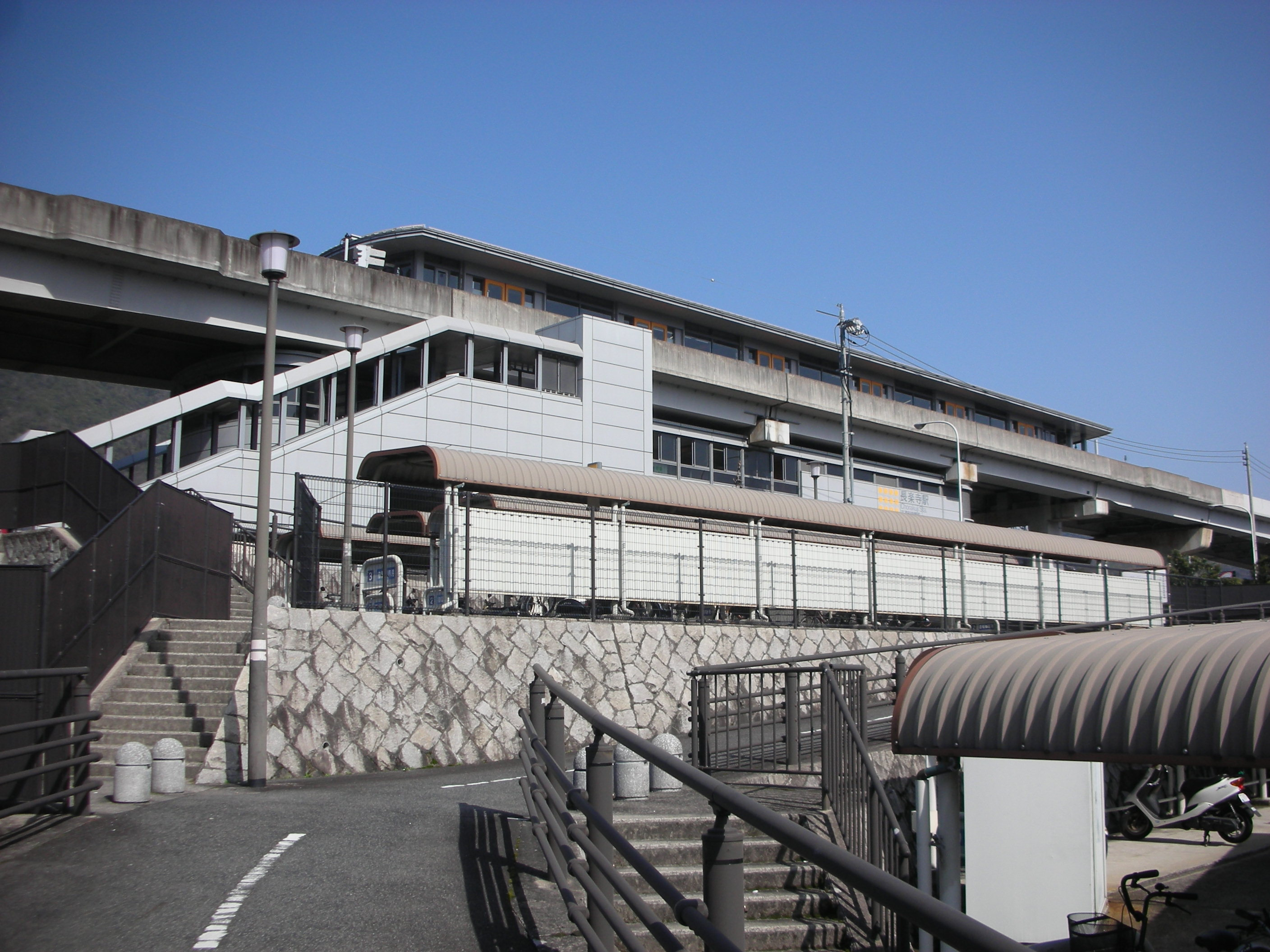
- Chorakuji Station

General information
- Location: 1-28-37, Chorakuji, Asaminami-ku, Hiroshima; Japan
- Coordinates: 34°28′22″N 132°25′52″E
- Line: Astram Line
- Platforms: 1 island platform
- Tracks: 2

Construction
- Structure type: elevated station

History
- Opened: 20 August 1994; 31 years ago

Services
Preceding station	Hiroshima Rapid Transit	Following station
Takatori towards Hondōri	Astram Line	Tomo towards Kōiki-kōen-mae
Location
- Location within Hiroshima Prefecture Location within Japan

Chorakuji Station is a HRT station on Astram Line, located in 1-28-37, Chorakuji, Asaminami-ku, Hiroshima.

== Platforms ==
1	█	for Kōiki-kōen-mae
2	█	for Hondōri

== Connections ==
█ Astram Line
●Takatori — ●Chōrakuji — ●Tomo

== Around station ==
- Hiroshima Rapid Transit Head Office
- Hiroshima City Transportation Museum
- Hiroshima Prefectural Yasunishi High School

== History ==
- Opened on August 20, 1994.

== See also ==
- Astram Line
- Hiroshima Rapid Transit
