= Tomo-chūō Station =

Hiroshima Rapid Transit station

Tomo-chūō 伴中央駅
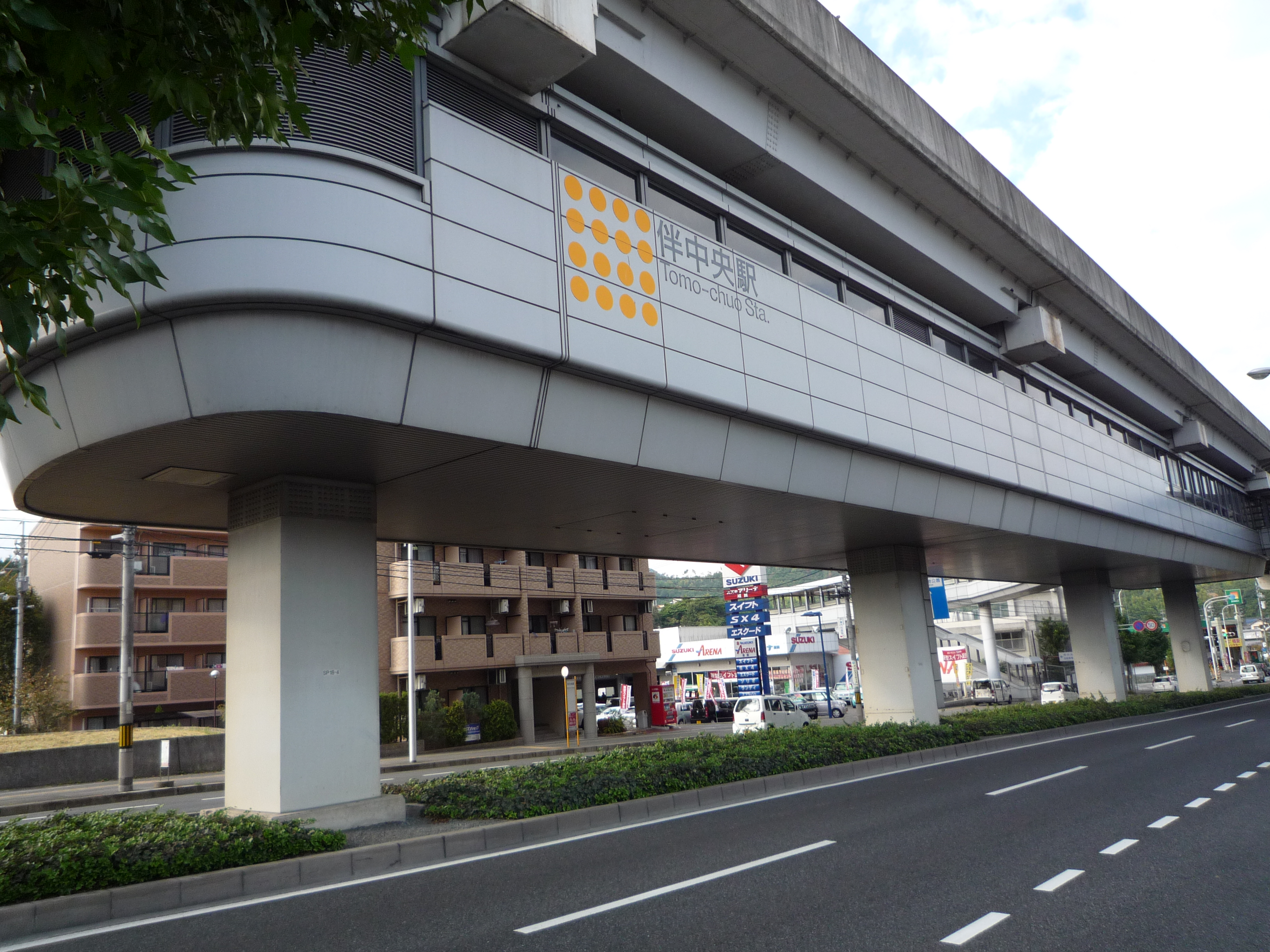
- Tomo-chūō Station

General information
- Location: 4219-11, Tomo, Numata-chō, Asaminami-ku, Hiroshima; Japan
- Coordinates: 34°27′20″N 132°24′18″E
- Line: Astram Line
- Platforms: 1 island platform
- Tracks: 2

Construction
- Structure type: elevated station

History
- Opened: 20 August 1994; 31 years ago

Services
Preceding station	Hiroshima Rapid Transit	Following station
Ōbara towards Hondōri	Astram Line	Ōzuka towards Kōiki-kōen-mae
Location
- Location within Hiroshima Prefecture Location within Japan

Tomo-chūō Station is a HRT station on Astram Line, located in 4219-11, Tomo, Numata-cho, Asaminami-ku, Hiroshima.

== Platforms ==
1	█	for Kōiki-kōen-mae
2	█	for Hondōri

== Connections ==
█ Astram Line
●Ōbara — ●Tomo-chūō — ●Ōzuka

== Around station ==
- Hiroshima Expressway

== History ==
- Opened on August 20, 1994.

== See also ==
- Astram Line
- Hiroshima Rapid Transit
