= Bishamondai Station =

Railway station in Hiroshima, Japan

Bishamondai Station 毘沙門台駅
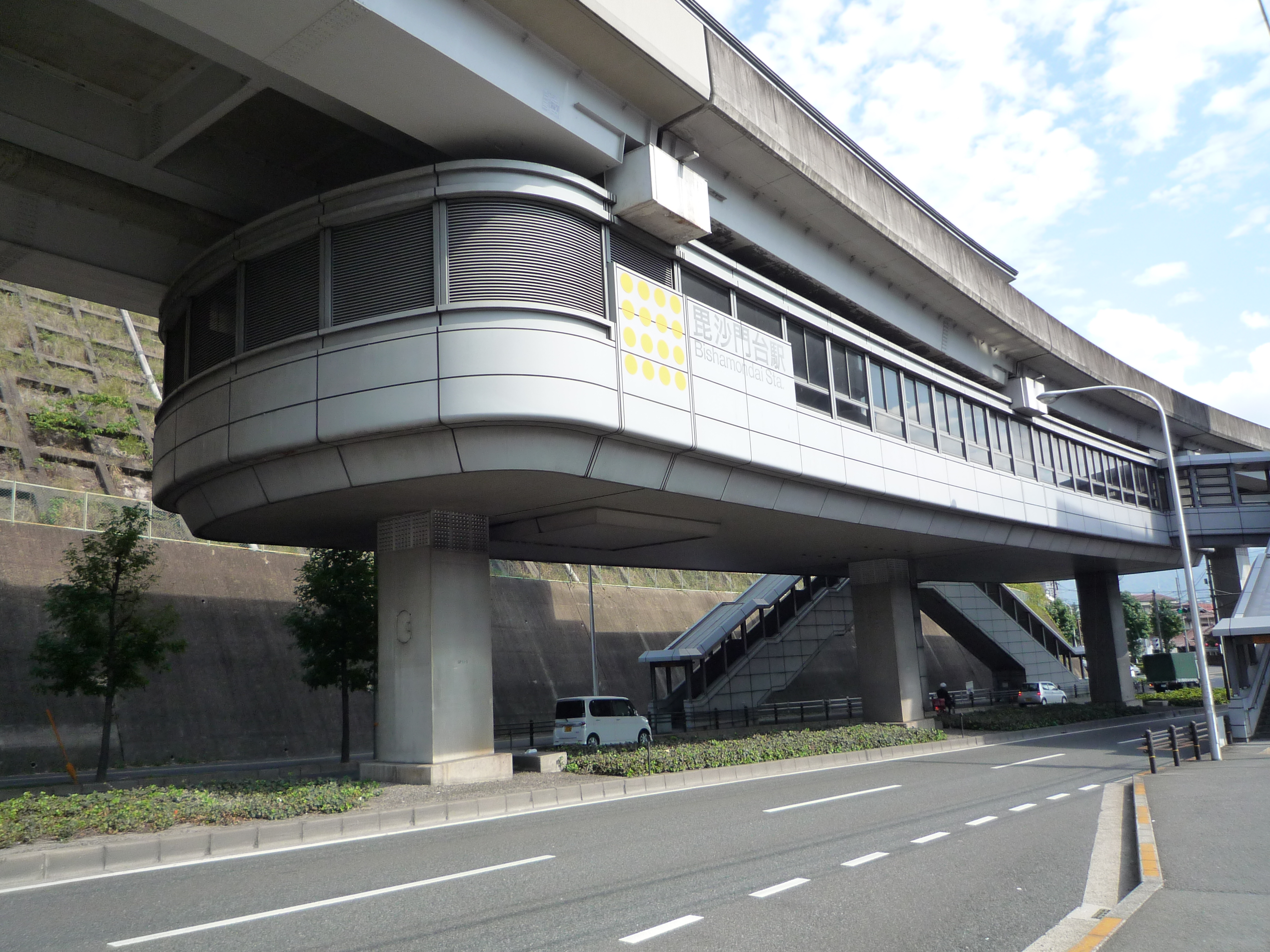

General information
- Location: 1-7-45, Bishamondai, Asaminami-ku, Hiroshima; Japan
- Coordinates: 34°28′09″N 132°27′45″E
- Line: Astram Line
- Platforms: 1 island platform
- Tracks: 2

Construction
- Structure type: elevated station

History
- Opened: 20 August 1994; 31 years ago

Services
Preceding station	Hiroshima Rapid Transit	Following station
Ōmachi towards Hondōri	Astram Line	Yasuhigashi towards Kōiki-kōen-mae
Location
- Location within Hiroshima Prefecture Location within Japan

Bishamondai Station is a HRT station on Astram Line, located in 1-7-45, Bishamondai, Asaminami-ku, Hiroshima.

== Platforms ==
1	█	for Kōiki-kōen-mae
2	█	for Hondōri

== Connections ==
█ Astram Line
●Ōmachi — ●Bishamondai — ●Yasuhigashi

== Around station ==
- Hiroshima City Asa Junior High School
- Hiroshima Municipal Yasuhigashi Elementary School
- Bishamondai Post office
- Hiroshima Prefectural Yasufuruichi Senior High School
- Hiroshima Municipal Bishamondai Elementary School
- Bishamondai Park
- Bishamonten
- Midorii Purification Plant

== History ==
- Opened on August 20, 1994.

== See also ==
- Astram Line
- Hiroshima Rapid Transit
