= Nishihara Station =

Railway station in Hiroshima, Japan

Nishihara 西原駅
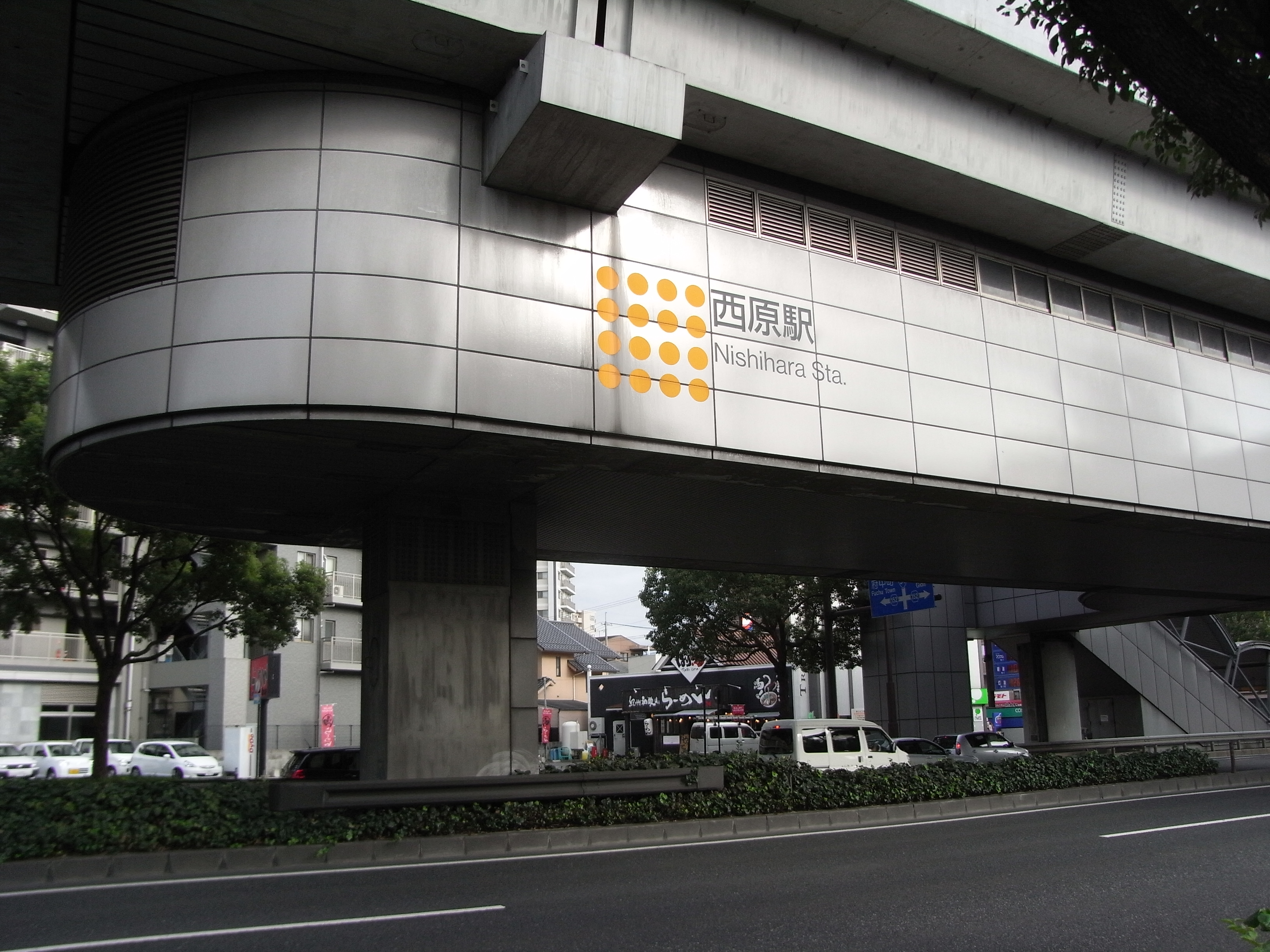
- Nishiharaa Station

General information
- Location: 8-34-1, Nishihara, Asaminami-ku, Hiroshima; Japan
- Coordinates: 34°26′35″N 132°28′29″E
- Line: Astram Line
- Platforms: 1 island platform
- Tracks: 2

Construction
- Structure type: elevated station

History
- Opened: 20 August 1994; 32 years ago

Services
Preceding station	Hiroshima Rapid Transit	Following station
Gion-shinbashi-kita towards Hondōri	Astram Line	Nakasuji towards Kōiki-kōen-mae
Location
- Location within Hiroshima Prefecture Location within Japan

Nishihara Station is a HRT station on the Astram Line, located in 8-34-1, Nishihara, Asaminami-ku, Hiroshima.

== Platforms ==
1	█	for Kōiki-kōen-mae
2	█	for Hondōri

== Connections ==
█ Astram Line
●Gion-shinbashi-kita — ●Nishihara — ●Nakasuji

== Around station ==
- Japan National Route 54 (Gion Shindo)
- Gion Hara Post Office
- Asaminami Post Office
- Hiroshima Municipal Hara Elementary School

== History ==
- Opened on August 20, 1994.

== See also ==
- Astram Line
- Hiroshima Rapid Transit
