= Gion-shinbashi-kita Station =

Railway station in Hiroshima, Japan

Gion-shinbashi-kita Station 祇園新橋北駅
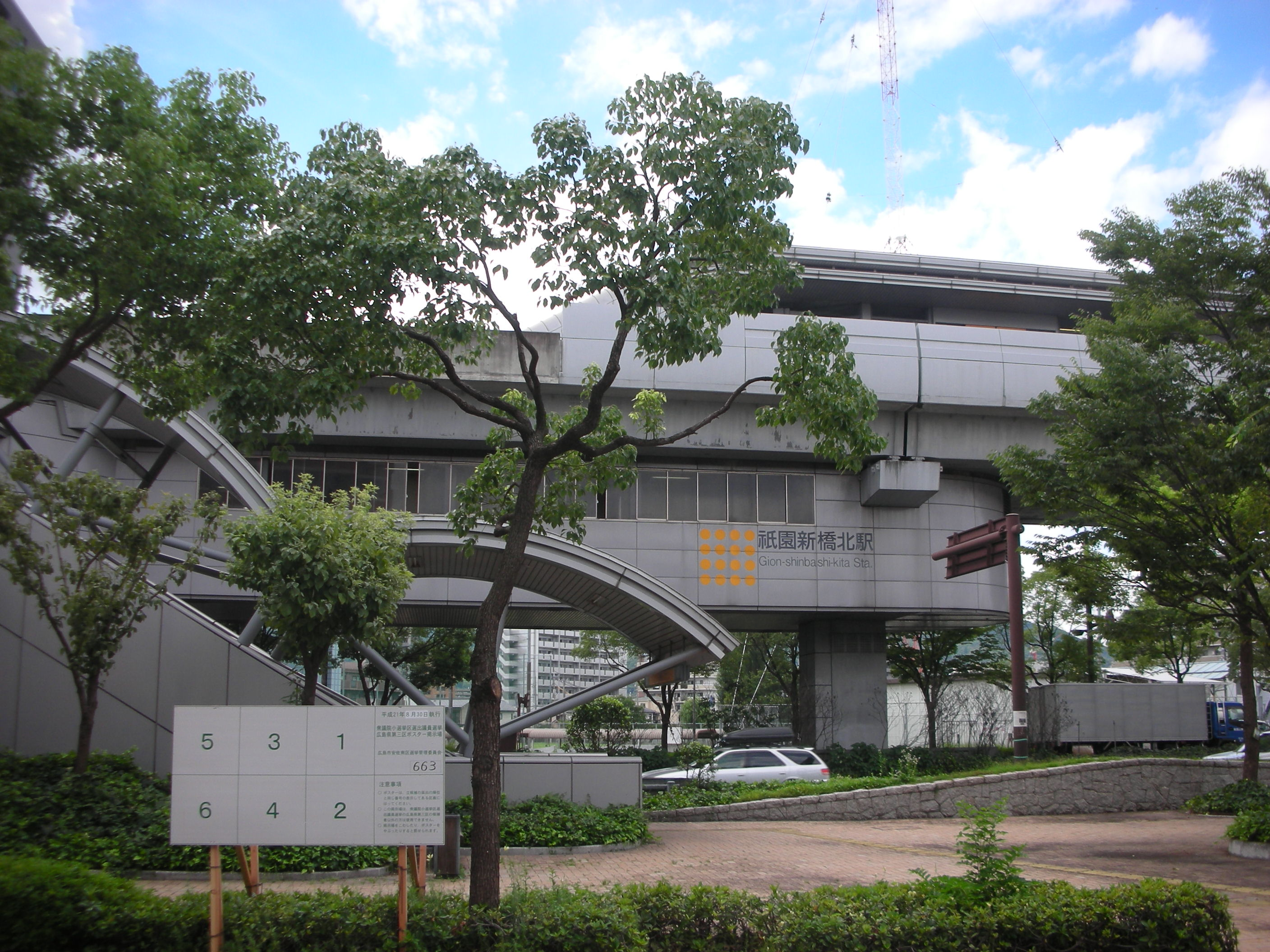
- Gion-shinbashi-kita Station

General information
- Location: 4-43-28, Nishihara, Asaminami-ku, Hiroshima; Japan
- Coordinates: 34°26′06″N 132°28′15″E
- Line: Astram Line
- Platforms: 1 island platform
- Tracks: 2

Construction
- Structure type: elevated station

History
- Opened: 20 August 1994; 31 years ago

Services
Preceding station	Hiroshima Rapid Transit	Following station
Fudōin-mae towards Hondōri	Astram Line	Nishihara towards Kōiki-kōen-mae
Location
- Location within Hiroshima Prefecture Location within Japan

== Platforms ==
1	█	for Kōiki-kōen-mae
2	█	for Hondōri

== Around station ==
- Japan National Route 54 (Gion Shindo)
- Gion Shinbashi
- Ōta River
- NHK Hiroshima Radio Station

== History ==
- Opened on August 20, 1994.

== See also ==
- Astram Line
- Hiroshima Rapid Transit
