= Takatori Station =

Takatori Station is the name of two train stations in Japan.

- Takatori Station (Hiroshima) - (高取駅) in Hiroshima, Hiroshima Prefecture
- Takatori Station (Hyōgo) - (鷹取駅) in Kobe, Hyogo Prefecture
