= Hiroshima City Transportation Museum =

Transport museum in Hiroshima, Japan

Coordinates: 34.470861°N 132.428641°E

- 広島市交通科学館
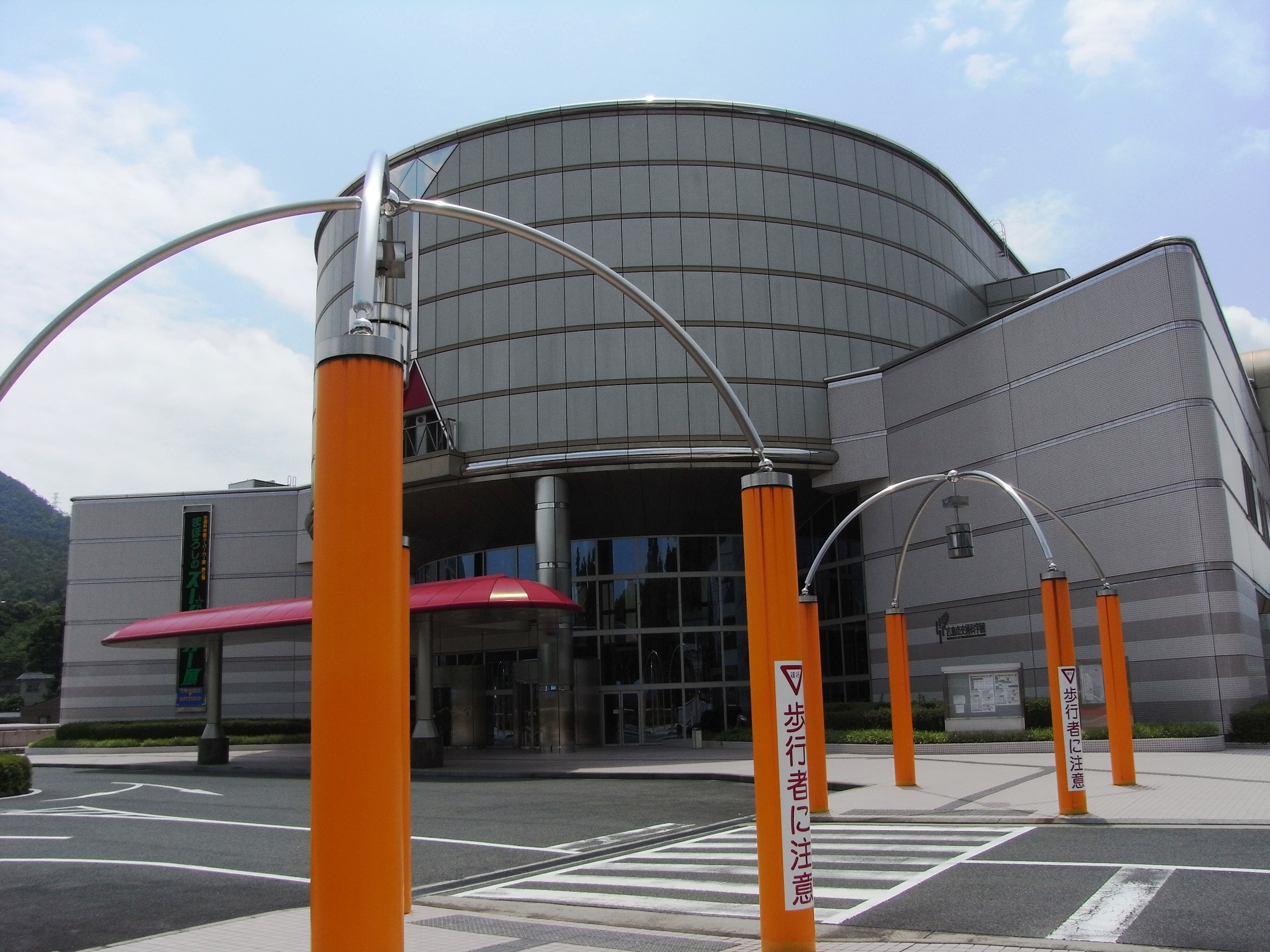
- Established: 1995
- Location: 12-2, Chorakuji 2-chome, Asaminami-ku, Hiroshima
- Website: www.vehicle.city.hiroshima.jp

The Hiroshima City Transportation Museum (広島市交通科学館, Hiroshima-shi Kōtsū Kagakukan) is a transport museum in Hiroshima, Japan, opened in March 1995.

== Museum ==
=== Entrance and open-air square ===
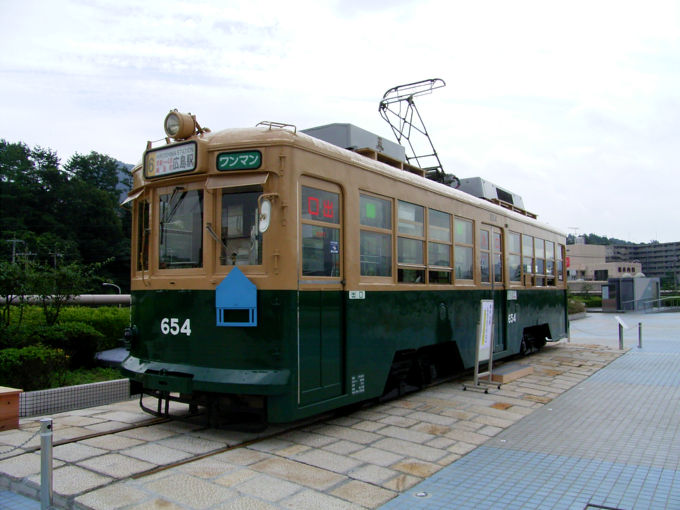
A-bombed street car

- Restaurant
- Museum shop
- Multipurpose hall
- Library
- Main Craft Room
- The Vehicle
- Rest and Information Corner
- Battery Cart Corner
- Windmills
- Tram (Type 650, the "A-Bomb tram")

=== Collection floor ===
- Transportation Vehicles of the World
- True Scale Vehicles
- Historical Scenes
- City Runner
- Dr.Vehicle Information
- Collections of Memorabilia
- Street Cars
- Hyper Book
- Special Exhibition Room

=== Panoramic floor ===
- View Capsule
- Vehicle Voice
- Vehicle City
- Panoramic Deck
- City Guide
- Operation Control
- Dr.Vehicle Information

== Access ==
- Astram Chōrakuji Station
