= Takatori Station (Hiroshima) =

Railway station in Hiroshima, Japan

Takatori 高取駅
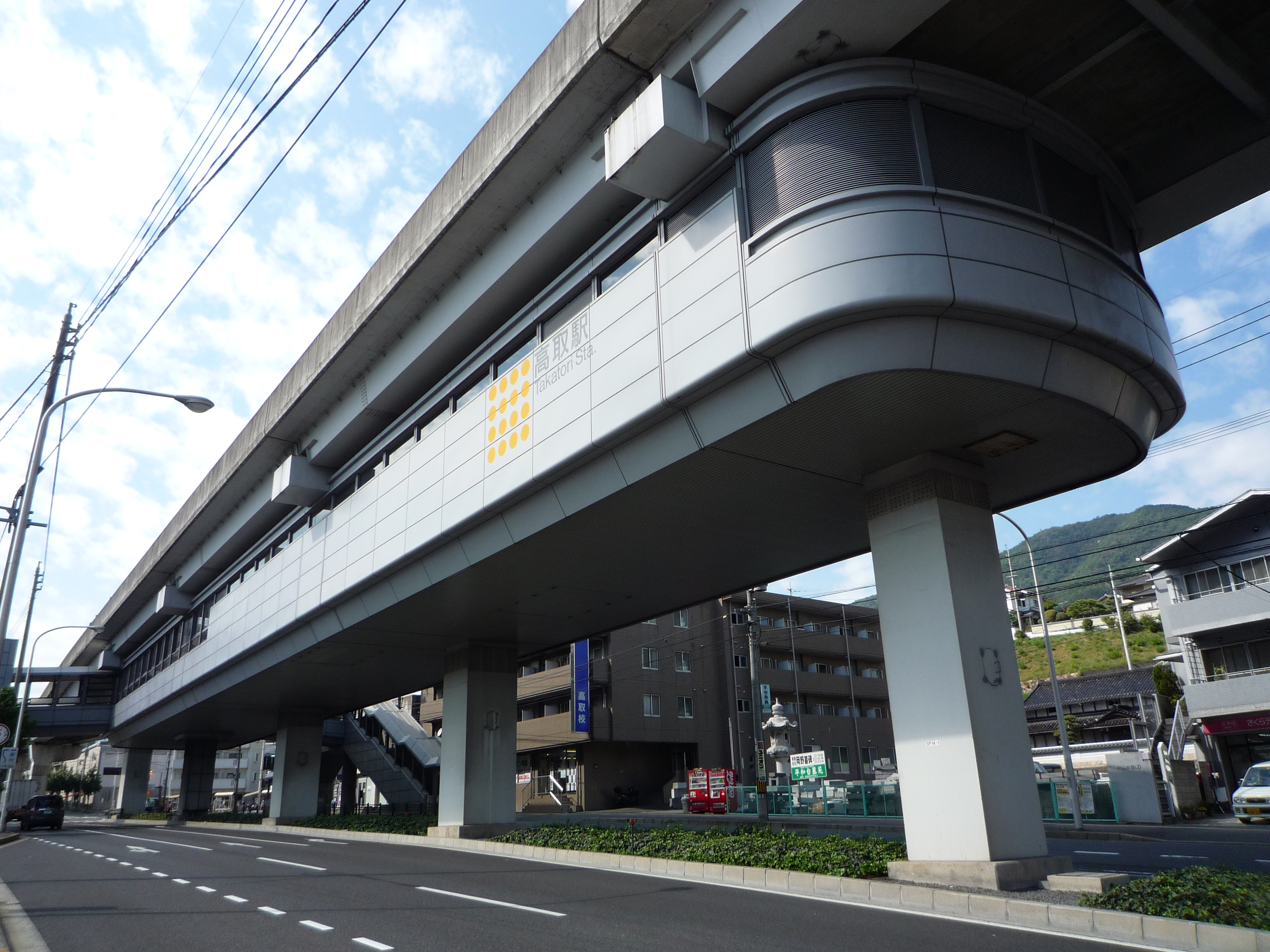
- Takatori Station

General information
- Location: 1-4-28, Takatori-kita, Asaminami-ku, Hiroshima; Japan
- Coordinates: 34°28′31″N 132°26′18″E
- Line: Astram Line
- Platforms: 1 island platform
- Tracks: 2

Construction
- Structure type: elevated station

History
- Opened: 20 August 1994; 31 years ago

Services
Preceding station	Hiroshima Rapid Transit	Following station
Kamiyasu towards Hondōri	Astram Line	Chōrakuji towards Kōiki-kōen-mae
Location
- Location within Hiroshima Prefecture Location within Japan

Takatori Station is a HRT station on Astram Line, located in 1-4-28, Takatori-kita, Asaminami-ku, Hiroshima.

== Platforms ==
1	█	for Kōiki-kōen-mae
2	█	for Hondōri

== Connections ==
█ Astram Line
●Kamiyasu — ●Takatori — ●Chōrakuji

== History ==
- Opened on August 20, 1994
