= Ōzuka Station =

Railway station in Hiroshima, Japan

Ōzuka 大塚駅
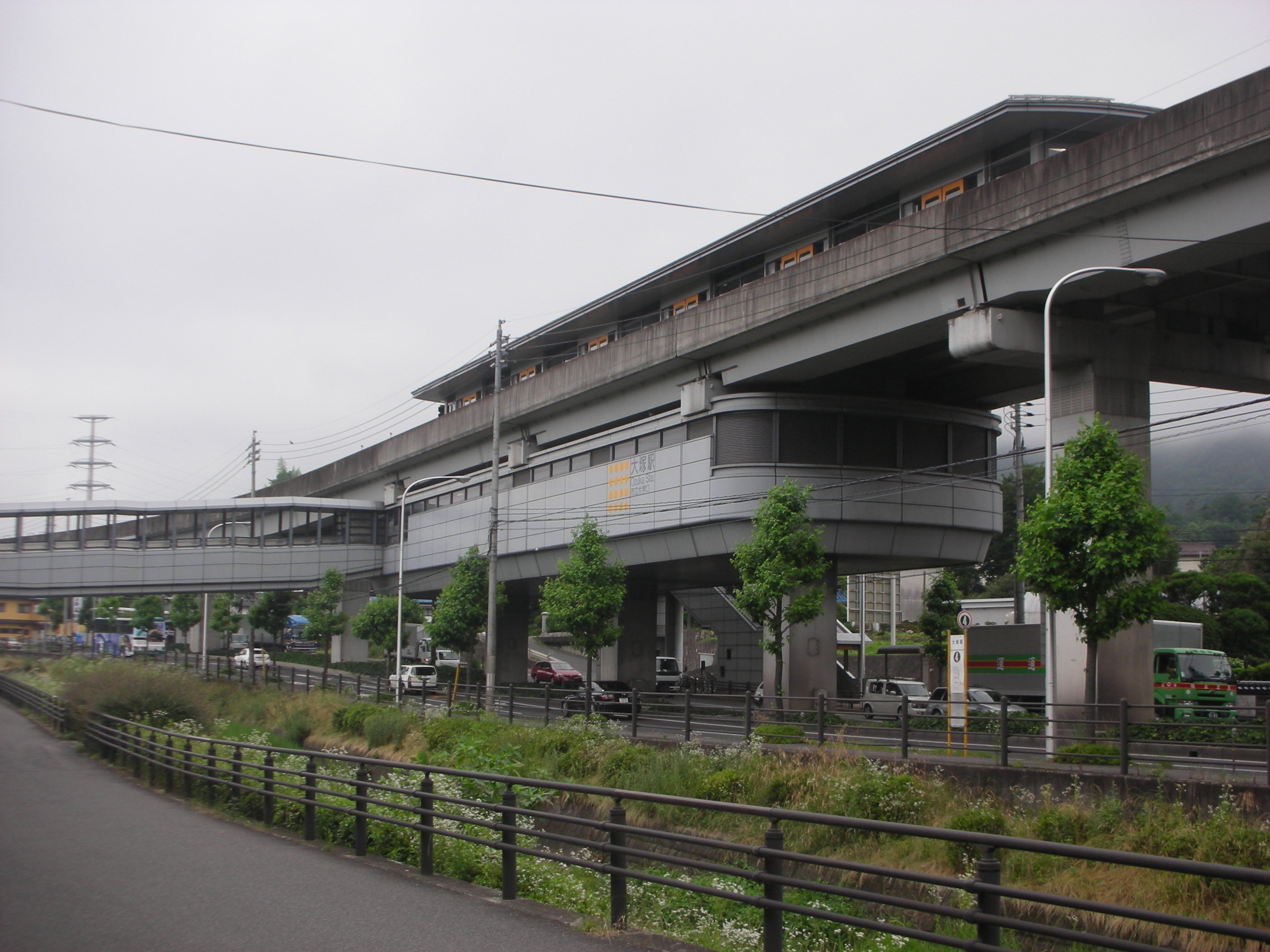
- Ōzuka Station

General information
- Location: 608-3, Ozuka, Numata-cho, Asaminami-ku, Hiroshima; Japan
- Coordinates: 34°26′29″N 132°24′10″E
- Line: Astram Line
- Platforms: 1 island platform
- Tracks: 2

Construction
- Structure type: elevated station

History
- Opened: 20 August 1994; 32 years ago

Passengers
- FY2024: 1,684 (daily)

Services
Preceding station	Hiroshima Rapid Transit	Following station
Tomo-chūō towards Hondōri	Astram Line	Kōiki-kōen-mae Terminus
Location
- Location within Hiroshima Prefecture Location within Japan

Ōzuka Station (大塚駅, Ōzuka-eki) is an HRT station on Astram Line, located in 608-3, Ozuka, Numata-cho, Asaminami-ku, Hiroshima, Japan.

== Platforms ==
1	█	for Kōiki-kōen-mae
2	█	for Hondōri

== Connections ==
█ Astram Line
●Tomo-chūō — ●Ōzuka — ●Kōiki-kōen-mae

== Bus services connections ==
=== Local bus ===
- Hiroden Bus
- Chugoku JR Bus
- Hiroshima Bus
- Geiyo Bus
- Hiroshima Kotsu

== Around station ==
- Ozuka Post Office
- Hiroshima City University
- Hiroshima Kouiki Kouen

== History ==
- Opened on August 20, 1994.

== See also ==
- Astram Line
- Hiroshima Rapid Transit
