= 大塚駅 =

大塚駅 may refer to:

- Ōtsuka Station
- Ōzuka Station
