= Hiroshima Big Arch =

Multi-purpose stadium in Hiroshima, Japan

- Hot Staff Field Hiroshima
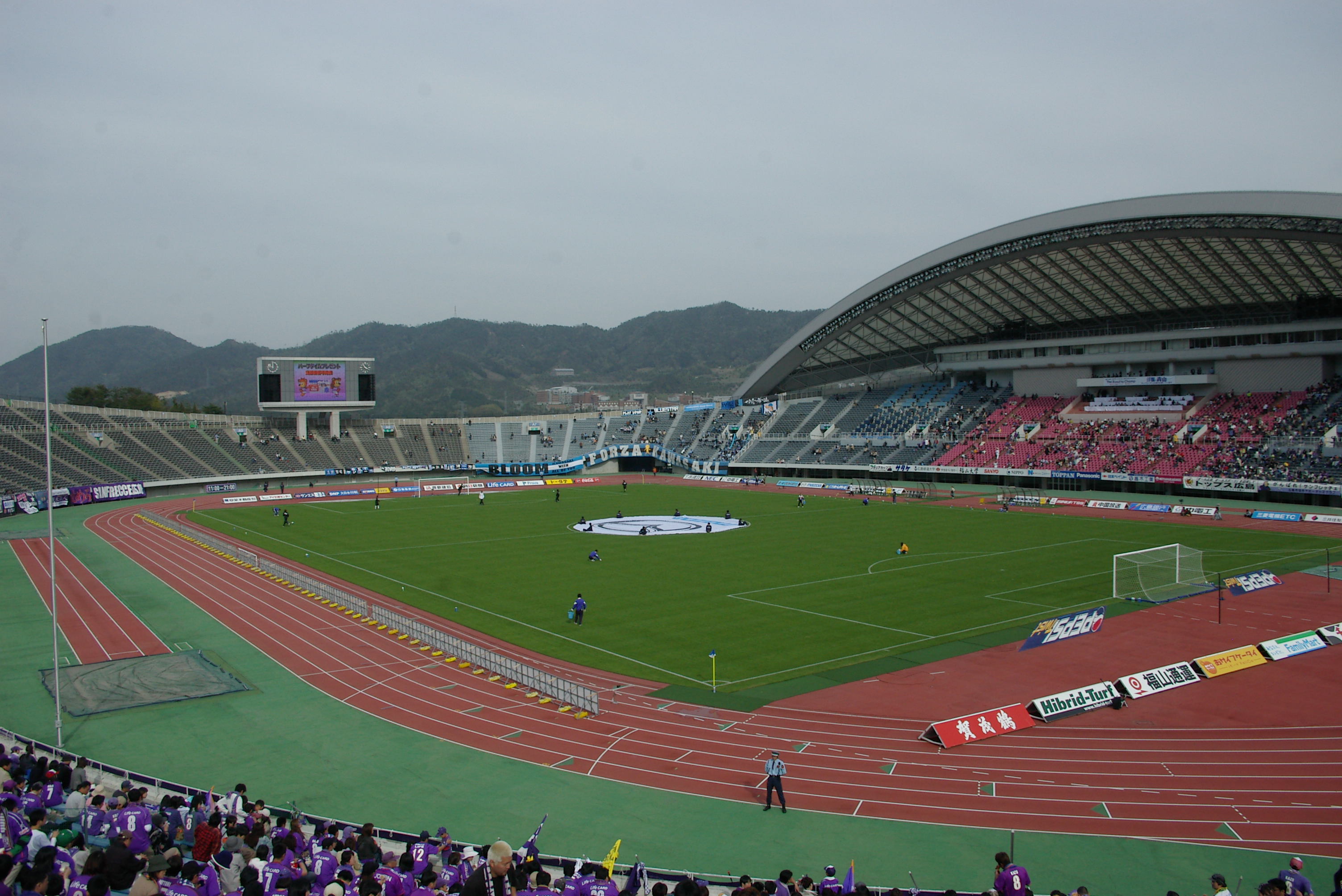
- Hot Staff Field Hiroshima in April 2005
- Interactive map of Hiroshima Big Arch
- Former names: Hiroshima Park Stadium (1992–2013); Edion Stadium Hiroshima (2013–2024)
- Location: Hiroshima, Japan
- Coordinates: 34°26′26.8″N 132°23′39.3″E
- Owner: Hiroshima City
- Operator: Hiroshima City Sports Association
- Capacity: 50,000
- Surface: Grass
- Field size: 107 x 73.3 m
- Public transit: Hiroshima Rapid Transit: Astram Line at Koiki-koen-mae

Construction
- Opened: September 1992

Tenant
- Sanfrecce Hiroshima (1992–2023)

The Hiroshima Big Arch (広島ビッグアーチ, Hiroshima Biggu Āchi), known under current sponsorship as Hot Staff Field Hiroshima (ホットスタッフフィールド広島, Hotto Sutaffu Fīrudo Hiroshima), is a multi-purpose stadium in Hiroshima, Japan. It used mostly for association football matches and also for other sports. The venue was the home of J.League club Sanfrecce Hiroshima through the 2023 season, after which the club moved to the newly built Edion Peace Wing Hiroshima stadium. It has a capacity of 50,000. It is an all-seater.

== History ==
Hiroshima Big Arch opened in 1992, as the venue of 1992 AFC Asian Cup. The host nation Japan won the Asian Cup title for the first time, after defeating the defending champion Saudi Arabia 1–0 in the final at this stadium.

The stadium hosted the 1994 Asian Games.

== Access ==
The stadium is accessible via train services, with the Kōiki-kōen-mae Station on the Astram Line located only 5 minutes' walk from the stadium.

Preceded by Al-Ahly Stadium (Qatar) Doha	AFC Asian Cup; Final Venue; 1992	Succeeded by Jeque Zayed Stadium (United Arab Emirates) Abu Dhabi
