= Ōmachi Station (Hiroshima) =

Railway station in Hiroshima, Japan

Ōmachi Station 大町駅
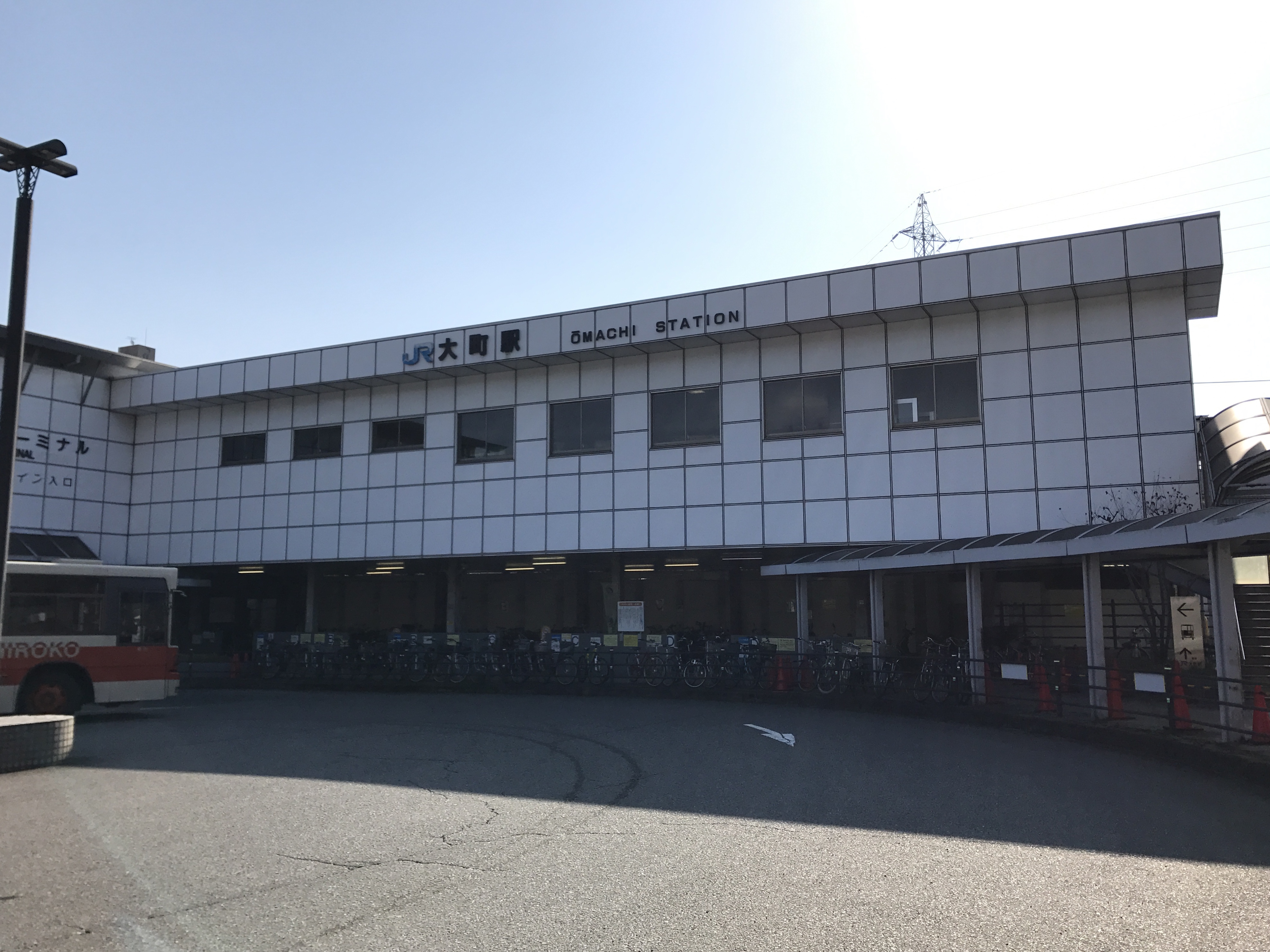
- JR Ōmachi Station building in March 2017

General information
- Location: 2-chome-9, Ōmachihigashi Asaminami, Hiroshima, Hiroshima; Japan
- Coordinates: 34°27′41″N 132°28′14″E
- Operator: JR West; Hiroshima Rapid Transit

History
- Opened: 20 August 1994
Location
- Location within Hiroshima Prefecture Location within Japan

Ōmachi Station (大町駅, Ōmachi-eki) is a station operated by the West Japan Railway Company (JR West) and Hiroshima Rapid Transit. It is located in Ōmachi-higashi, Asaminami-ku, Hiroshima, Hiroshima Prefecture, Japan. The Kabe Line and the Astram Line stop at this station, though they are situated in separate station buildings. An overpass connects the two buildings together.

== Lines ==
Ōmachi Station is served by the following lines:

- JR West

- B Kabe Line

- Hiroshima Rapid Transit

- Astram Line

== Station layout ==
=== Kabe Line ===
B 08 Ōmachi Station 大町駅
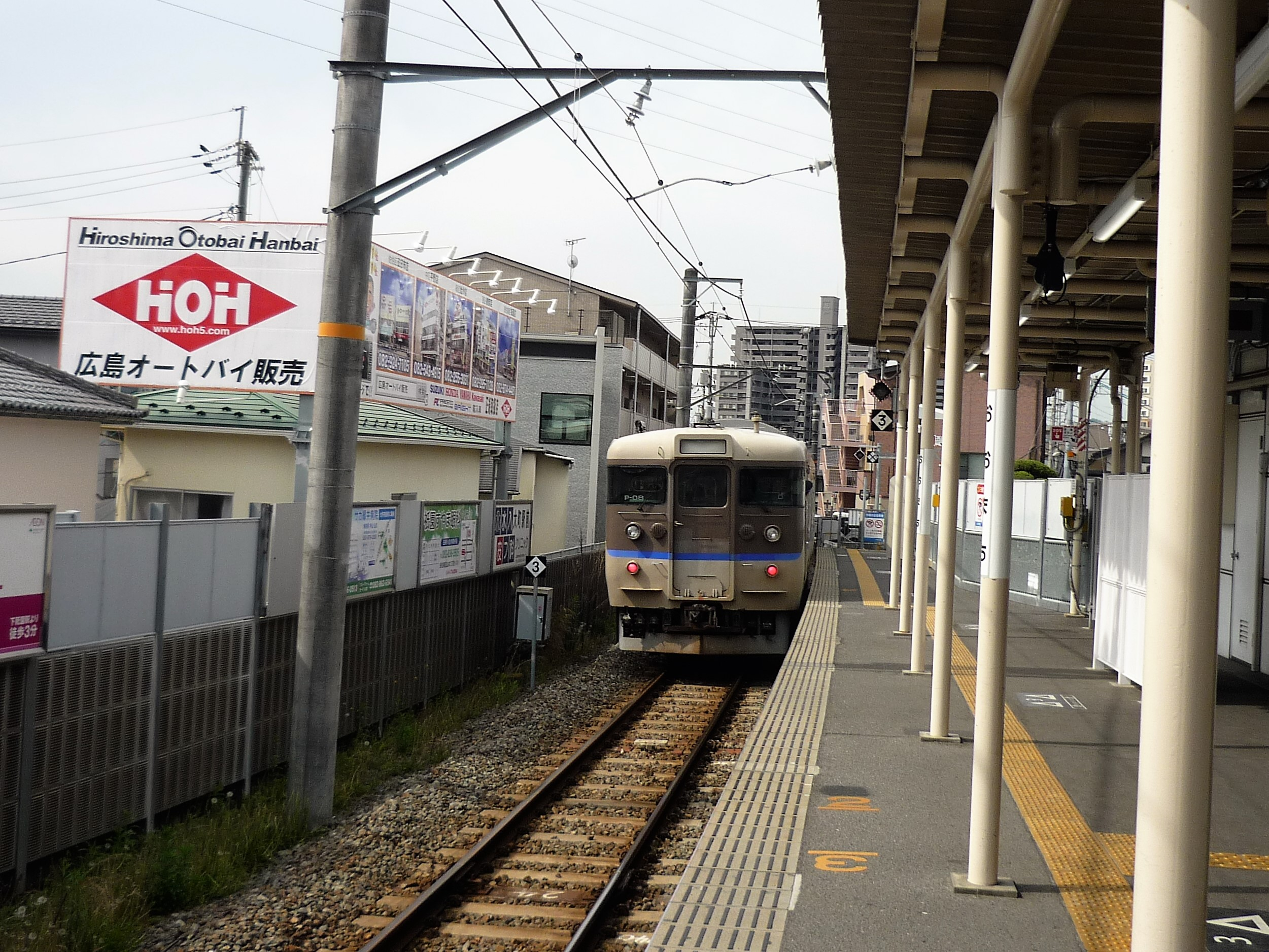
- Kabe Line platform in May 2017

General information
- Location: 2-9-28 Omachihigashi, Asaminami Ward, Hiroshima City; Hiroshima Prefecture
- Line: B Kabe Line
- Platforms: 1 side platform
- Tracks: 1

Other information
- Website: Official website

Passengers
- FY2015: 4,465 daily

Services
Preceding station	JR West	Following station
Midorii B 09 towards Aki-Kameyama	Kabe Line	Furuichibashi B 07 towards Hiroshima
Location

The Kabe Line station features one side platform serving one bidirectional track. The station did not exist during the line's opening; it was infilled during construction of the Astram Line in order to allow transfers between the two. The station is on ground level, however as the track is on an embankment, passengers must climb stairs in order to reach the platform. A ticket office is available at this station. Unlike most stations on the Kabe Line, this station has ticket gates.

==== Platforms ====
1	B Kabe Line	for Hiroshima, Aki-Kameyama

=== Astram Line ===
Ōmachi 大町駅
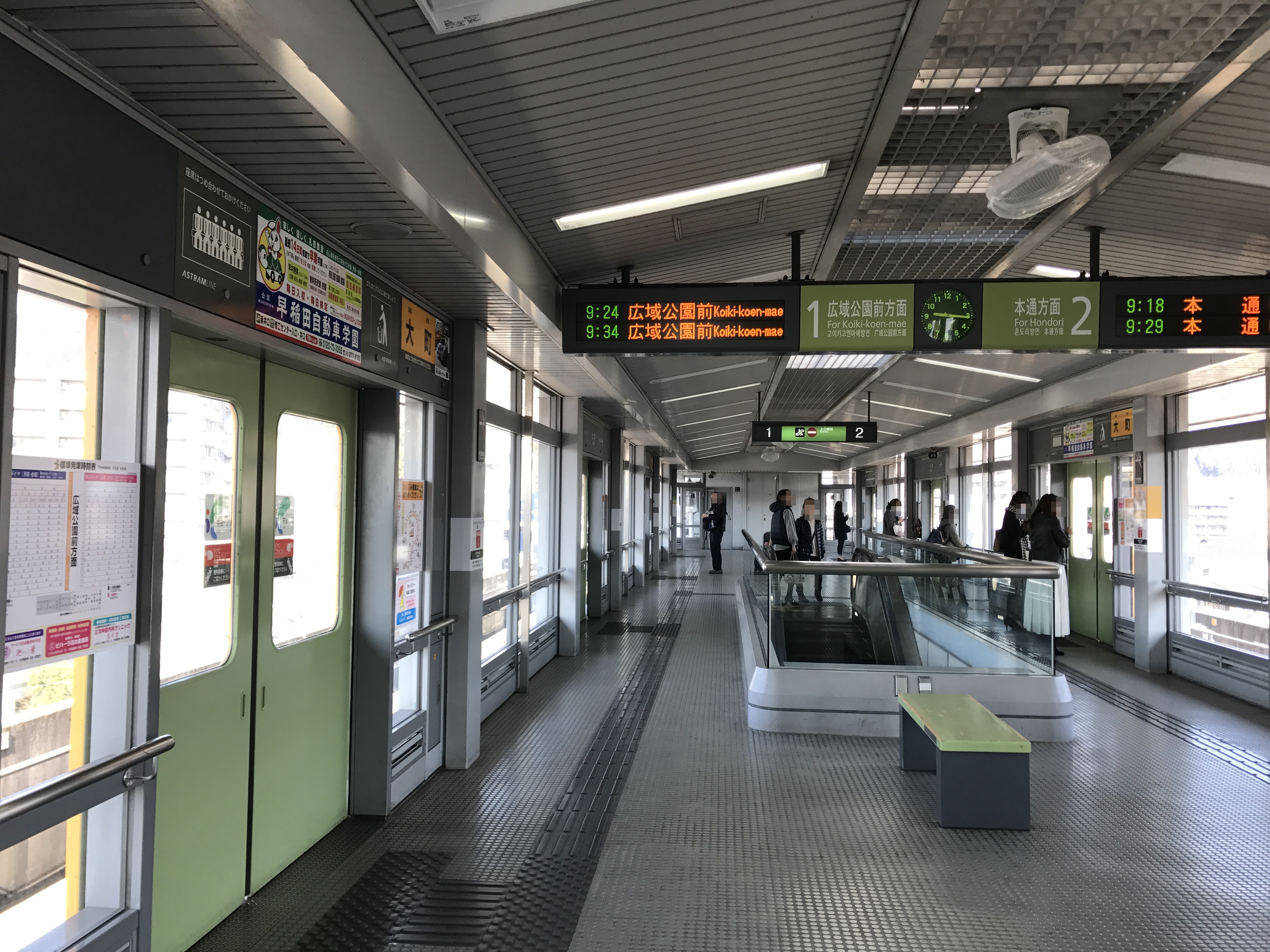
- Astram Line platform on March 2017

General information
- Line: Astram Line
- Platforms: 1 island platform
- Tracks: 2

Construction
- Structure type: Elevated station

Passengers
- FY2015: 4,803 daily

Services
Preceding station	Hiroshima Rapid Transit	Following station
Furuichi towards Hondōri	Astram Line	Bishamondai towards Kōiki-kōen-mae
Location

The Astram Line station building features one elevated island platform serving two tracks. A headshunt is located north-west of the station, and some trains in the morning use this to short turn at this station. The station has a color designation of yellowish-green.

==== Platforms ====
1	■ Astram Line	for Kōiki-kōen-mae
2	■ Astram Line	for Hondōri

== History ==
The station was opened during the Astram Line opening on 20 August 1994. The Kabe Line station opened at the same time, in order to allow transfers between the two lines.

== Surrounding area ==
- Sanyō Expressway Interchange
- Japan National Route 54
- Ōmachi Bus Terminal
- Hiroshima Ōmachi Post Office
