= Yasuda Women's University =

Coordinates: 34°28′50″N 132°27′07″E

- Established: 1915
- Location: Hiroshima

Yasuda Women's University (安田女子大学, Yasuda joshi daigaku) is a private women's college in Asaminami, Hiroshima, Japan. The predecessor of the school was established by Riyou Yasuda and others in 1915 and was chartered as a junior women's college in 1955. The graduate school was established in 1994 and as of 2017 awards degrees in Japanese and English language and literature, education, clinical psychology, health science, pharmaceutical science, and nursing.
