= Astram Line =

Rubber-tired transit system operated by Hiroshima Rapid Transit

Astram Line (Hiroshima Rapid Transit Line 1)

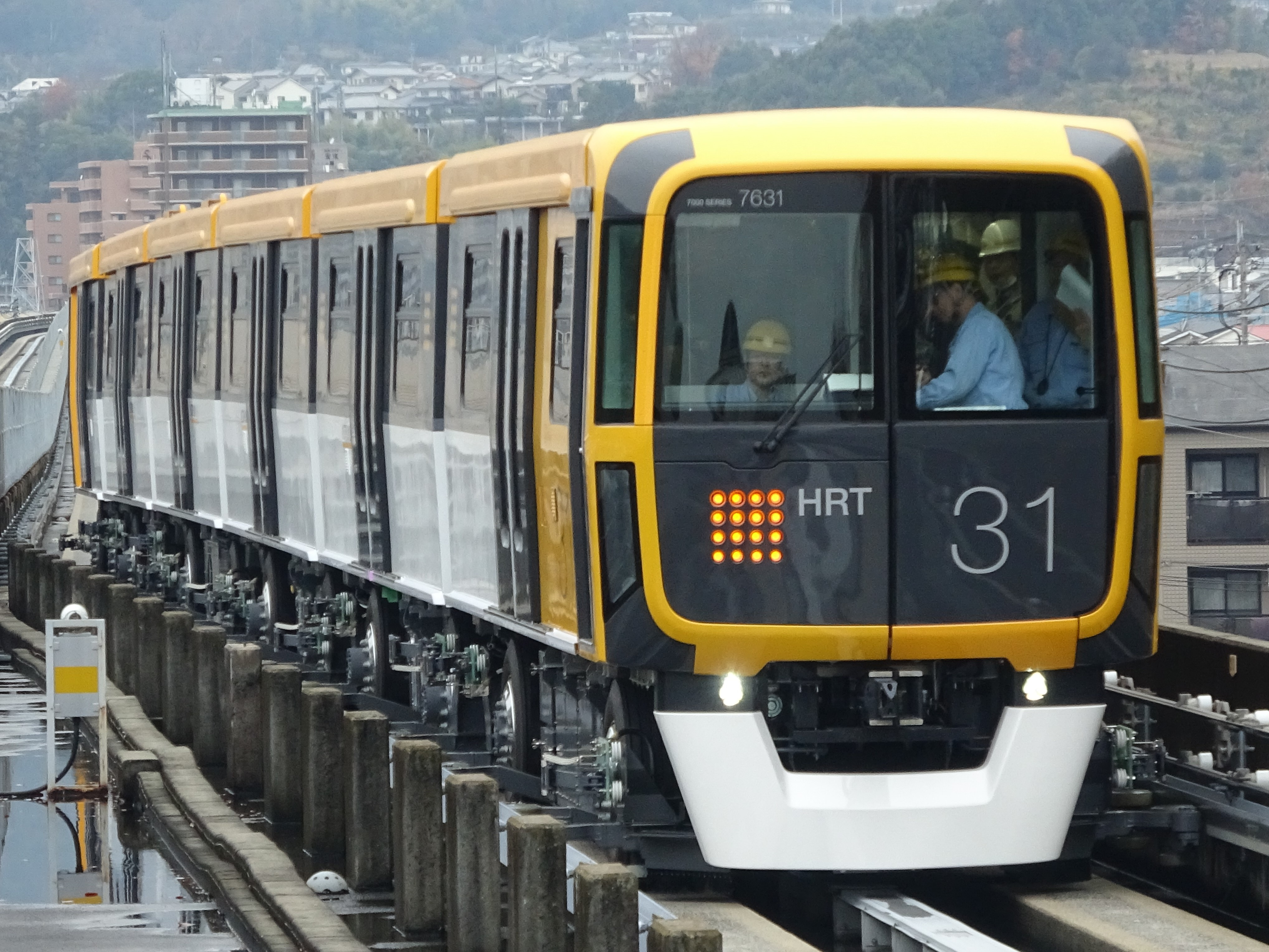
- A 7000 series train on the Astram Line in December 2019

Overview
- Owner: Hiroshima Rapid Transit
- Locale: Hiroshima
- Termini: Hondōri; Kōiki-kōen-mae
- Stations: 22

Service
- Type: Rubber-tyred metro
- Services: 1
- Depot: Chōrakuji

History
- Opened: 20 August 1994; 32 years ago

Technical
- Line length: 18.4 km (11.4 mi)
- Number of tracks: 2
- Electrification: Conductor rail, 750 V DC
Route map
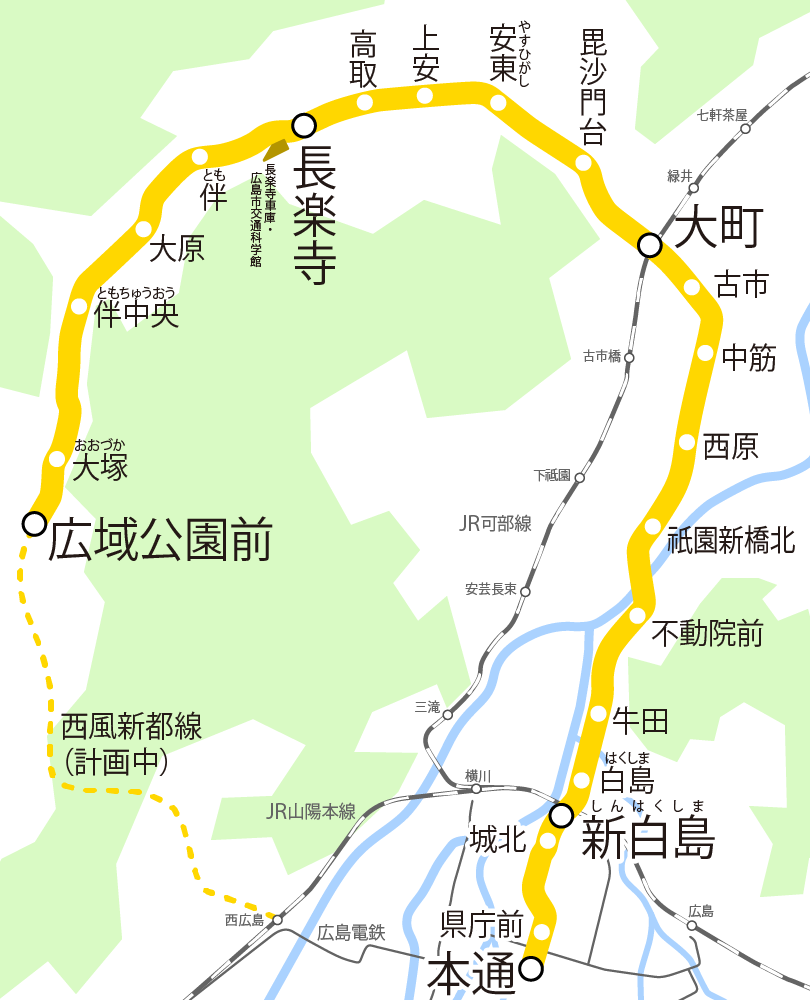

Hiroshima New Transit Line 1 (Japanese: 広島新交通1号線, Hepburn: Hiroshima Shin Kōtsū 1-gō-sen), also known as the Astram Line (アストラムライン, Asutoramurain), is a manually operated, rubber-tyred people mover operated by Hiroshima Rapid Transit in Hiroshima, Japan. Astram opened on August 20, 1994, for the 1994 Asian Games in Hiroshima. The line connects central Hiroshima and Hiroshima Big Arch, which was the main stadium of the Asian Games.

On March 14, 2015 Shin-Hakushima Station opened to create a second connection between the Astram Line and the JR lines.

== History ==
Plans to build a new transit system linking the city centre of Hiroshima with the suburban area to the northwest were first proposed in July 1977.

The third-sector railway company Hiroshima Rapid Transit was founded in 1987, funded primarily by the city of Hiroshima. Groundbreaking for the rapid transit line project began on February 28, 1989, and construction would continue over a five-year period. However, on March 14, 1991, 14 people were killed when a girder collapsed on a section of the line's elevated viaduct near the Kamiyasu station's construction site. The line opened for revenue service on August 20, 1994. Because the line operates underground, train staff would need to be onboard to guide passengers to safety, the line was made manually operated.

When the line originally opened in 1994, it had 21 stations, of which Ōmachi provided the line's only transfer with a JR West line (the Kabe Line). On March 14, 2015, Shin-Hakushima opened as an infill station between Hakushima and Jōhoku in order to provide a transfer point with the Sanyo Main Line.

In January 2025, the line announced fare increases of up to ¥30 per ride. This is the first fare increase (except for the addition of sales tax as sales tax laws changed) in the over 30 years since the line opened in 1994. These fare increases will take effect from October 2025.

== Stations ==
| Station | Distance in km (mi) | | Transfers | Location |
| Station | Between stations | Total | Transfers | Location |
|---|---|---|---|---|
| Hondōri 本通 | —N/a | 0 (0) | ■ Hiroden Ujina Line (at Hondori) | Naka-ku |
| Kenchō-mae 県庁前 | 0.3 (0.19) | 0.3 (0.19) | ■ Hiroden Main Line; ■ Hiroden Ujina Line (at Kamiya-cho-higashi or Kamiya-cho-nishi) | Naka-ku |
| Jōhoku 城北 | 1.1 (0.68) | 1.4 (0.87) | | Naka-ku |
| Shin-Hakushima 新白島 | 0.3 (0.19) | 1.7 (1.1) | R Sanyo Main Line; B Kabe Line | Naka-ku |
| Hakushima 白島 | 0.4 (0.25) | 2.1 (1.3) | | Naka-ku |
| Ushita 牛田 | 0.8 (0.50) | 2.9 (1.8) | | Higashi-ku |
| Fudōin-mae 不動院前 | 1.1 (0.68) | 4.0 (2.5) | | Higashi-ku |
| Gion-shinbashi-kita 祇園新橋北 | 1.0 (0.62) | 5.0 (3.1) | | Asaminami-ku |
| Nishihara 西原 | 1.0 (0.62) | 6.0 (3.7) | | Asaminami-ku |
| Nakasuji 中筋 | 1.0 (0.62) | 7.0 (4.3) | | Asaminami-ku |
| Furuichi 古市 | 0.8 (0.50) | 7.8 (4.8) | | Asaminami-ku |
| Ōmachi 大町 | 0.6 (0.37) | 8.4 (5.2) | B Kabe Line | Asaminami-ku |
| Bishamondai 毘沙門台 | 1.2 (0.75) | 9.6 (6.0) | | Asaminami-ku |
| Yasuhigashi 安東 | 1.0 (0.62) | 10.6 (6.6) | | Asaminami-ku |
| Kamiyasu 上安 | 0.8 (0.50) | 11.4 (7.1) | | Asaminami-ku |
| Takatori 高取 | 0.6 (0.37) | 12.0 (7.5) | | Asaminami-ku |
| Chōrakuji 長楽寺 | 0.7 (0.43) | 12.7 (7.9) | | Asaminami-ku |
| Tomo 伴 | 1.2 (0.75) | 13.9 (8.6) | | Asaminami-ku |
| Ōbara 大原 | 1.0 (0.62) | 14.9 (9.3) | | Asaminami-ku |
| Tomo-chūō 伴中央 | 1.1 (0.68) | 16.0 (9.9) | | Asaminami-ku |
| Ōzuka 大塚 | 1.6 (0.99) | 17.6 (10.9) | | Asaminami-ku |
| Kōiki-kōen-mae 広域公園前 | 0.8 (0.50) | 18.4 (11.4) | | Asaminami-ku |

== Rolling stock ==
- 7000 series 6-car EMUs (24 sets; 2020–present)

As of 2021, services on the line were operated using a fleet of 23 six-car 6000 series trainsets (sets 01 to 23) and three six-car 7000 series (sets 31 to 33).

The entire fleet of 24 1000 and 6000-series sets was replaced with a new fleet of six-car trains delivered in two batches. The first of 24 new 7000 series sets was delivered in October 2019 and entered service in March 2020. The lone 1000 series set was retired in June 2020.

The 6000 series was withdrawn from service following a special final run on 18 May 2025.

=== 7000 series ===
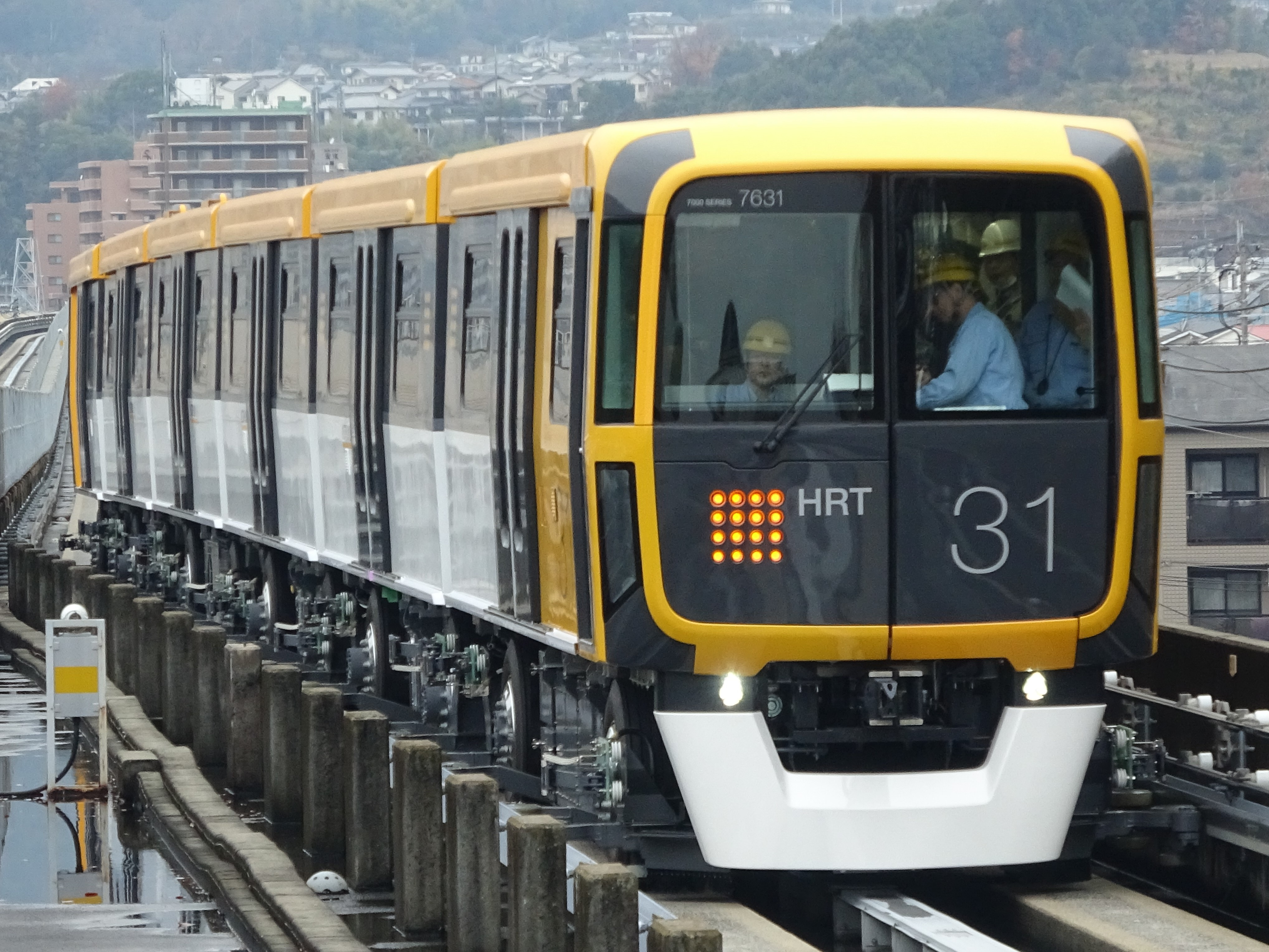
7000 series set 31 in December 2019

The 7000 series trainsets (31 to 54) are formed as follows, with all cars motored.

| Designation | Mc | M | M | M | M | Mc |
| Numbering | 71xx | 72xx | 73xx | 74xx | 75xx | 76xx |

Priority seating is provided in each car, and wheelchair spaces are provided in the end cars.

=== Former rolling stock ===
==== 6000 series ====
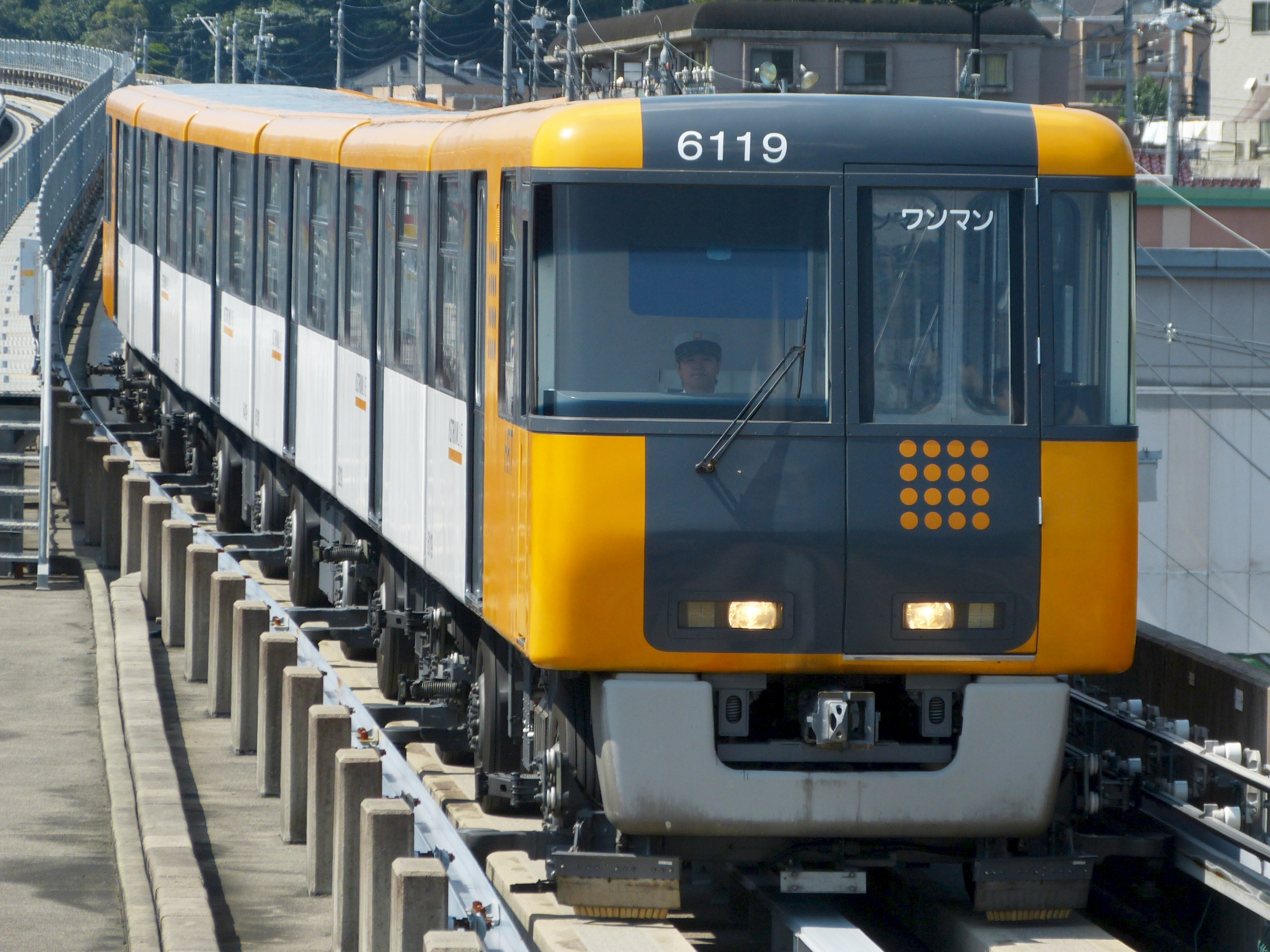
6000 series set 19 in September 2012

The 6000 series trainsets (01 to 23) were formed as follows, with all cars motored.

| Designation | Mc | M | M | M | M | Mc |
| Numbering | 61xx | 62xx | 63xx | 64xx | 65xx | 66xx |

Priority seating was provided in each car, and wheelchair spaces were provided in the end cars.

==== 1000 series ====
The 1000 series trainset (24) was formed as follows, with four of the six cars motored.

| Designation | Tc | M | M | M | M | Tc |
| Numbering | 1124 | 1224 | 1324 | 1424 | 1524 | 1624 |

Priority seating was provided in each car, and wheelchair spaces were provided in the end cars.

== See also ==
- List of rapid transit systems
- Medium-capacity rail system
