= Asaminami-ku =

Asaminami-ku 安佐南区
- Ward
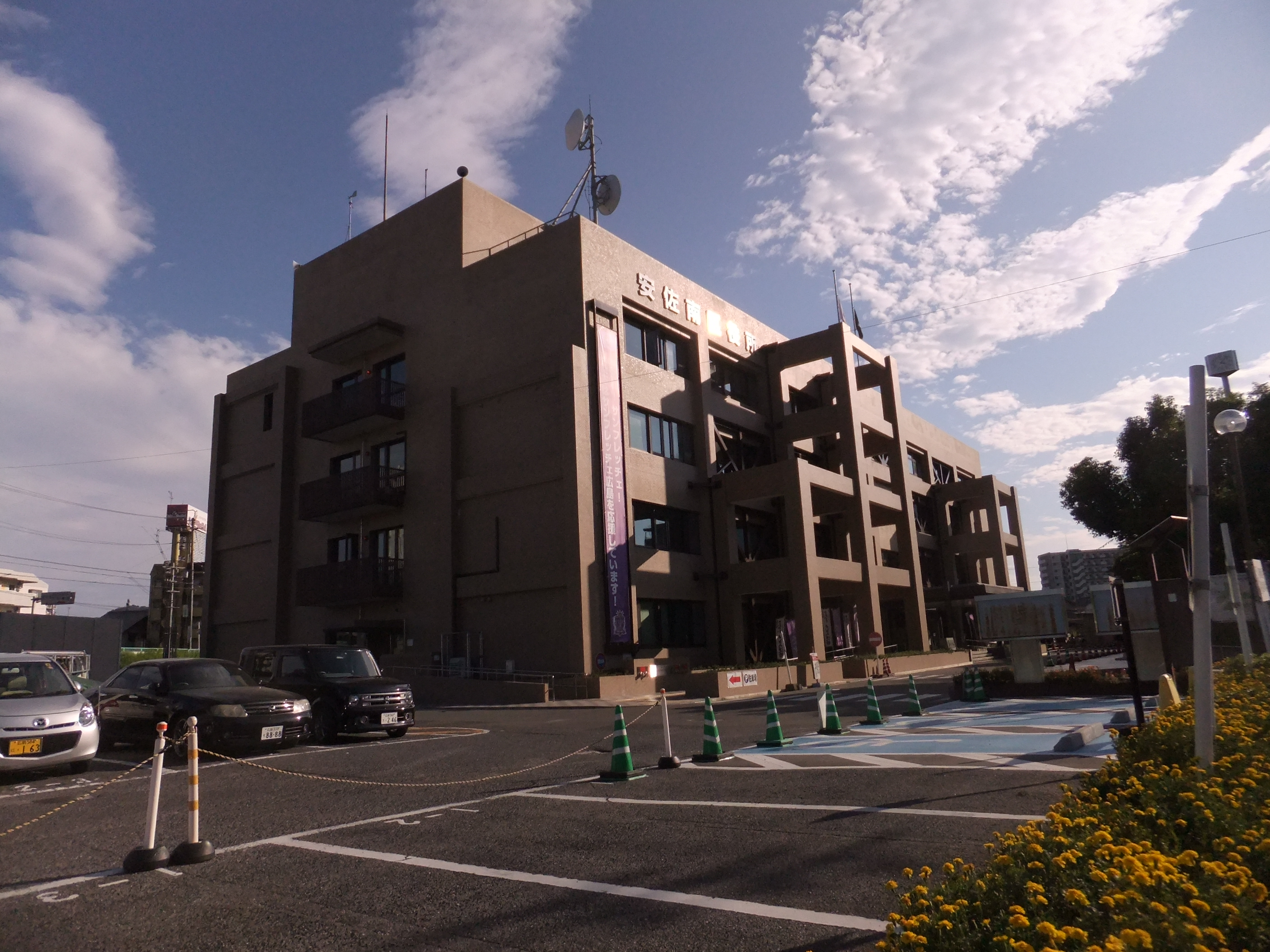
- Asaminami Ward Office

- Flag Seal

- Location of Asaminami-ku in Hiroshima City

- Location within Japan
- Coordinates: 34°27′07″N 132°28′19″E
- Country: Japan
- Region: Chūgoku (Sanyo)
- Prefecture: Hiroshima
- City: Hiroshima
- Established: April 1, 1980

Area
  - Total: 117.24 km^{2} (45.27 sq mi)

Population (January 1, 2018) (Note: The density was calculated based on the population estimates and the total area.)
  - Total: 245,475
  - Density: 2,094/km^{2} (5,420/sq mi)
- Time zone: UTC+9 (Japan Standard Time)
- Postal: 731-0193
- Asaminami Ward Office's Address: Furuichi 1-33-14, Asaminami-ku, Hiroshima City, Hiroshima Prefecture (広島県広島市安佐南区古市1丁目33番14号)
- Phone: 81-(0)82-831-4925, 831-4927
- Website: Official site

Asaminami-ku (安佐南区) is one of the eight wards of the city of Hiroshima, located in the south of former Asa District.

== Merge ==
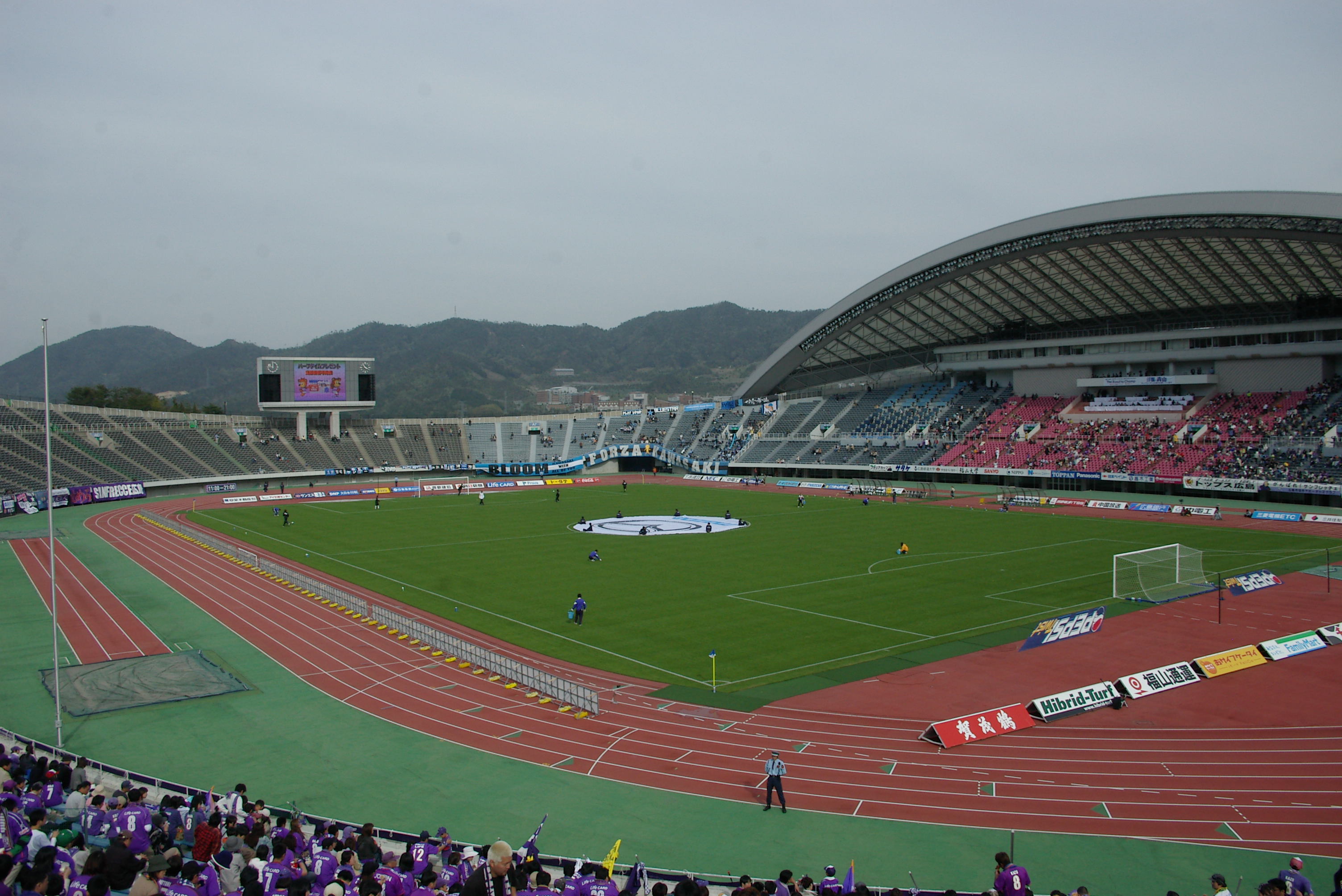
Hiroshima Big Arch

Asa District consisted of Gion-cho, Yasufuruichi-cho, Sato-cho, Numata-cho. After being merged with Hiroshima in 1973, this ward was named Asaminami-ku. The largest station of Astramline, a new traffic system, is in Asaminami-ku. This system brought population inflow.

== Population ==
As of January 1, 2018, the ward has an estimated population of 245,475, with 101,941 households and a density of 2094 persons per km^{2}. The total area is 117.24 km^{2}.

== Transportation ==
=== JR-Kabe line ===
- Aki-Nagatsuka,
- Shimo-Gion,
- Furuichibashi,
- Ōmachi,
- Midorii,
- Shichigenjaya,
- Bairin,
- Kami-Yagi

=== Astram line ===
- Gion-shinbashi-kita,
- Nishihara,
- Nakasuji,
- Furuichi,
- Ōmachi,
- Bishamondai,
- Yasuhigashi,
- Kamiyasu,
- Takatori,
- Chōrakuji,
- Tomo,
- Ōbara,
- Tomo-chūō,
- Ōzuka,
- Koiki-koen-mae

=== Expressway ===
- San'yō Expressway
  - Hiroshima IC
  - Numata PA
  - Hiroshima JCT
- Hiroshima Expressway (West Nippon Expressway Company)
  - Hiroshimaseifushinto IC
- Hiroshima Expressway
  - Numata IC

== Industry ==
Hiroshima Mitsubishi Heavy Industries in Gion closed its doors in 2003.

== Education ==
- Hiroshima City University
- Hiroshima University of Economics
- Hiroshima Shudo University
- Yasuda Women's University

== Agriculture ==
Former Sato-cho, now a part of the ward, has been a major production area for Hiroshimana since Meiji era. Hiroshimana is a variety of Chinese cabbage and is the main material used for making Hiroshimanazuke (literally "pickled Hiroshimana").

== Landslide ==
In August 2014 many people died in a landslide after very heavy rain.
