= Hiroshima City University =

Higher education institution in Hiroshima, Japan

Coordinates: 34°26′18″N 132°24′52″E

- Hiroshima shiritsu daigaku
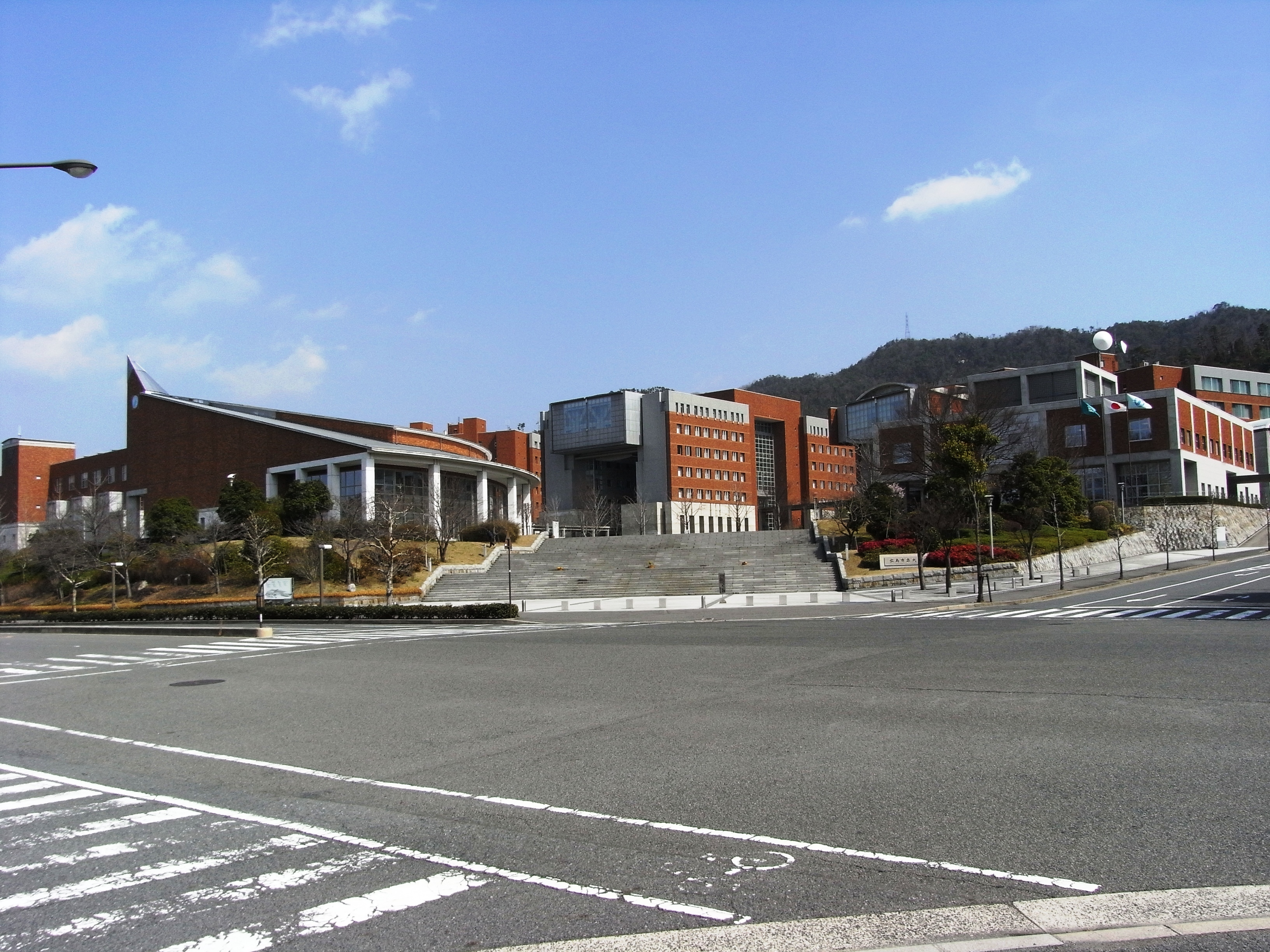
- Hiroshima City University
- Type: Public
- Established: 1994
- Location: Hiroshima, Hiroshima, Japan
- Website: www.hiroshima-cu.ac.jp
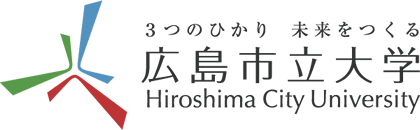

Hiroshima City University (広島市立大学, Hiroshima shiritsu daigaku) is a public university at Hiroshima, Hiroshima, Japan, founded in 1994, educating both undergraduates and graduate students. HCU is especially distinctive for its Peace Studies program, in line with Hiroshima's status as an international city of peace.

== Faculties and Graduate Schools ==
- Faculty / Graduate School of Information Sciences
  - Department of Computer and Network Engineering
  - Department of Intelligent Systems
  - Department of Systems Engineering
  - Department of Biomedical Information Sciences
- Faculty / Graduate School of International Studies
  - Department of International Studies
- Faculty / Graduate School of Arts
  - Department of Fine Arts
  - Department of Painting
  - Department of Sculpture
  - Department of Design and Applied Arts
- Graduate School of Peace Studies

== Hiroshima Peace Institute ==
The Hiroshima Peace Institute (HPI) was established on April 1, 1998, as a research institute affiliated with HCU, located in the city that experienced the first atomic bombing in human history.
