= Kōiki-kōen-mae Station =

Railway station in Hiroshima, Hiroshima prefecture, Japan

Kōiki-kōen-mae 広域公園前駅
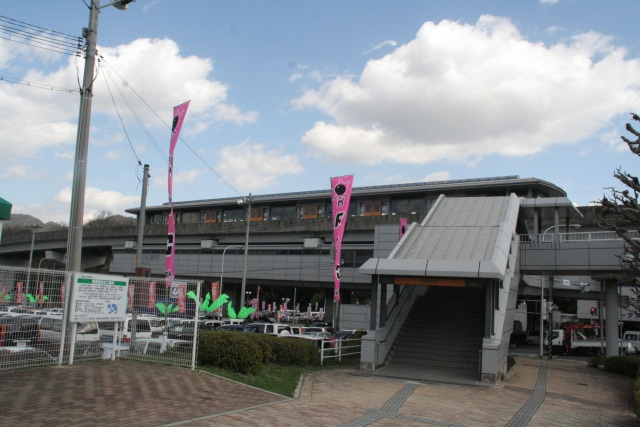
- Kōiki-kōen-mae Station

General information
- Location: 4-4-8, Ozuka-nishi, Asaminami-ku, Hiroshima; Japan
- Coordinates: 34°26′07″N 132°24′01″E
- Line: Astram Line
- Platforms: 1 island platform
- Tracks: 2

Construction
- Structure type: elevated station, terminal station

History
- Opened: 20 August 1994; 31 years ago

Services
Preceding station	Hiroshima Rapid Transit	Following station
Ōzuka towards Hondōri	Astram Line	Terminus
Location
- Location within Hiroshima Prefecture Location within Japan

Kōiki-kōen-mae Station is a HRT terminal station on Astram Line, located in 4-4-8, Ozuka-nishi, Asaminami-ku, Hiroshima. The station services the Big Arch Stadium.

== Platforms ==
1	█ Get off only
2	█	for Hondōri

== Connections ==
█ Astram Line
●Ōzuka — ●Kōiki-kōen-mae

== Around station ==
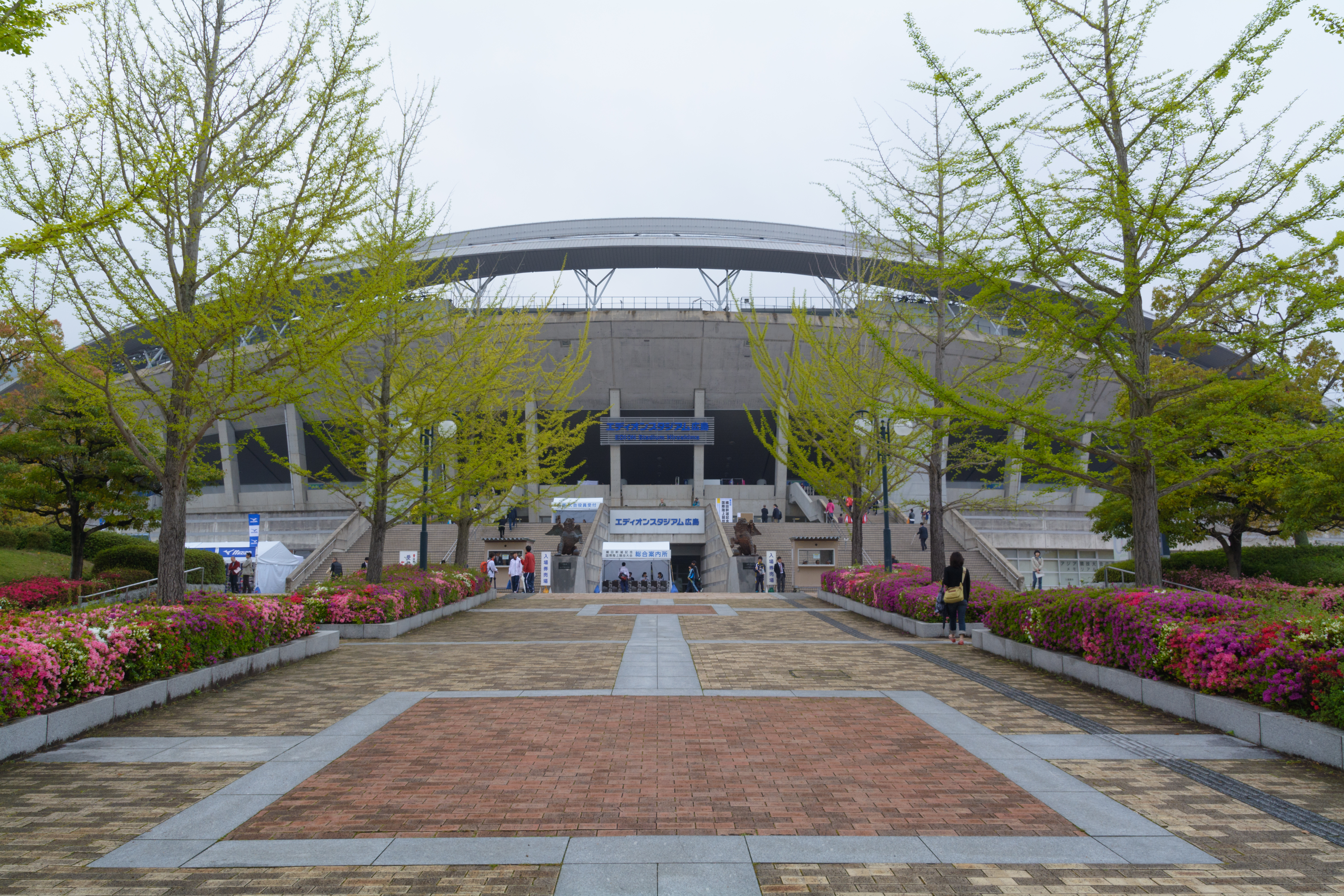
Hiroshima Big Arch

- Hiroshima Kouiki Kouen
- Hiroshima Big Arch
- Hiroshima Shudo University
- Hiroshima Seifu-shinto

== History ==
- Opened on August 20, 1994.

== See also ==
- Astram Line
- Hiroshima Rapid Transit
- Sanfrecce Hiroshima
