= Hiroshima Rapid Transit =

Transport company in Hiroshima, Japan

Hiroshima Rapid Transit Co., Ltd.

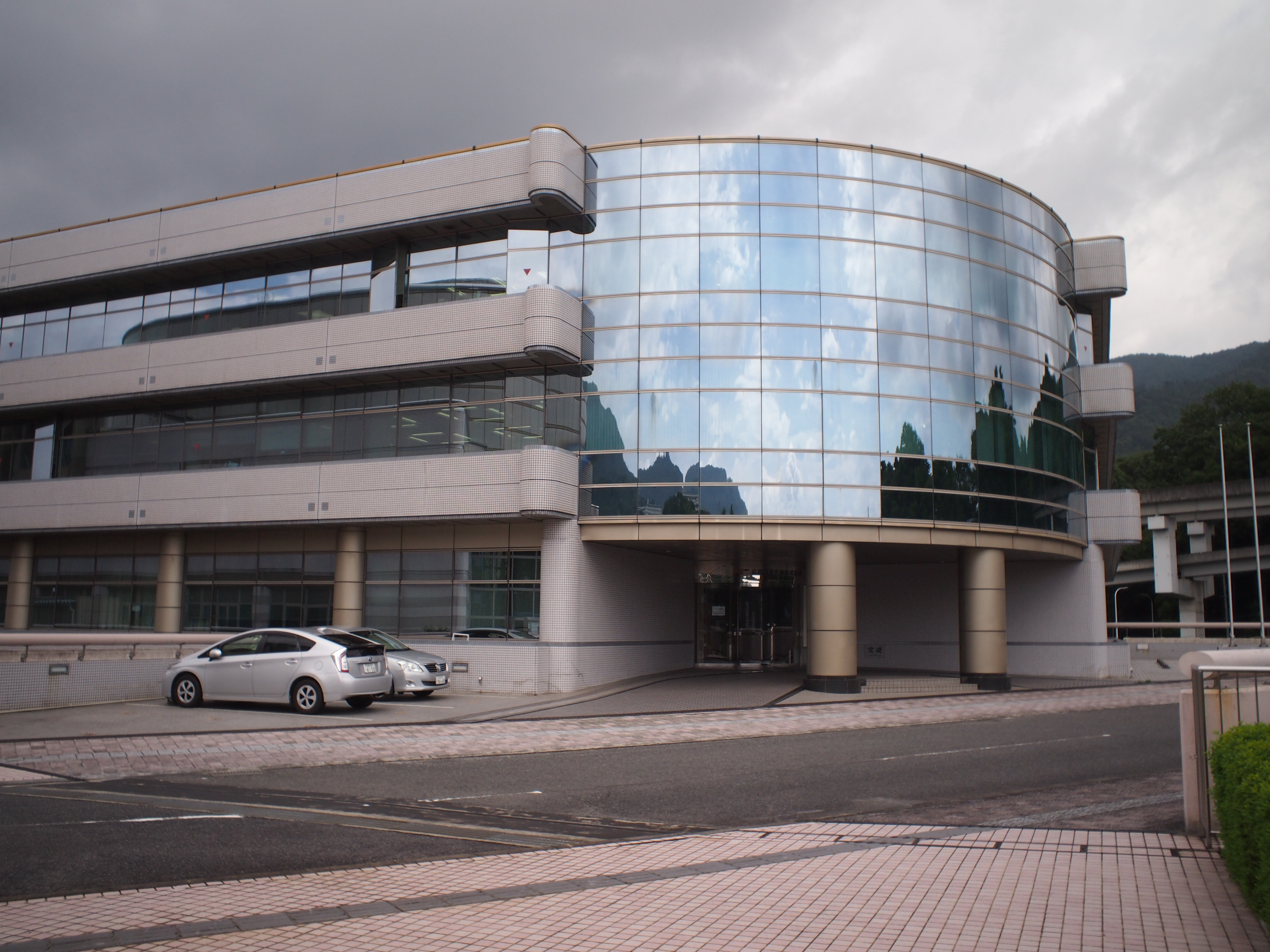
- Hiroshima Rapid Transit head office
- Native name: 広島高速交通株式会社
- Company type: Third-sector
- Industry: Transportation
- Founded: December 1, 1987
- Headquarters: Asaminami-ku, Hiroshima, Hiroshima Prefecture, Japan
- Website: www.astramline.co.jp

Hiroshima Rapid Transit Co., Ltd. (広島高速交通株式会社, Hiroshima Kosoku Kotsu Kabushiki-gaisha) is a third-sector railway railway company based in Hiroshima, Japan.

Hiroshima Rapid Transit operates a rapid transit line (manually driven people mover) called the Astram Line in Hiroshima.

== Major Shareholders ==
200,000 shares have been issued to 29 shareholders.

- City of Hiroshima 51%
- Development Bank of Japan 10%
- Chugoku Electric Power Company 5%
- Hiroshima Bank [ja] 5%
