= Hiroshima Museum of Art =

Art museum in Japan

Coordinates: 34.398668°N 132.45806°E

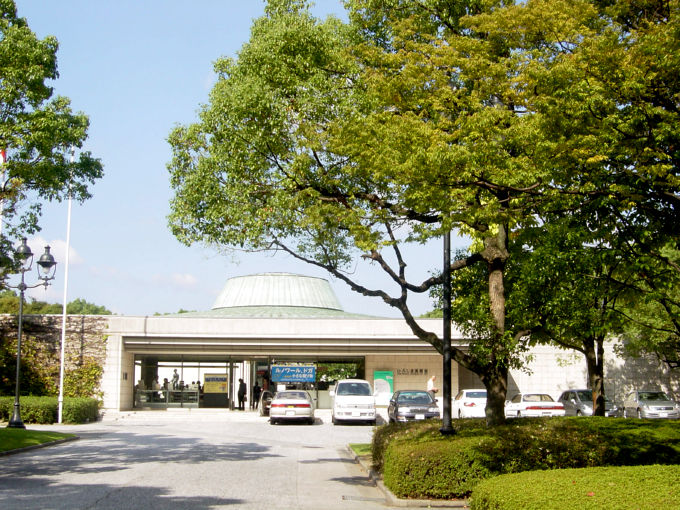
- Established: 1978
- Location: 3-2 Motomachi, Naka-ku, Hiroshima
- Website: www.hiroshima-museum.jp

The Hiroshima Museum of Art (ひろしま美術館, Hiroshima Bijutsukan) is an art museum founded in 1978. It is located in the Hiroshima Central Park in Hiroshima, Japan.

== Collections ==
=== Gallery 1 ===
- From Romanticism to Impressionism

Works	Artist
L'Arabe au tombeau, Soldat à l'épée	Eugène Delacroix
Le moissonneur, Le ramasseur des fagots, soleil couchant	Jean-François Millet
Les baigneuses des Ile Borromées, Paysanne assise dans la verdure, tenant une guirlande de fleurs	Camille Corot
Quai de l'Hôtel de ville et le marché aux pommes	Stanislas Lépine
Combat de cerfs dans la neige	Gustave Courbet
La femme au soulier rose (Berthe Morisot), Femme au chapeau à plume grise	Édouard Manet
La promenade à cheval, La femme au tub, Danseuse en robe rouge	Edgar Degas
Paysage à Bordeaux	Eugène Boudin
Paysage Hollande, Matinée sur la Seine(Bras de la Seine Près de Giverny)	Claude Monet
St. Mammès	Alfred Sisley
Place de la Trinité (Paris), Le bras vif a Croissy (Seine-et-Oise), Judgement de Pâris, Femme au chapeau de paille, Vénus à la pomme	Auguste Renoir
Baigneuses (Étude), Le Pont Neuf	Camille Pissarro

=== Gallery 2 ===
- Neo-Impressionists and Post-Impressionists

L'arbre tordu, Paysan assis	Paul Cézanne
Le jardin de Daubigny	Vincent van Gogh
Jeunes Bretons au bain (La baignade au moulin du Bois)	Paul Gauguin
Vers le bourg	Georges Seurat
Portrieux, Gouverlo, Paris, Le Pont-Neuf	Paul Signac
Le refrain de la chaise Louis XIII au cabaret d'Aristide Bruant, Aristide Bruant	Henri de Toulouse-Lautrec
Pégase, cheval sur le rocher, Les fleurs dans un vase bleu	Odilon Redon
Nature morte	Pierre Laprade
Mlle. Meissner	Edvard Munch
Vue des fortifications	Henri Rousseau
Personages	André Bauchant
Le pavillon	Henri Le Sidaner
Place Pigalle, Jeune fille au corsage blanc (Mlle. Leïla Claude Anet)	Pierre Bonnard
Nu debout dans l'atelier	Édouard Vuillard
Idole à la perle	Paul Gauguin
Vue de St. Tropez	André Dunoyer de Segonzac

=== Gallery 3 ===
- Fauvism and Picasso

La France, Jeune fille en vert dans intérieur rouge	Henri Matisse
Panorama, Paysage de Provence, Nu dans un paysage, Femme blonde dans un paysage	André Derain
Vase de fleurs, Paysage dans la neige, Paysage avec arbres	Maurice de Vlaminck
Le Pont Neuf et la Samaritaine	Albert Marquet
Pierrot, Les deux frères, pierrot et clown	Georges Rouault
Epsom, le défilé de Derby	Raoul Dufy
Can Can, Deux femmes au bar, Buste de femme (Fernande), Quatre baigneuses, Maternité, Paul, fils de l'artiste, à deux ans, avec son agneau, Femme aux mains jointes, Buste de femme	Pablo Picasso
Compotier et fruits	Georges Braque
La danse - 1er état	Fernand Léger
Danseuse tennant son pied droit avec sa main droite	Edgar Degas

=== Gallery 4 ===
- Ecole de Paris

Portrait de jeune fille à la blouse bleue, Portrait de homme, Tête	Amedeo Modigliani
La femme à la chaise, Nature morte au pot blanc et au hareng	Chaïm Soutine
Esquisse pour "La Maison meublée", Deux femmes et une biche, Femme au bouquet de fleurs	Marie Laurencin
Rue à Montmorency, La Cathédrale Saint-Pierre à Angoulême (Charente)	Maurice Utrillo
La Roumaine, Fleurs	Moise Kisling
Princesse Ghika, La dame en vert	Jules Pascin
Nu allongé au chat, Annonciation, Adoration des Rois Mages, Descente de croix, Asissi, Femme de profil	Léonard Foujita
Vue de Vitebsk, L'Inspiration, Ma grande mère, Les amoureux au bouquet, Près de la rivière	Marc Chagall
Vue de Venise, Le couple	Kees van Dongen

=== Gallery 5-8 ===
- Modern Japanese Paintings of Western-Style

Peonies	Shotaro Koyama
Farmers returning to home	Chu Asai
Lamp and two children, European woman in white dress	Seiki Kuroda
Six themes about the music, Nude and peach blossoms, Sunrise, Raging billows at Daio-misaki Promontory	Takeji Fujishima
Nude, Nude by the pond	Saburōsuke Okada
Departing spring	Sigeru Aoki
Girl	Shintaro Yamashita
Villa Gournay in the suburbs of Paris, The tethered horse	Hanjiro Sakamoto
Girl playing the piano, Morning in the village of highlands	Kunzo Minami
Coal heavers in Soshu, China, Kasube and Fugu, Oishida in February	Heizo Kanayama
Still life with a globe, Self-portrait with a hat	Narashige Koide
Nude, Karuizawa in autumn	Ryuzaburo Umehara
Studio	Soutaro Yasui
The waterworks in a spring day, Terukoin Chinese dress, portrait of the artist's younger sister	Ryusei Kishida
Mt. Hiei	Kunitaro Suda
Landscape	Harue Koga
Red cap	Kanji Maeta
Reclining Nude, Nude	Takeshi Hayashi
Location de Voiture, Landscape, Nude(reverse)	Yuzo Saeki
A corner of the poor cafe	Makoto Saburi
Snows	Shikanosuke Oka
Shallows	Noriyuki Ushijima
A landscape of Venice	Takanori Ogisu
Portrait of a woman in the room, Dancer, Roses	Ryohei Koiso
A flock of birds (Dead trees)	Kinosuke Ebihara
Melons, Roses	Morikazu Kumagai
Tsuwano (Shimane prefecture)	Yasuo Kazuki
A drunk of my village, Wall, Singing toward the moon, Drunkards in my village, Church, Etude B, White Woman	Rey Kamoi

== Access ==
- Astram Line Kencho-mae Station
- Hiroden Kamiya-cho-higashi Station
- Hiroden Kamiya-cho-nishi Station
- Hiroshima Bus Center

== See also ==
- Hiroshima Prefectural Art Museum
- Hiroshima City Museum of Contemporary Art
