= Hiroshima Art Museum =

Hiroshima Art Museum may refer to:

- Hiroshima City Museum of Contemporary Art
- Hiroshima Museum of Art
- Hiroshima Prefectural Art Museum
