= Hakushima Station =

Hakushima Station (白島駅) is the name of two train stations in Hiroshima, Japan:

- Hakushima Station (Astram Line)
- Hakushima Station (Hiroden)
