= Shukkeien-mae Station =

Tram stop in Hiroshima, Japan

Shukkeien-mae 縮景園前
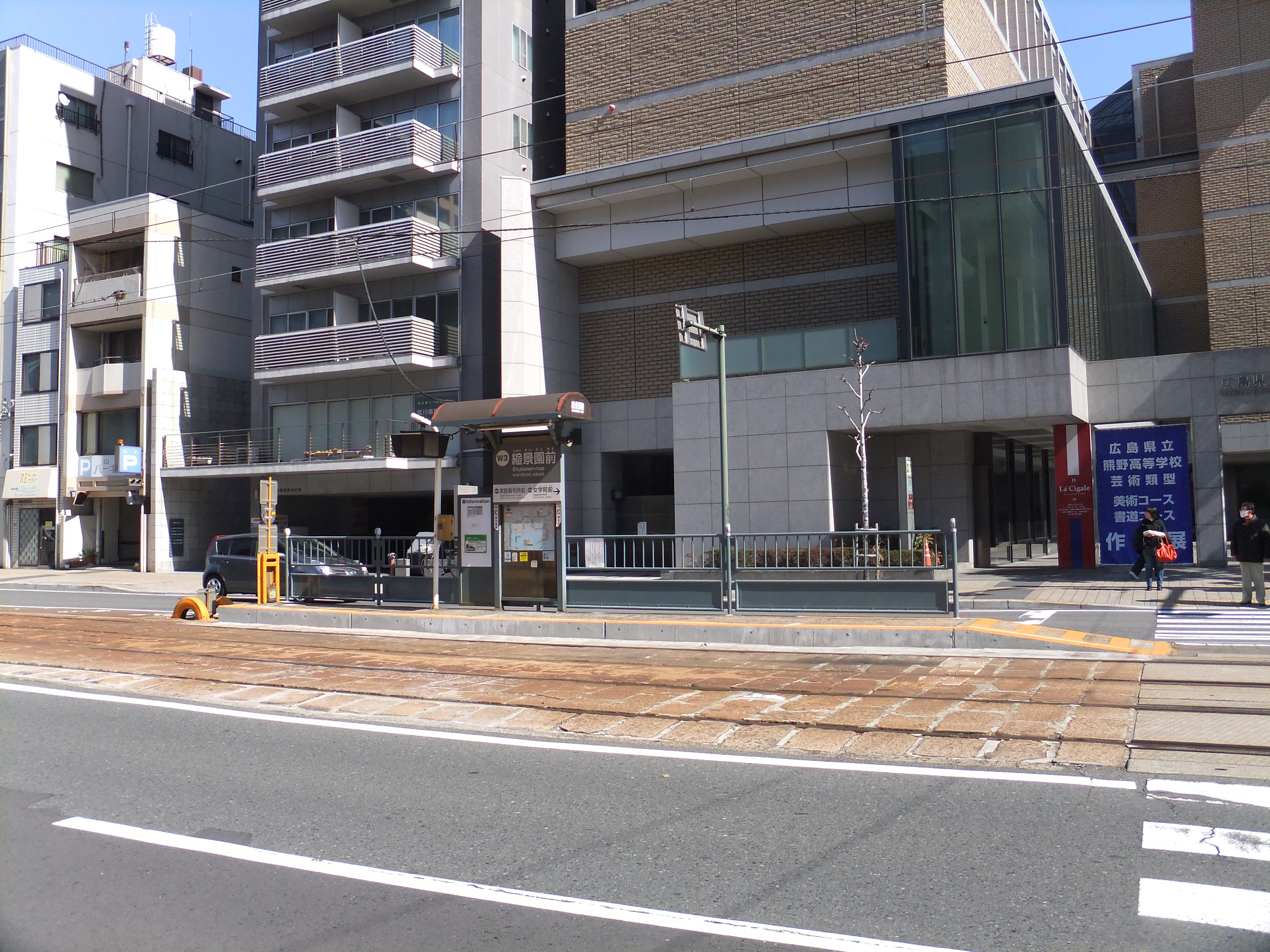

General information
- Location: Kami-hatchobori, Naka-ku, Hiroshima; Japan
- Coordinates: 34°23′59″N 132°27′55″E
- Operator: Hiroshima Electric Railway
- Lines: Hiroden Hakushima Line; Route 9
- Platforms: 2 side platforms

Other information
- Station code: W02

History
- Opened: November 23, 1912
Location

Shukkeien-mae is a Hiroden station on the Hiroden Hakushima Line, located in Kamihatchobori, Naka-ku, Hiroshima. The station serves the nearby Shukkei-en, and is operated by the Hiroshima Electric Railway.

== Routes ==
There is one route that serves Shukkeien-mae Station:

- 9 Hakushima - Hatchobori Route

== Station layout ==
The station consists of two staggered side platforms serving two tracks. Crosswalks connect the platforms with the sidewalk. There is a small shelter located on the middle of each platform.

== Adjacent stations ==
«	Service	»
Hiroden Hakushima Line
Jogakuin-mae	Route 9	Katei Saibansho-mae

== Surrounding area ==
- Shukkei-en
- Hiroshima Prefectural Art Museum
- Hiroshima High Court
- Noborimachi Junior High School

== History ==
- Opened on November 23, 1912.

== See also ==
- Hiroden lines and routes
