= Ushida Station =

Ushida Station is the name of several train stations in Japan.

- Ushida Station (Aichi) - In Aichi Prefecture, run by Nagoya Railroad
- Ushida Station (Tokyo) - In Tokyo, run by Tobu Railway

== See also ==
- Ushita Station, a station in Hiroshima with the same Kanji as the above stations
