= Hatchobori Station (Hiroshima) =

Tram stop in Hiroshima, Japan

Hatchobori 八丁堀
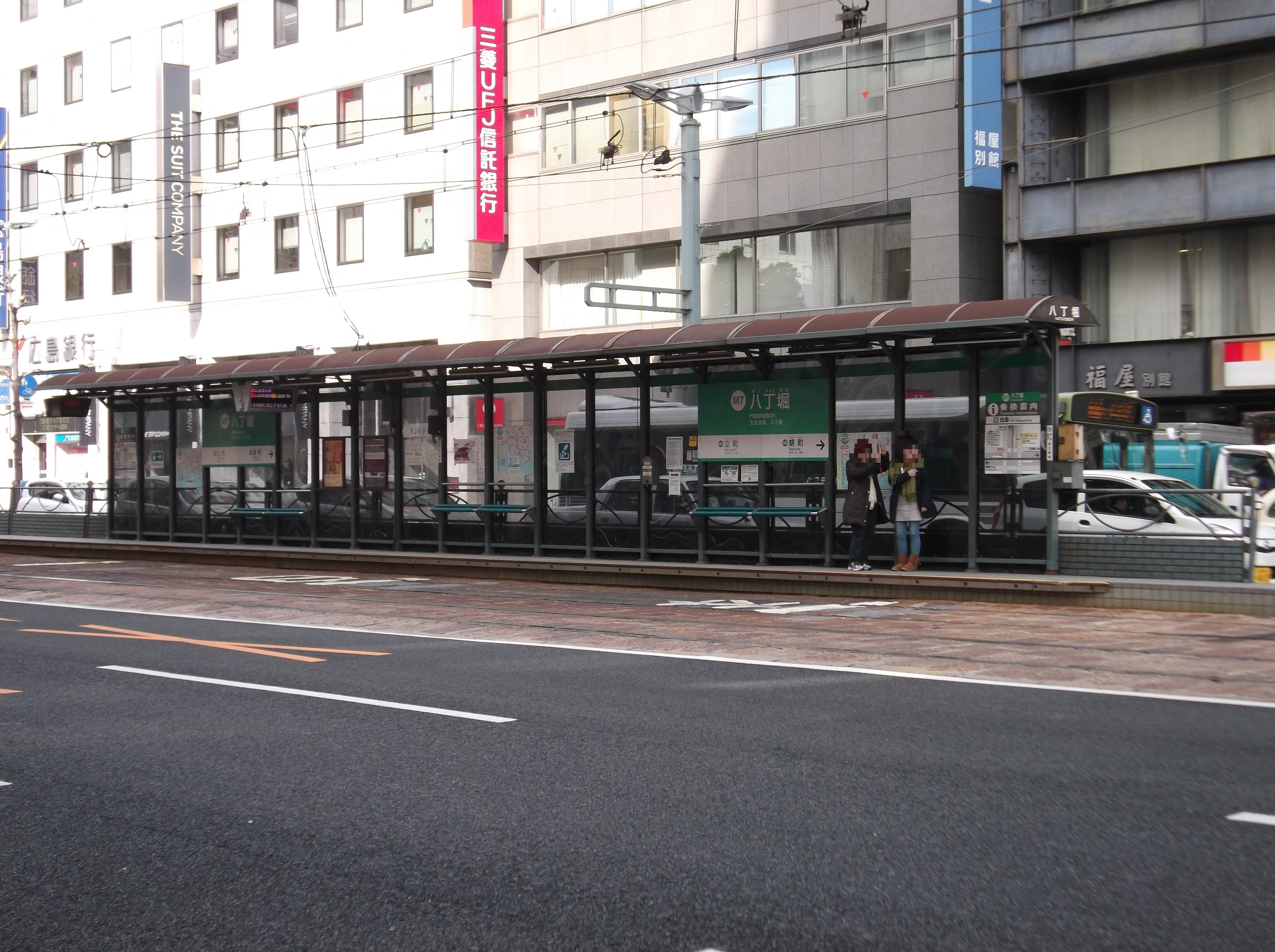
- One of the Main Line platforms

General information
- Location: Hatchobori, Naka-ku, Hiroshima; Japan
- Coordinates: 34°23′39″N 132°27′49″E
- Operator: Hiroshima Electric Railway
- Lines: Hiroden Main Line; Hiroden Hakushima Line; Route 1 2 6 9
- Platforms: 3 side platforms

Other information
- Station code: M05

History
- Opened: November 23, 1912
Location

Hatchobori (八丁堀停留場, Hatchōbori Teiryūjō) is a Hiroden station on the Hiroden Main Line and Hiroden Hakushima Line, located in Hatchobori, Naka-ku, Hiroshima.

== Routes ==
There are four routes that serve Hatchobori Station:

- 1 Hiroshima Station – Hiroshima Port Route
- 2 Hiroshima Station - Hiroden-miyajima-guchi Route
- 6 Hiroshima Station - Eba Route
- 9 Hakushima - Eba Route

== Station layout ==
The station consists of three side platforms. The station is located on an intersection. One side platform is for the Hakushima Line, and is located to the north of the intersection. The Main Line platforms are staggered, and are located west and east of the intersection. Crosswalks connect the platforms with the sidewalk. The Main Line platforms have a shelter along the whole length of the platform, while the Hakushima Line platform has a small shelter located in the middle of the platform.

=== Platforms ===
North	■ Hiroden Hakushima Line	for Hakushima
West	■ Hiroden Main Line	for Hiroshima (Route 1/2/6), Hakushima (Route 9, limited)
East	■ Hiroden Main Line	for Kamiya-cho-higashi, Dobashi (Route 2/6), Hiroshima Port (Route 1), Hiroden-miyajima-guchi (Route 2), Eba (Route 6)

== Adjacent stations ==
«	Service	»
Hiroden Main Line
Ebisu-cho	Route 1	Tate-machi
Ebisu-cho	Route 2	Tate-machi
Ebisu-cho	Route 6	Tate-machi
Hiroden Hakushima Line
Tate-machi (Main Line, limited)	Route 9	Jogakuin-mae

== Surrounding area ==
- Fukuya Hatchobori
- Tenmaya Hiroshima
- Okonomi-mura

== History ==
- Opened on November 23, 1912.
- Moved location on June 10, 1952.

== See also ==
- Hiroden lines and routes
