= Hiroden Hakushima Line =

Tram line in Hiroshima, Japan

The Hakushima line (白島線, Hakushima-sen) is a streetcar line of Hiroshima Electric Railway (Hiroden) in Hiroshima, Japan. The line has operated since 1912.

The total distance of the line is 1.2 kilometers. Route 9 operates on the line. The line has five stations, numbered W1 through W5.

== Stations ==
No.	Station	Routes	Connections
M05	Hatchobori		█ Hiroden Main Line
W01	Jogakuin-mae		
W02	Shukkeien-mae		★ (Shukkei-en)
W03	Katei Saibansho-mae		
W04	Hakushima		
