= Heizō =

- Gender: Male

Origin
- Origin: Japanese
- Meaning: Different meanings depending on the kanji used

Heizō, Heizo or Heizou (written: 平蔵 or 平三) is a masculine Japanese given name. Notable people with the name include:

- Heizo Kanayama (金山 平三; 1883–1964), Japanese painter
- Heizō Takenaka (竹中 平蔵; born 1951), Japanese economist and politician

Fictional characters with the name include:

- Shikanoin Heizou, a character in 2020 video game Genshin Impact
