= Hatchōbori Station =

Hatchōbori Station may refer to:

- Hatchōbori Station (Tokyo) - (八丁堀駅) served by Keiyō Line
- Hatchobori Station (Hiroshima) - (八丁堀駅) served by Hiroshima Electric Railway Main Line and Hakushima Line
