= Tate-machi Station =

Tram station in Hiroshima, Japan

Coordinates: 34.3948°N 132.4607°E

Tate-machi 立町
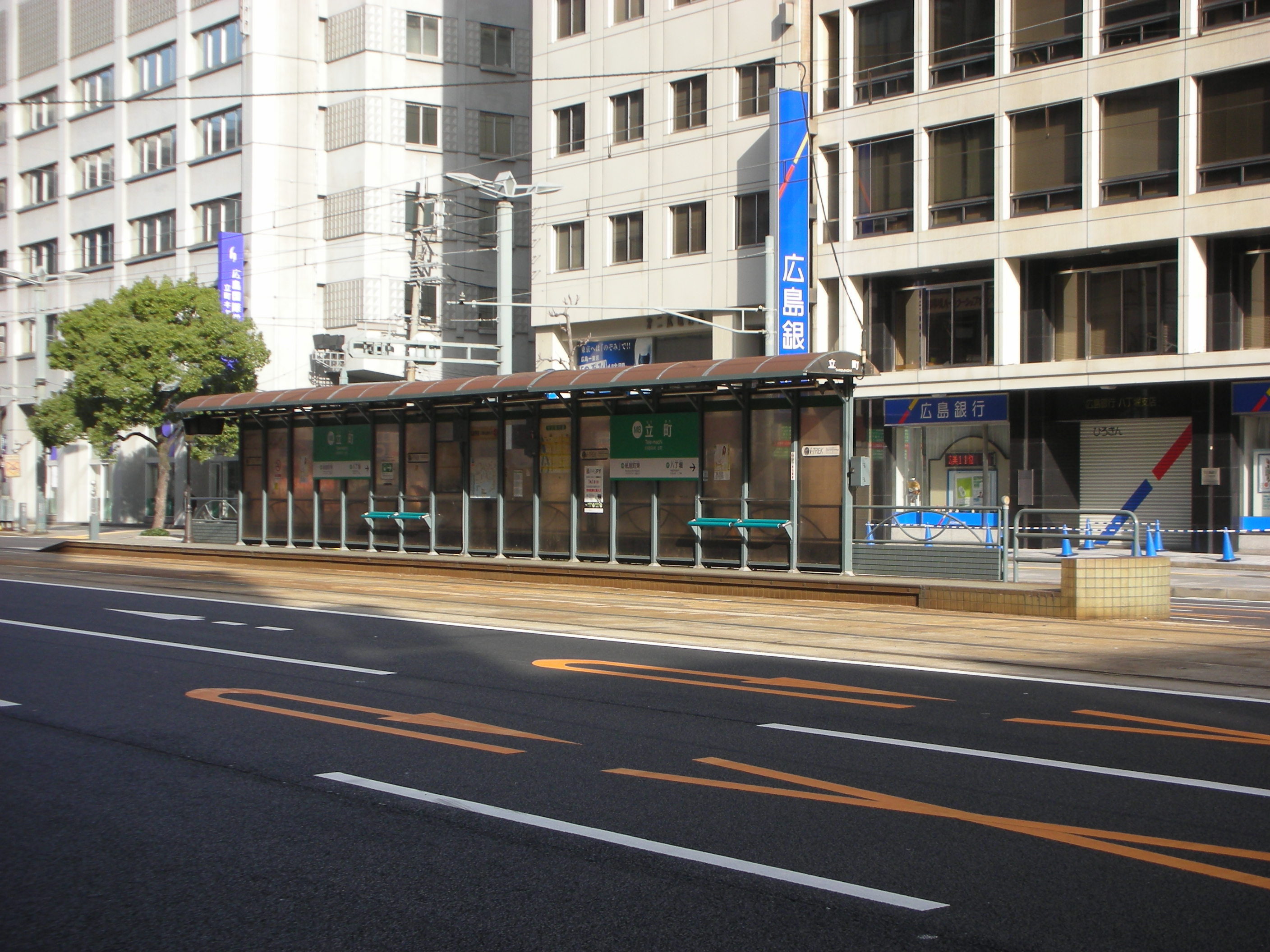

General information
- Location: Tate-machi, Naka-ku, Hiroshima; Japan
- Operator: Hiroshima Electric Railway
- Lines: █ Hiroden Main Line; Route

Other information
- Station code: M06

History
- Opened: June 10, 1952
Location

Tate-machi is a Hiroden station (tram stop) on Hiroden Main Line, located in Tate-machi, Naka-ku, Hiroshima.

== Routes ==
From Tate-machi Station, there are three of Hiroden Streetcar routes.

- Hiroshima Station - Hiroshima Port Route
- Hiroshima Station - Hiroden-miyajima-guchi Route
- Hiroshima Station - Eba Route

== Connections ==
█ Main Line

Hatchobori — Tate-machi — Kamiya-cho-higashi

== Around station ==
- Hiroshima Hondori Syoutengai
- Tokyu Hands Hiroshima
- Hiroshima Kokusai Gakuin University Tate-machi campus
- Hiroshima Andersen

== History ==
- Opened as "Kougai-Bus-mae" on June 10, 1952.
- Renamed to the present name, "Tate-machi" on July 29, 1957.

== See also ==
- Hiroden lines and routes
