= Hyōgo Prefectural Museum of Art =

Coordinates: 34°41′57.09″N 135°13′4.84″E

- 兵庫県立美術館
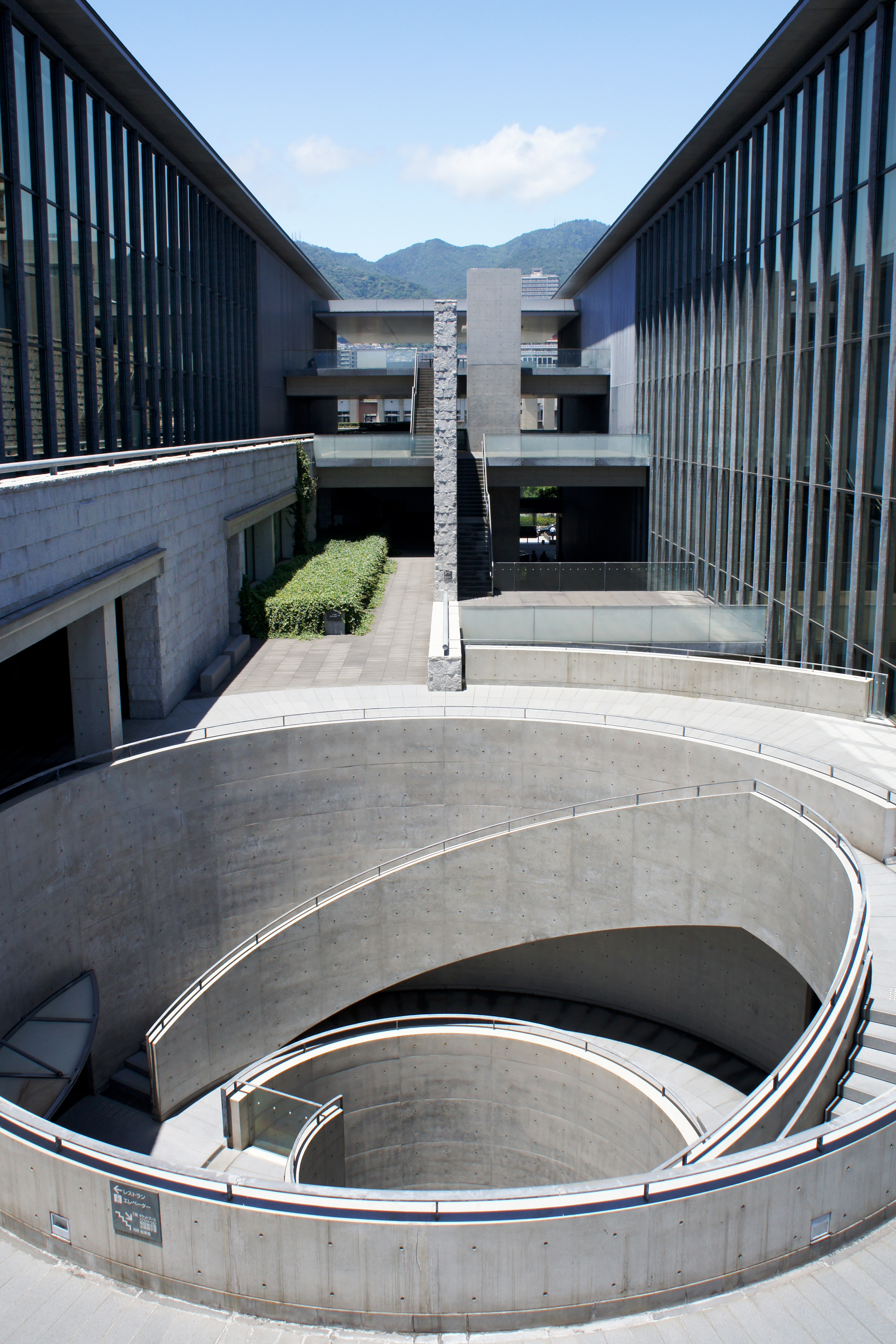
- An inner courtyard of the museum
- Established: 2002
- Location: 1-1-1 Wakinohama Kaigan-dōri, Chūō-ku, Kobe, Hyōgo Prefecture, Japan
- Type: Art museum
- Architect: Tadao Ando
- Website: www.artm.pref.hyogo.jp

The Hyōgo Prefectural Museum of Art (兵庫県立美術館, Hyōgo Kenritsu Bijutsukan) is a purpose built prefectural art gallery in Chūō-ku, Kobe, Hyōgo Prefecture, Japan. Planned as part of the reconstruction after the 1995 Great Hanshin earthquake, it was opened in 2002. It stands in HAT Kobe, a waterfront district built after the earthquake, and succeeded the Hyōgo Prefectural Museum of Modern Art, which had opened in 1970. Its nickname is Geijutsu no Yakata ("House of Art").

The major collections of the museum are foreign and Japanese sculptures, foreign and Japanese prints, Western-style and Japanese-style paintings associated with Hyogo Prefecture, Japanese greatworks in modern era, and contemporary art.

The museum has rooms dedicated to Ryōhei Koiso and Kanayama Heizō, two significant Japanese modernist artists trained in the European tradition.

== Architecture ==
Outdoor terrace under the cantilevered canopy

The circular terrace and spiral stair

The museum building was designed by Japanese architect Tadao Ando. In May 2019 the "Ando Gallery", a free permanent exhibition of Ando's architecture, opened in a new three-storey annex between the existing exhibition and gallery wings. Ando's office, Tadao Ando Architect & Associates, paid the design and construction costs of about ¥520 million and donated the annex to the prefecture in September 2018.

The spiral stair seen from above

Circular terrace beneath a curved concrete wall

Covered walkway between the glass-clad gallery wings

Curved concrete wall and stair

== Collection ==
In 2019 the prefecture received two collections for the museum. The Egawa Collection, assembled by the Osaka businessman Egawa Tokusuke (1899–1976), had mostly been held by the Egawa Museum of Art in Nishinomiya, which opened in 1973; when the foundation that ran it was dissolved at the end of March 2019, about 250 works passed to the prefectural museum, among them four Important Cultural Properties. The Mei Shushi Collection was donated by the family of the seal engraver Mei Shushi (Inada Bun'ichi, 1916–2008). It comprises Chinese calligraphy and painting of the early modern and modern periods, scholars' implements and books that he collected over some sixty years, together with his own calligraphy, painting and seals.

== Former Museum of Modern Art ==
The building of the former Hyōgo Prefectural Museum of Modern Art in Nada-ku, designed by Tōgo Murano, now serves as an annex of the museum. Its west wing was renovated and reopened in November 2012 as the Yokoo Tadanori Museum of Contemporary Art, which houses works given or lent by the artist Tadanori Yokoo.

== Directors ==
Hayashi Yōko became director in April 2023.
