= Jogakuin-mae Station =

Hiroden station in Naka-ku, Hiroshima, Japan

Jogakuin-mae 女学院前
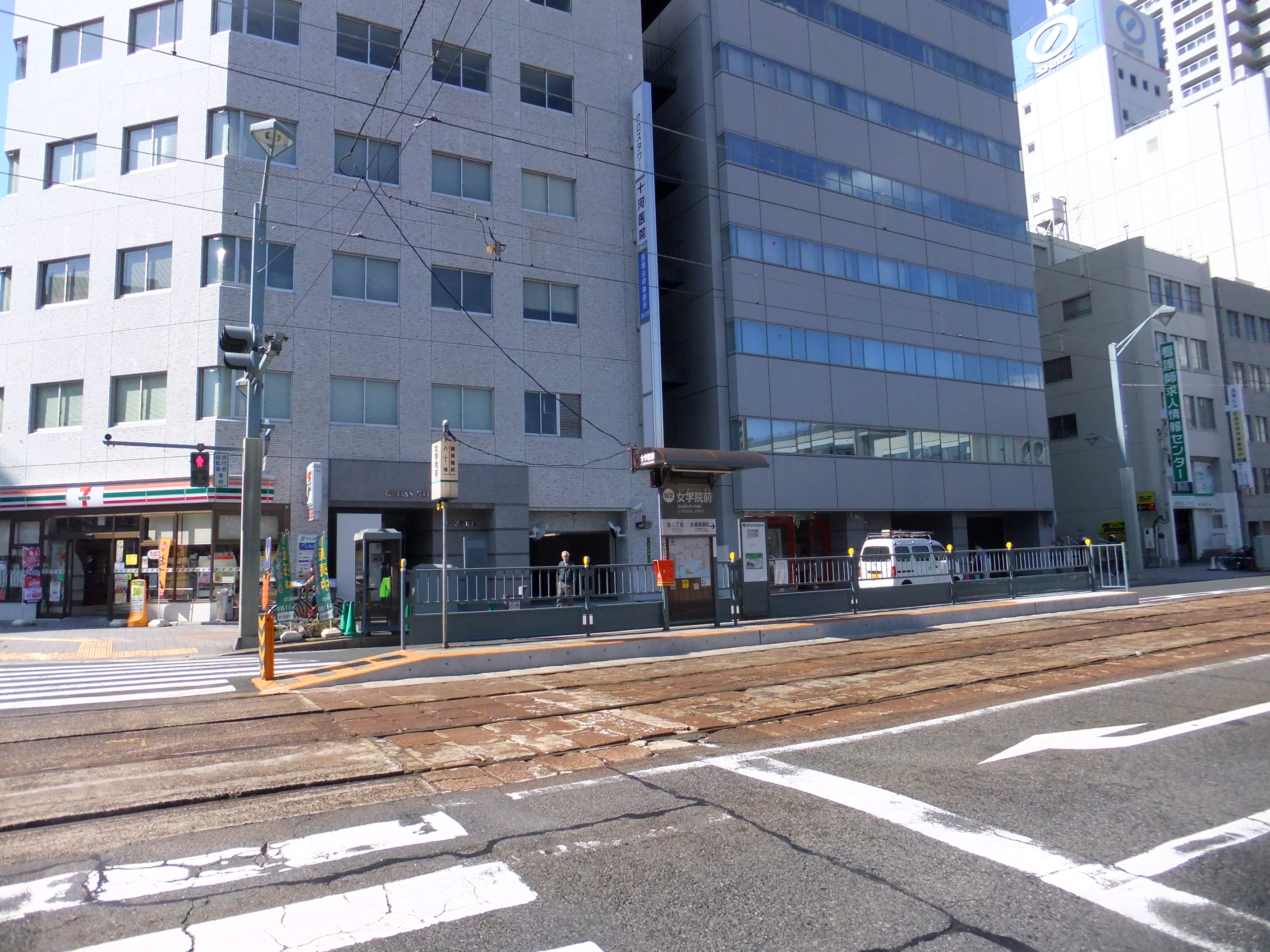

General information
- Location: Kami-hatchobori, Naka-ku, Hiroshima; Japan
- Coordinates: 34.3980°N 132.4648°E
- Operator: Hiroshima Electric Railway
- Lines: Hiroden Hakushima Line; Route 9

Other information
- Station code: W01

History
- Opened: November 23, 1912
Location

Jogakuin-mae is a Hiroden station on the Hiroden Hakushima Line, located in Kami-hatchobori, Naka-ku, Hiroshima.

== Routes ==
There is one route that serves Shukkeien-mae Station:

- 9 Hakushima - Hatchobori Route

== Station layout ==
The station consists of two staggered side platforms serving two tracks. Crosswalks connect the platforms with the sidewalk. There is a small shelter located on the middle of each platform.

== Adjacent stations ==
| « | Service | » |
Hiroden Hakushima Line
| Hatchobori | Route 9 | Shukkeien-mae |

== Surrounding area ==
- Hiroshima Jogakuin Junior & Senior High School
- Hiroshima Goudou Chousha

== History ==
- Opened on November 23, 1912.

== See also ==
- Hiroden lines and routes
