= Warrior by a Tomb =

1838 painting by Eugène Delacroix

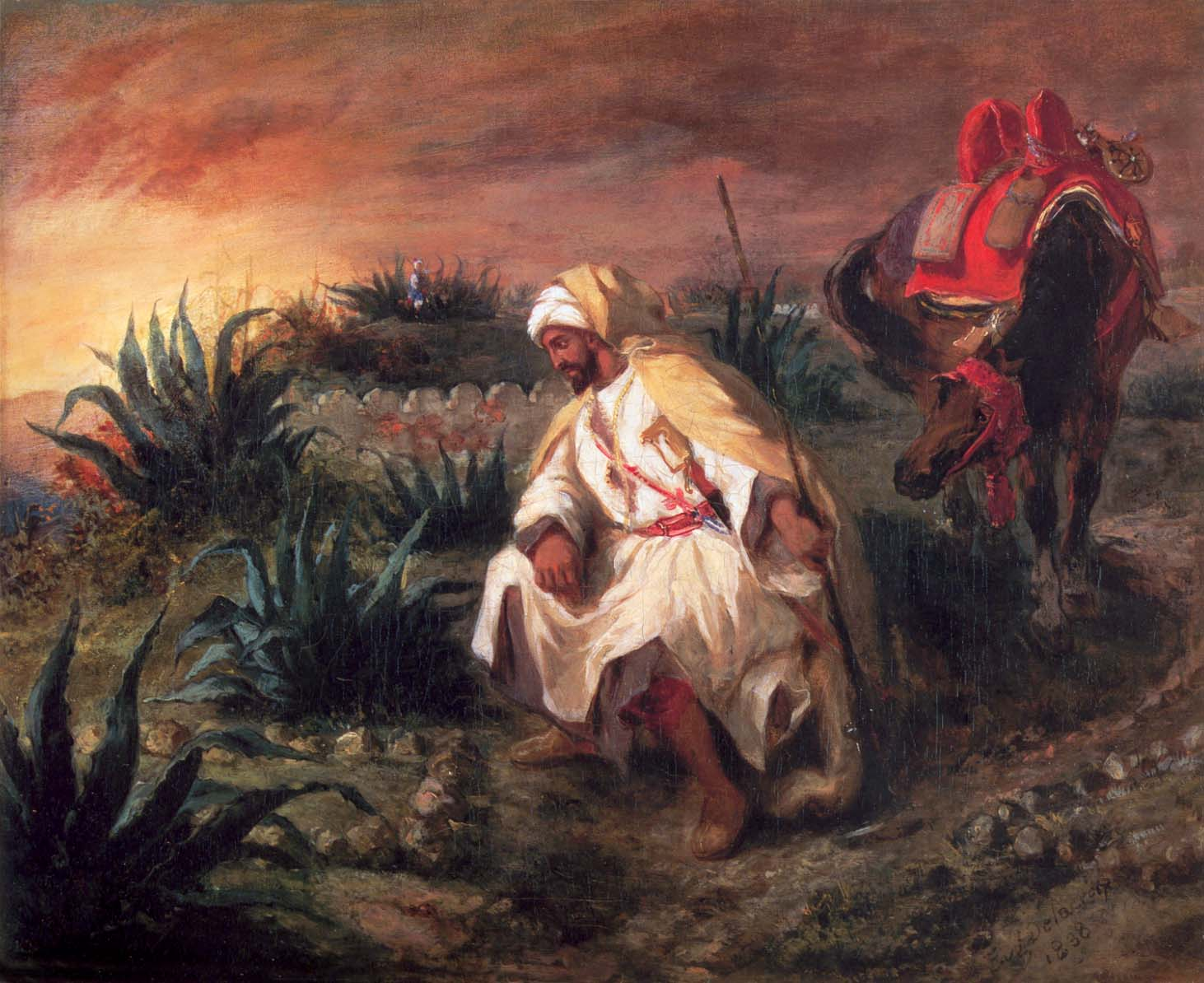
Warrior by a Tomb (1838) by Eugène Delacroix

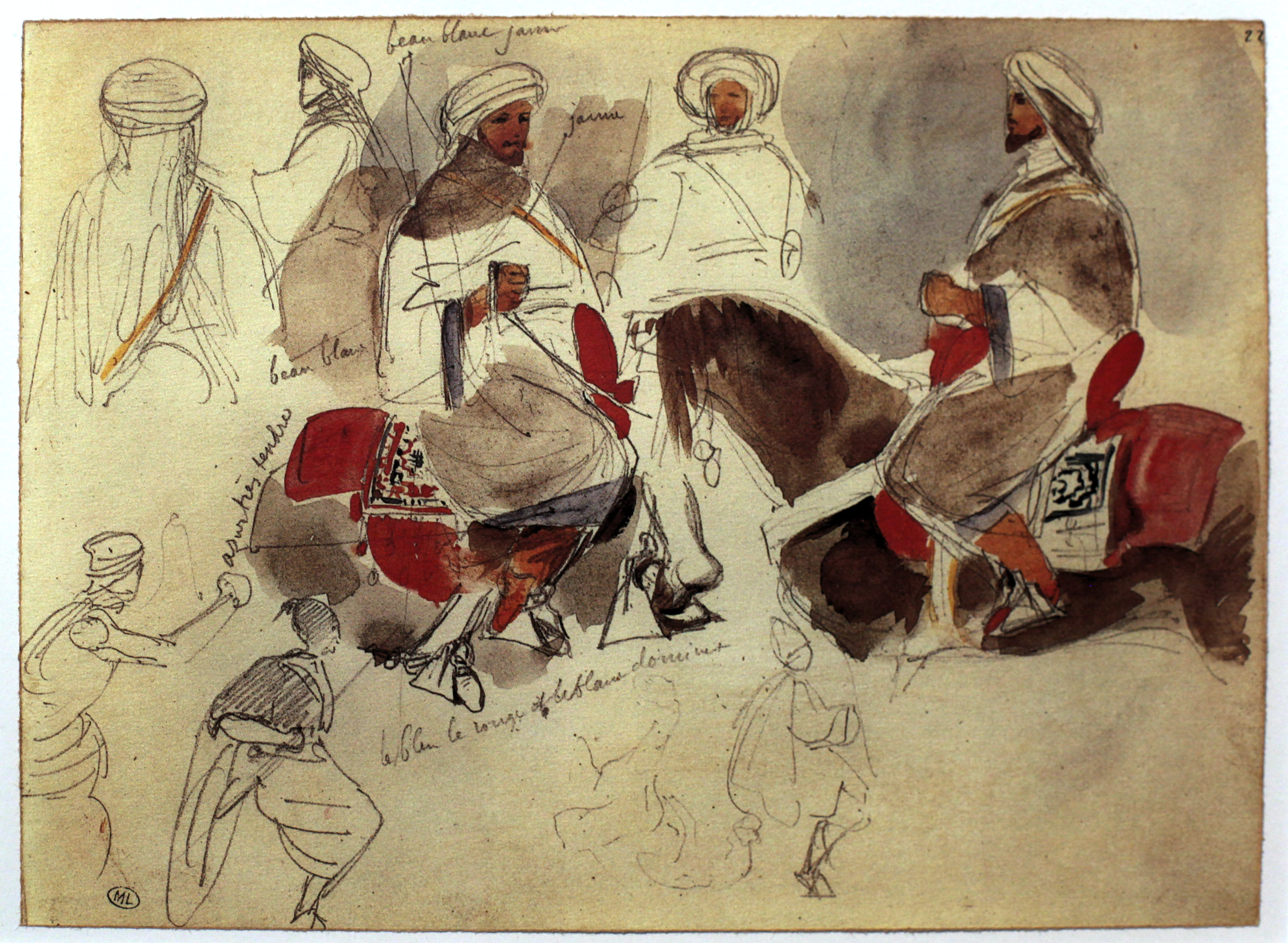
Sketch of Moroccan horsemen from Eugène Delacroix's travel sketchbook.

Warrior by a Tomb, Arab by a Tomb or The Arab by the Tomb is an 1838 oil-on-canvas painting by the French artist Eugène Delacroix, now in the Hiroshima Museum of Art. It was inspired by his trip to Morocco in 1831 as an official painter. The painting was refused by the jury of the Paris Salon of 1838. It is currently displayed in the Hiroshima Museum of Art in Hiroshima, Japan.
