= Katei Saibansho-mae Station =

Tram stop in Hiroshima, Japan

Katei Saibansho-mae 家庭裁判所前
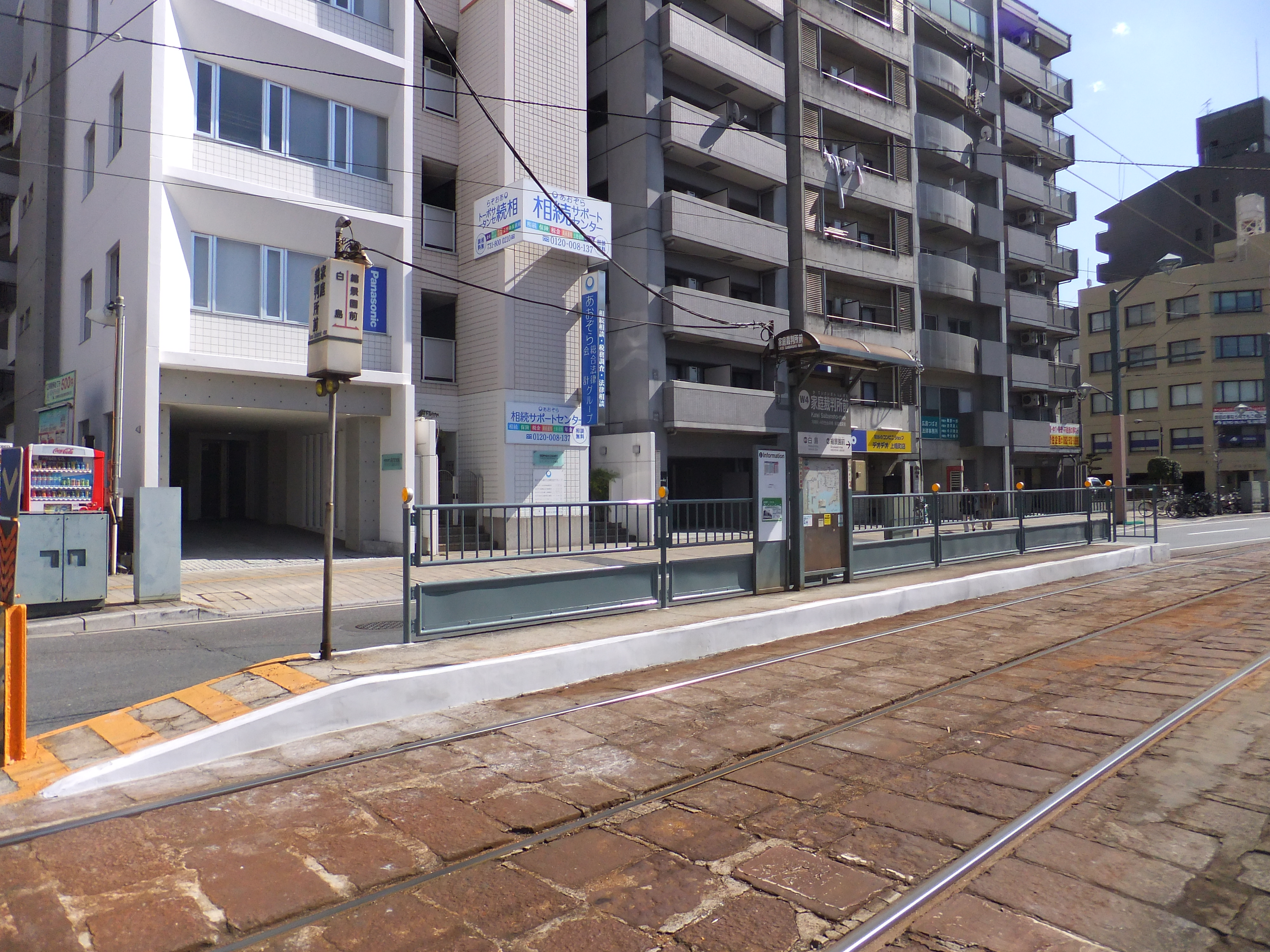

General information
- Location: Kami-hatchobori, Naka-ku, Hiroshima; Japan
- Coordinates: 34.4021°N 132.4662°E
- Operator: Hiroshima Electric Railway
- Lines: Hiroden Hakushima Line; Route 9
- Platforms: 2 side platforms

Other information
- Station code: W03

History
- Opened: November 23, 1912
Location

Katei Saibansho-mae is a Hiroden station on the Hiroden Hakushima Line, located in Kami-hatchobori, Naka-ku, Hiroshima. The station is located in front of the Hiroshima Family Court, and is operated by the Hiroshima Electric Railway.

== Routes ==
There is one route that serves Katei Saibansho-mae Station:

- 9 Hakushima - Hatchobori Route

== Station layout ==
The station consists of two side platforms serving two tracks. A crosswalk connects the platforms with the sidewalk. There is a small shelter located on the middle of each platform.

== Adjacent stations ==
«	Service	»
Hiroden Hakushima Line
Shukkeien-mae	Route 9	Hakushima

== Surrounding area ==
- Hiroshima Family Court
- Hiroshima Detention Center

== History ==
- Opened on June 10, 1952

== See also ==
- Hiroden lines and routes
