= Hiroshima Prefectural Art Museum =

Museum in Hiroshima, Japan

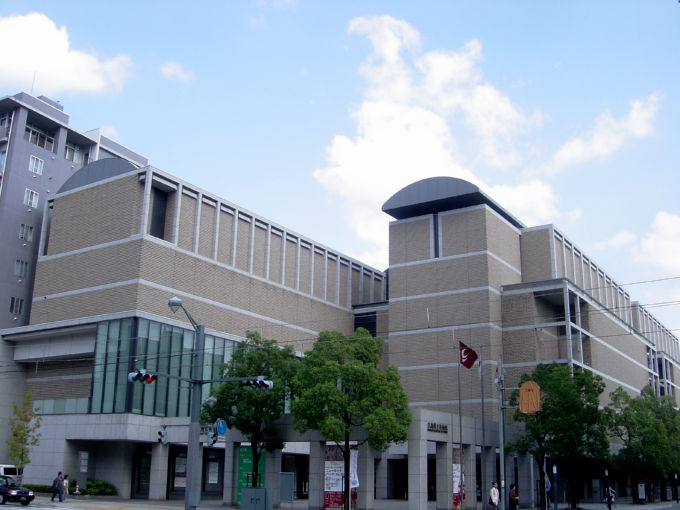
- Established: 1968 (reconstructed 1996)
- Location: 2-22 Kaminobori-cho, Naka-ku, Hiroshima
- Coordinates: 34.399909°N 132.466275°E
- Website: www.hpam.jp

The Hiroshima Prefectural Art Museum (広島県立美術館, Hiroshima Kenritsu Bijutsukan) is an art museum founded in 1968. It was reconstructed in 1996. It is located near Shukkei-en in Hiroshima, Japan.

== Access ==
- Hiroden Shukkeien-mae Station
- JR Hiroshima Station
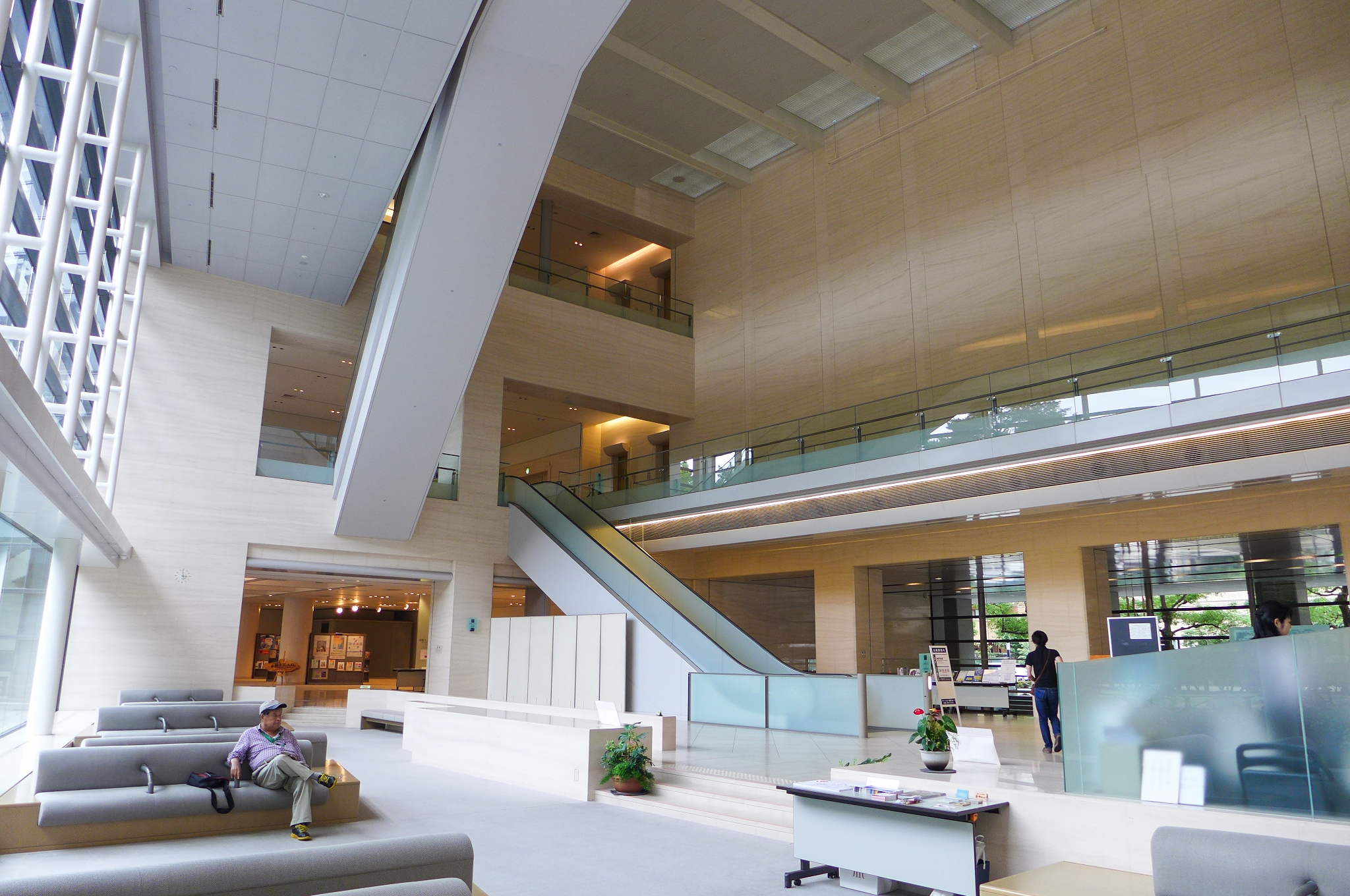
Atrium of the museum

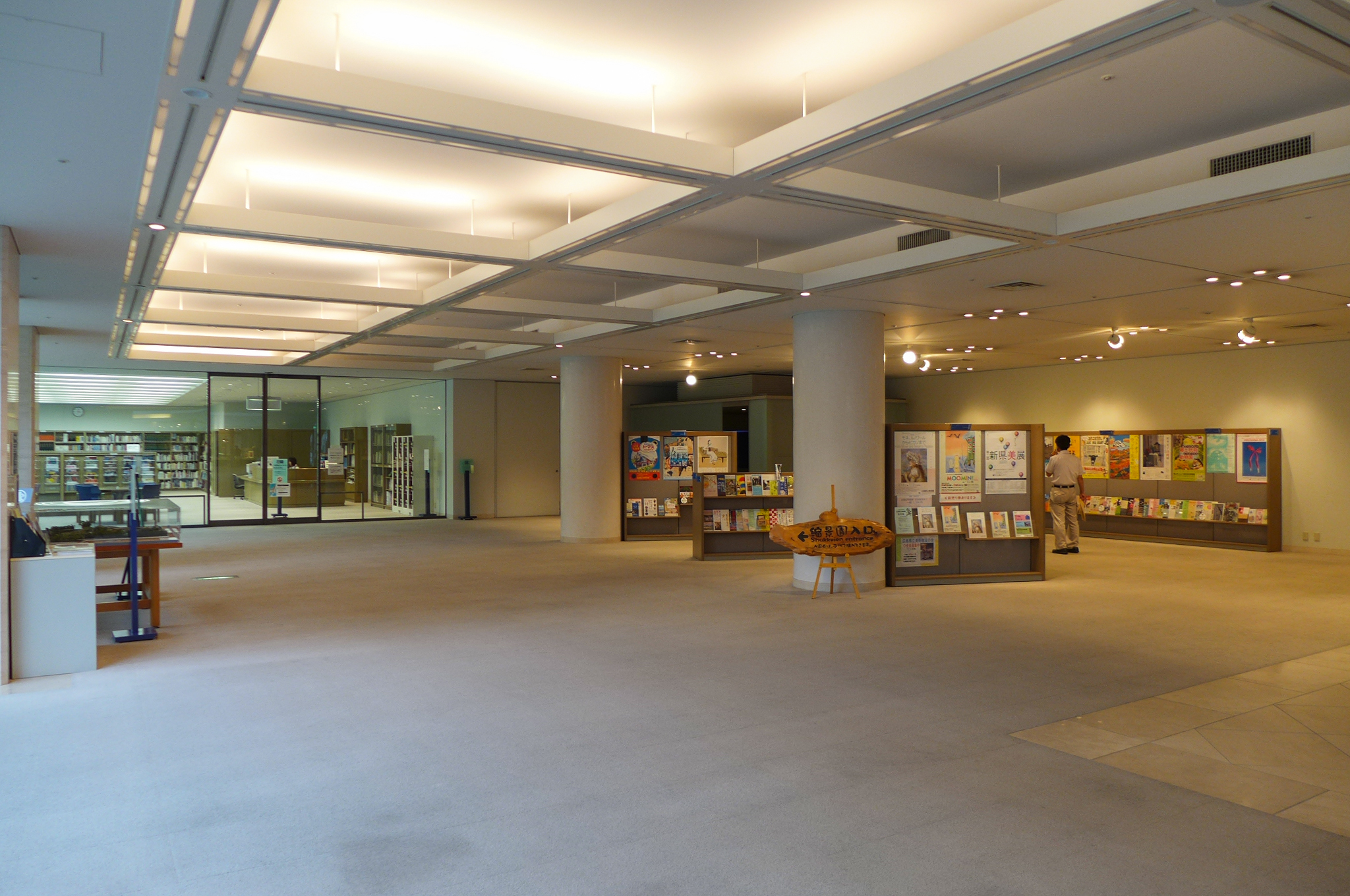
Lobby of the museum

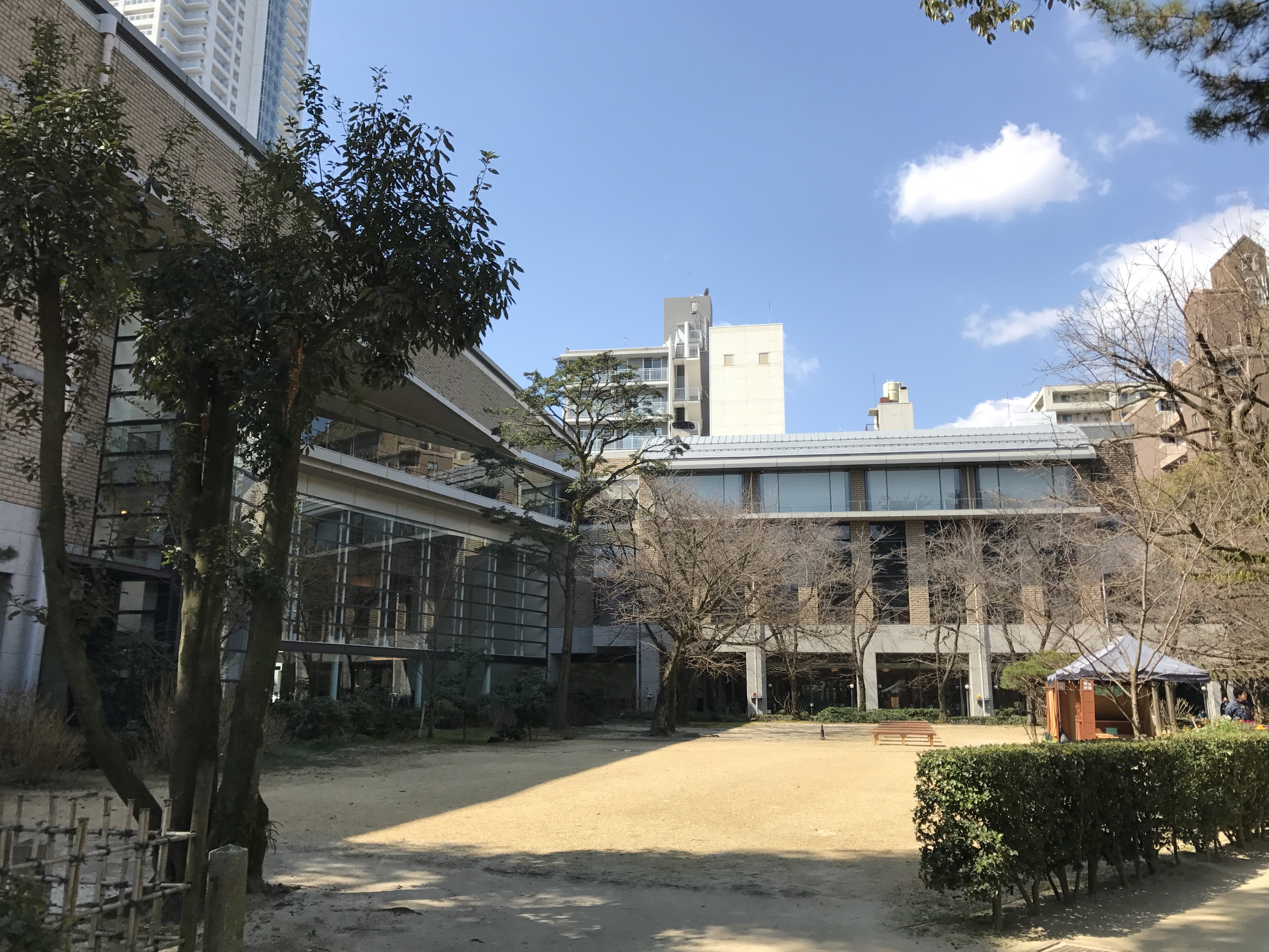
View from Shukkei Garden

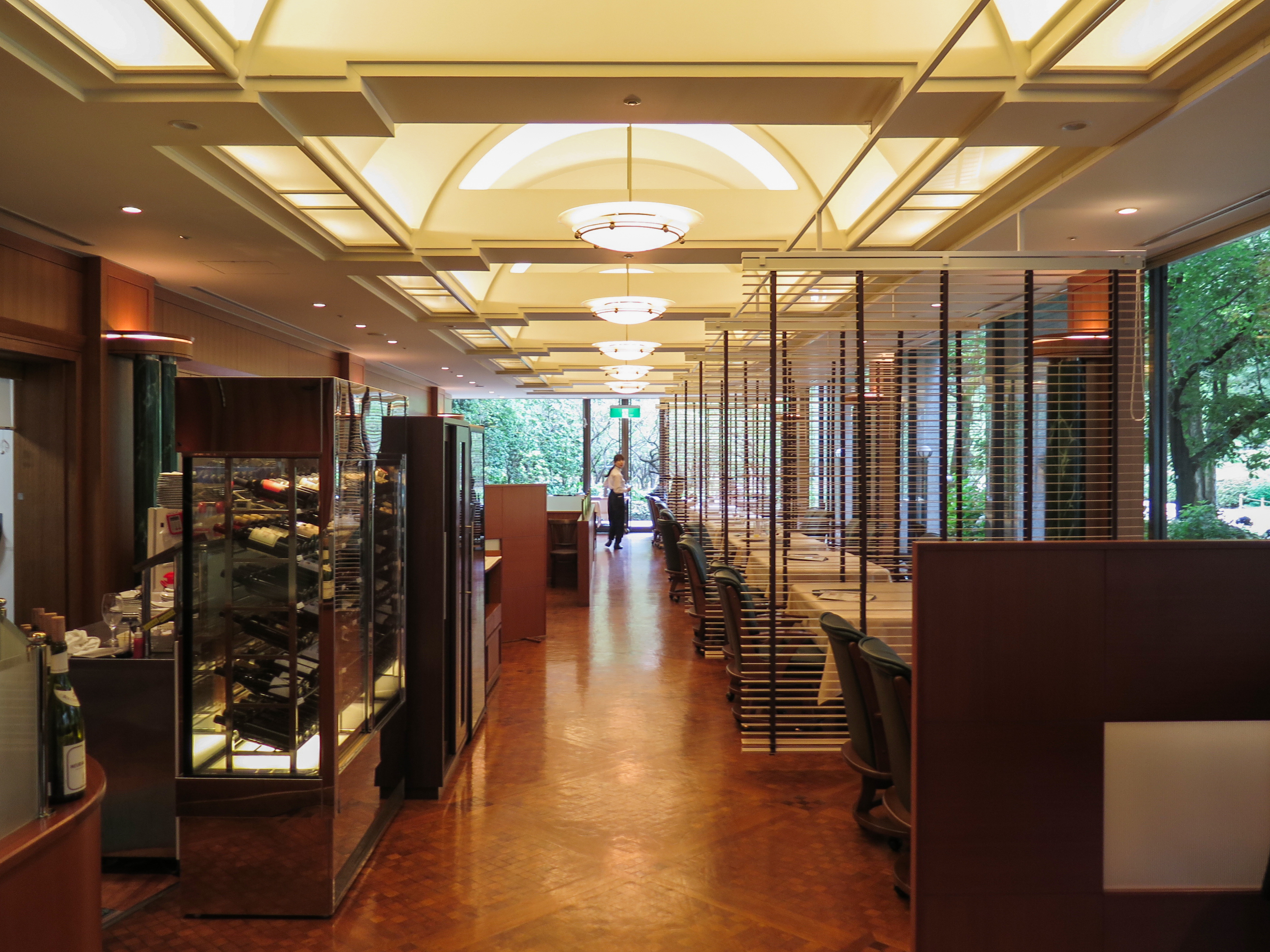
Zona ITALIA in Centro Restaurant

== See also ==
- Hiroshima Museum of Art
- Hiroshima City Museum of Contemporary Art
- Shukkei-en
