= Kunzo Minami =

Japanese painter

- Born: 21 July 1883; Hiroshima, Japan
- Died: 6 January 1950 (aged 66); Hiroshima, Japan
- Occupation: Painter

Kunzo Minami (南 薫造, Minami Kunzō; 21 July 1883 – 6 January 1950) was a Japanese painter. His work was part of the painting event in the art competition at the 1932 Summer Olympics.
