= Yasuo Kazuki =

Japanese artist (1911–1974)

- Born: October 25, 1911; Misumi, Yamaguchi Prefecture
- Died: March 8, 1974 (aged 62)
- Known for: Painter
- Notable work: Siberian Series
- Style: Western-Style painting

Yasuo Kazuki (Japanese: 香月泰男, October 25, 1911 – 8 March 1974) was a Japanese artist known for his paintings depicting life as a prisoner of war in Siberia. This set of paintings, known as the Siberian Series, was derived from his experiences in concentration camps after being taken as a prisoner of war in 1945 following World War II. After returning to Japan, he continued to paint until his death at age 62.

== Biography ==
=== Early life ===
Kazuki was born in 1911 in the town of Misumi (三隅町) in Yamaguchi prefecture (山口県). Kazuki’s father trained as a dentist, despite generations of his family working as herb doctors. After ruining himself by dissipation, Kazuki’s father moved to Korea and remained there until his death. Kazuki’s mother had left the year prior to this when Kazuki was aged 9, leaving Kazuki with his grandparents and uncle. According to Kazuki, painting was his salvation from loneliness after abandonment by both parents.

=== Education ===
Kazuki attended the Kawabata Painting School between 1929 and 1931, then the Tokyo Art school (now called Tokyo University of the Arts (東京藝術大学)) between 1931 and 1936. After graduating, Kazuki spent time in Hokkaido as a teacher. He later returned to Yamaguchi where he married and had three children (two daughters and a son). While teaching, he continued to paint and became highly acclaimed by the art community, receiving two major art prizes in the late 1930s.

=== World War II ===
Kazuki was drafted into the military in 1943. After three months of training in Yamaguchi, he was sent to Manchuria as a corporal in Japan’s Kwantung Army where he was responsible for repairing military equipment. He took his painting materials with him in an attempt to retain his identity as a painter, viewing himself as living in a different world to the other soldiers.

When the war ended in 1945, Kazuki was in Mukden (now called Shenyang) in China. Kazuki and his comrades were taken to a concentration camp in Siberia, where they were forced to generate thermal power through logging. For each comrade who died in the concentration camp, Kazuki sketched a death mask on paper to give to the bereaved families of the deceased. However, these sketches were burned by those in charge.

In May 1946, Kazuki was transferred to another gulag in Chernogorsk. He was reportedly astonished by the difference between the two concentration camps, with the conditions at this camp being much better than the last. Originally, Kazuki was supposed to mine coal, but upon discovering he was a painter, those in charge made him plaster walls. The following year, in May 1947, Kazuki was released to Japan. He depicted his feelings of returning home in a painting called Demobilization: ‘Gangway’ Ladder (1967), in which, he aimed to depict the feeling of carrying the ghosts of his comrades home.

=== Late life ===
In 1947, Kazuki resumed teaching in Misumi. He travelled to Europe for the first time in 1956 and continued to travel and paint after his retirement from teaching in 1960. He also published a poetry collection, created toys and lithograph art books, and featured on NHK’s radio and TV programmes.

Kazuki had been experiencing severe heart problems for a number of years. Following his eldest daughter's death from cancer in 1971, his heart problems worsened due to increased alcohol consumption. Despite being told to stop painting the Siberian Series for the sake of his health, he continued, remarking that he would rather die than stop painting. He died in 1974 aged 62 from a myocardial infarction.

== Art career ==
Interested in art from a young age, Kazuki transitioned from creating watercolour paintings to oil paintings and was inspired by the works of Vincent van Gogh and Maurice de Vlaminck. Under the tutelage of Tajeki Fujishima at the Tokyo Art School, Kazuki studied Western-style painting. His later work was a fusion between Western and Japanese styles, using Western materials and Japanese motifs.

Kazuki joined the National Painting Society (Kokugakai) in 1940 after presenting his painting at the ninth group exhibition of the Kokugakai in 1934. He remained in the society until 1961, regularly exhibiting his paintings. He later achieved international recognition for his paintings, leading him to travel extensively to exhibit his works. In 1969, his Siberian Series received the Japan Art Grand Award from the Shincho Arts Foundation.

=== Siberian Series ===
Kazuki’s Siberian Series (as termed by Yasui Yūichirō) consists of 57 works created between 1947-1974 depicting his personal experiences as a Siberian prisoner of war. The first painting was Rain: Cattle (1947), which pictured a grassy plain in Hulunbuir, China. The second painting was of his painful memories of the gulag, titled Burial (1948), depicting a dead body with its face covered with a white cloth. According to Kazuki, it represented the burials of his comrades in the mountainside. After this piece, there was an 8-year gap before Kazuki’s next painting in the Siberian Series.

During this 8-year period, Kazuki developed a new painting style through trial-and-error that he later named his Siberian Style, involving application of yellow ochre as a foundation, then layering paint mixed with a mineral pigment called calcite. Kazuki then painted over this in black, applied charcoal powders, then paint-spread it with a knife. It is thought that the method mirrors his experiences in Siberia as a plasterer and in mixing oil and soot. His pieces became simpler and more abstract, with the colours black and yellow ochre being used the most.

When expressing himself, Kazuki used three methods: his paintings, his narratives associated with each painting (for works created after 1967), and his book titled The Siberia Within Me (私のシベリヤ). The Siberia Within Me was published by Bungei Shunjū in 1970 and explored Kazuki’s early life, artistic career and military exploits, with an emphasis on the Siberian Series. Each piece from the series was paired with a vignette of self-reflection. Though originally listed as written by Kazuki, it transpired 15 years after its publication that The Siberia Within Me was written as a collaboration between Kazuki and his close friend Takashi Tachibana.

Kazuki continued to paint the Siberian Series until his death in 1974; his final pieces were titled Sunrise and Moonrise. Many of his works were donated to Yamaguchi Prefecture and stored at the Yamaguchi Prefectural Museum, including 45 works from his Siberian Series.

== Famous works ==
- Rain: Cattle (雨:牛) (1947)
- Burial (埋葬) (1948)
- 1945 (1959)
- Nirvana (涅槃) (1960)
- Myself 'Makhorka' (私〈マホルカ〉) (1966)
- Demobilization: 'Gangway' Ladder (復員〈タラップ〉) (1967)
- My Earth (〈私の〉地球) (1968)
- Blue Sun (青の太陽) (1969)
- Beach 'Nakhodka' (渚〈ナホトカ〉) (1974)
- Sunrise (日の出) (1974)
- Moonrise (月の出) (1974)
