= Kinosuke Ebihara =

Japanese painter

- 海老原 喜之助 (Ebihara Kinosuke)
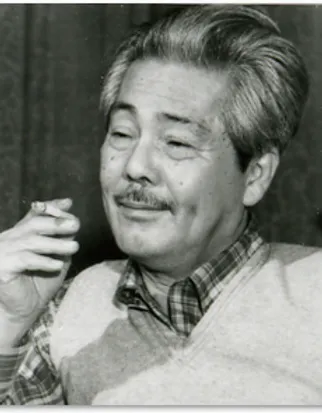
- Born: 13 September 1904; Kagoshima, Kagoshima Prefecture, Japan
- Died: 19 September 1970 (aged 66); Paris, France
- Occupation: Painter

Kinosuke Ebihara (海老原 喜之助, Ebihara Kinosuke; 13 September 1904 – 19 September 1970) was a Japanese painter. His work was part of the painting event in the art competition at the 1936 Summer Olympics.
