= Ushita Station =

Railway station in Hiroshima, Japan

Ushita 牛田駅
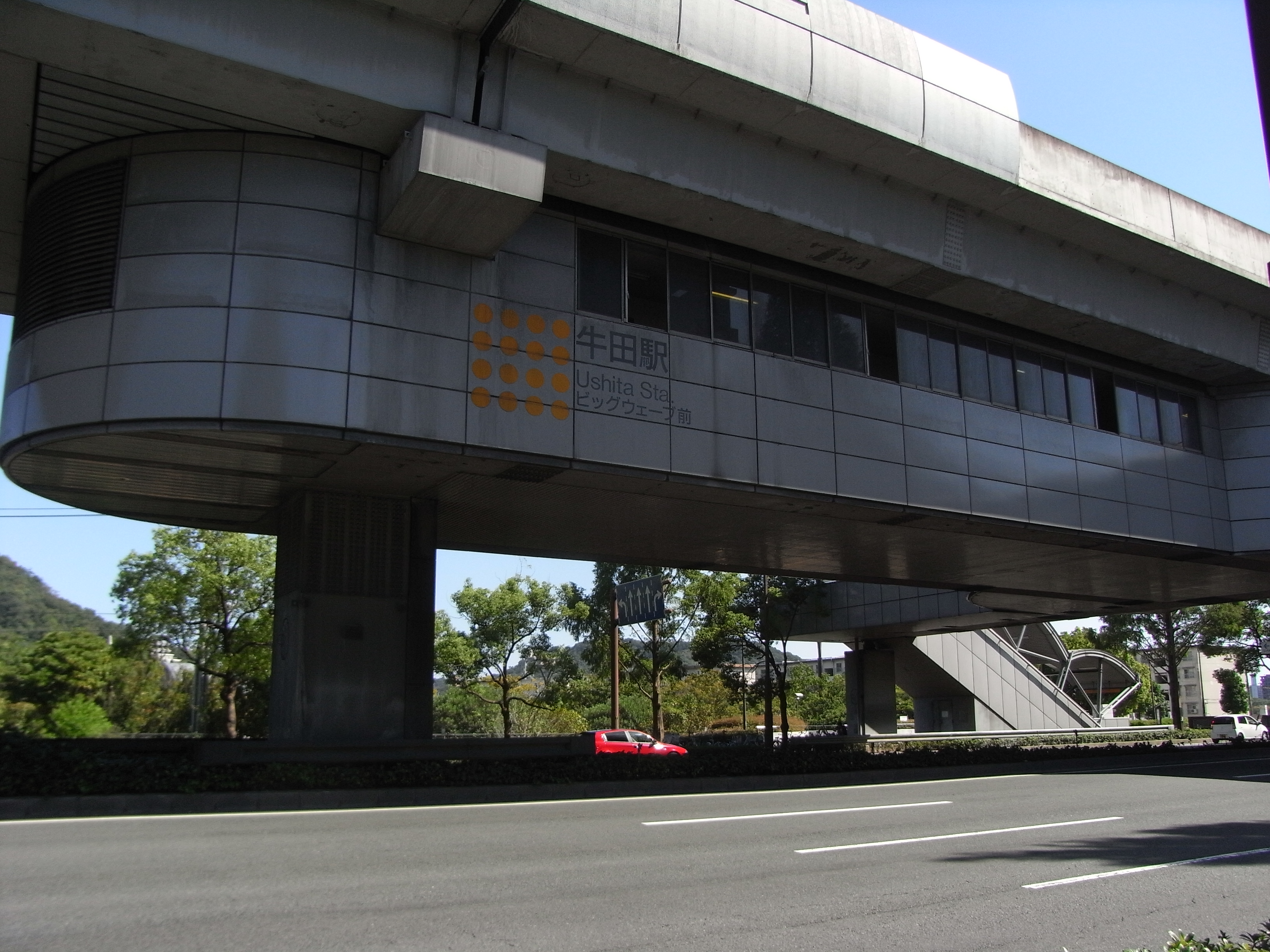
- Astram Ushita Station

General information
- Location: 2-4-44, Ushita-shinmachi, Naka-ku, Hiroshima; Japan
- Coordinates: 34°25′03″N 132°27′53″E
- Line: Astram Line
- Platforms: 1 island platform
- Tracks: 2

Construction
- Structure type: Elevated station

History
- Opened: 20 August 1994; 31 years ago

Services
Preceding station	Hiroshima Rapid Transit	Following station
Hakushima towards Hondōri	Astram Line	Fudōin-mae towards Kōiki-kōen-mae
Location
- Location within Hiroshima Prefecture Location within Japan

== Platforms ==
1	█	for Kōiki-kōen-mae
2	█	for Hondōri

== Around station ==
- Hiroshima Bigwave
- Hiroshima City Higashi Ward Sports Center

== History ==
- Opened on August 20, 1994.

== See also ==
- Astram Line
- Hiroshima Rapid Transit
