= Hakushima Station (Hiroden) =

Tram stop in Hiroshima, Japan

Hakushima 白島
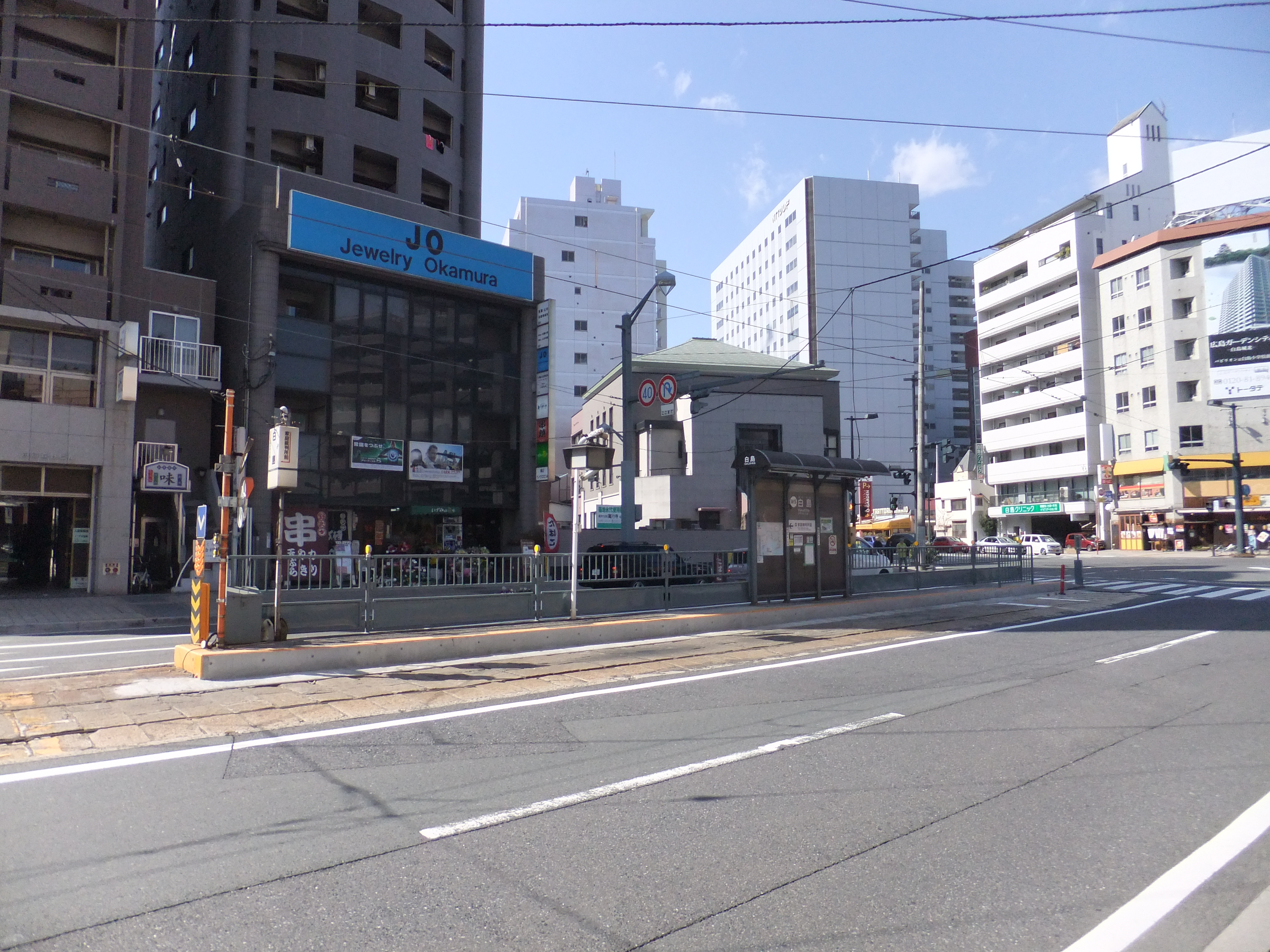

General information
- Location: Higashi-hakushima, Naka-ku, Hiroshima; Japan
- Coordinates: 34.404144°N 132.46556°E
- Operator: Hiroshima Electric Railway
- Lines: Hiroden Hakushima Line; Route 9
- Platforms: 1 side platform

Other information
- Station code: W04

History
- Opened: November 23, 1912
Location

Hiroden Hakushima Station is a Hiroden terminal station on the Hiroden Hakushima Line, located in Higashi-hakushima, Naka-ku, Hiroshima. The station is operated by the Hiroshima Electric Railway.

== Routes ==
There is one route that serves Hakushima Station:

- 9 Hakushima - Hatchobori Route

== Station layout ==
The station consists of one side platform serving one track. A crosswalk connects the platform with the sidewalk. There is a small shelter located on the middle of the platform. The track ends immediately at the end of the platform; there is no buffer stop.

== Adjacent stations ==
«	Service	»
Hiroden Hakushima Line
Katei Saibansho-mae	Route 9	Terminus

== Surrounding area ==
- Astram Line Hakushima Station (1 km away)
- Hiroshima Teishin Hospital

== History ==
- Opened on the Main Line on November 23, 1912.
- Closed due to the atomic bomb on August 6, 1945.
- Moved and renamed to "Hakushima-syuten" on June 10, 1952.
- Renamed to "Hakushima" on March 30, 1960.

== See also ==
- Hiroden lines and routes
