= Heizo Kanayama =

Japanese painter

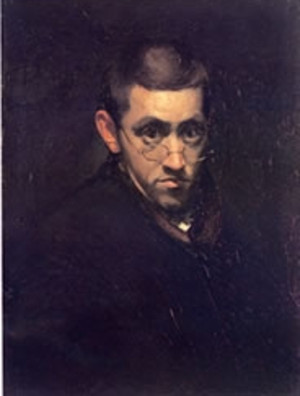
- Born: 18 December 1883; Kobe, Japan
- Died: 15 July 1964 (aged 80); Toshima, Japan
- Occupation: Painter

Heizo Kanayama (金山 平三, Kanayama Heizō; 18 December 1883 – 15 July 1964) was a Japanese painter. His work was part of the painting event in the art competition at the 1932 Summer Olympics.

== Biography ==
Kanayama was born in 1883, in Kobe. He studied painting at Tokyo University of the Arts, with further studies in Paris from 1912 to 1915. He was best known for his Western-style landscapes in oils, especially of scenes in the Tohoku region. Work by Kanayama was included in the Exhibition of the Imperial Academy of Art in 1928. In 1932 he competed as an artist at the Summer Olympics in Los Angeles. He died in 1964, in Toshima, Tokyo.

== Legacy ==
Kawasaki held 138 of Kanayama's works, and donated most of those to the Hyogo Prefectural Museum of Art, where they are part of the permanent exhibit. The Hiroshima Museum of Art has several Kanayama paintings. In 1987 his work was part of Paris in Japan, an exhibit at the Washington University Art Gallery in St. Louis. His painting "Morning in Seoul" was auctioned at Christie's in 1999.
