= Hakushima Station (Astram Line) =

Railway station in Hiroshima, Hiroshima prefecture, Japan

Hakushima Station 白島駅
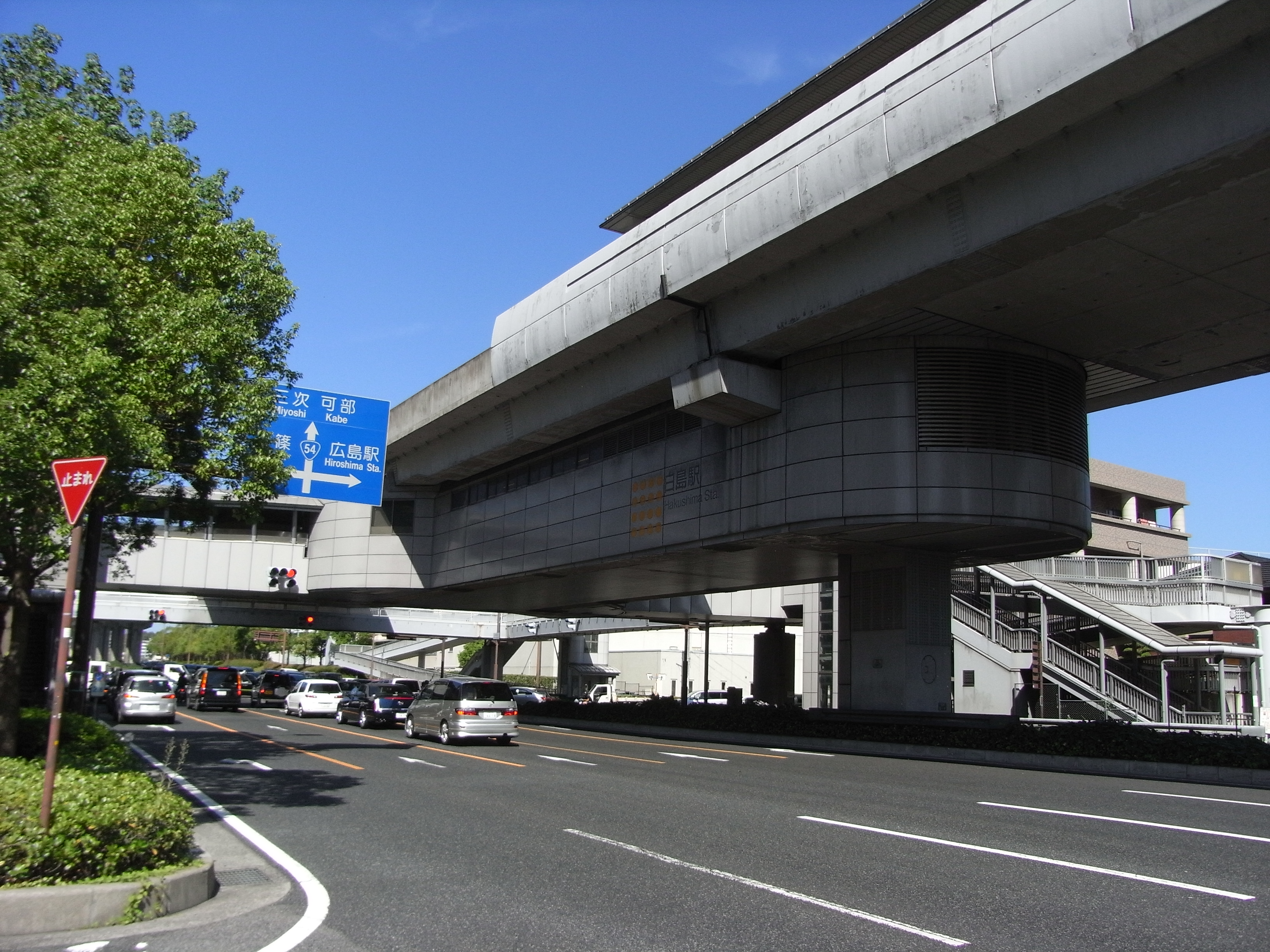
- Hakushima Station

General information
- Location: 18-20, Hakushima-kitamachi, Naka-ku, Hiroshima; Japan
- Coordinates: 34°24′40″N 132°27′46″E
- Line: Astram Line
- Platforms: 1 island platform
- Tracks: 2

Construction
- Structure type: elevated

History
- Opened: 20 August 1994; 31 years ago

Services
Preceding station	Hiroshima Rapid Transit	Following station
Shin-Hakushima towards Hondōri	Astram Line	Ushita towards Kōiki-kōen-mae
Location
- Location within Hiroshima Prefecture Location within Japan

Hakushima Station is a HRT station on Astram Line, located in 18–20, Hakushima-kitamachi, Naka-ku, Hiroshima.

== Platforms ==
1	█	for Kōiki-kōen-mae
2	█	for Hondōri

== Connections ==
█ Astram Line
Shin-Hakushima — ●Hakushima — ●Ushita

== Around station ==
- Hiroshima Home TV
- Sotoku High School
- Sotoku Junior High School
- Yasuda Girl's High School
- Yasuda Girl's Junior High School
- Yasuda Elementary School

== History ==
- Opened on August 20, 1994.

== See also ==
- Astram Line
- Hiroshima Rapid Transit
