= Kamiya-cho-higashi Station =

Tram stop in Hiroshima, Japan

Coordinates: 34°23′42″N 132°27′30″E

Kamiya-chō-higashi 紙屋町東
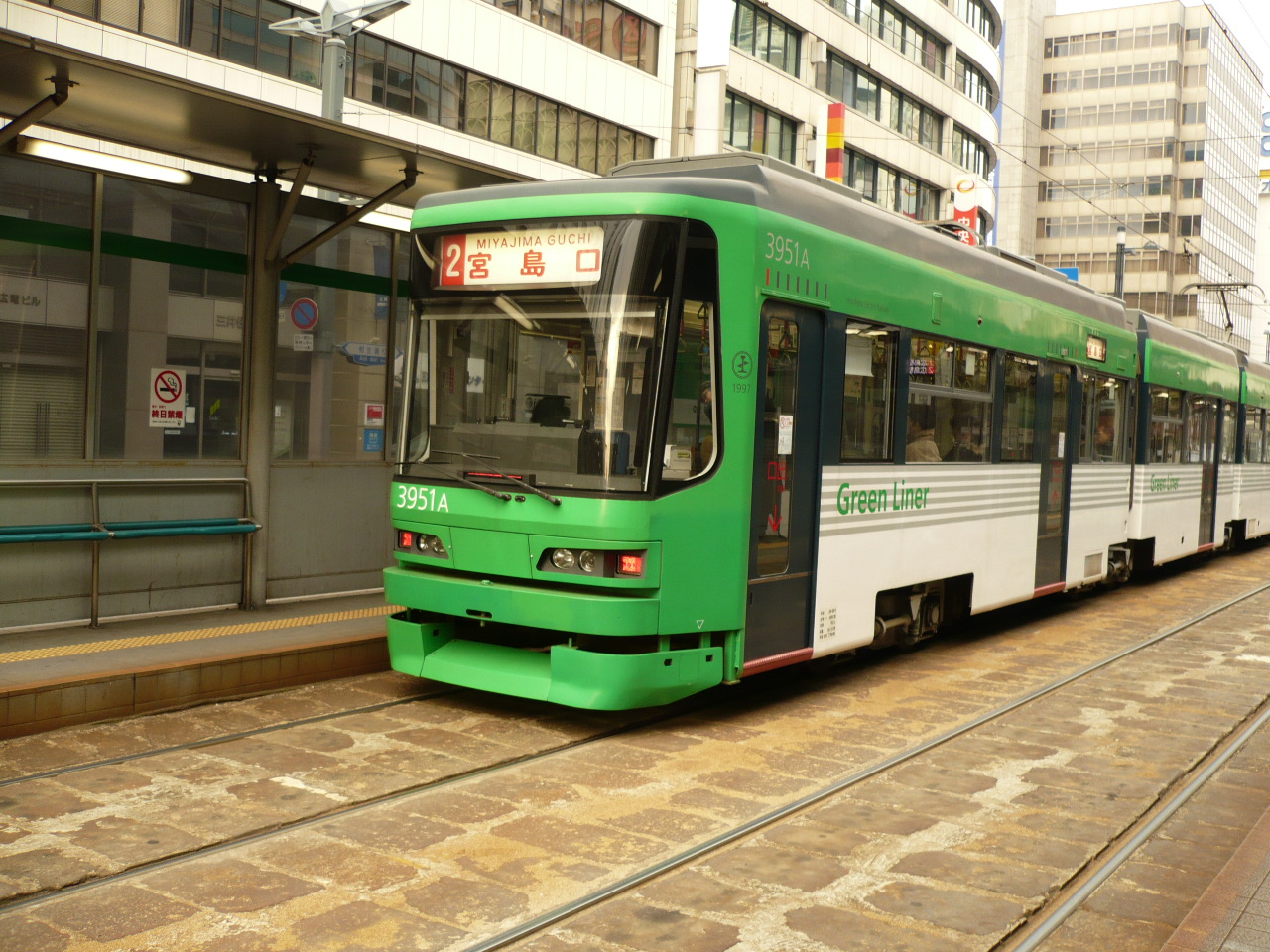

General information
- Location: Kamiya-chō 1-chōme, Naka-ku, Hiroshima; Japan
- Operator: Hiroshima Electric Railway
- Lines: █ Hiroden Main Line █ Hiroden Ujina Line; Route
- Connections: █ Astram Line at Hondōri Station and Kenchō-mae Station; Bus Routes at Hiroshima Bus Center

Other information
- Station code: M07

History
- Opened: November 23, 1912
Location

Kamiya-chō-higashi is a Hiroden station (tram stop) on Hiroden Main Line and Hiroden Ujina Line, located in Kamiya-chō 1-chōme, Naka-ku, Hiroshima, Japan. To the station take underground pass through Kamiya-chō Shareo.

== Routes ==
From Kamiya-chō-higashi Station, there are three of Hiroden Streetcar routes.

- Hiroshima Station - Hiroshima Port Route
- Hiroshima Station - Hiroden-miyajima-guchi Route
- Hiroshima Station - Eba Route

== Connections ==
█ Main Line / █ Ujina Line

Tate-machi — Kamiya-chō-higashi — Hondōri

█ Main Line

Tate-machi — Kamiya-chō-higashi — Kamiya-chō-nishi

== Other services connections ==
█ Astram Line

- Astram Line Connections at Astram Hondōri Station
- Astram Line Connections at Astram Kenchō-mae Station

█ Bus Service Routes

- Bus Service Route Connections at Hiroshima Bus Center

== Around station ==
- Kamiya-chō Shareo
- Hiroshima Bus Center
- Sogo
- ALSOK Hall
- Hiroshima Peace Memorial
- Hiroshima Peace Memorial Park
- Hiroshima Municipal Stadium

== History ==
- Opened as "Kamiya-chō" on November 23, 1912.
- Rebuilt and renamed to "Kamiya-chō-higashi" on November 1, 2001.

== See also ==
- Hiroden lines and routes
- List of railway stations in Japan
