= Shukkei-en =

Park in Japan

Coordinates: 34°23′58″N 132°28′02″E

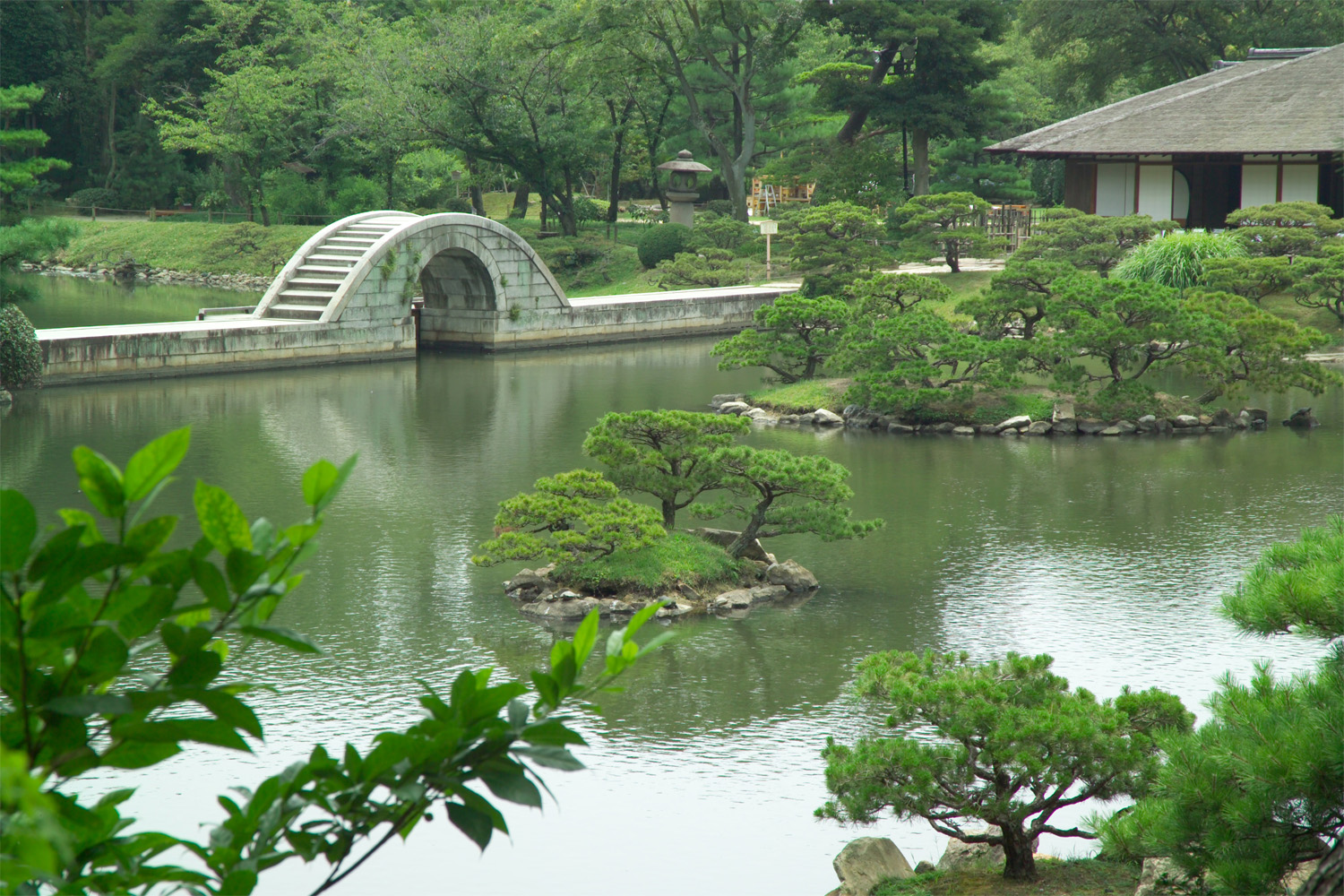
- Rainbow bridge in Shukkei-en

- Location within Japan
- Location: Hiroshima, Japan

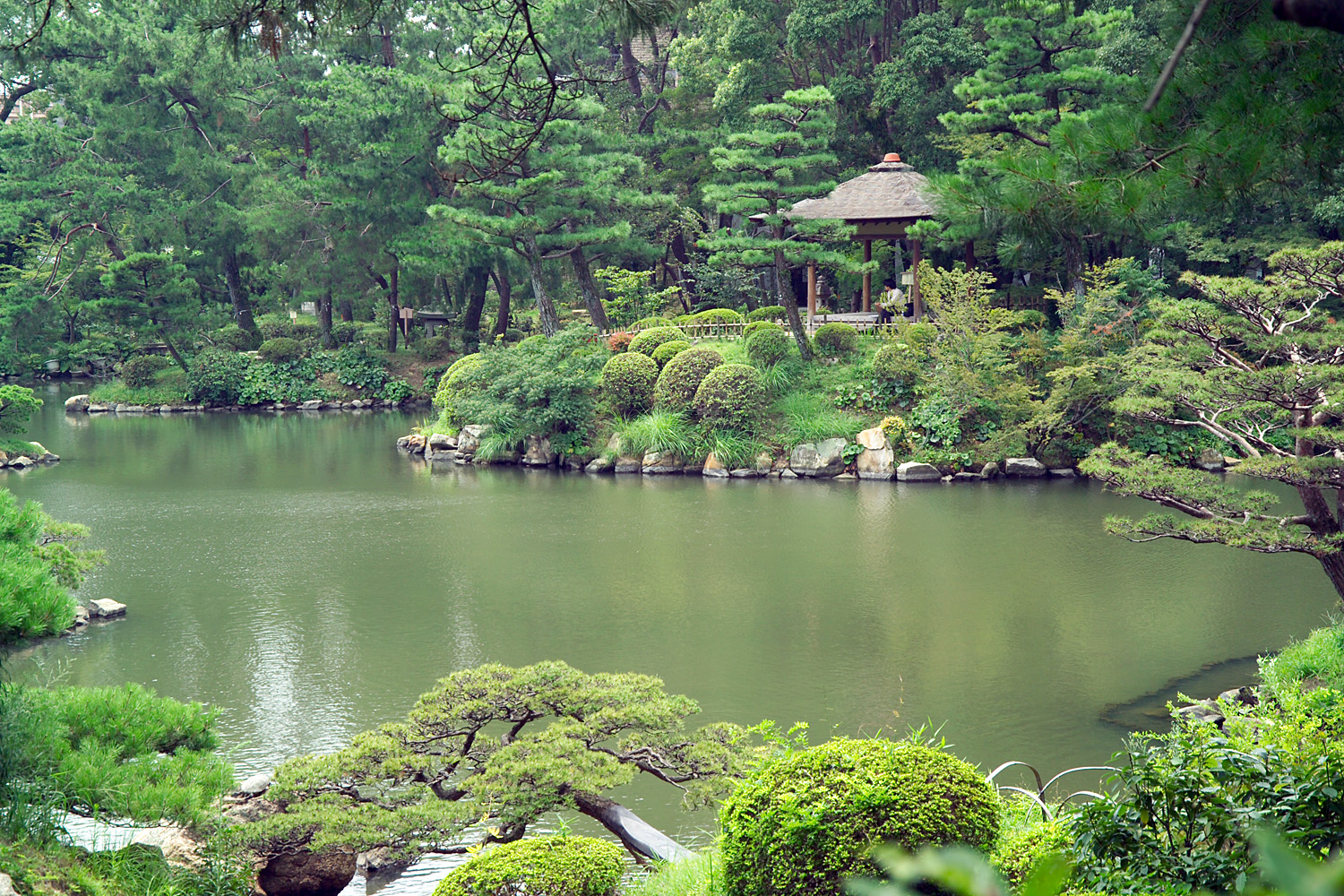
Pond

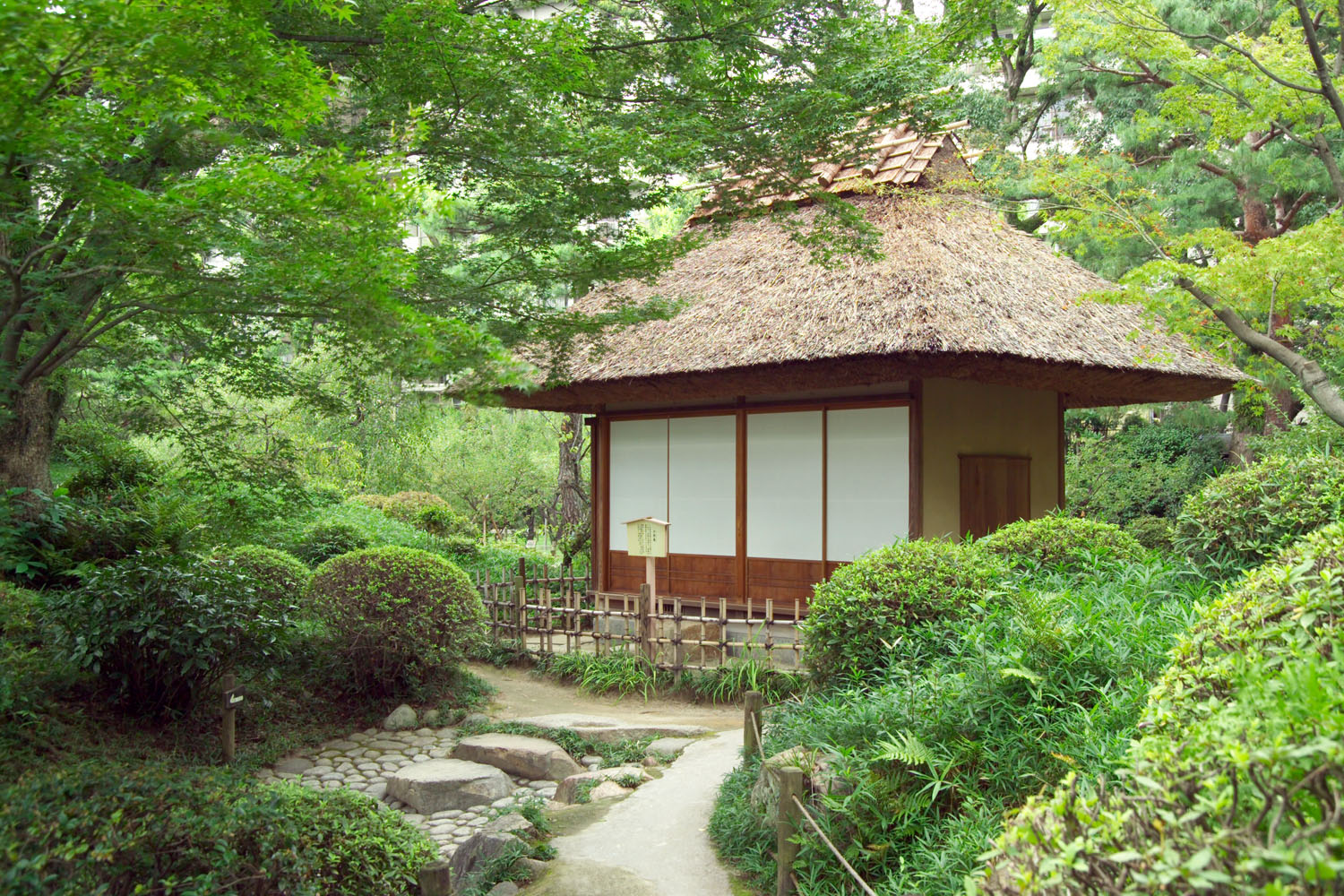
Pavilion

Shukkei-en (縮景園) is a historic Japanese garden in the city of Hiroshima, Japan. The Hiroshima Prefectural Art Museum is located adjacent to the garden.

== History ==
Construction began in 1620 during the Edo period at the order of Asano Nagaakira, daimyō of the Hiroshima han. Shukkei-en was constructed by Ueda Sōko, who served lord Asano as chief retainer (karō) of the domain and as a tea master.

Since the Meiji period, the garden served as the villa of the Asano family. When under Emperor Meiji the Imperial General Headquarters were relocated to Hiroshima, the emperor briefly lodged at the villa. The gardens were opened to the public, and in 1940 the Asano family donated them to Hiroshima Prefecture. Being a short walk from ground zero of the nuclear attack on Hiroshima, Shukkei-en suffered extensive damage, and then became a refuge for victims of the war. After renovations, it reopened in 1951.

== Gallery ==
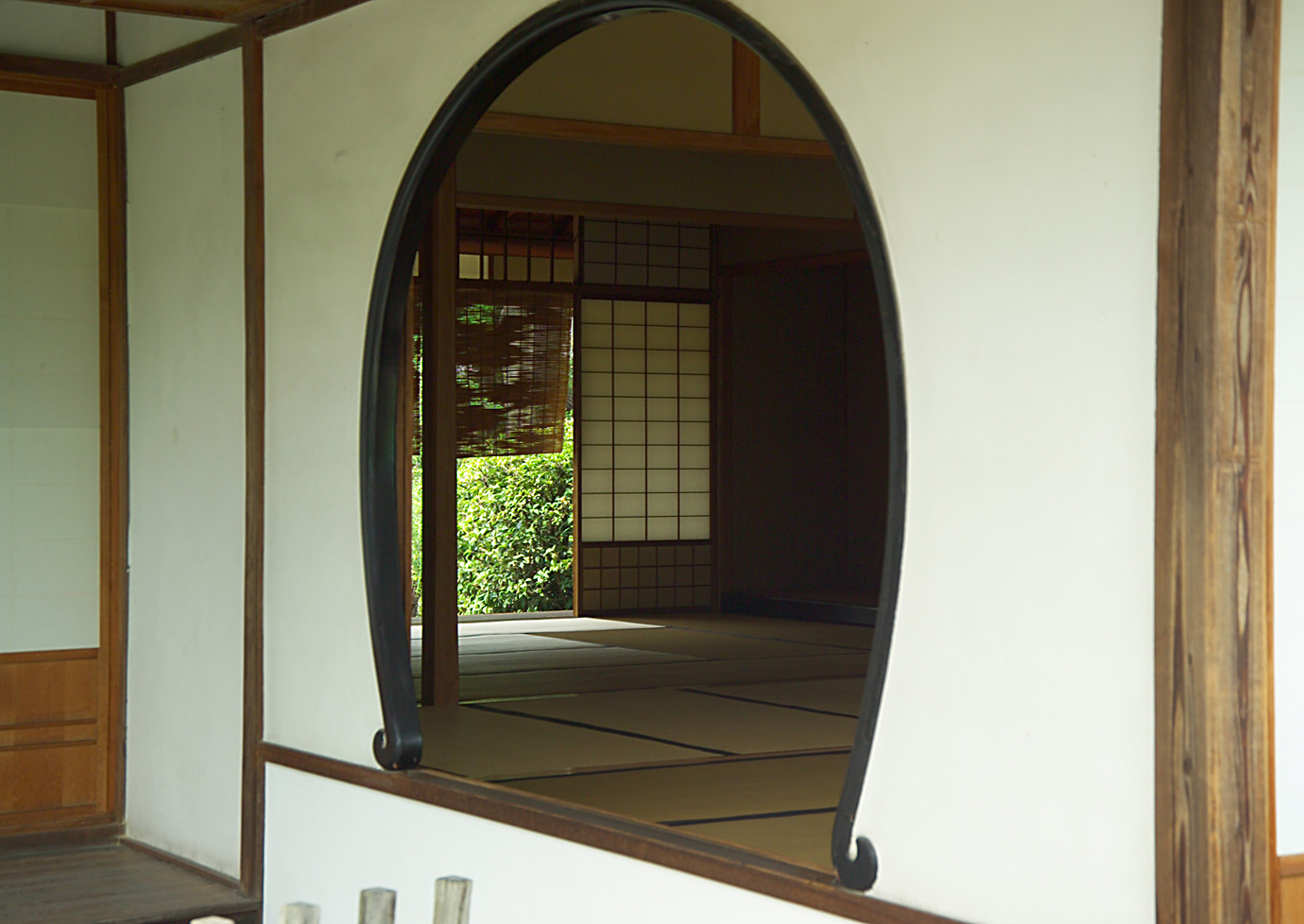

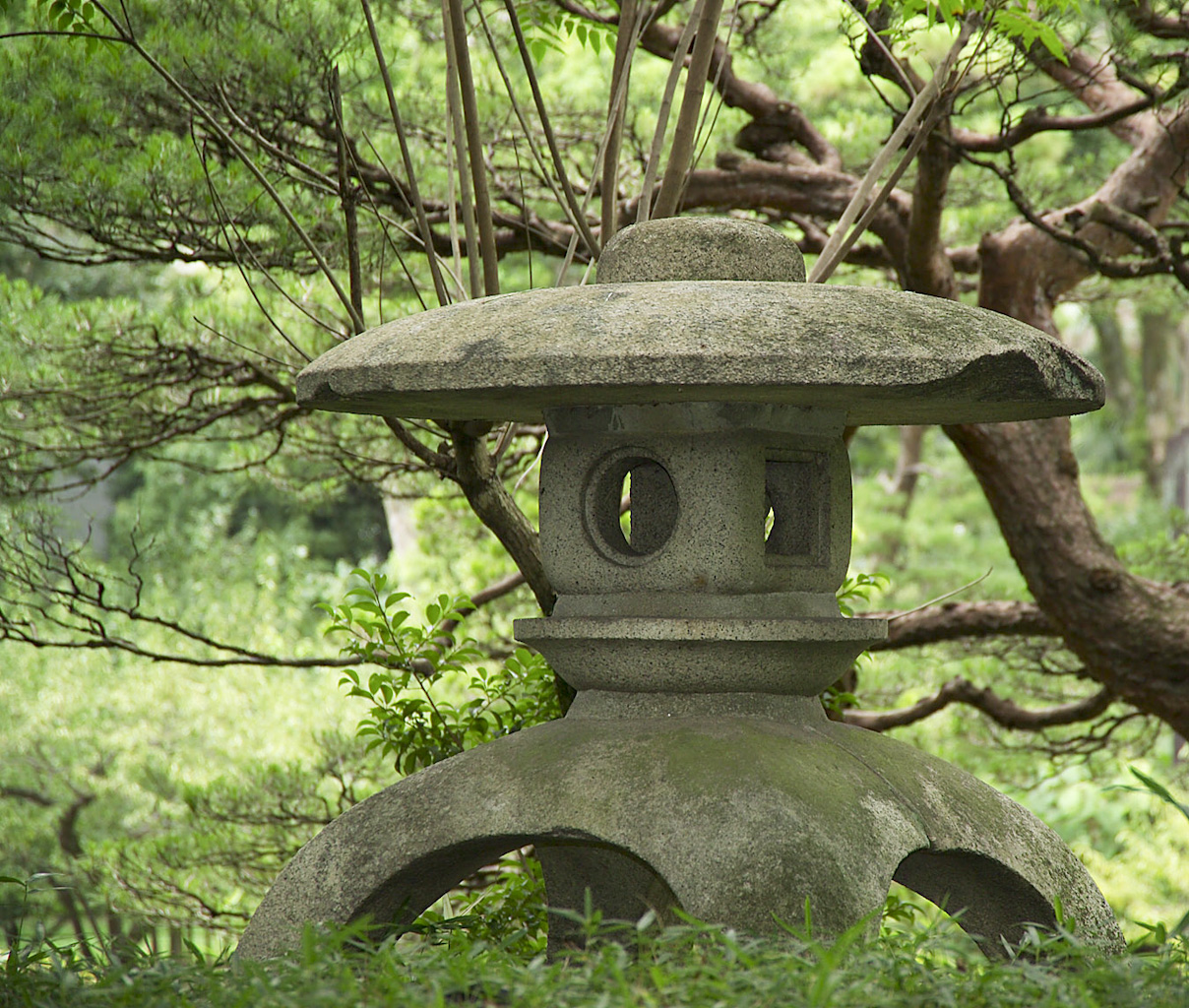

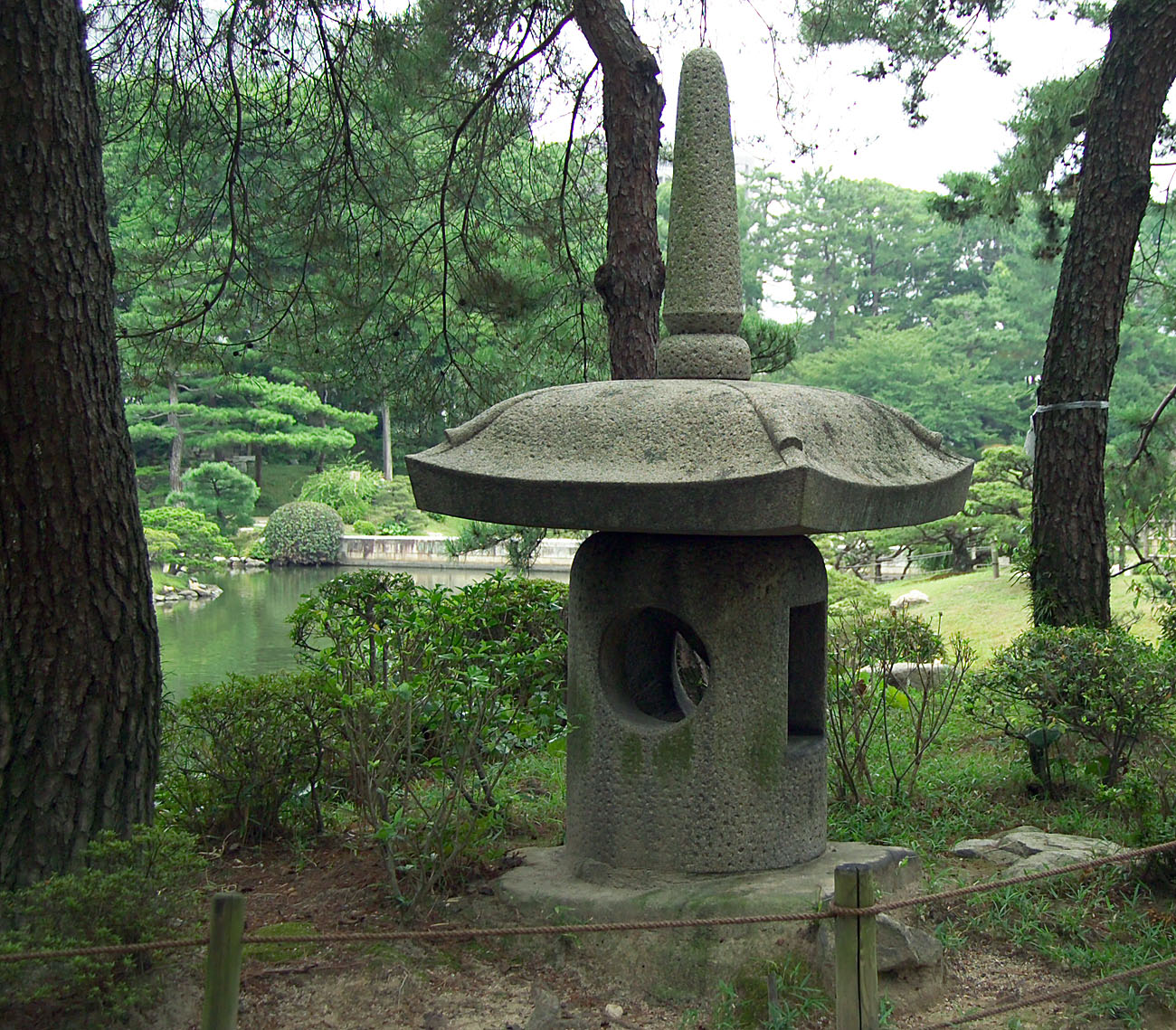

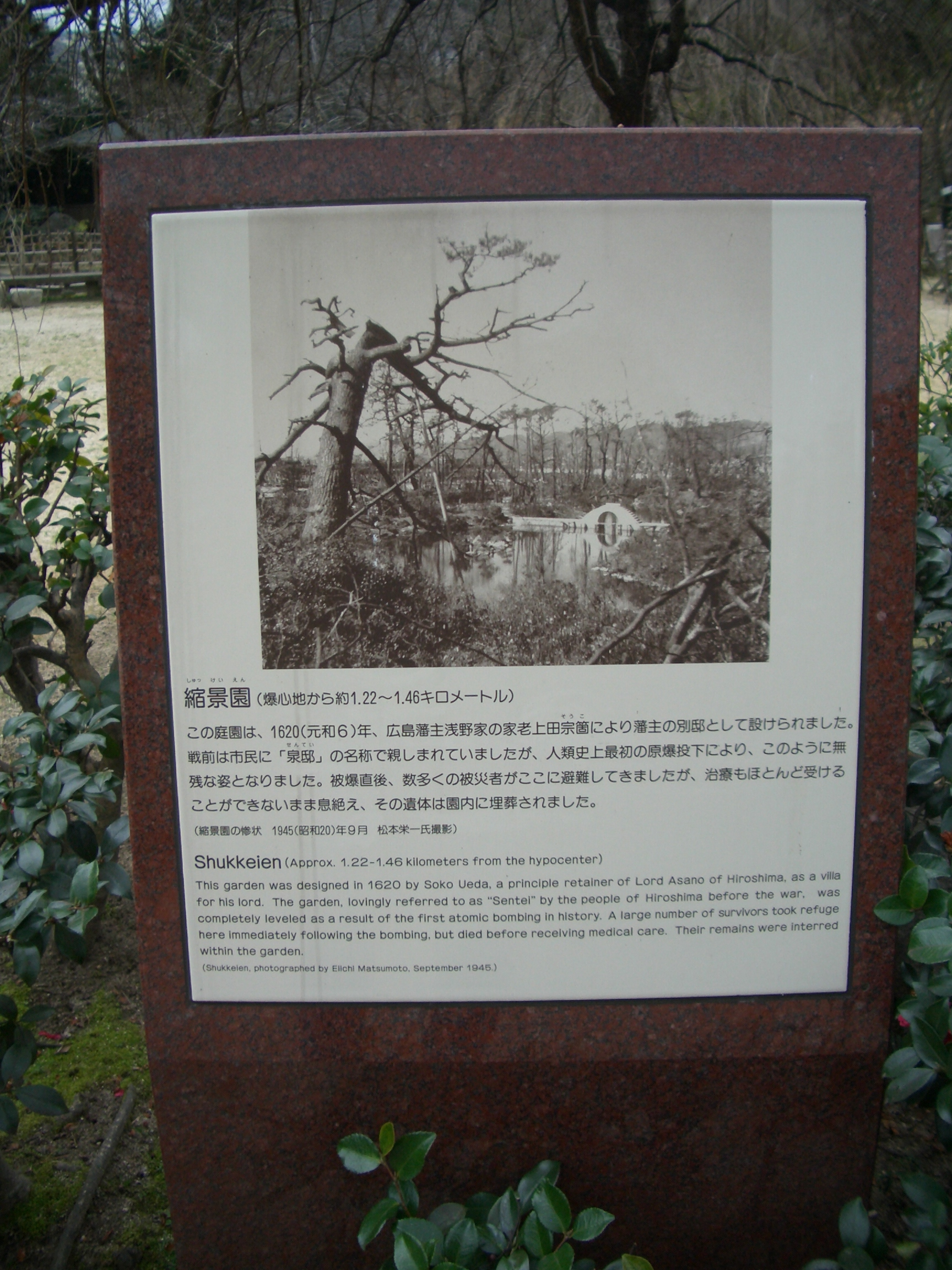
