= Hondōri =

Commercial area in Hiroshima, Japan

Coordinates: 34°23′37″N 132°27′25″E

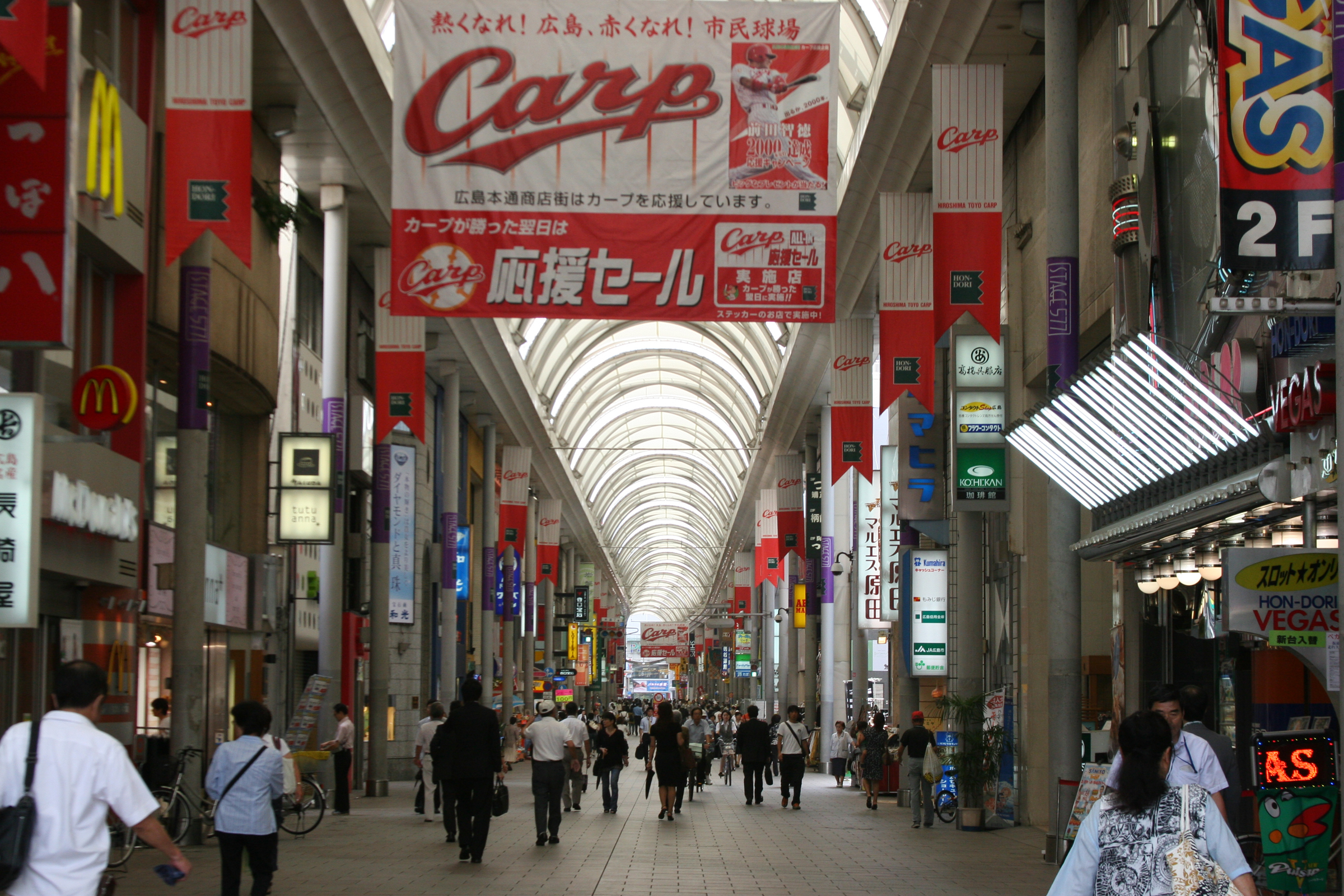
Hondori shopping arcade in 2007

Hondōri (本通) is a commercial area in Naka-ku, Hiroshima, Japan, which centers on the Hondōri street which today is a shopping arcade. Hondōri, which means "Main Street", runs from Hatchōbori to the Hiroshima Peace Memorial Park. Hondōri was also previously called Hirataya-chō. Hondōri prospered in the early 20th century, and in 1931, lily-of-the-valley lanterns were installed which allowed shops to stay open late.

== Atomic bombing ==
The entire shopping area along Hondōri was destroyed by the 1945 atomic bombing, due to the blast and fire. Shimomura Jewelers, located in a reinforced concrete building with an iconic clock tower, was severely damaged but like a number of concrete buildings in Hiroshima, it partially survived. The blast caused its side walls to severely tilt over.

The Teikoku Bank building, originally built in 1925, also survived the blast, although its roof collapsed, a wall was destroyed, and it received other structural damages. By May 1950, the Teikoku Bank building had been restored and the Takaki Bakery (Andersen Bakery) opened in the building in 1967.

== Present day ==
In the 1950s, Hondōri was reconstructed and now it is a modern shopping arcade, which connects the Peace Memorial Park, across Rijō-dōri, to Parco department store and Hatchōbori.

Hiroshima's Hiroden (street cars) stop at the Hiroden Hondori Station. The Astram Line also serves Hondori, with the Hondōri Station as a terminal station.

Okonomi-mura, located near the east end of Hondōri, was the top food theme park destination for families in Japan according to an April 2004 poll.
