= Hondōri Station =

Hondōri Station may refer to:

- Hondōri Station (Astram Line), a people mover station in Hiroshima, Japan
- Hondōri Station (Hiroden), a tram stop in Hiroshima, Japan
