= Okonomi-mura =

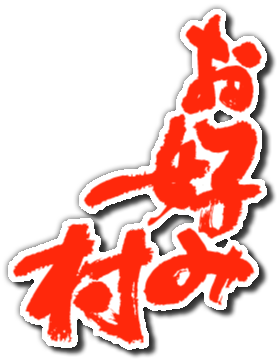

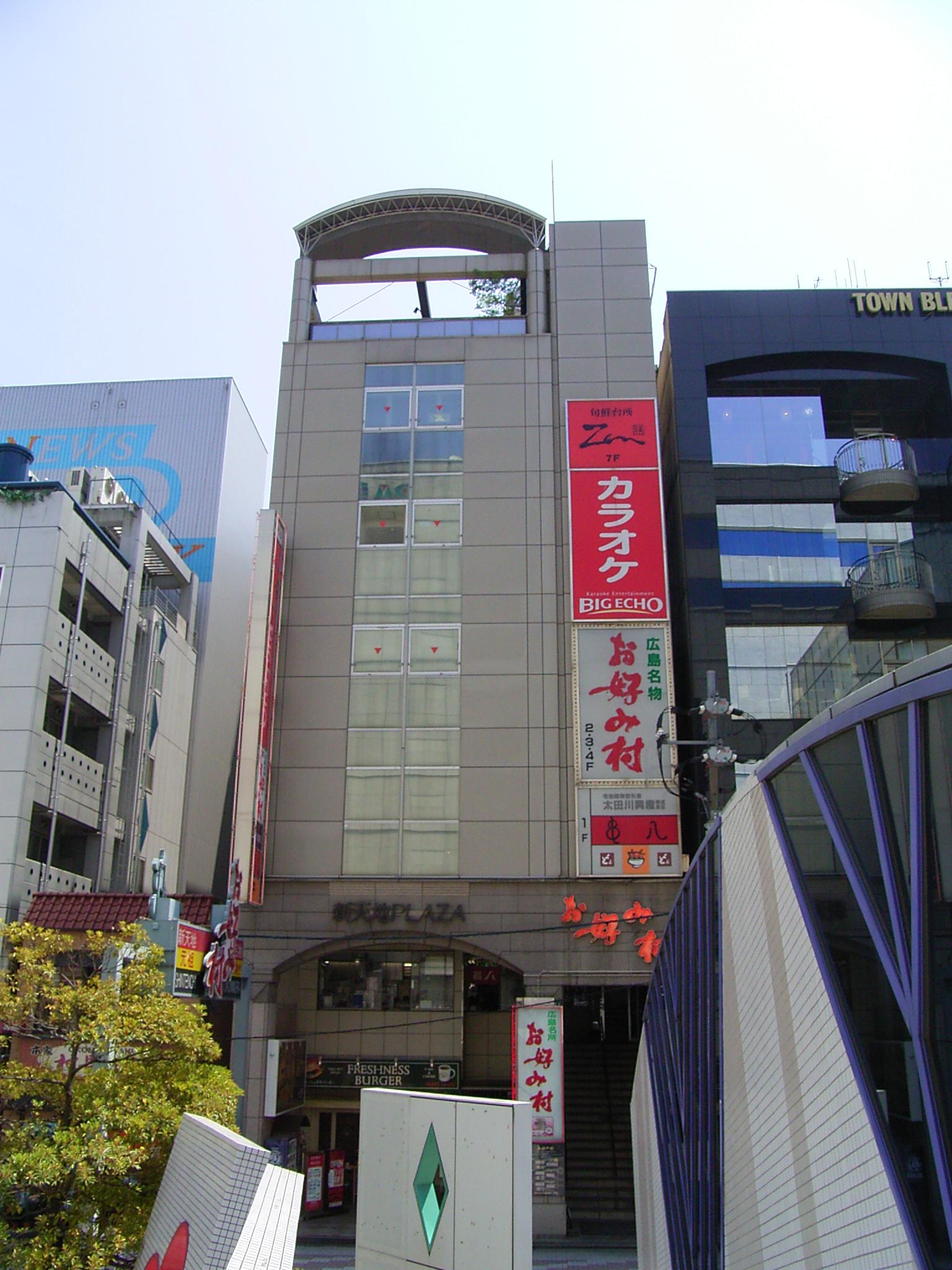
- Okonomi-mura from the front of the building
- Interactive map of Okonomi-mura

Restaurant information
- Established: December 1965
- Food type: Okonomiyaki
- Dress code: Casual
- Location: 5-13 Shintenchi, Naka-ku, Hiroshima, Hiroshima Prefecture 730-0034, Japan
- Coordinates: 34.391309°N 132.461928°E
- Other information: contains over 25 small okonomiyaki restaurants
- Website: http://www.okonomimura.jp/

Okonomi-mura (お好み村; literally "Okonomiyaki Village") is a Hiroshima-style okonomiyaki food theme park located at 5-13 Shintenchi in Naka-ku, Hiroshima, Hiroshima Prefecture, Japan. It is near the east end of Hondōri and has over 25 okonomiyaki restaurants, each with a slightly different style and set of ingredients. The restaurants there use a specialty okonomiyaki sauce created especially for Okonomi-mura by Sun Foods.

The Nihon Keizai Shimbun reported that Okonomi-mura was the top food theme park destination for families in Japan according to an April 2004 poll.

== History and location ==
Okonomi-mura is located at 5-13 Shintenchi in Naka-ku, Hiroshima, Hiroshima Prefecture, Japan, near the east end of Hondōri. Following the atomic bombing of the city in August 1945, the issen yōshoku (一銭洋食; lit. "one-coin Western food"), a thin pancake topped with green onions and bonito flakes or shrimp that had gained popularity in Hiroshima prior to the war, became a cheap way for the surviving residents to have food to eat. The Shintenchi area became a place where many of these shops began going beyond the original ingredients and making it "cooked how you like it" (お好み焼き, okonomiyaki). This area is where the Okonomi-mura building was eventually built.

=== Access ===
Okonomi-mura is accessible from Hatchobori Station on the Hiroden Main and Hiroden Hakushima Lines. It is located about a 3–5 minutes walk (1,400 feet (430 m)) south-southwest of the station, just off Chūō-dōri. From the Hiroden Main Line Hondōri Station, it is about a 6-8 minute walk (1,900 feet (580 m)) southeast of the station.

== Amenities ==
Okonomimura has over 25 okonomiyaki restaurants as of April 2020, each with a slightly different style and set of ingredients. The restaurants are spread across four floors of the building. It was the top food theme park destination for families in Japan according to an April 2004 poll. Sunfoods created a specialty okonomiyaki sauce used exclusively by the restaurants in Okonomi-mura.
