= Okonomiyaki =

Japanese savory pancake

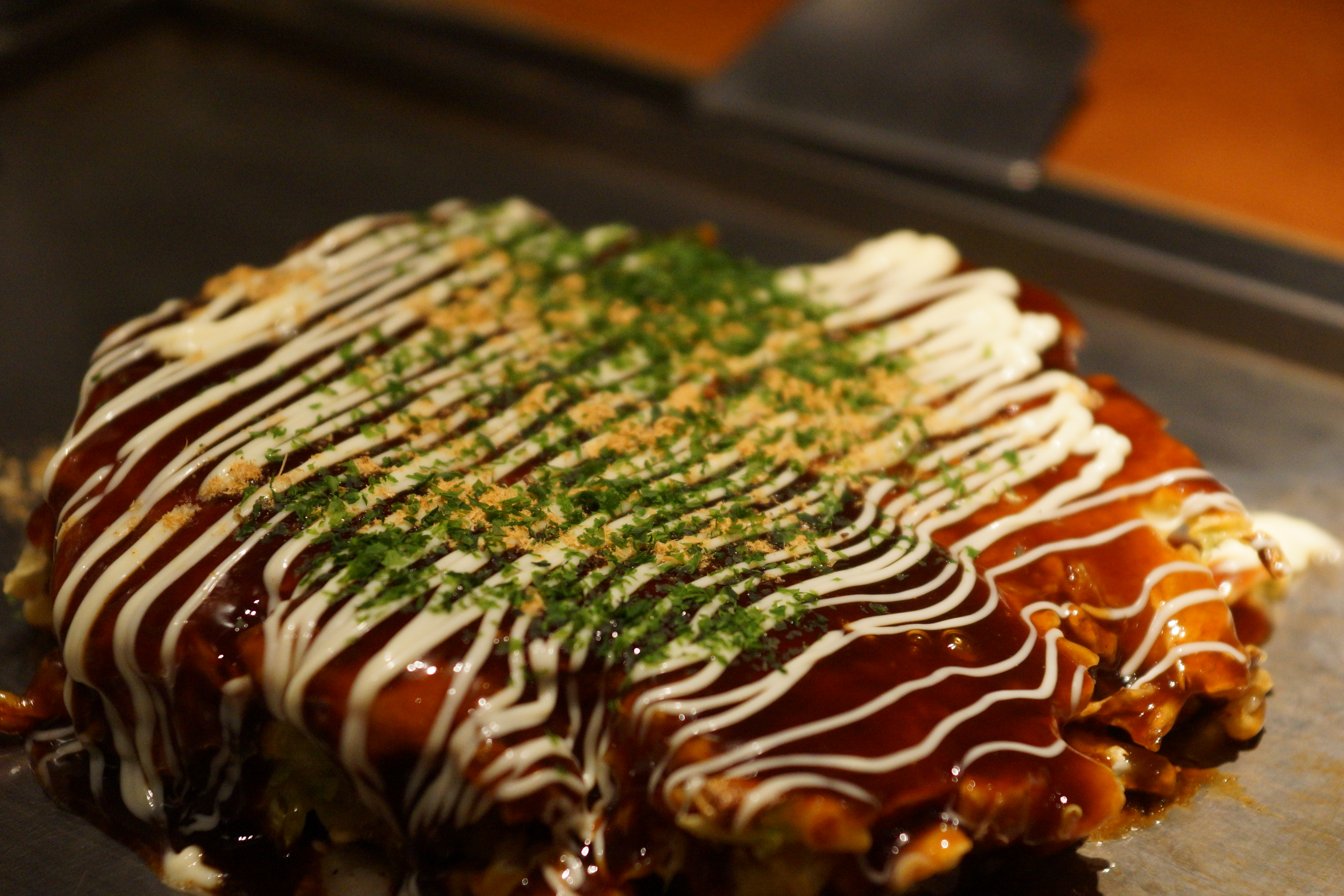
- Okonomiyaki
- Course: Main course
- Place of origin: Japan
- Region or state: Hiroshima, Osaka
- Serving temperature: Hot
- Main ingredients: Wheat flour batter, cabbage
- Variations: Regional

Okonomiyaki (Japanese: お好み焼き; pronounced [okonomʲijakʲi]) is a Japanese teppanyaki savory pancake dish consisting of wheat flour batter and other ingredients (mixed, or as toppings) cooked on a teppan (flat griddle). Common additions include cabbage, meat, and seafood, and toppings include okonomiyaki sauce (made with Worcestershire sauce), aonori (dried seaweed flakes), katsuobushi (bonito flakes), Japanese mayonnaise, and pickled ginger.

Okonomiyaki has two main variants from Hiroshima and the Kansai region of Japan, but is widely available throughout the country, with toppings and batters varying by area. The name is derived from the word okonomi (where the o is a politeness prefix), meaning "how you like" or "what you like", and yaki, meaning "grilled". It is an example of konamono (konamon in the Kansai dialect), or flour-based Japanese cuisine.

It is also known by an abbreviated name, "okonomi".

A liquid-based okonomiyaki, popular in Tokyo, is called monjayaki and abbreviated as monja. Outside Japan, it can also be found served in Manila, Taipei, Bangkok, and Jakarta by street vendors.

== History ==
A thin crêpe-like confection called funoyaki may be an early precursor to okonomiyaki. Records of the word funoyaki appear as far back as the 16th century, as written about by tea master Sen no Rikyū, and though the dish's ingredients are unclear, it may have included fu (wheat gluten). By the late Edo period (1603–1867), funoyaki referred to a thin crêpe baked on a cooking pot, with miso basted on one side. This confection is the ancestor of the modern confections kintsuba (金つば), which is also called gintsuba (銀つば) in Kyoto and Osaka, and taiko-yaki (also known as imagawayaki), which both use nerian (練り餡), a sweet bean paste.

In the Meiji era (1868–1912), monjiyaki (文字焼き), a related confection, was popular with children at dagashiya (駄菓子屋), shops selling cheap sweets. This was made by drawing letters (monji) or pictures with flour batter on a teppan (iron griddle) and adding ingredients of choice. The confectionary was also called dondonyaki (どんどん焼き), from the onomatopoeia of the stall sellers beating drums to attract customers.

The first appearance of the word "okonomiyaki" was at a shop in Osaka in the 1930s. After the 1923 Great Kantō earthquake when people lacked amenities, it became a pastime to cook these crêpes, and after World War II (when there was a short supply of rice) okonomiyaki emerged as an inexpensive and filling dish for all ages, often with savory toppings, such as meat, seafood, and vegetables. This "okonomiyaki boom" saw household equipment and ingredients for the dish become commercially available. Monjiyaki also developed into the related modern dish monjayaki (モンジャ焼き), which has a more runny batter due to more added water, resulting in a different cooked consistency.

The issen yōshoku (cheap Western-style cuisine) of Kyoto, which developed in the Taishō period (1912–1926), may have produced an early form of modern savory okonomiyaki in the form of a pancake with Worcestershire sauce and chopped scallion.

== Variations by region ==
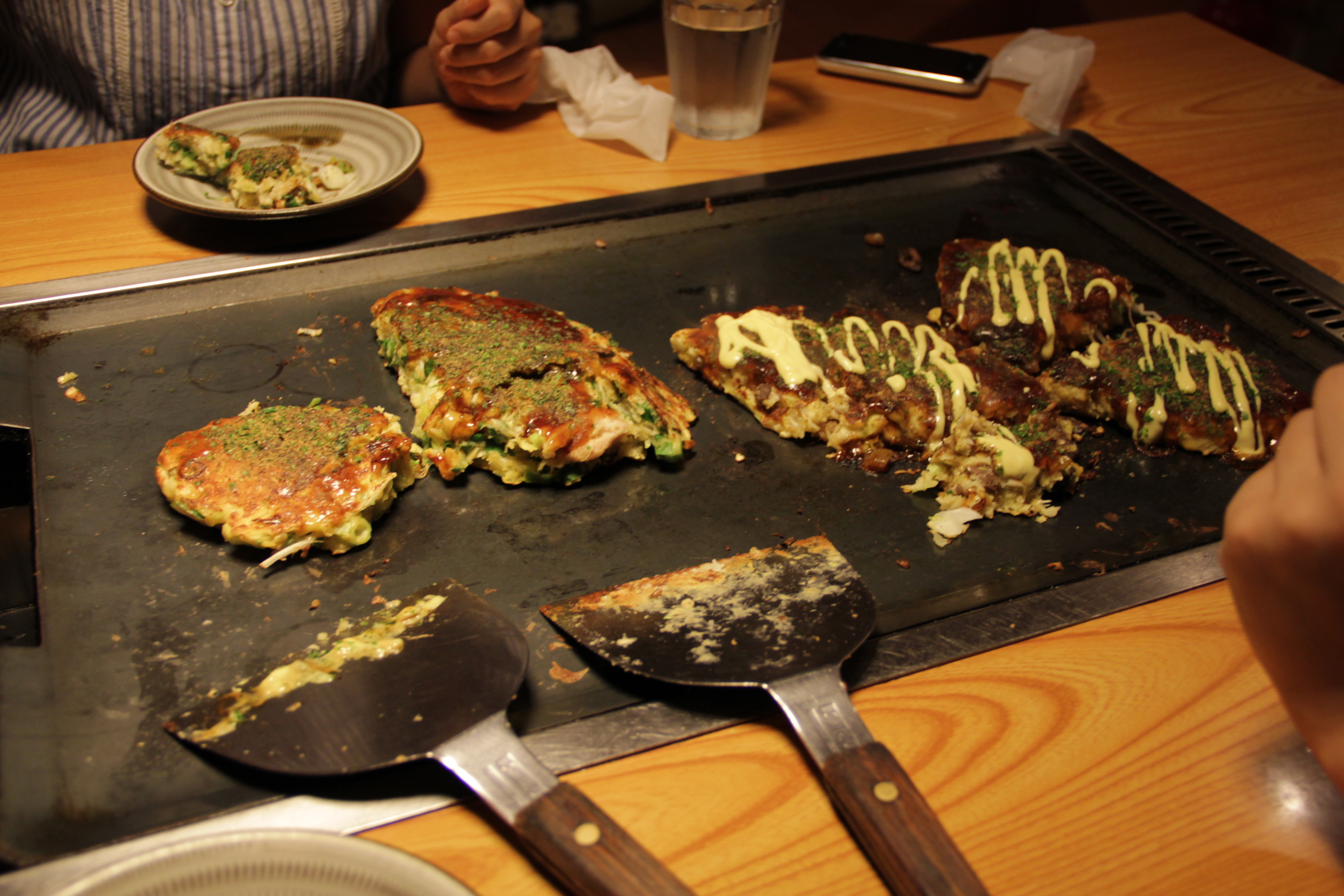
Kansai okonomiyaki on an iron griddle

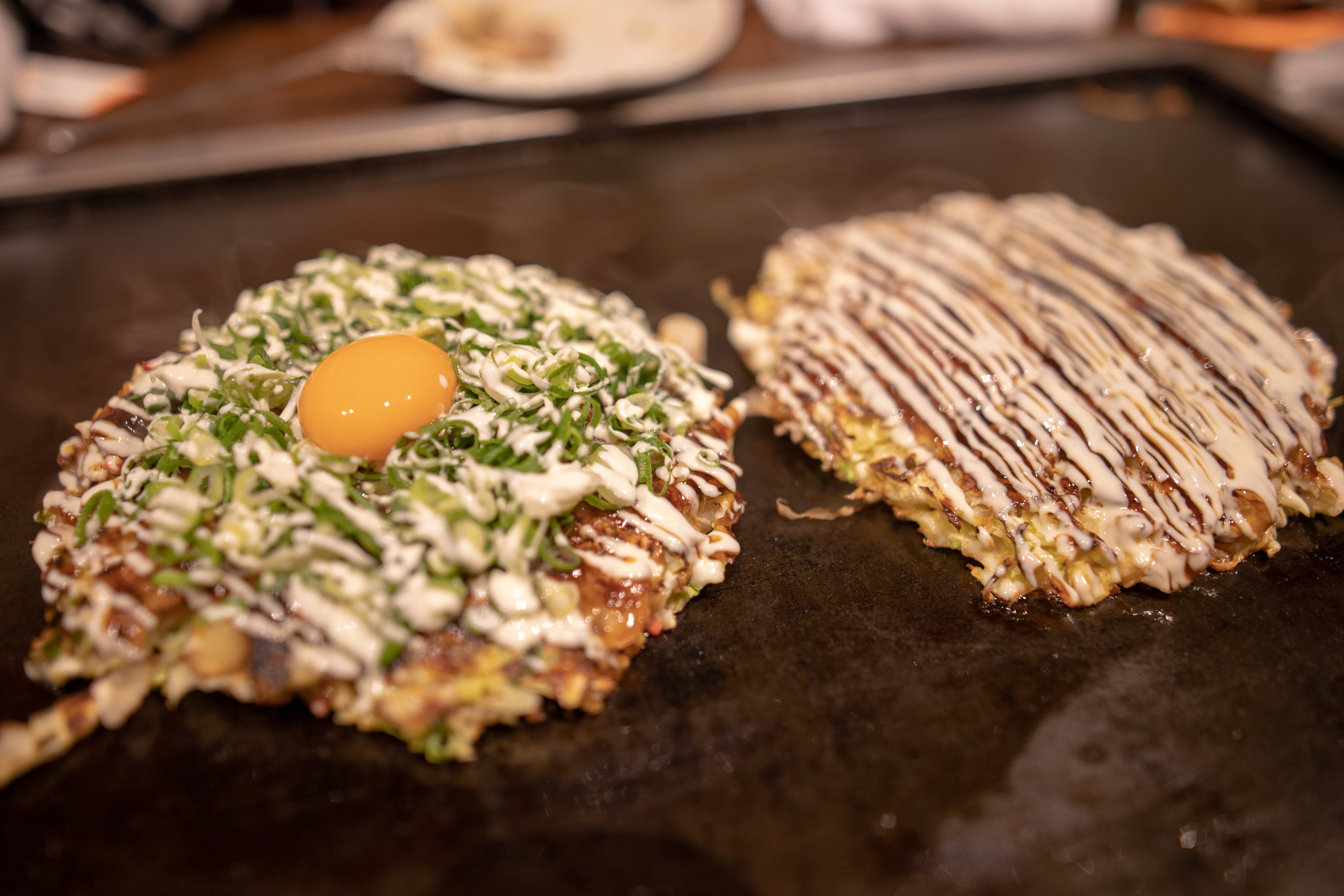
Two Kansai okonomiyaki

The dish is known for two distinct main variants, one in Kansai and Osaka and one in Hiroshima.

=== Kansai area ===
Okonomiyaki in the Kansai or Osaka style is the predominant version of the dish, found throughout most of Japan. The batter is made of flour, grated nagaimo (a long type of yam), dashi or water, eggs, and shredded cabbage, and usually contains other ingredients such as green onion, meat (usually thinly sliced pork belly or American bacon), octopus, squid, shrimp, vegetables, konjac, mochi, or cheese.

It is sometimes compared to an omelette or a pancake and is sometimes referred to as a "Japanese pizza" or "Osaka soul food". The dish can be prepared in advance, allowing customers to use a teppan or special hotplates to fry after mixing the ingredients. They may also have a diner-style counter where the cook prepares the dish in front of the customers.

It is prepared much like a pancake. The batter and other ingredients are pan-fried on both sides on a teppan using metal spatulas that are later used to cut the dish when it has finished cooking. Cooked okonomiyaki is topped with ingredients that include okonomiyaki sauce (made with Worcestershire sauce), aonori (seaweed flakes), katsuobushi (bonito flakes), Japanese mayonnaise, and pickled ginger (beni shōga).

When served with a layer of fried noodles (either yakisoba or udon), the resulting dish is called modan-yaki (モダン焼き), the name of which may be derived from the English word "modern" or as a contraction of mori dakusan (盛りだくさん), meaning "a lot" or "piled high" signifying the volume of food from having both noodles and okonomiyaki. Negiyaki (ねぎ焼き) is a thinner variation of okonomiyaki made with a great deal of scallions, comparable to Korean pajeon and Chinese green onion pancakes.

A variation called kashimin-yaki is made of chicken and tallow instead of pork in Kishiwada, Osaka. In Hamamatsu, takuan (pickled daikon) is mixed in okonomiyaki. Stewed sweet kintoki-mame is mixed in okonomiyaki in Tokushima Prefecture.

=== Hiroshima area ===
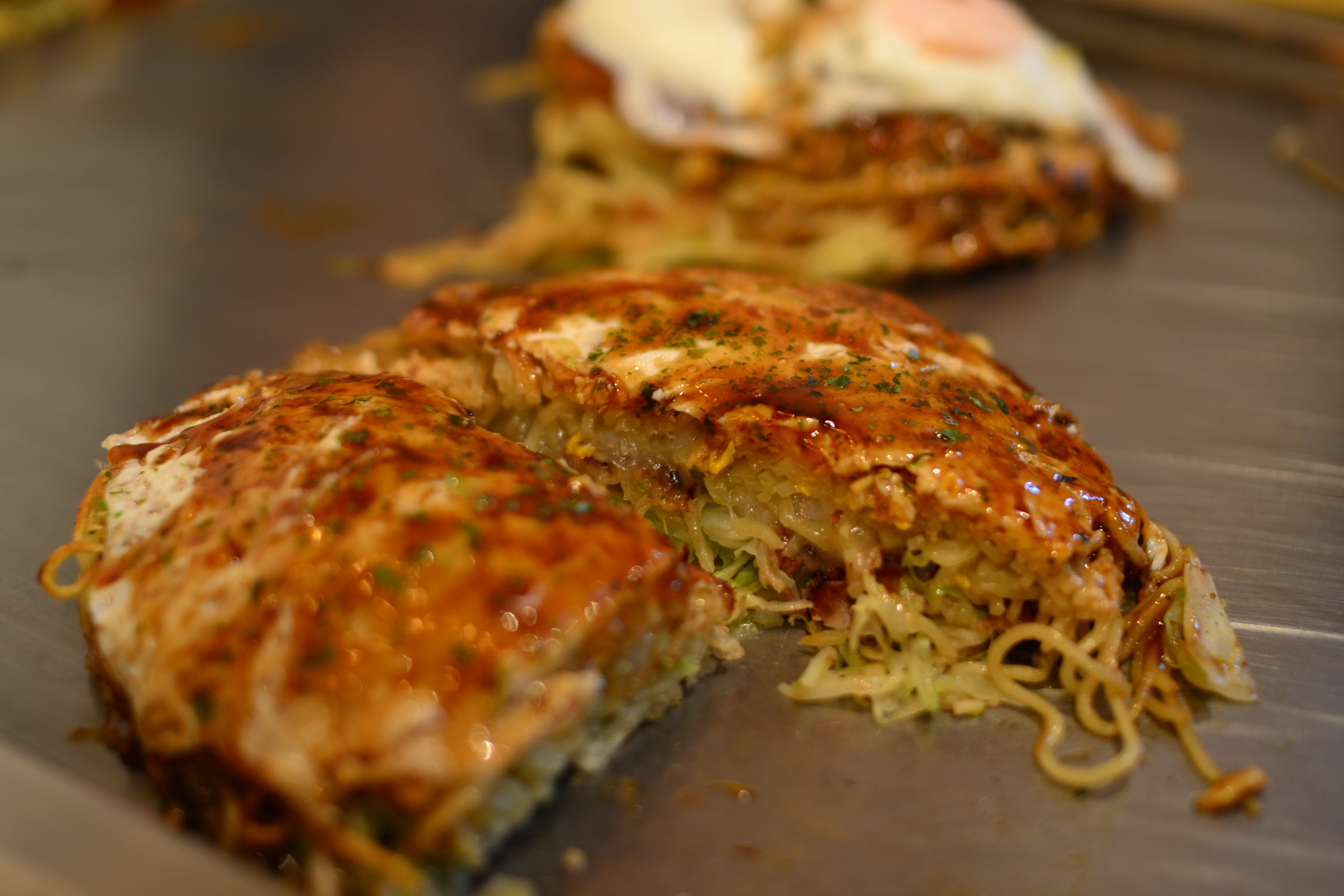
Hiroshima-style okonomiyaki

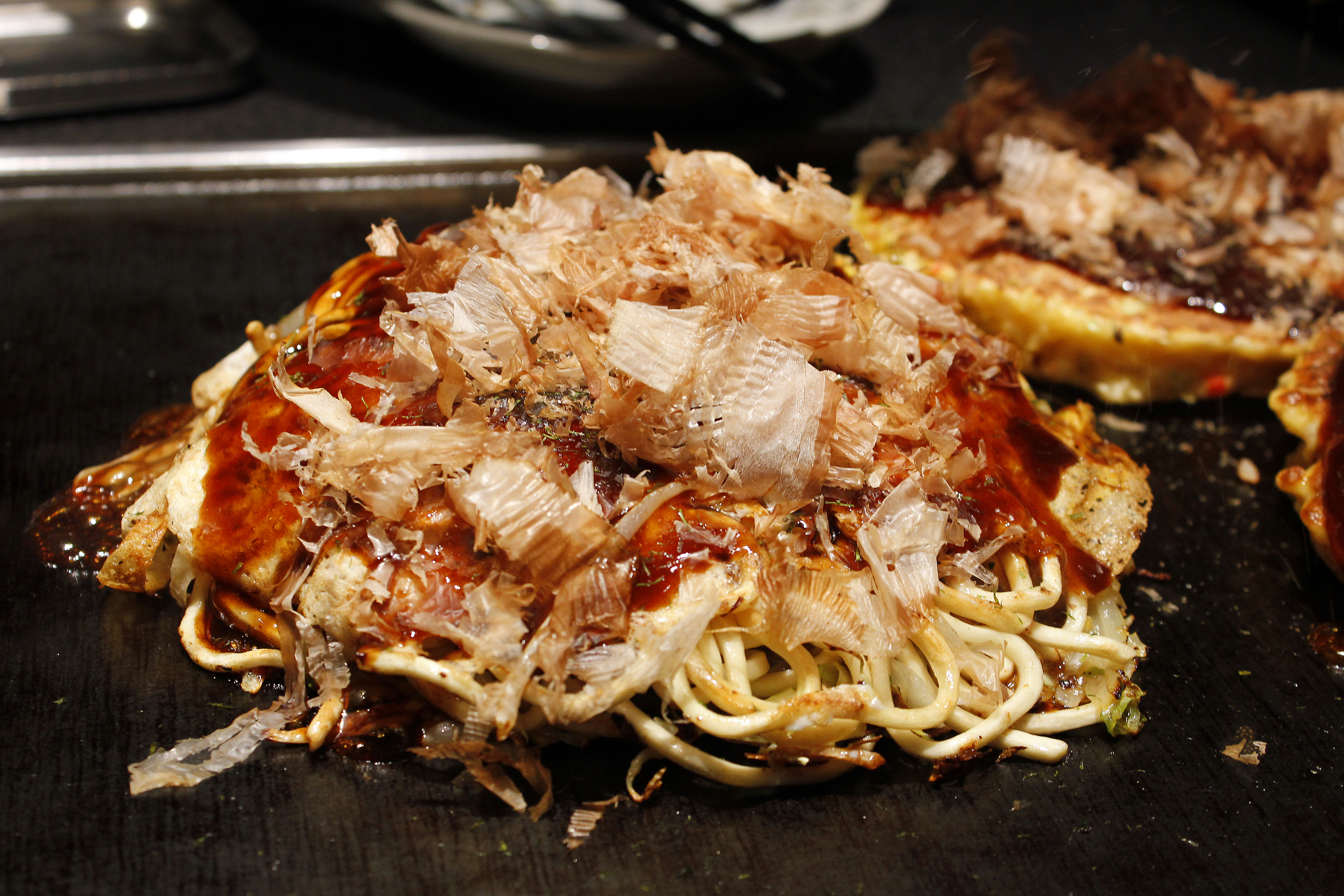
Hiroshima-style okonomiyaki

In the city of Hiroshima, there are over 2000 okonomiyaki restaurants, and the prefecture has more of those restaurants per capita than any other place in Japan. Issen yōshoku (一銭洋食, lit. "One-coin Western food"), a thin pancake topped with green onions and bonito flakes or shrimp, became popular in Hiroshima prior to World War II. After the atomic bombing of the city in August 1945, issen yōshoku became a cheap way for the surviving residents to have food to eat. Because the original ingredients were not always easy to obtain, many of the street vendors and shops began making it "cooked how you like it" (お好み焼き, okonomiyaki), using whatever ingredients were available.

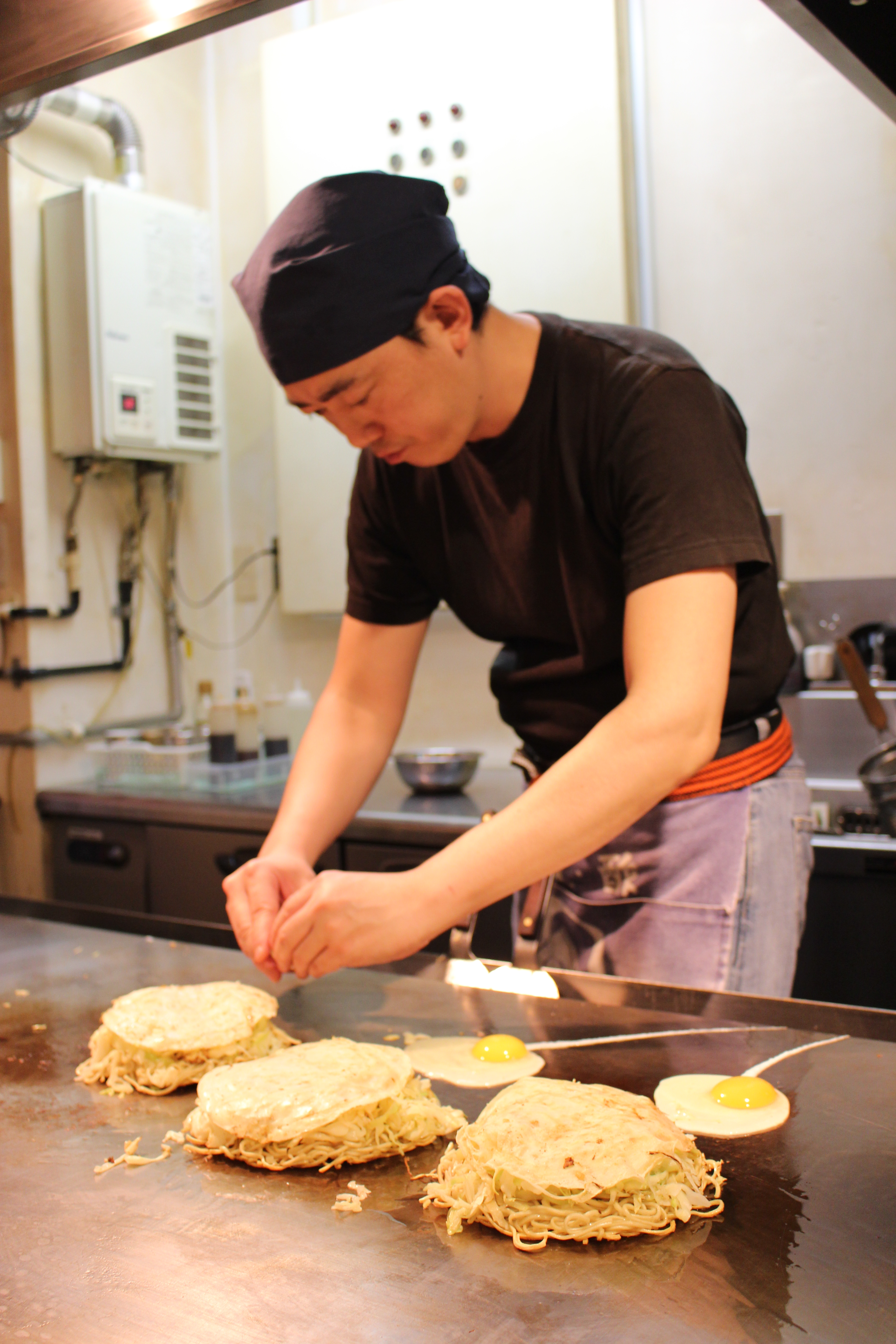
A chef preparing okonomiyaki in a restaurant in Hiroshima

The ingredients are layered rather than mixed. The layers are typically batter, cabbage, pork, and yakisoba. Optional items such as squid, octopus, dried bonito flakes, and other seafood, as well as nori flakes or powder, mung bean sprouts, egg, chicken, cheese, and other ingredients, depending on the preferences of the cook and the customer. Noodles (yakisoba or udon) are also used as a topping with fried egg and a generous amount of okonomiyaki sauce.

The amount of cabbage used is usually three to four times the amount used in the Osaka style. It starts out piled very high and is pushed down as the cabbage cooks. The order of the layers may vary slightly depending on the chef's style and preference, and ingredients vary depending on the preference of the customer. This style is also called Hiroshima-yaki or Hiroshima-okonomi.

In and around the Hiroshima area, there are a number of variations on the style. Fuchūyaki (府中焼き) is made with ground meat instead of pork belly in Fuchū, Hiroshima. Oysters (kaki) are mixed in okonomiyaki to make kaki-oko in Hinase, Okayama. On the island of Innoshima, a variety called Innoshima okonomiyaki (因島お好み焼き) (or in'oko (いんおこ) for short) includes udon, bonito flakes, Worcestershire sauce, and vegetables fried with uncooked batter. Together with "Onomichiyaki", in'oko is considered a B-class gourmet food along the Shimanami Kaidō. There is a restaurant in Hiroshima where customers can order jalapeños, tortilla chips, chorizo, and other Latin American items either in—or as a side dish to—okonomiyaki.

Otafuku, one of the most popular brands of okonomiyaki sauce, is based in Hiroshima and has an okonomiyaki museum and a cooking studio there. Okonomi-mura, in Naka-ku in Hiroshima, was the top food theme park destination for families in Japan according to an April 2004 poll.

=== Other areas ===
The Tsukishima district of Tokyo is popular for both okonomiyaki and monjayaki (the district's main street is named "Monja Street"). In some areas of Kyoto city, an old-style okonomiyaki called betayaki (べた焼き) is served. The dish is prepared in layers of thin batter, shredded cabbage and meat, with a fried egg and noodles.

Okonomiyaki is popular street food in cities including Manila, Taipei, Bangkok, and Jakarta.

== See also ==
- Buchimgae – Korean pan-fried dish
- Hirajacii
- Jeon – Korean pan-fried dish
- Jianbing
- Murtabak – Stuffed pancake with various fillings
- Pannenkoek – Pancake originating from the Netherlands
- Pesarattu
- Takoyaki – Japanese appetizer
- Uttapam

== Bibliography ==
- Heibonsha (1964). 世界百科事典 (Sekai hyakka jiten). (World Encyclopedia, in Japanese).
- Kumakura, Isao (熊倉功夫) (2007). Nihon ryori no rekishi (日本料理の歴史). Yoshikawa Kobunkan (吉川弘文館).
