= Chuden-mae Station =

Tram stop in Hiroshima, Japan

Coordinates: 34°23′19″N 132°27′19″E

Chuden-mae 中電前
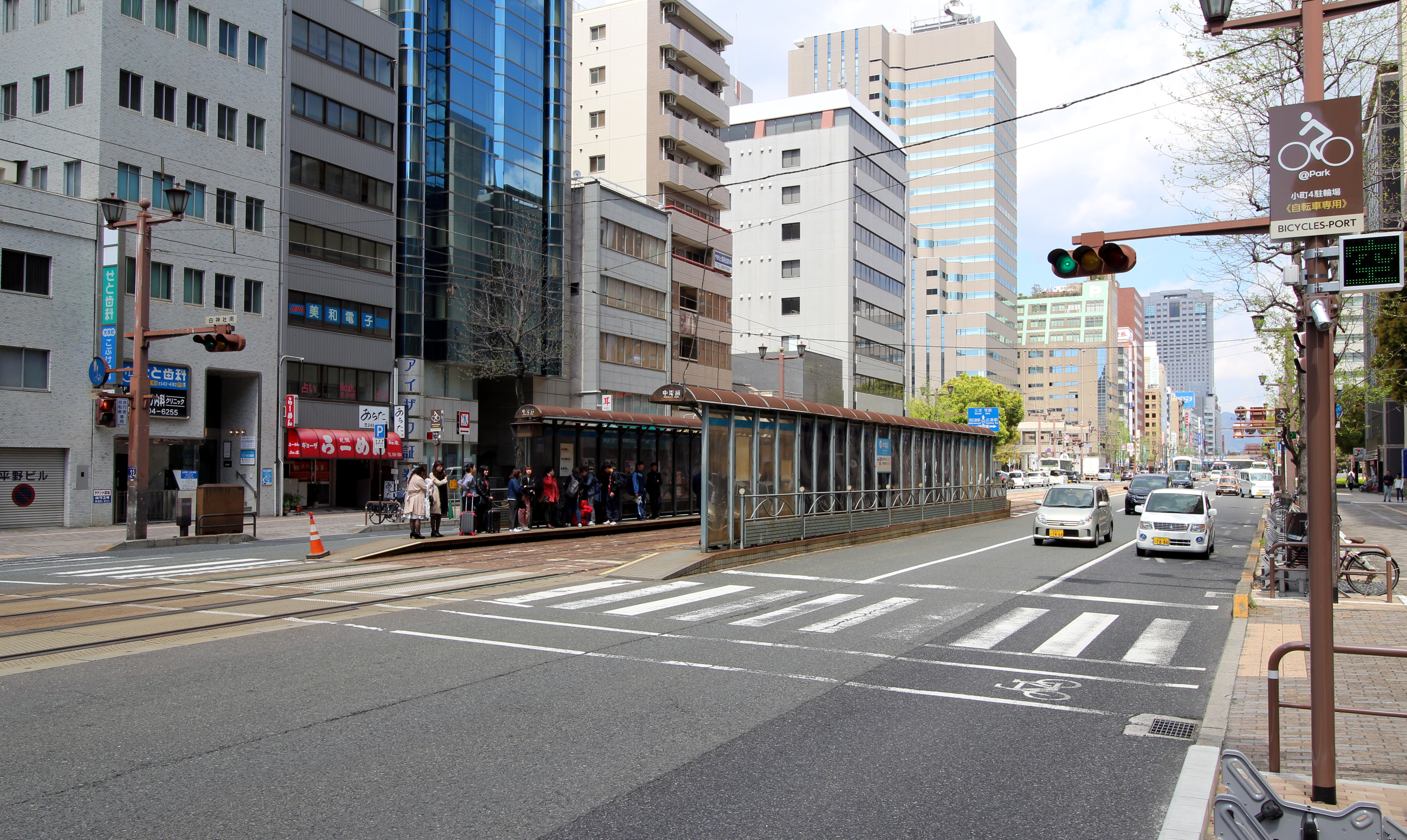

General information
- Location: Ote-machi 3-chome, Naka-ku, Hiroshima; Japan
- Operator: Hiroshima Electric Railway
- Lines: █ Hiroden Ujina Line; Route

Other information
- Station code: U3

History
- Opened: November 23, 1914
Location

Chuden-mae is a Hiroden station (tram stop) on Hiroden Ujina Line located in Ote-machi 3-chome, Naka-ku, Hiroshima.

== Routes ==
From Chuden-mae Station, there are three of Hiroden Streetcar routes.

- Hiroshima Station - Hiroshima Port Route
- Hiroden-nishi-hiroshima - Hiroshima Port Route
- Yokogawa Station - Hiroden-honsha-mae Route

== Connections ==
█ Ujina Line

Fukuro-machi — Chuden-mae — Shiyakusho-mae

== Around station ==
- Chugoku Electric Power Company Head Office

== History ==
- Opened as "Seitou-bashi" tram stop, named from the bridge "Seitou", on November 23, 1912.
- Renamed to "Shirakami-mae", named from the shrine "Shirakami", in 1919.
- Renamed to "Shirakamisha-mae" in 1945.
- Moved to the present place and renamed to the present name "Chuden-mae", on March 22, 1971.

== See also ==
- Hiroden lines and routes
