= Takanobashi Station =

Tram stop in Hiroshima, Japan

Coordinates: 34°22′59″N 132°27′15″E

Takanobashi 鷹野橋
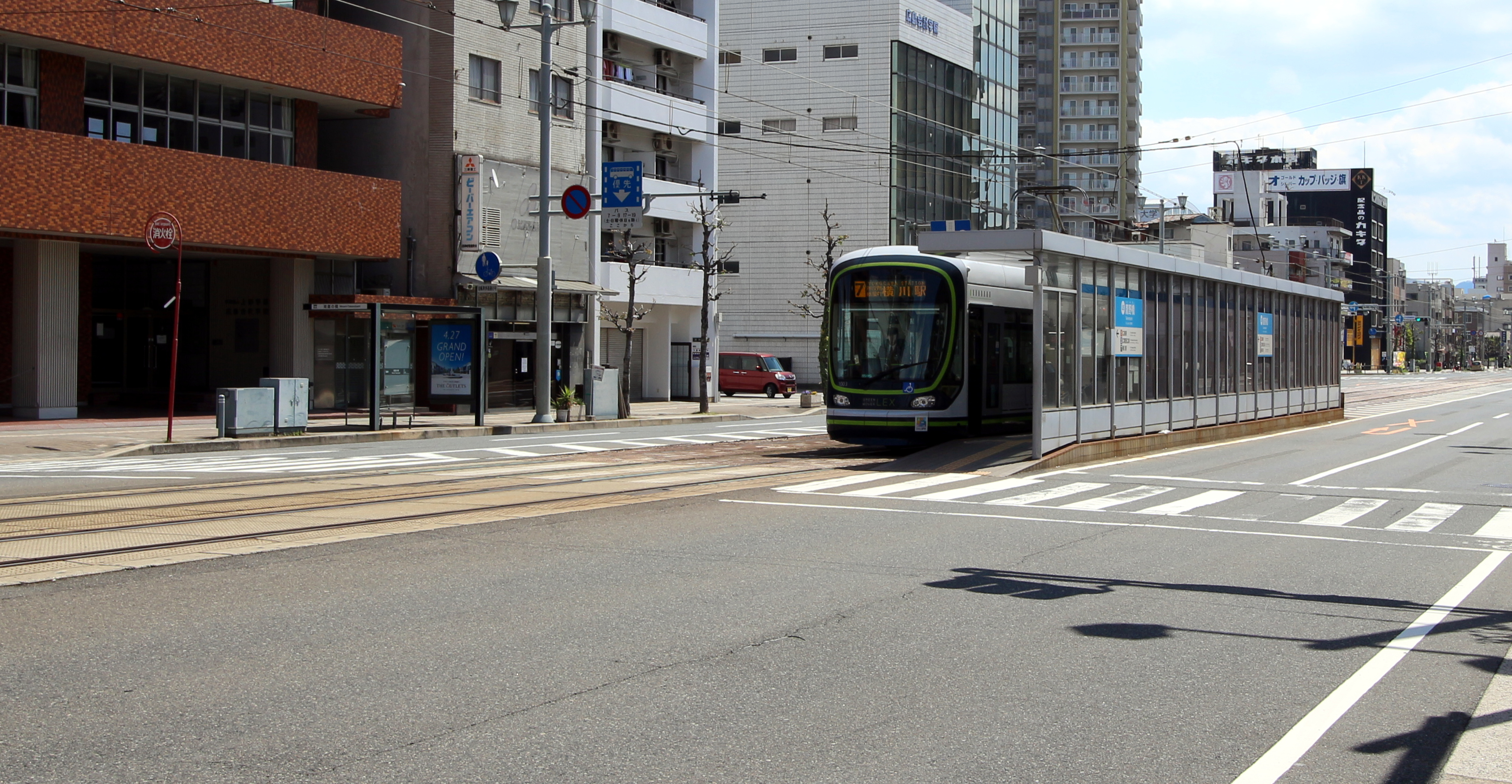

General information
- Location: Senda-machi 1-chome, Naka-ku, Hiroshima; Japan
- Operator: Hiroshima Electric Railway
- Lines: █ Hiroden Ujina Line; Route

Other information
- Station code: U5

History
- Opened: November 23, 1914
Location

Takanobashi is a Hiroden station (tram stop) on Hiroden Ujina Line located in Senda-machi 1-chome, Naka-ku, Hiroshima.

== Routes ==
From Takanobashi Station, there are three of Hiroden Streetcar routes.

- Hiroshima Station - Hiroshima Port Route
- Hiroden-nishi-hiroshima - Hiroshima Port Route
- Yokogawa Station - Hiroden-honsha-mae Route

== Connections ==
█ Ujina Line

Shiyakusho-mae — Takanobashi — Nisseki-byoin-mae

== Other services connections ==
=== Hiroshima Bus services routes ===
- Route #21 and #21-1 at "Takanobashi" bus stop
- Route #21-1 at "Minami-takanobashi" bus stop
- Route #21-2 at "Takanobashi-syoutengai" bus stop

== Around station ==
- Takanobashi Syoutengai
- Hiroshima Takanobashi Post Office
- Takanobashi Central Hospital
- Hiroshima Accounting Academy
- Hiroshima Salon Cinema

== History ==
- Opened as "Takano-bashi" tram stop, named from the bridge "Takano", on November 23, 1914.

== See also ==
- Hiroden lines and routes
