= Nisseki-byoin-mae Station =

Tram stop in Hiroshima, Japan

Coordinates: 34.3809°N 132.4560°E

Nisseki-byoin-mae 日赤病院前
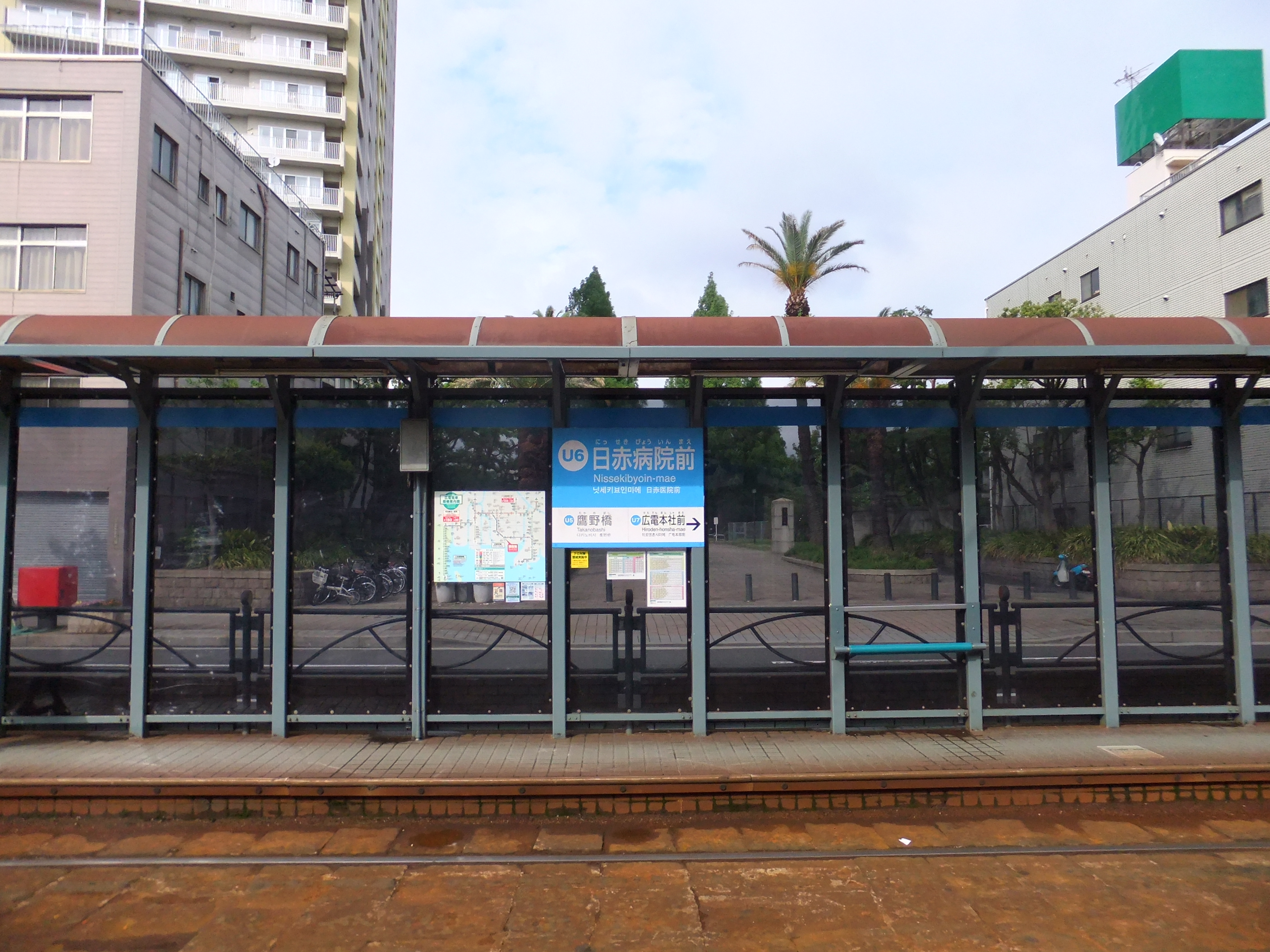

General information
- Location: Senda-machi 1-chome, Naka-ku, Hiroshima; Japan
- Operator: Hiroshima Electric Railway
- Lines: █ Hiroden Ujina Line; Route

Other information
- Station code: U6

History
- Opened: November 23, 1912
Location

Nisseki-byoin-mae is a Hiroden station (tram stop) on Hiroden Ujina Line located in front of Hiroshima Red Cross Hospital & Atomic-bomb Survivors Hospital, in Senda-machi 1-chome, Naka-ku, Hiroshima.

== Routes ==
From Nisseki-byoin-mae Station, there are three of Hiroden Streetcar routes.

- Hiroshima Station - Hiroshima Port Route
- Hiroden-nishi-hiroshima - Hiroshima Port Route
- Yokogawa Station - Hiroden-honsha-mae Route

== Connections ==
█ Ujina Line

Takanobashi — Nisseki-byoin-mae — Hiroden-honsha-mae

== Other services connections ==
=== Hiroshima Bus services routes ===
- Route #21-1 and #50 at "Nisseki-mae" bus stop

== Around station ==
- Hiroshima Red Cross Hospital & Atomic-bomb Survivors Hospital
- Hiroshima Red Cross Blood Center
- Hiroshima University - Higashisenda Campus

== History ==
Named after the former Hiroshima University, the station first opened as "Kotoshihan-mae" in November 1912. The station was later renamed in 1936 to "Daigaku-mae", and renamed again to "Hiroshima-Daigaku-mae" in 1964. In 2001, the station was further renamed after the "Hiroshima Red Cross Hospital & Atomic-bomb Survivors Hospital" to its present name "Nisseki-byoin-mae".

== See also ==
- Hiroden lines and routes
