= Fukuro-machi Station =

Tram stop in Hiroshima, Japan

Coordinates: 34.3913°N 132.4561°E

Fukuro-machi Station 袋町
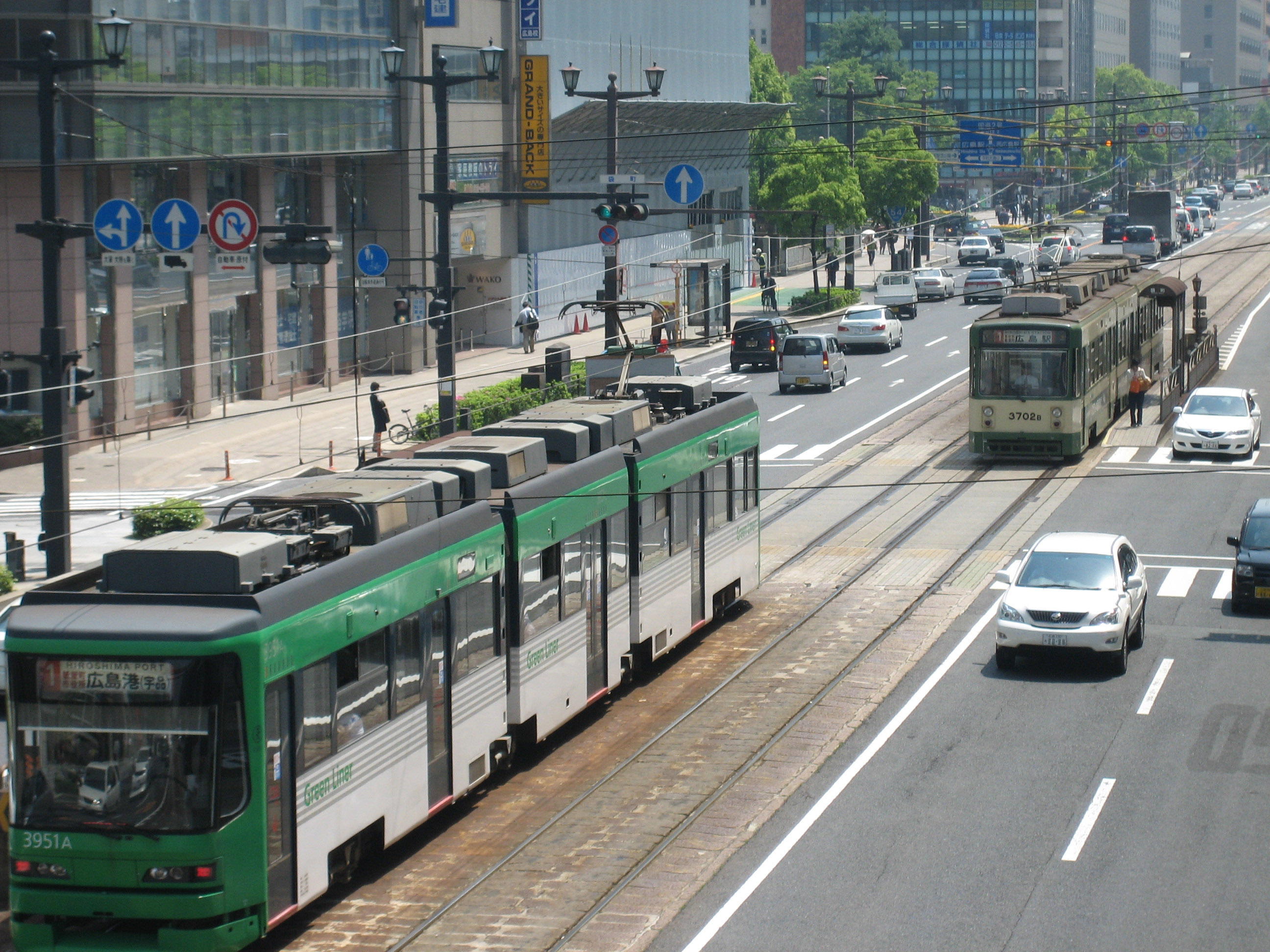

General information
- Location: Ote-machi 2-chome, Naka-ku, Hiroshima; Japan
- Operator: Hiroshima Electric Railway
- Lines: █ Hiroden Ujina Line; Route

Other information
- Station code: U2

History
- Opened: November 23, 1912
Location

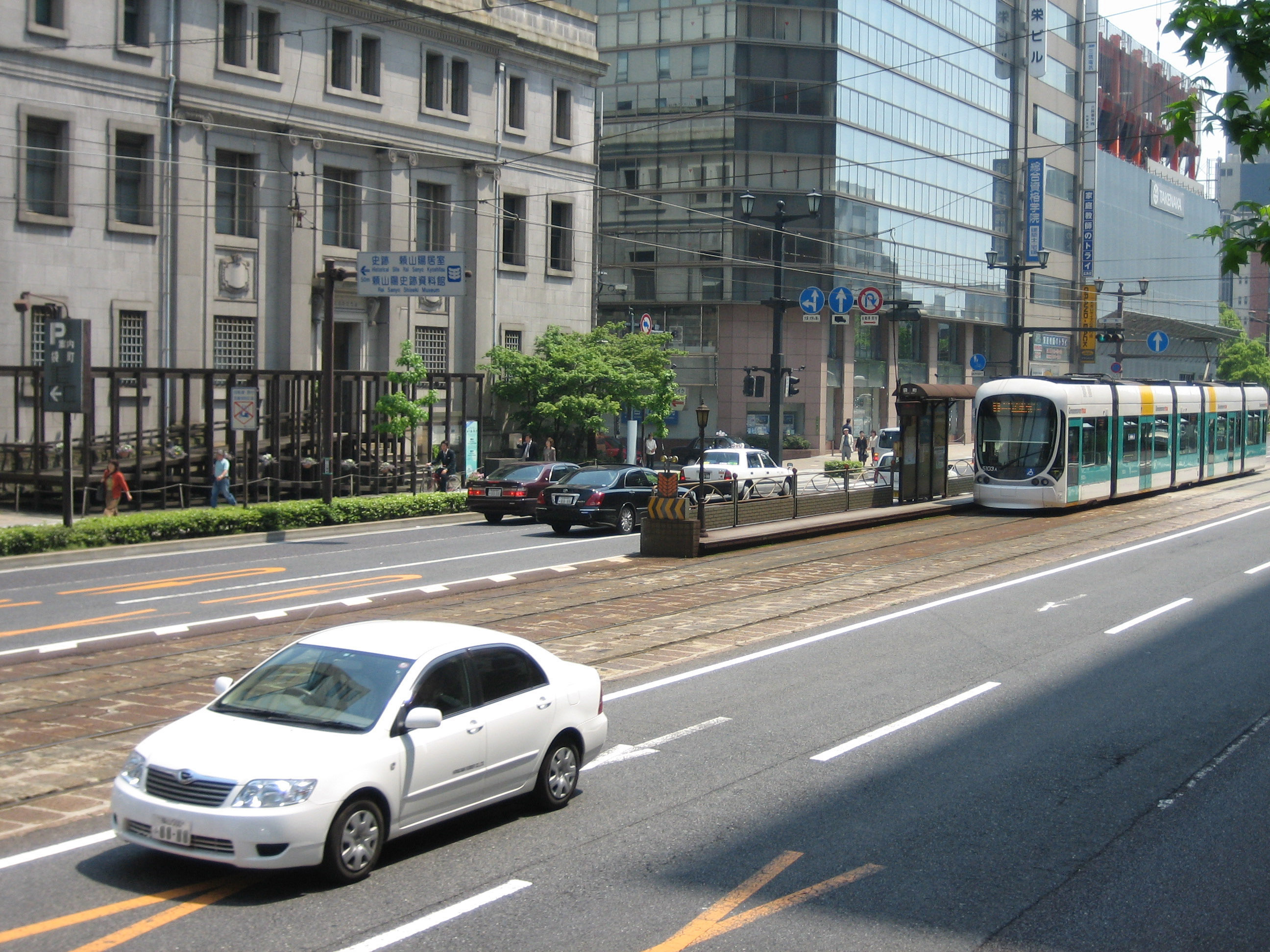
Fukuro-machi Station and the former Hiroshima Branch of Bank of Japan

Fukuro-machi is a Hiroden station (tram stop) on the Hiroden Ujina Line located in Ote-machi 2-chome, Naka-ku, Hiroshima.

== Connections ==
█ Ujina Line

Hondori — Fukuro-machi — Chuden-mae

== Around station ==
- Hiroshima Peace Memorial Park
- Hiroshima Hondori Syoutengai
- Municipal Fukuromachi Elementary School in Hiroshima
  - Fukuromachi Elementary School Peace Museum
- The Former Bank of Japan Hiroshima Branch
- NHK Hiroshima
- Hiroshima ANA Hotel
- Hiroshima TV

== History ==
- Opened on November 23, 1912.
- Closed from 1942 to 1945.

== See also ==
- Hiroden lines and routes
