= Shiyakusho-mae Station (Hiroshima) =

Tram station in Hiroshima, Hiroshima prefecture, Japan

Coordinates: 34°23′09″N 132°27′16″E

Shiyakusho-mae 市役所前
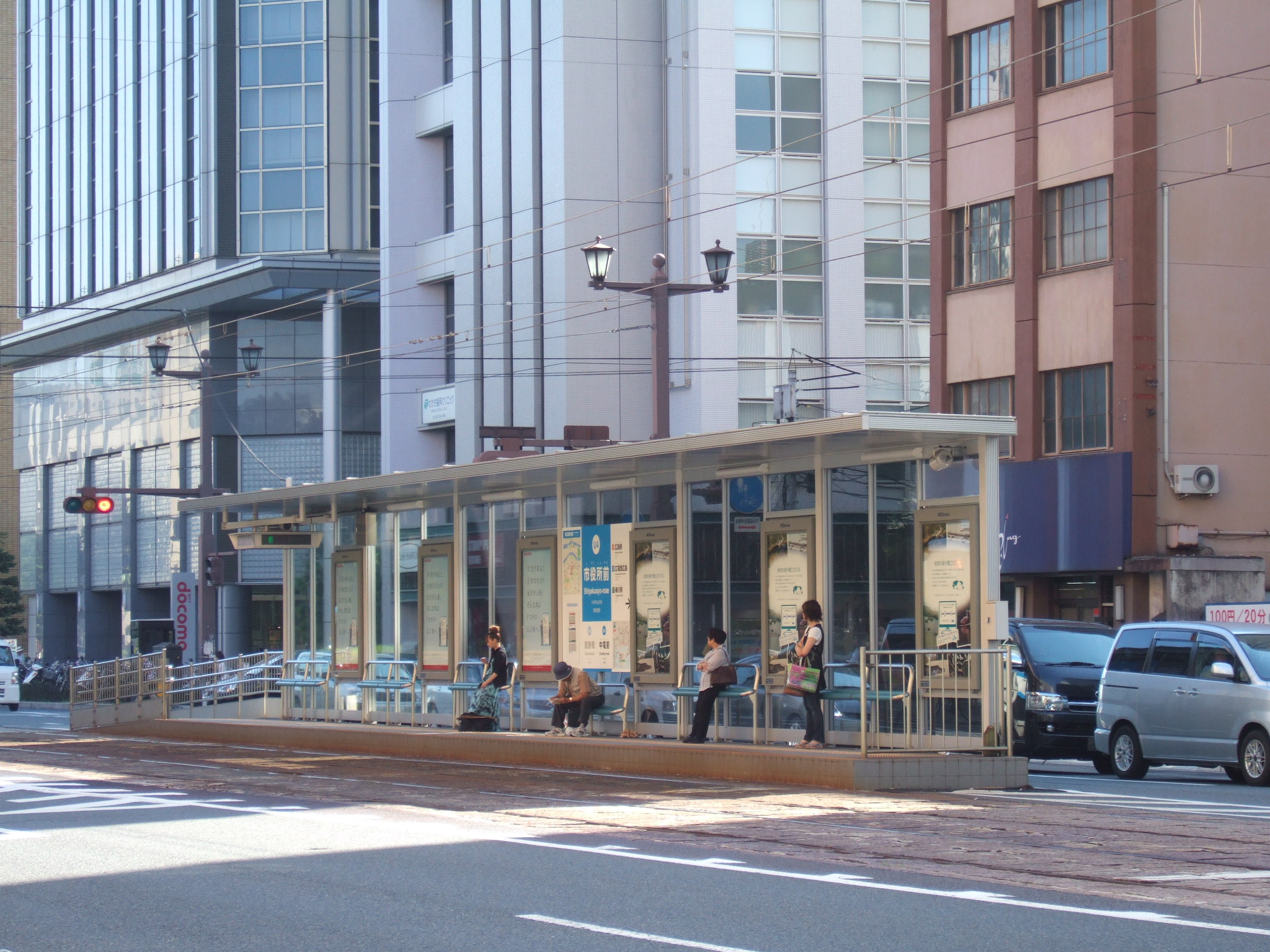

General information
- Location: Ote-machi 4-chome, Naka-ku, Hiroshima; Japan
- Operator: Hiroshima Electric Railway
- Lines: █ Hiroden Ujina Line; Route

Other information
- Station code: U4

History
- Opened: November 23, 1914
Location

Shiyakusho-mae is a Hiroden station (tram stop) on Hiroden Ujina Line located in front of Hiroshima City Hall, Ote-machi 4-chome, Naka-ku, Hiroshima.

== Routes ==
From Shiyakusho-mae Station, there are three of Hiroden Streetcar routes.

- Hiroshima Station - Hiroshima Port Route
- Hiroden-nishi-hiroshima - Hiroshima Port Route
- Yokogawa Station - Hiroden-honsha-mae Route

== Connections ==
█ Ujina Line

Chuden-mae — Shiyakusho-mae — Takanobashi

== Around station ==
- Hiroshima City Hall
- Hiroshima Naka Ward Office
- JA Building
- Hiroshima Prefectural Hiroshima Kokutaiji High School
- Hiroshima Prefectural Nishi High School
- Hiroshima Chuo Yubin-kyoku - main post office
- Hiroshima City Naka Ward Library

== History ==
- Opened as "Makomo-bashi" tram stop, named from the bridge "Makomo", on November 23, 1914.
- Renamed to "Kōkaidō-mae", named from "Hiroshima public hall" - hormer International Conference Center Hiroshima, in 1919.
- Closed from June 10, 1944 to October 31, 1946.
- Reopened and renamed to the present name "Shiyakusho-mae", named from "Hiroshima City Office", on November 1, 1946

== See also ==
- Hiroden lines and routes
