= Hondōri Station (Hiroden) =

Tram stop in Hiroshima, Japan

Coordinates: 34°23′37″N 132°27′26″E

Hondōri 本通
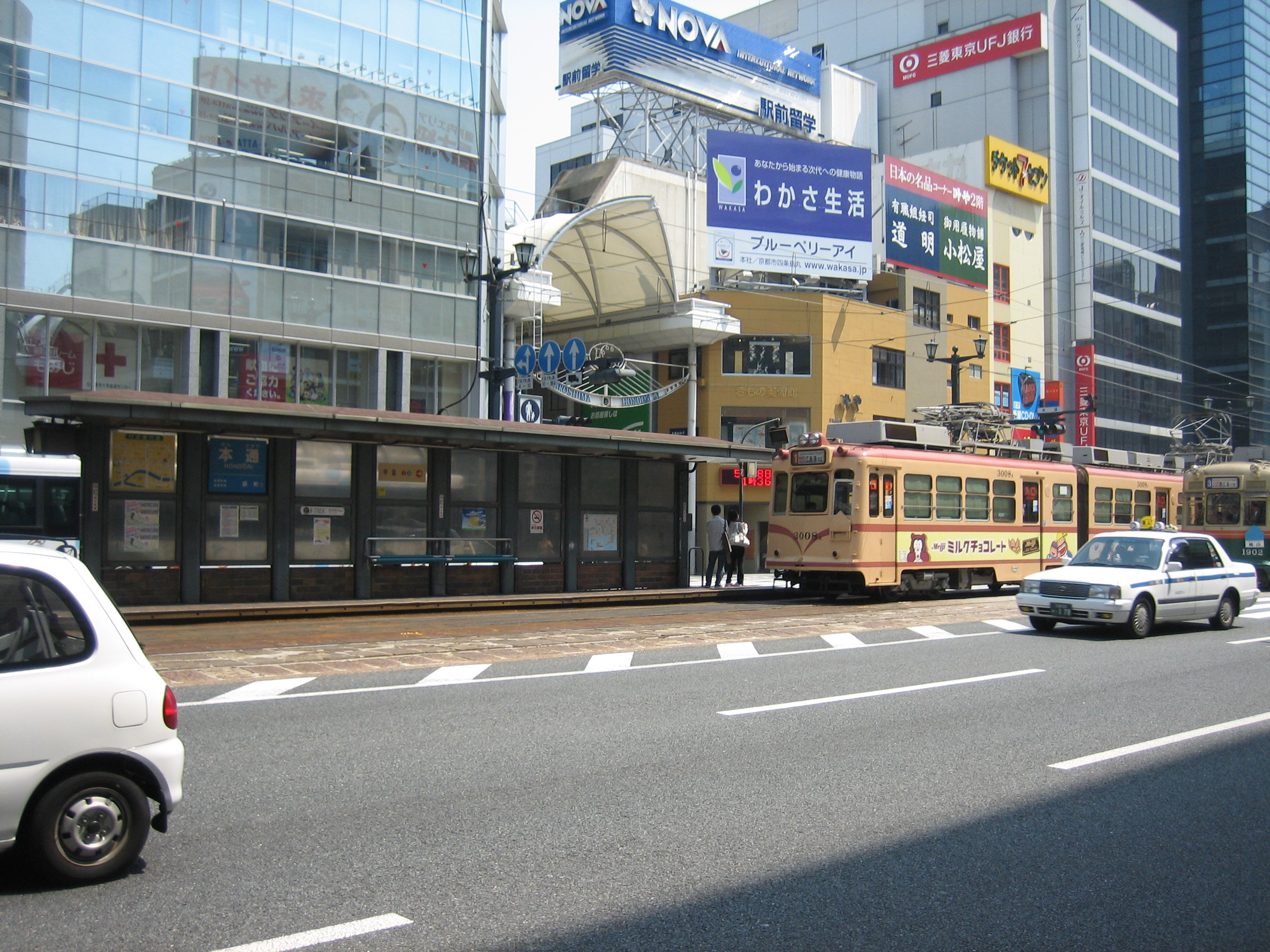

General information
- Location: Hondōri, Naka-ku, Hiroshima; Japan
- Operator: Hiroshima Electric Railway
- Lines: █ Hiroden Ujina Line; Route
- Connections: █ Astram Line at Hondōri Station

Other information
- Station code: U1

History
- Opened: November 23, 1912
Location

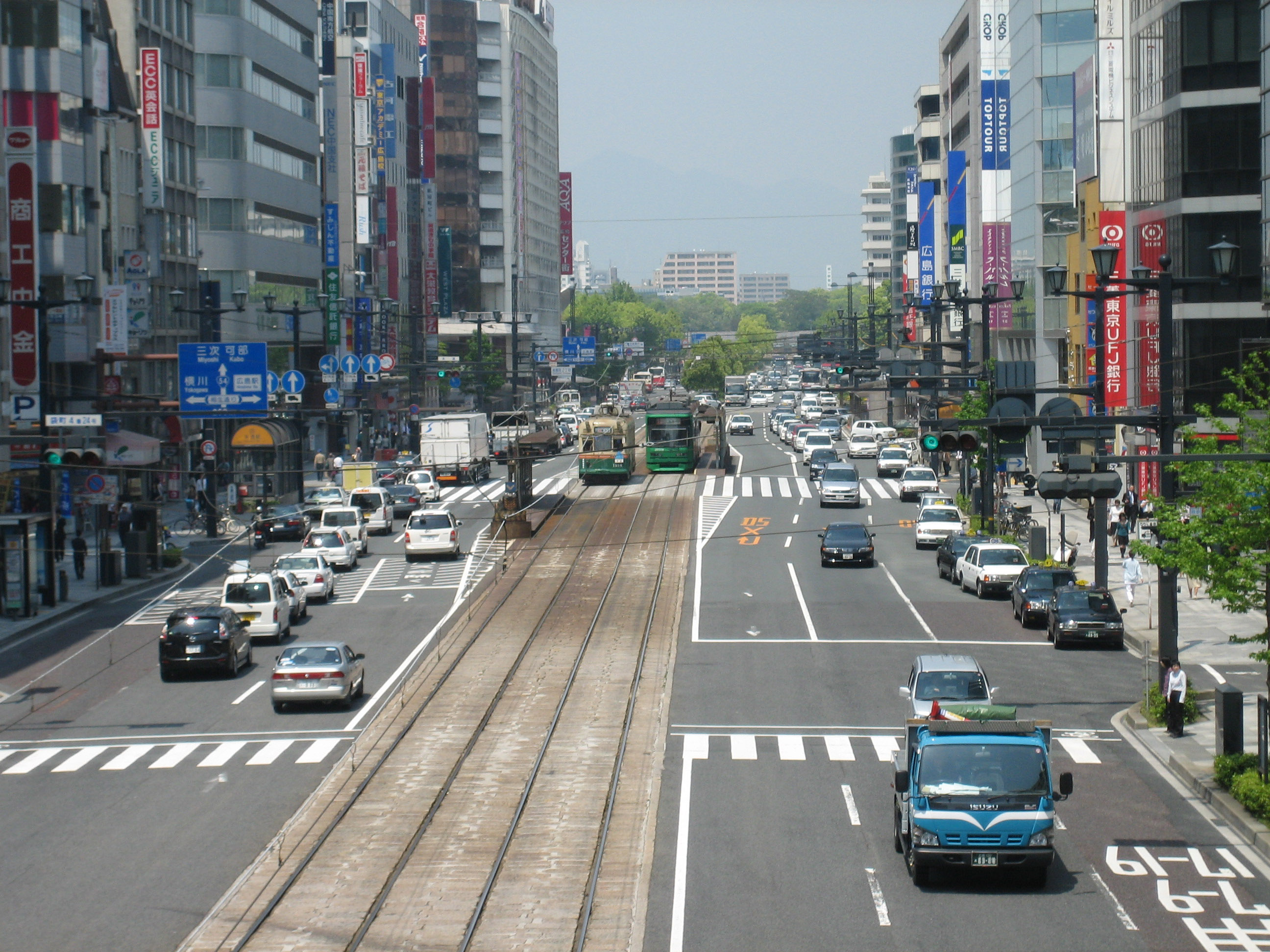
Looking up Hondōri Station from south to north, above on the Rijyō-dōri

Hondōri is a Hiroden station on Hiroden Ujina Line located in Hondōri, Naka-ku, Hiroshima.

== Routes ==
From Hondōri Station, there are three of Hiroden Streetcar routes.

- Hiroden Streetcar Route 1
- Hiroden Streetcar Route 3
- Hiroden Streetcar Route 7

== Connections ==
█ Ujina Line

Kamiya-cho-higashi — Hondōri — Fukuro-machi

Kamiya-cho-nishi — Hondōri — Fukuro-machi

== Other services connections ==
█ Astram Line

- Astram Line Connections at Astram Hondōri Station

== Around station ==
- Hiroshima Peace Memorial Park
- Hiroshima Hondōri Shōtengai
- Hiroshima Andersen
- Hiroshima Kenmin Bunka Center
  - Rijyo Kaikan Hotel

== History ==
- Opened as "Kawaya-machi" on November 23, 1912.
- Service was stopped from June 10, 1944, to September 11, 1945.
- Service restarted on September 12, 1945.
- Renamed to the present station name "Hondōri", on April 1, 1965.

== See also ==
- Hiroden lines and routes
