= Takaki Bakery =

Bakery in Hiroshima, Japan

Takaki Bakery Co., Ltd. 株式会社タカキベーカリー
- Company type: Public
- Industry: Food Industry
- Founded: August 1948
- Headquarters: Aki-ku, Hiroshima
- Products: Bread/Pastry/Sandwich/Cake/ Frozen Bread and Cake
- Number of employees: 702 (May 2006)
- Parent: Andersen Institute of Bread and Life Co., Ltd.
- Website: www.takaki-bakery.co.jp

Takaki Bakery Co., Ltd. (株式会社タカキベーカリー, Kabushiki-gaisha Takaki Bakery) is a Japanese bakery based in Hiroshima, Japan. It was the first company of the Andersen Institute of Bread and Life group of companies.

== History ==
The original bakery was founded in Hijiyama-Hon-machi, Hiroshima by Mr. and Mrs. Takaki in August 1948. Bread of Takaki (株式会社タカキのパン, Kabushiki-gaisha Takaki-no-Pan) was established in December 1951. Bread of Takaki began to operate their new bread factory in Senogawa, Aki-gun, Hiroshima Prefecture in March 1961. In 1962 the bakery was renamed "Takaki Bakery". They opened a restaurant and bakery called "Andersen" in a building bought from Mitsui Bank in Hiroshima in October 1967. The bank building, built in 1925, had been damaged by the atomic bomb blast during World War II. In April 1970 they began to operate a frozen bread factory, and later that year opened another shop called "Aoyama-Andersen" in Aoyama, Tokyo. The business eventually expanded to operate shops throughout the Kantō region.

"Hiroshima-Andersen" was visited by Margrethe II of Denmark in April 1981 and by Frederik, King of Denmark in November 1987. The company operates a restaurant and bakery in San Mateo, California, opened in 1981, and two bakeries in Copenhagen, Denmark.

== Andersen Group ==
The Andersen Group, formally known as Andersen Institute of Bread and Life Co., Ltd. (株式会社アンデルセン・パン生活文化研究所, Kabushiki-gaisha Andersen Pan Seikatsu Bunka Kenkyujo), was officially formed in 2003 as a holding company. In addition to Takaki Bakery, the group operates shops under the names Hiroshima Andersen, Aoyama Andersen, ANDERSEN, M's bakery, and bread & hygge. As of 2006, Andersen Group employed 2,428 persons. The US branch of Andersen Bakery is located in Hayward, California.

== Origin of name and link to Denmark ==
The "Andersen" in the companies title (Andersen Bakery/Institute of Bread and Life Co., Ltd.) is in reference to Hans Christian Andersen. The inspiration for making Danish pastries, and 'European style' bread, came from a study trip to Denmark in 1959, by founder Shunsuke Takaki. Seiichi Takaki, president of Andersen Institute of Bread & Life, has further strengthened ties with Denmark by donating 200 Japanese cherry trees to the municipality of Copenhagen. The trees were planted in Langelinie park.
