= Food theme park =

Themed food hall, typically in Japan

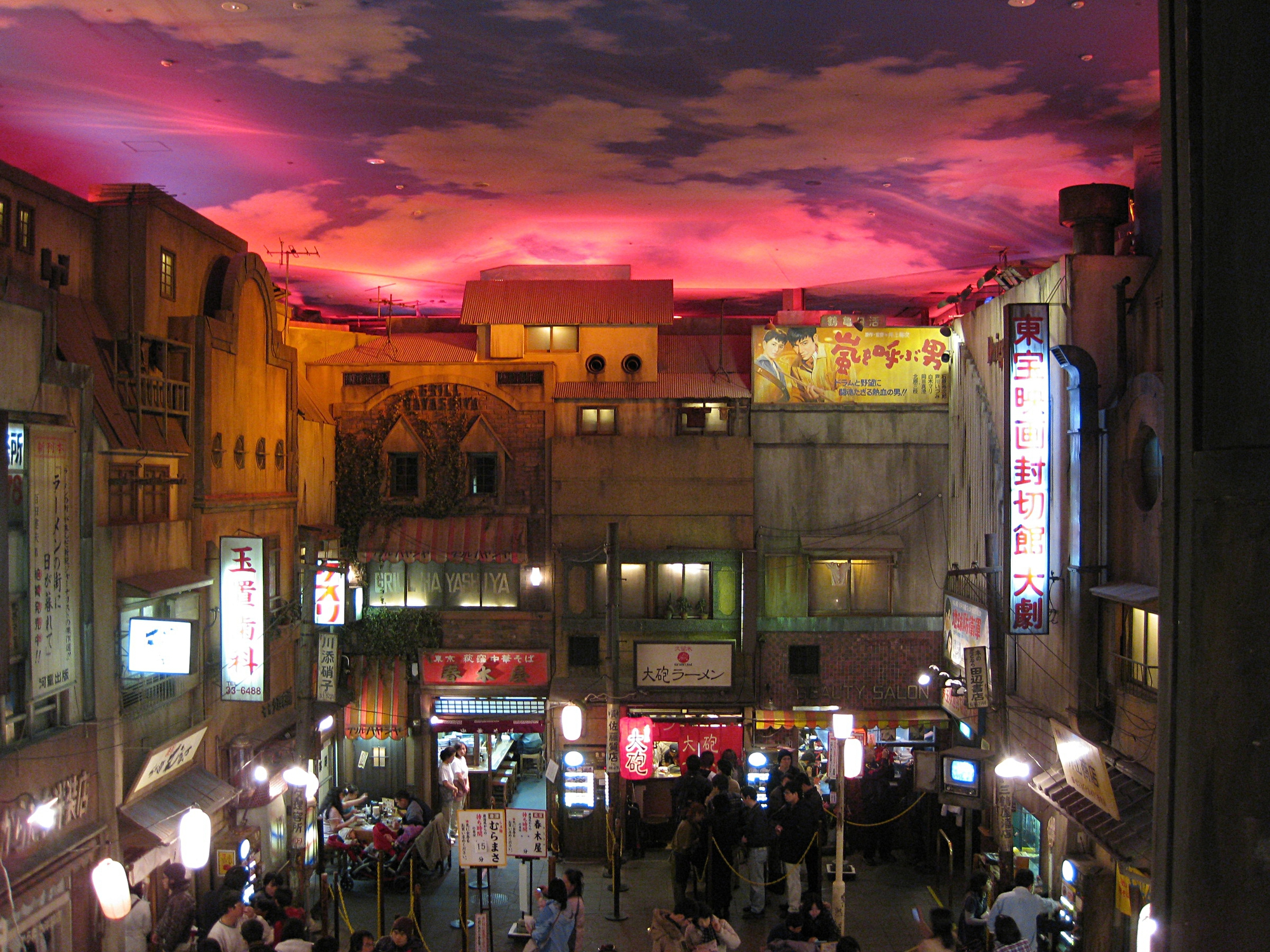
Ramen stalls in the Shin-Yokohama Rāmen Museum

A food theme park (フードテーマパーク, fūdo tēma pāku), also called a food museum, is generally a single place with many food shops selling the same kind of food, or a food 'theme'. A food theme park, unlike a conventional theme park, is located indoors. Food theme parks are mostly located in Japan where they are called by the English figure of speech.

== Notable food theme parks ==
Name	Location	External link
Jiyugaoka Sweets Forest	Midorigaoka, Meguro, Tokyo, Japan	(Japanese)
Namco Namja Town	Ikebukuro, Toshima, Tokyo, Japan	(Japanese)
Okonomi-mura	Naka-ku, Hiroshima, Japan	(Japanese)
Shin-Yokohama Rāmen Museum	Shin-Yokohama, Kōhoku-ku, Yokohama, Japan	(English)
