= Jan Letzel =

Czech architect

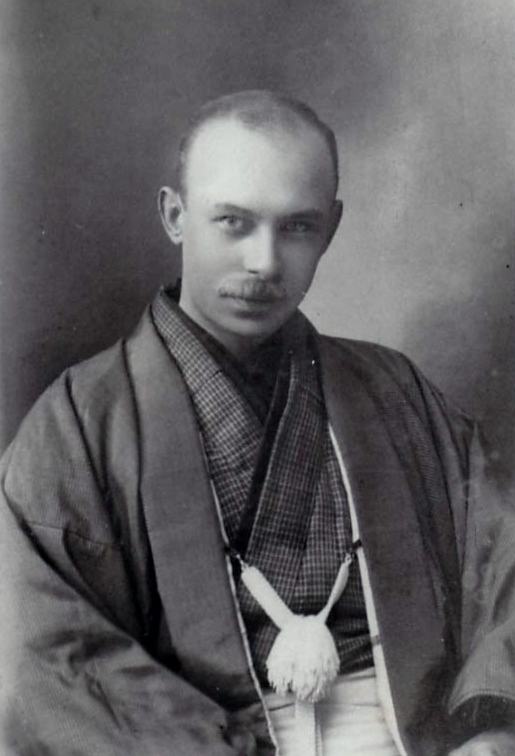
- Jan Letzel in kimono in Japan
- Born: 9 April 1880; Náchod, Bohemia, Austria-Hungary
- Died: 26 December 1925 (aged 45); Prague, Czechoslovakia
- Occupation: Architect

Jan Letzel (9 April 1880 – 26 December 1925) was a Czech architect who was active in early 20th century Japan. He is most famous for designing the Hiroshima Products Exhibition Hall that was partially destroyed in the atomic bombing of the city. The ruins of the Exhibition Hall is now the Hiroshima Peace Memorial, also known as the A-Bomb Dome, a UNESCO World Heritage Site.

== Biography ==
Jan Letzel was born in the town of Náchod, Bohemia. His parents were hotel owners Jan Letzel and his wife Walburga, née Havlíčková. After completion of training in the construction department of the Higher Vocational School in 1899, he took the post of assistant in the Department of Civil Engineering of the State Industrial School in Pardubice. In 1901 he won a scholarship to study architecture at the School of Applied Arts in Prague, where he studied for three years under Jan Kotěra, one of the founders of modern Czech architecture. In 1902 and 1903 he undertook study tours in Bohemia, Dalmatia, Montenegro and Herzegovina. From June 1904 to August 1905 he worked at architectural firm Quido Bělský in Prague. At the same time he designed and built a sanatorium and a pavilion in the Art Nouveau style in Mšené-lázně. In October 1905 he received his mediation and worked in Cairo for a while. In the spring of 1907 he went back to Prague after visiting Rome, Milan, Venice, and other Italian cities. Letzel's next work was in Japan. After a short stay in Prague and Náchod, he arrived in Tokyo in June 1907, where he worked at a French architectural firm.

Letzel and his friend Karel Hora founded their own architectural firm in 1910 in Tokyo. In the next few years he designed about 40 buildings, including the French school, Sacre Coeur in Tokyo, the Jesuit College, the German embassy, and several hotels and office buildings. His most famous design was the huge administrative building of the Japanese Chamber of Commerce and Industry in Hiroshima, now the Hiroshima Peace Memorial. Hiroshima at that time was dominated by two-story wooden buildings, and the Promotional Hall, with its large size soon became one of Hiroshima's most striking landmarks. It became famous after surviving the atomic attack on the city in 1945. It was rededicated, still as a ruin, as the Hiroshima Peace Memorial, otherwise known as the A-Bomb Dome. Letzel himself never lived to see the transformation of his Industrial Promotion Hall into the A-Bomb Dome.

When his partner Karel Hora returned to Bohemia in 1913, Letzel led the architecture firm alone, but in 1915 he had to give up the work due to World War I. In 1918, Czechoslovakia became an independent country; Letzel was appointed commercial attaché at the Czechoslovak embassy in Tokyo in 1919. In March 1920 he returned home, but went back to Japan few months later for his attaché post.

In November 1922, Letzel traveled to Japan and later witnessed the destruction of many of his buildings in the 1923 Great Kantō earthquake. Deeply disappointed, he returned to Prague in November 1923 and died a few years later at the age of 45. The firebombing raids on Japan also destroyed many of his buildings, especially those in major cities such as Kobe or Tokyo. Much of Letzel's work in Japan did not survive the 20th century.

== Notable works ==
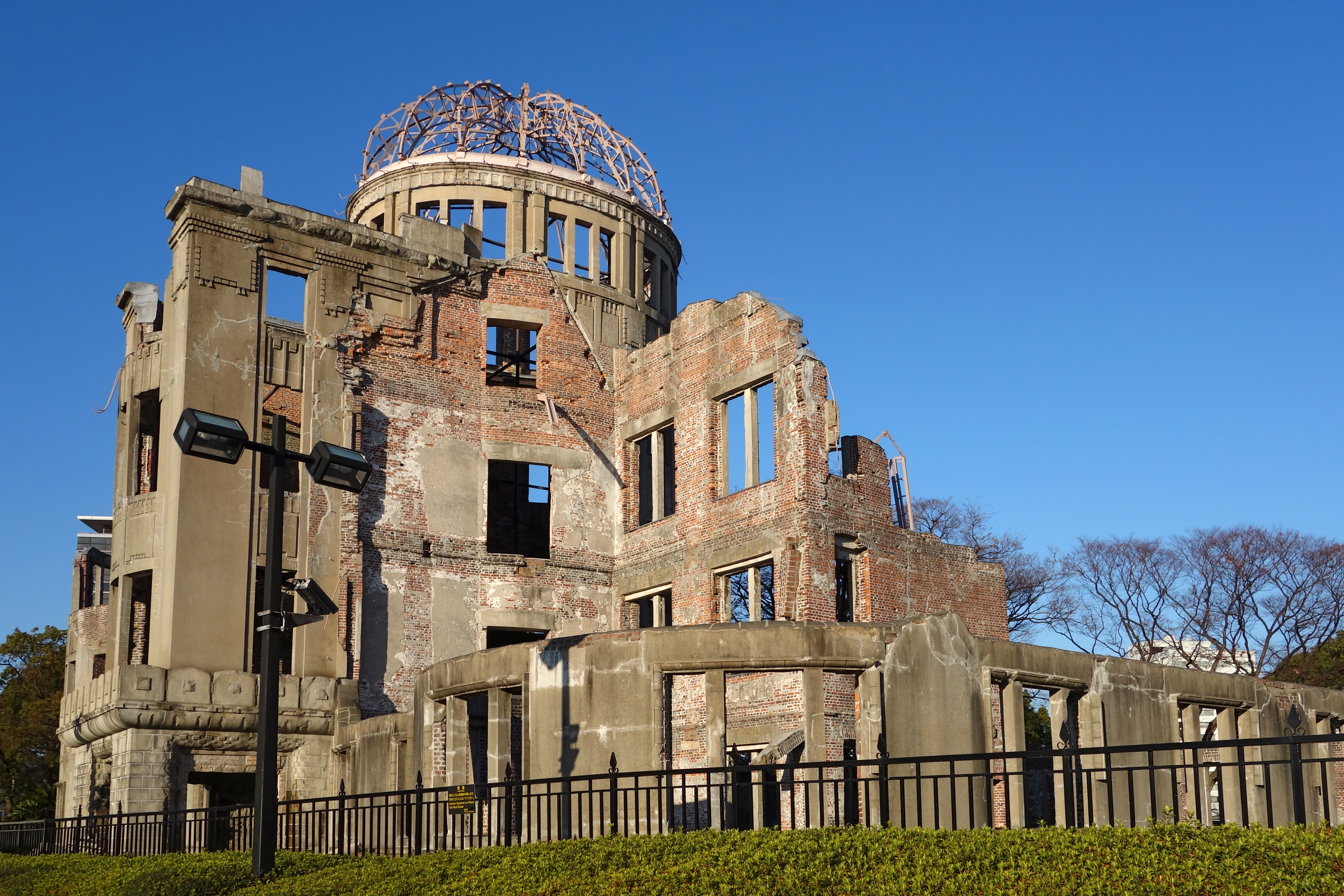
The Hiroshima Peace Memorial in its current condition.

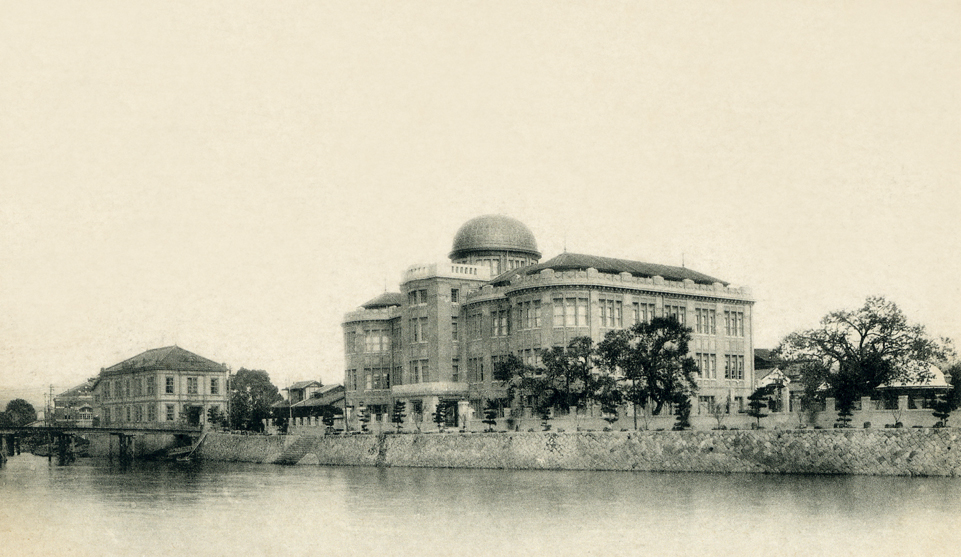
The Hiroshima Products Exhibition Hall in its original condition, 1920s

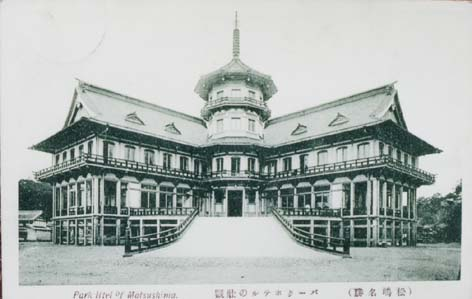
Matsushima Park Hotel, co-designed by Letzel and Karel Hora, burnt down in a 1969 fire.

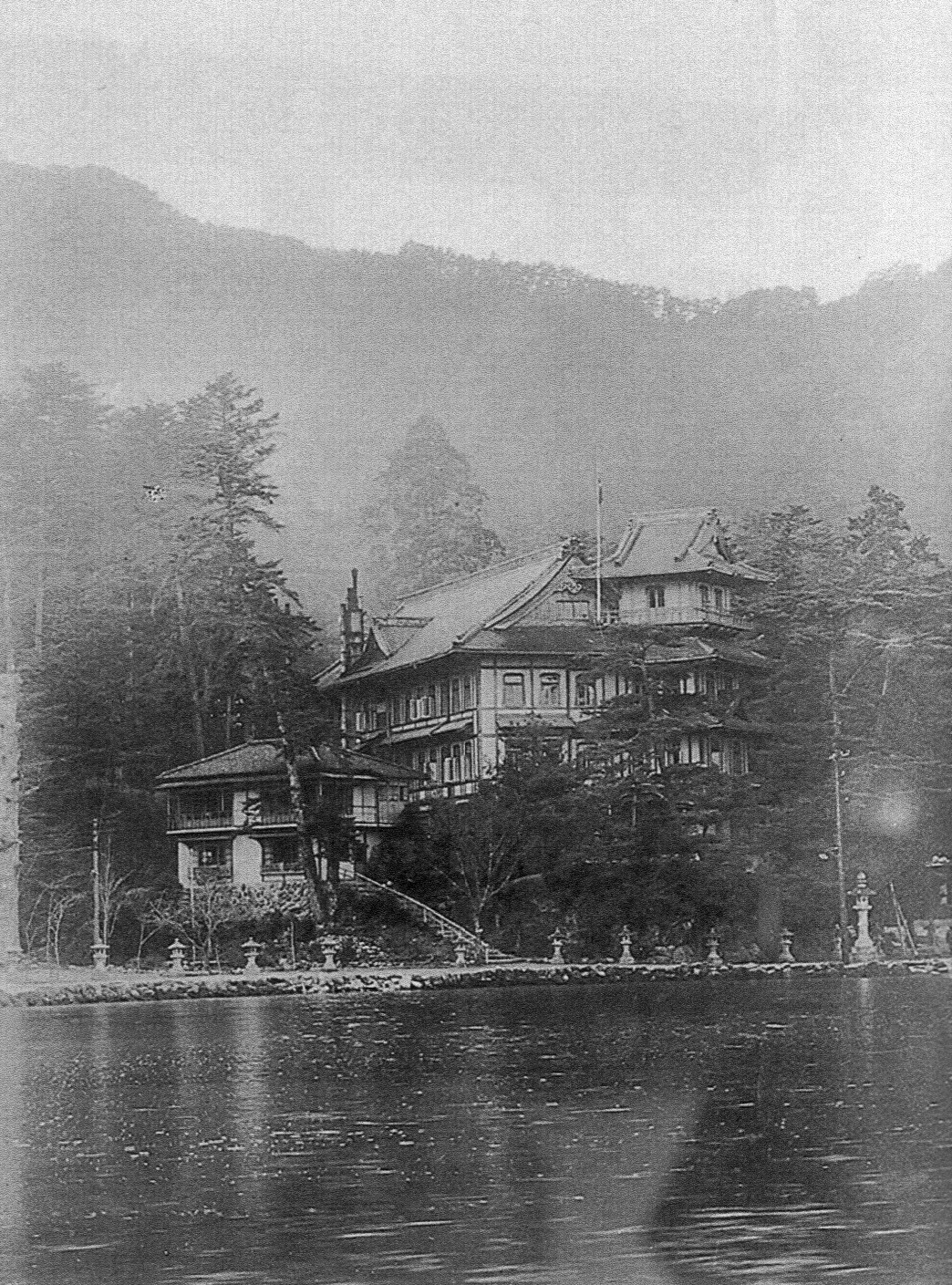
Miyajima Hotel in 1917, the building was occupied by the British Commonwealth Occupation Force when it was accidentally burnt down on 31 August 1952

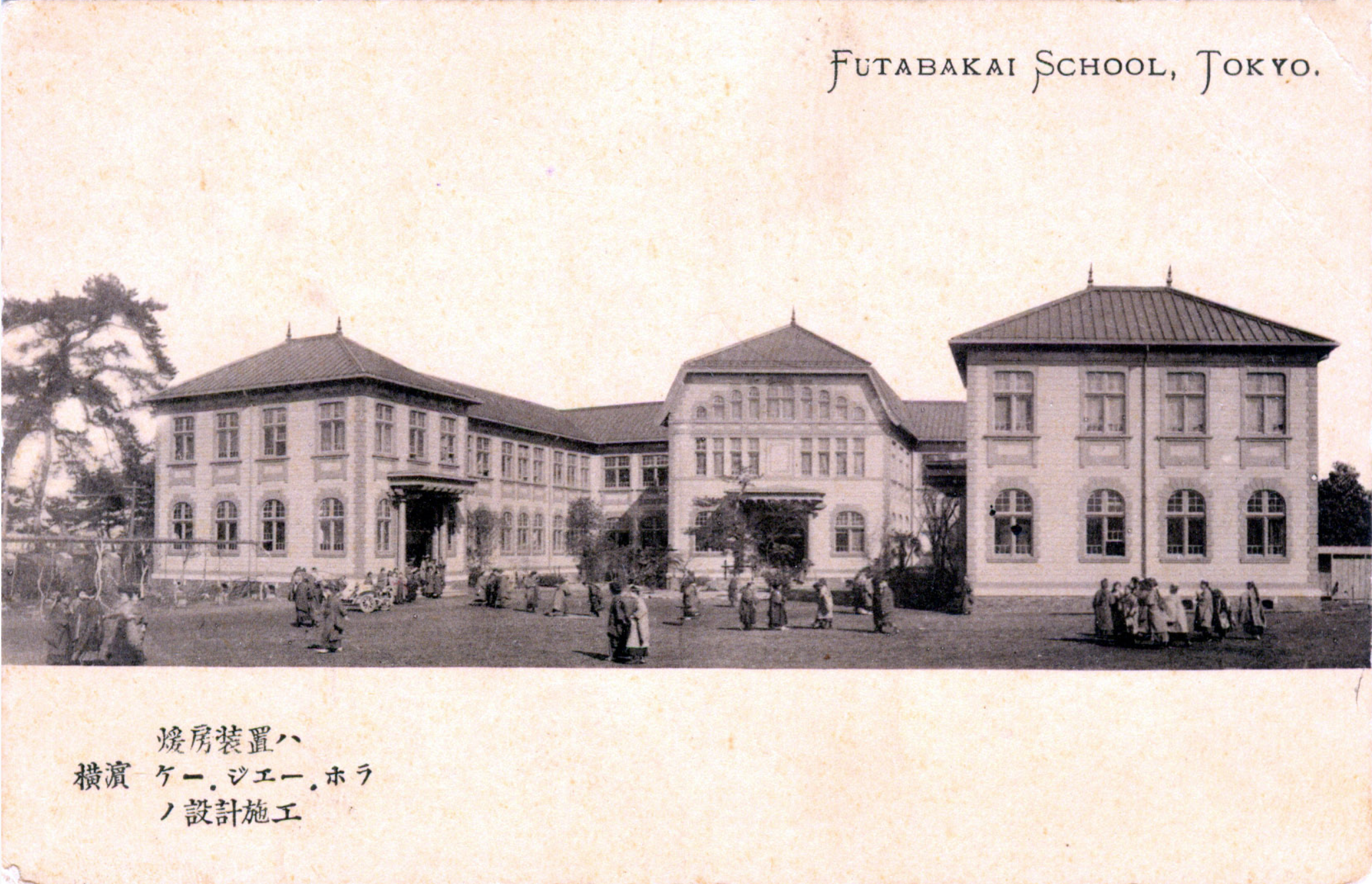
The Tokyo Futabakai School in 1910, destroyed in the 1945 bombing of Tokyo.

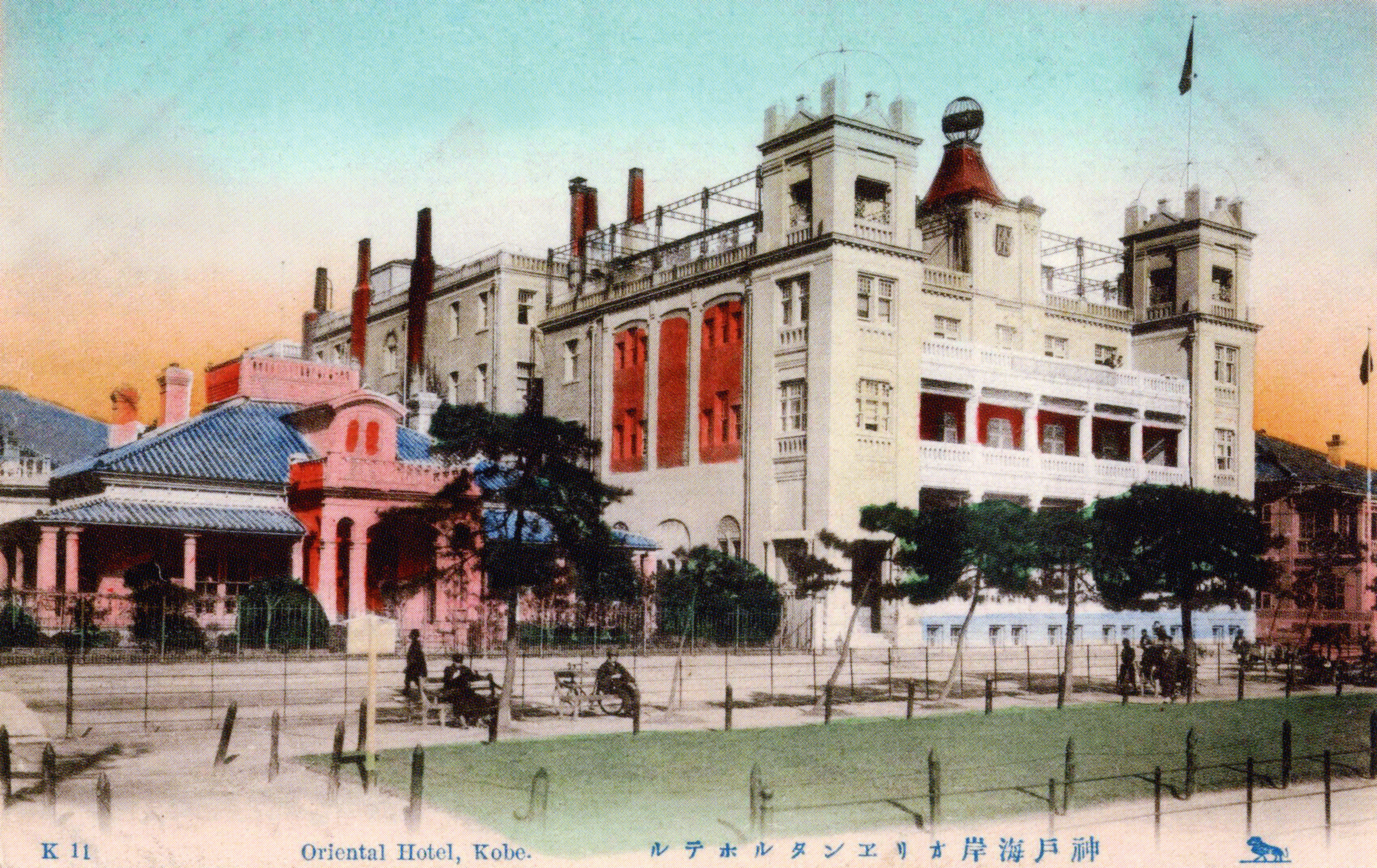
The old Kobe Oriental Hotel in 1907, which Letzel co-designed with Georg de Lalande. Destroyed in the 1945 bombing of Kobe.

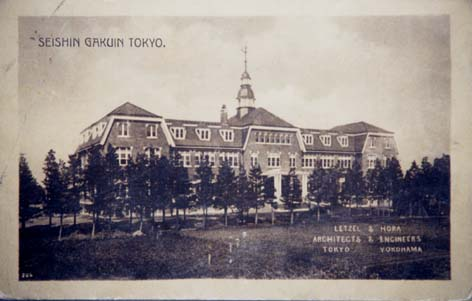
The old University of the Sacred Heart building in 1909, destroyed in the 1923 Great Kantō earthquake.

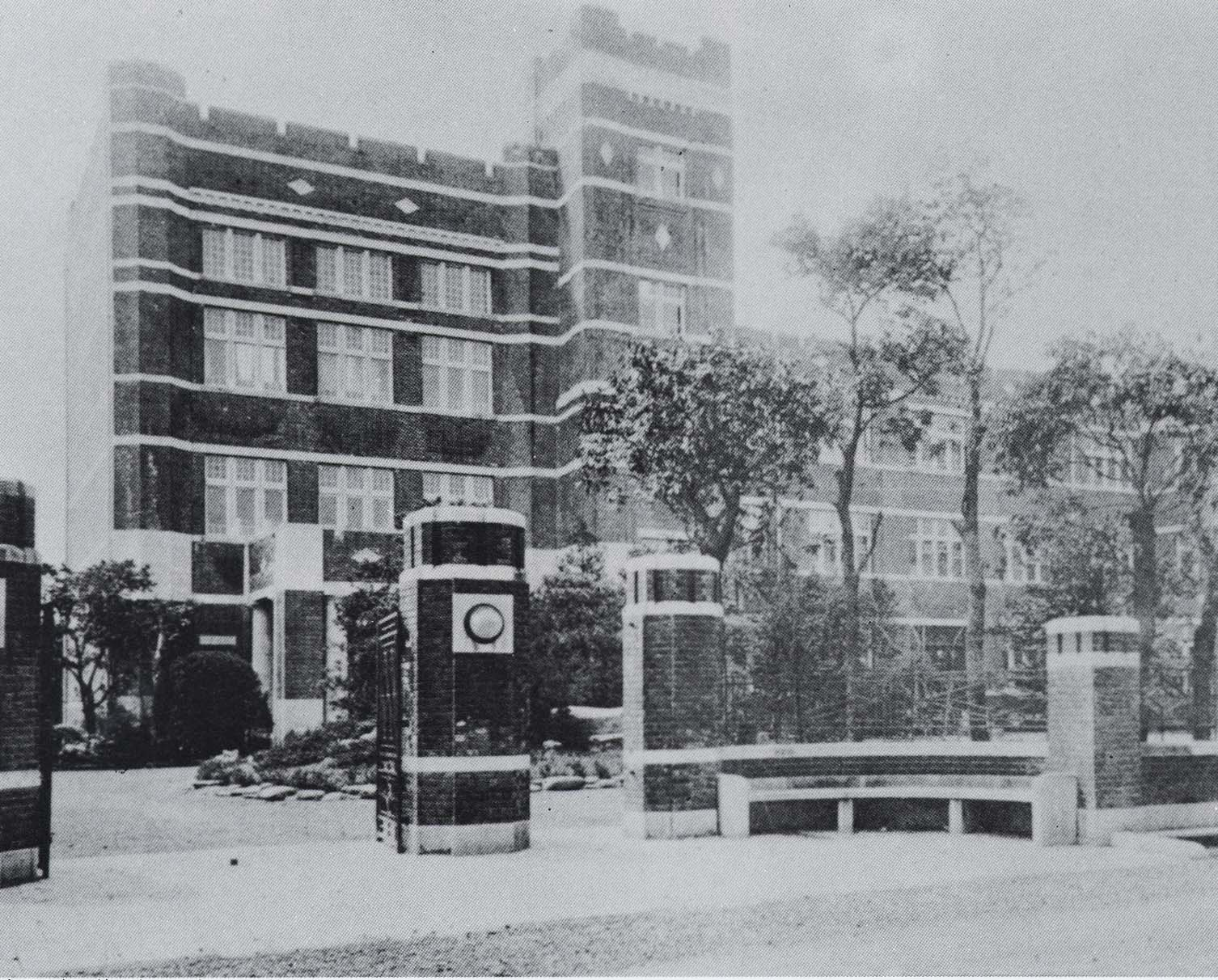
Number 1 campus building of Sophia University, 1914

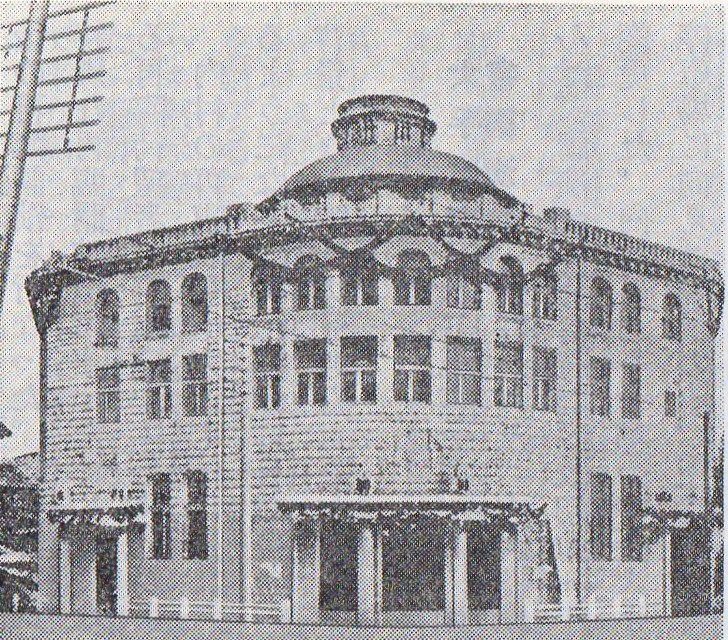
The Dai Nippon Medical Hall in the Chiyoda ward of Tokyo circa 1919, damaged in the bombing of Tokyo and demolished.

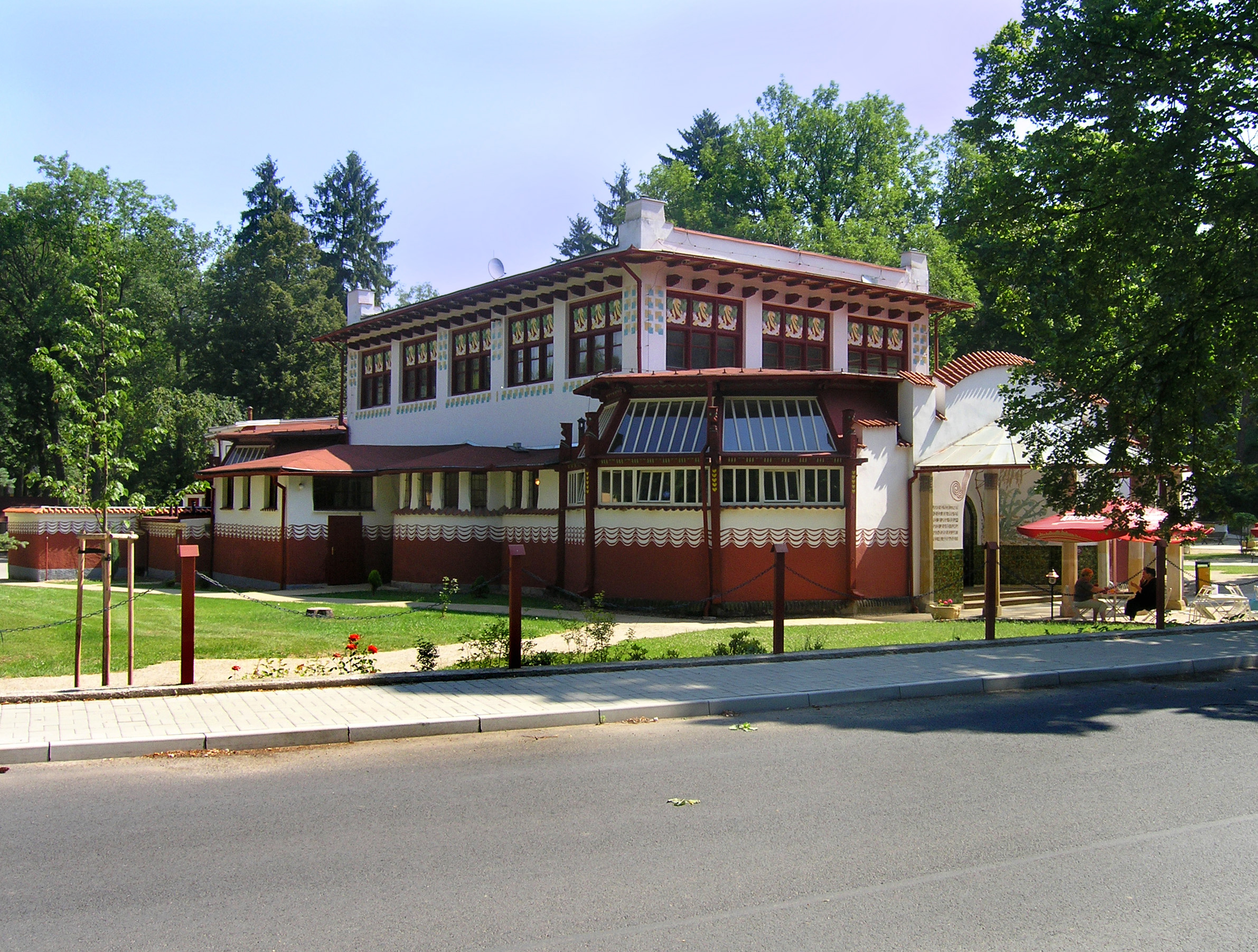
Pavilon Dvorana (Mšené-lázně, Czechia) in 1905, still standing.
