= Letzel =

Letzel is a surname. Notable people with the surname include:

- Jan Letzel (1880–1925), Czech architect
- Heio Letzel, German filmmaker

== See also ==
- 6266 Letzel, main-belt asteroid discovered on 1986
