= Antonín Hudeček =

Czech painter (1872–1941)

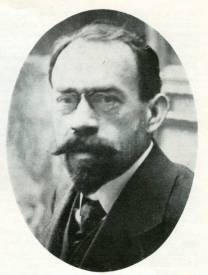
Antonín Hudeček (1910s)

Antonín Hudeček (14 January 1872 – 11 August 1941) was a Czech landscape painter.

== Biography ==
Hudeček was born on 14 January 1872 in Ředhošť, Bohemia (now part of Mšené-lázně, Czech Republic). After completing his primary education in Roudnice, he studied at the Academy of Fine Arts, Prague, with Maximilian Pirner and Václav Brožík; devoting himself mostly to figure painting. From 1891 to 1893, he continued his studies in Munich with Otto Seitz. He opened a workshop in Prague in 1895.

Shortly after, he joined a group of painters, led by Julius Mařák, that went for plein aire painting excursions; mostly in the area around Okoř. In 1898, he held his first major exhibition at the Mánes Union of Fine Arts, followed by a showing in Vienna in 1900. He made a lengthy trip to Italy and Sicily with Jan Preisler in 1902, returning to Prague by way of Cologne.

After 1909, he worked in the areas near Police nad Metují and paid several visits to Rügen. From 1920, he was a regular visitor to Banská Bystrica in the Tatras. In 1927, he settled in the village of Častolovice, where he lived until his death. He was named a member of the Austrian Academy of Sciences in 1930, and received their award for lifetime achievement. The following year, he and his son, Jiří (1910–1971), an aspiring artist, made an extended stay in Venice. He died on 11 August 1941 in Častolovice.

== Selected paintings ==
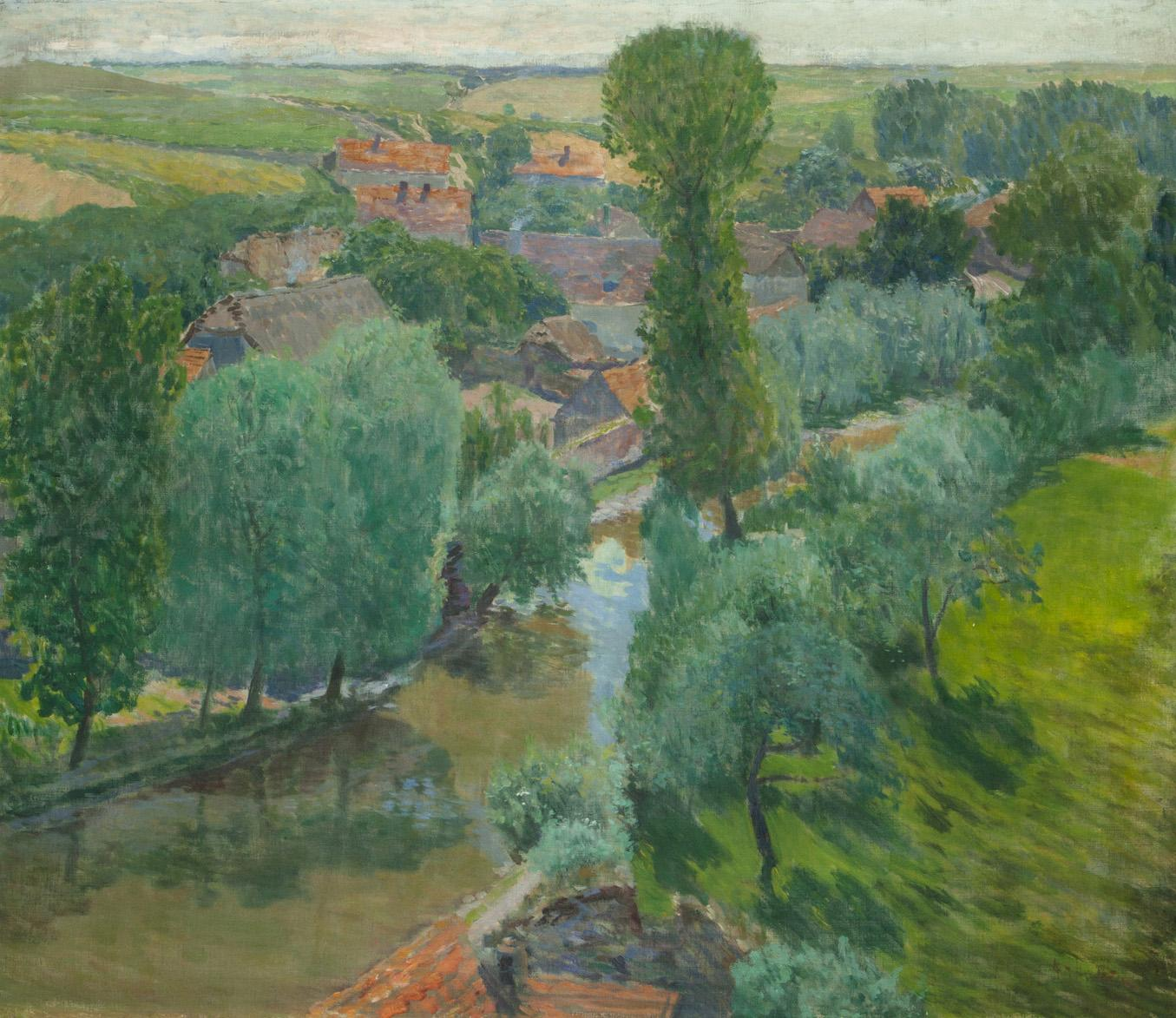
View of Okoř

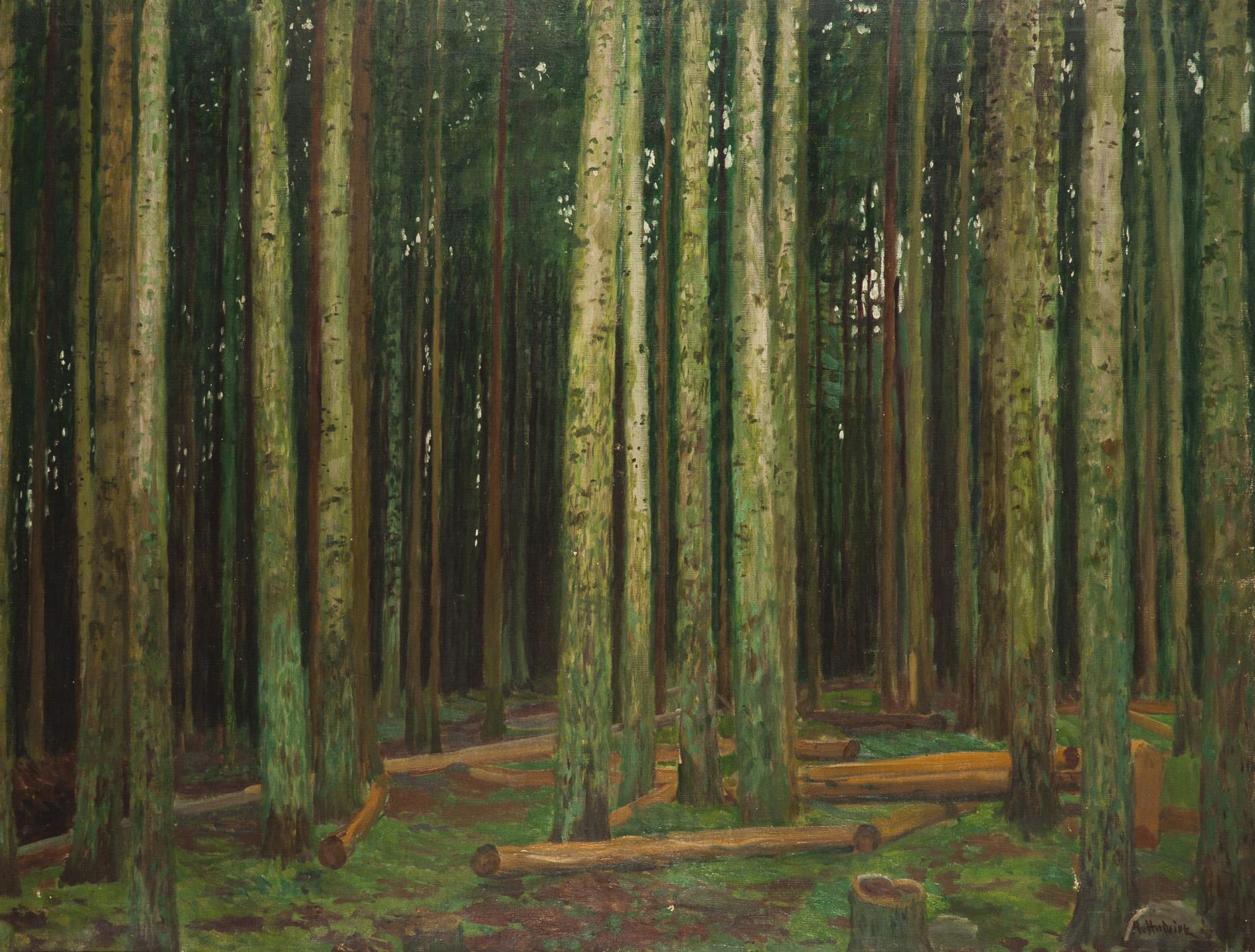
Heart of the Forest

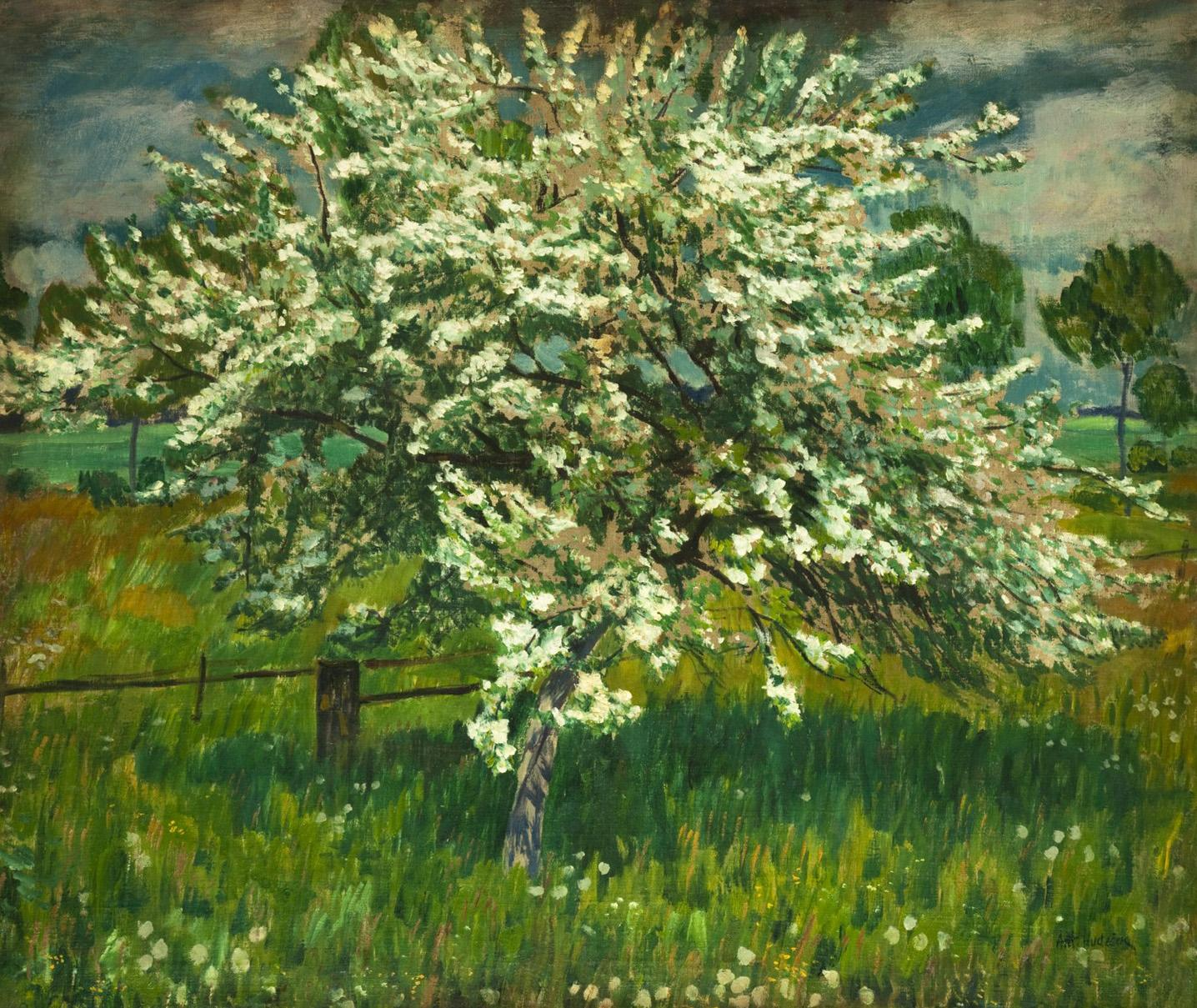
Blossoming Apple Tree
