= František Bayer =

Czech zoologist, paleontologist and teacher

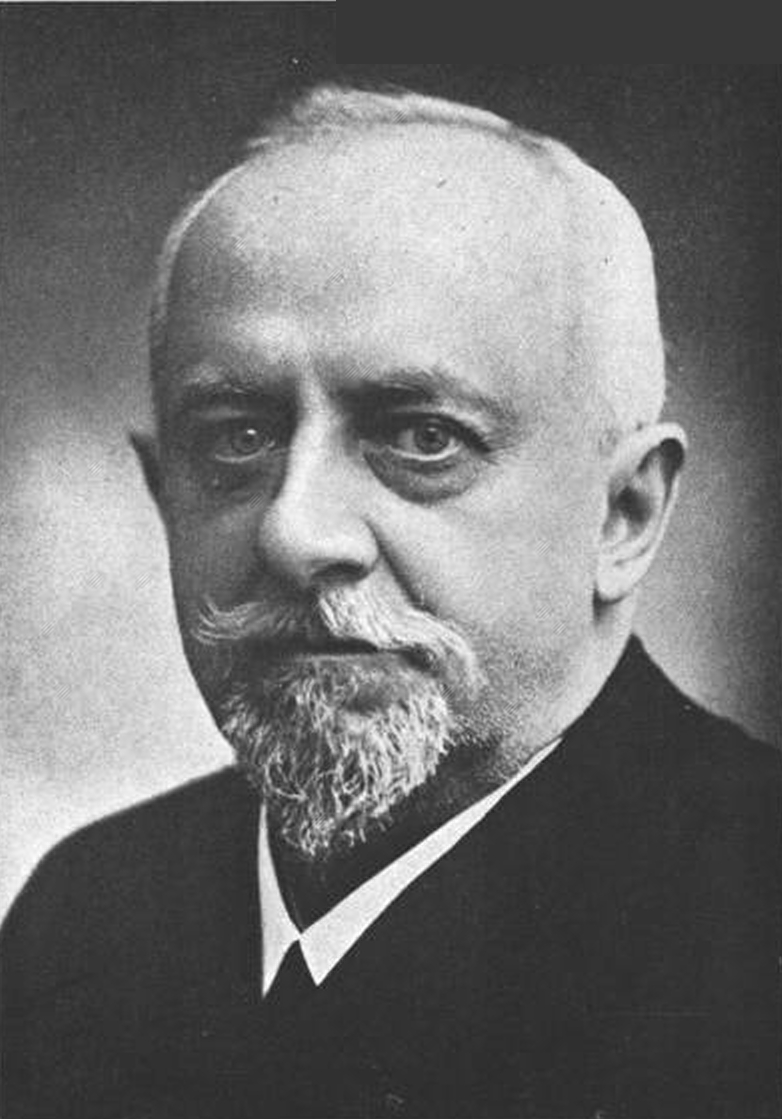
- Bayer in later life
- Born: 15 June 1854; Mšené-lázně, Bohemia, Austrian Empire
- Died: 5 April 1936 (aged 81); Prague, Czechoslovakia
- Known for: Paleontology; Osteology; Zoology teaching
- Scientific career
- Academic advisors: Antonín Frič

Signature
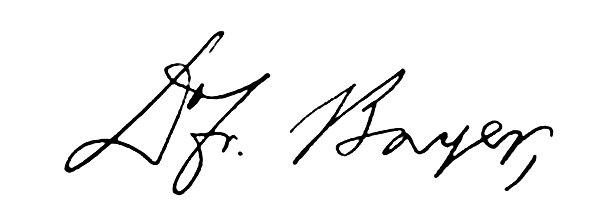

František Bayer (15 June 1854 – 5 April 1936) was a Czech zoologist, paleontologist and teacher. He taught at secondary schools before becoming director of the Jiráskovo Gymnasium in Prague. In his spare time he worked on the Cretaceous vertebrates of the region. He specialized in the fishes although he also described birds, amphibians and reptiles. The taxonomic affinities of some of the taxa he described have since been redetermined. He also took an interest in music, both composing and writing about music.

== Biography ==
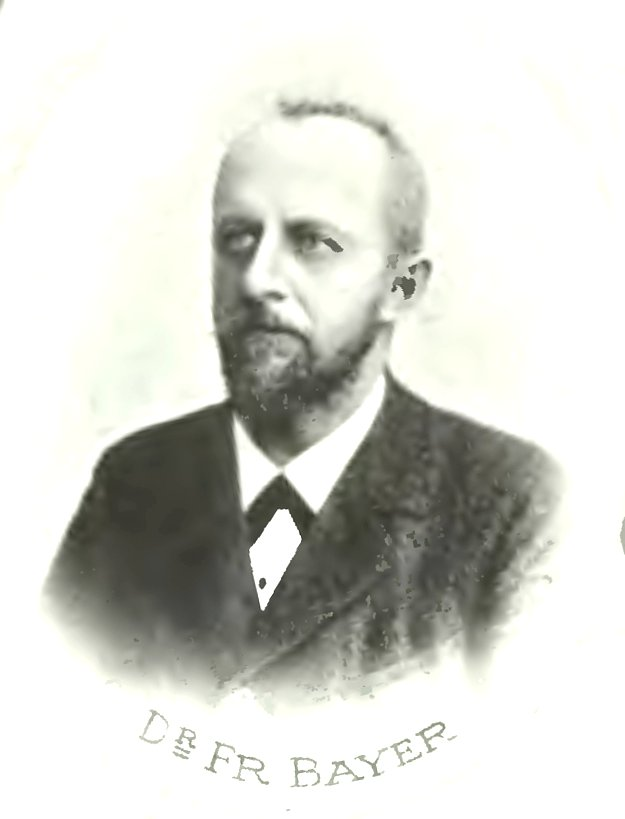
Bayer in 1899

Bayer was born in Mšené-lázně and studied at the Písek gymnasium (1865–1873) before entering the University of Prague. After graduating in the natural sciences and mathematics with physics and obtaining a teaching certificat in 1880 he began to teach in grammar schools. In 1882 he described a bird fossil, Anas basaltica from tuffs near Varnsdorf. It was later placed in the genus Ardea. He described another fossil that he again placed in the genus Anas, A. skalicensis, from Skalice near Litoměřice. He received a doctorate in 1883. He began to teach at the higher gymnasium in Domažlice (1876–1878) as a substitute teacher and then went to Tábor and simultaneously began his studies in osteology and paleontology. An early work on the osteology of frogs was critiqued by František Vejdovský for not examining immature stages. From 1890 to 1892 he taught at Písek. In 1888 he became a member of the Royal Czech Society of Sciences. He made several visits to Germany, the Netherlands, Belgium and London to examine paleontology collections. His most intense period of paleontological activity spanned 1893 to 1902. In 1896 he published a list of Cretaceous reptiles and fishes. In 1907, he became the director of the Jiráskovo Gymnasium. He studied paleontology and went on collecting trips as well as visits to museums. He collaborated with Antonín Frič on paleontological studies. Frič encouraged Bayer to move focus from paleontological osteology to the osteology of extant vertebrates. He wrote on the evolution of the lizard tongue, particularly with an interest in the origin of forked tongues. Frič described the fossil fish Bayeria longipinna in Bayer's honour in 1905. Bayer did not accept the subspecies concept or trinomial nomenclature. Bayer also wrote popular science articles in various periodicals. He edited parts of the Czech edition of Brehms Tierleben dealing with reptiles, amphibians and fishes. He wrote a zoology textbook for secondary schools in 1900 along with Jan Nepomuk Woldřich. In 1925 he became a member of the National Research Council. He also took an interest in music and was a friend of Bedřich Smetana and Antonín Dvořák and composed a few small pieces. He also wrote for the music magazine Dalibor.
