= Oriental Hotel (Kobe, Japan) =

Historic boutique and lifestyle hotel in Kobe, Japan

The Orient Hotel
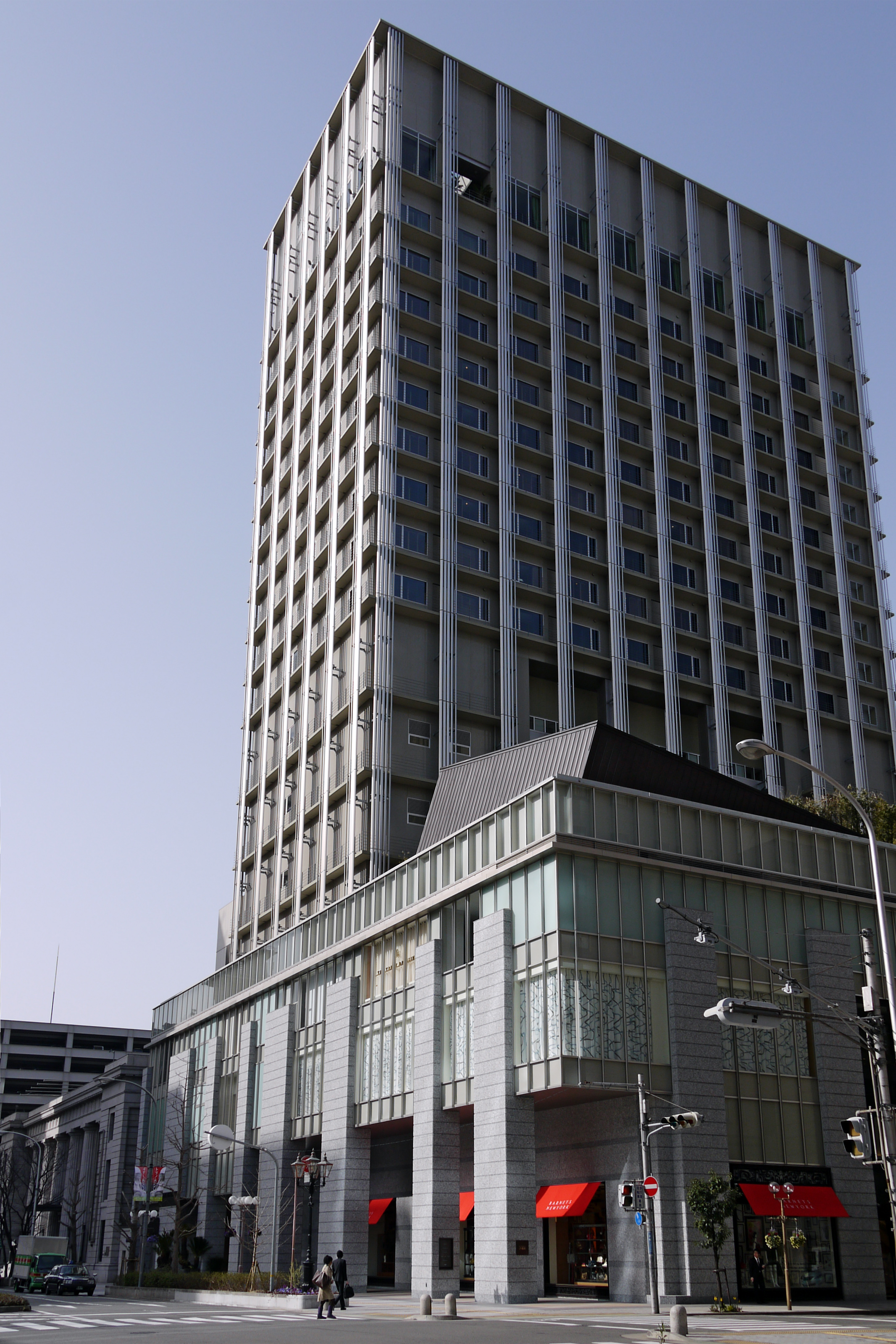

- Location within Japan

General information
- Location: 25 Kyōmachi, Chūō-ku, Kobe, Hyogo, Japan
- Coordinates: 34°41′26.63″N 135°11′57.65″E
- Opening: as late as August 3, 1870 (original); March 3, 2010 (reopening)
- Owner: Renaissance Special Purpose Company
- Operator: Plan·Do·See Co., Ltd.

Technical details
- Floor count: 16
- Floor area: 27,708.15 m^{2} (298,248.0 sq ft) (including the shopping arcade)

Design and construction
- Developer: Mitsui Fudosan Co., Ltd.

Other information
- Number of rooms: 116
- Number of suites: 6
- Number of restaurants: 4
- Parking: 140

Website
- www.orientalhotel.jp/index_eng.html

The Oriental Hotel was a historic hotel in Kobe, Japan opened in 1870 and closed in 1995. The modern Oriental Hotel opened on March 3, 2010 in the Kōbe kyū-kyoryūchi 25 bankan building at the junction of Kyōmachi-suji Avenue and Nakamachi-dōri Street in the former Kobe foreign settlement. It was renamed The Orient in 2026.

== History ==
=== First Oriental Hotel (1870-1995) ===
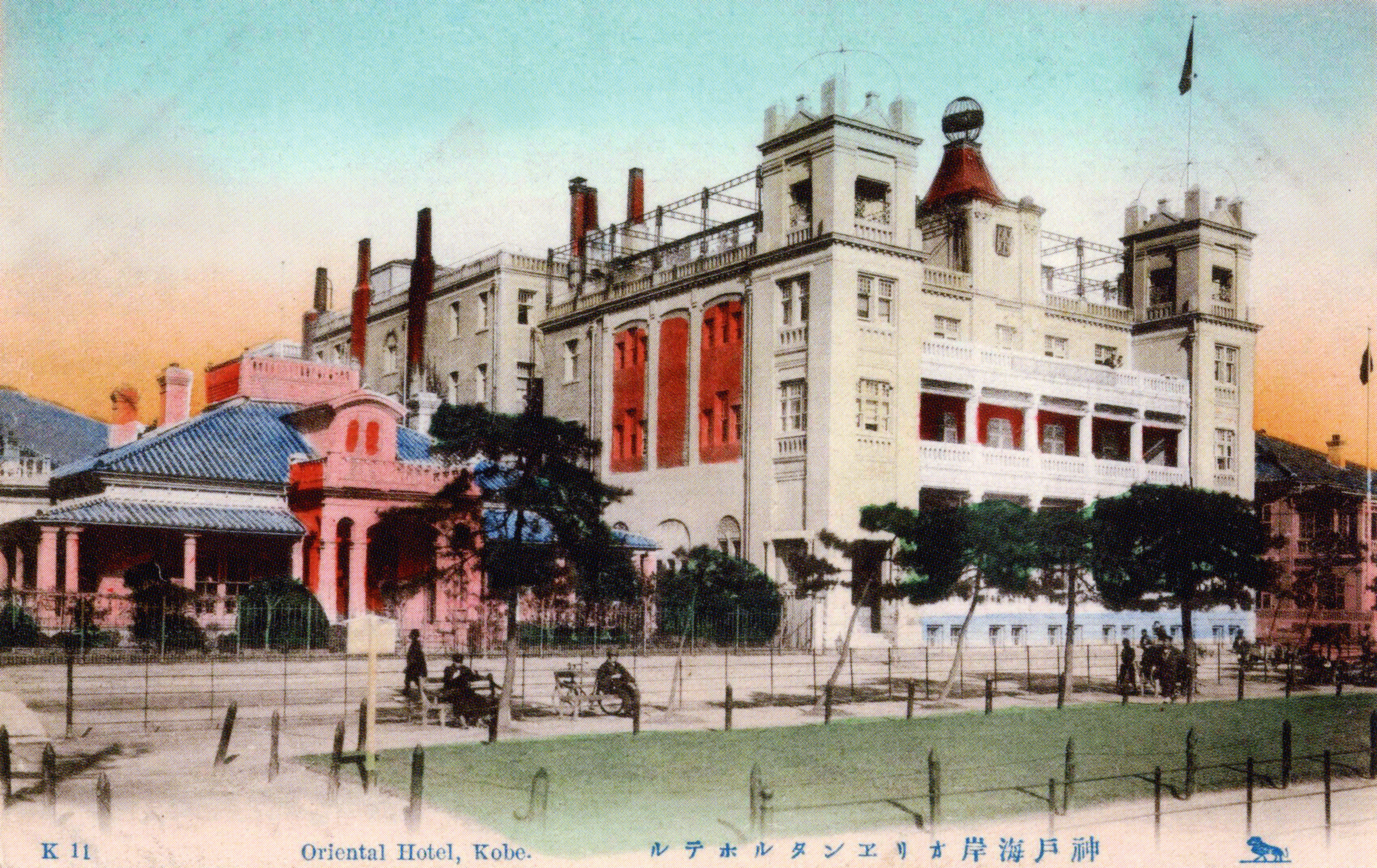
The Oriental Hotel on the Lot 6 of the former Foreign Settlement in Kobe (1907)

The first advertisement for the Oriental Hotel on the Lot 79 of the Settlement by Van der Vlies & Co. appeared in the Hiogo News, a local English-language newspaper for foreign settlers, on August 3, 1870. The proprietor of the hotel was a former Dutch naval physician Gerardus van der Vlies, who listed it only in the Japan Directory of 1879.

Van der Vlies had transferred to Nagasaki to serve as the proprietor of the Belle Vue Hotel between May 1879 and 1881. In 1880, the Club Concordia, a social club for foreign settlers, was relocated into the hotel. A French chef Louis Begeux served as the proprietor of the Oriental Hotel around 1882, when he opened another hotel with the same name on the Lot 121. By 1884, van der Vlies, again, had served as the proprietor of the hotel in Nagasaki until he died of cancer in November 1885.

Begeux ran Le Restaurant française on the Lot 122 around 1886, which gained a good reputation for French and western cuisine in short time. In 1887, the Lot 80 was acquired for the Oriental Hotel's expansion, where the Main Hall with 18 rooms and a grand dining hall was built. The hotel was listed once again in the Japan Directory of 1888. Its business went well due to Beguex's culinary delights on its food service until his return home to France in 1890.

Other foreign settlers in Kobe chipped in money, and succeeded the management of the Oriental Hotel. However, the business went down due to the hotel's mediocre food service. Then, L. Beguex, the son of Louis Begeux, was called back, and was hired as a manager. The hotel regained its reputation for its delighted cuisine and the business eventually recovered. In 1893, the Lot 87 was purchased for the Annex with 3 floors and a basement floor, which accommodated 36 rooms and a billiard room.

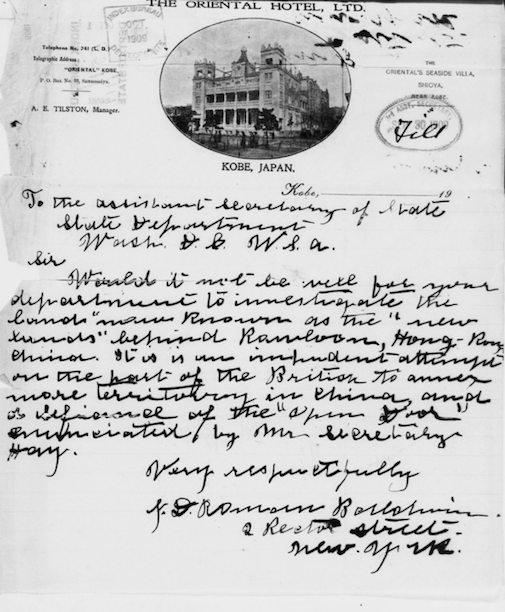
Note paper of the Oriental Hotel in 1909

Eventually, the Oriental Hotel was acquired by two British settlers, Arthur Hasketh Groom and Edward Hazlett Hunter, and other foreign settlers in 1897. The hotel was made into a limited company: the Oriental･Hotel, Ltd. C. N. Cross served the first president of the company, and Groom served the president sometime until 1916.

The original hotel was destroyed in WWII. A replacement building opened in 1948. It was damaged in the 1995 Hanshin earthquake and demolished.

=== Modern hotel ===
The current hotel opened in March 2010. In 2024, the hotel announced that it had lost the rights to use the name Oriental, and it was renamed The Orient on February 1, 2026.

== Restaurants ==
The Oriental Hotel has 4 food and beverage outlets.

- MAIN DINING by THE HOUSE OF PACIFIC, 17th Floor – Main restaurant
- Sushi KANBE, 17th Floor – produced by Sushi Azabu
- Steak House Medium Rare, 17th Floor – grilled dishes
- The Bar J. W. Hart, 17th Floor – Bar

== See also ==
- Rokkosan Oriental Hotel
- Oriental Hotel Maiko Villa
- Shinkobe Oriental Hotel
- Seishin Oriental Hotel
- Shin-Urayasu Oriental Hotel
- Kobe Meriken Park Oriental Hotel
- Namba Oriental Hotel
