= Mšené-lázně =

- Municipality
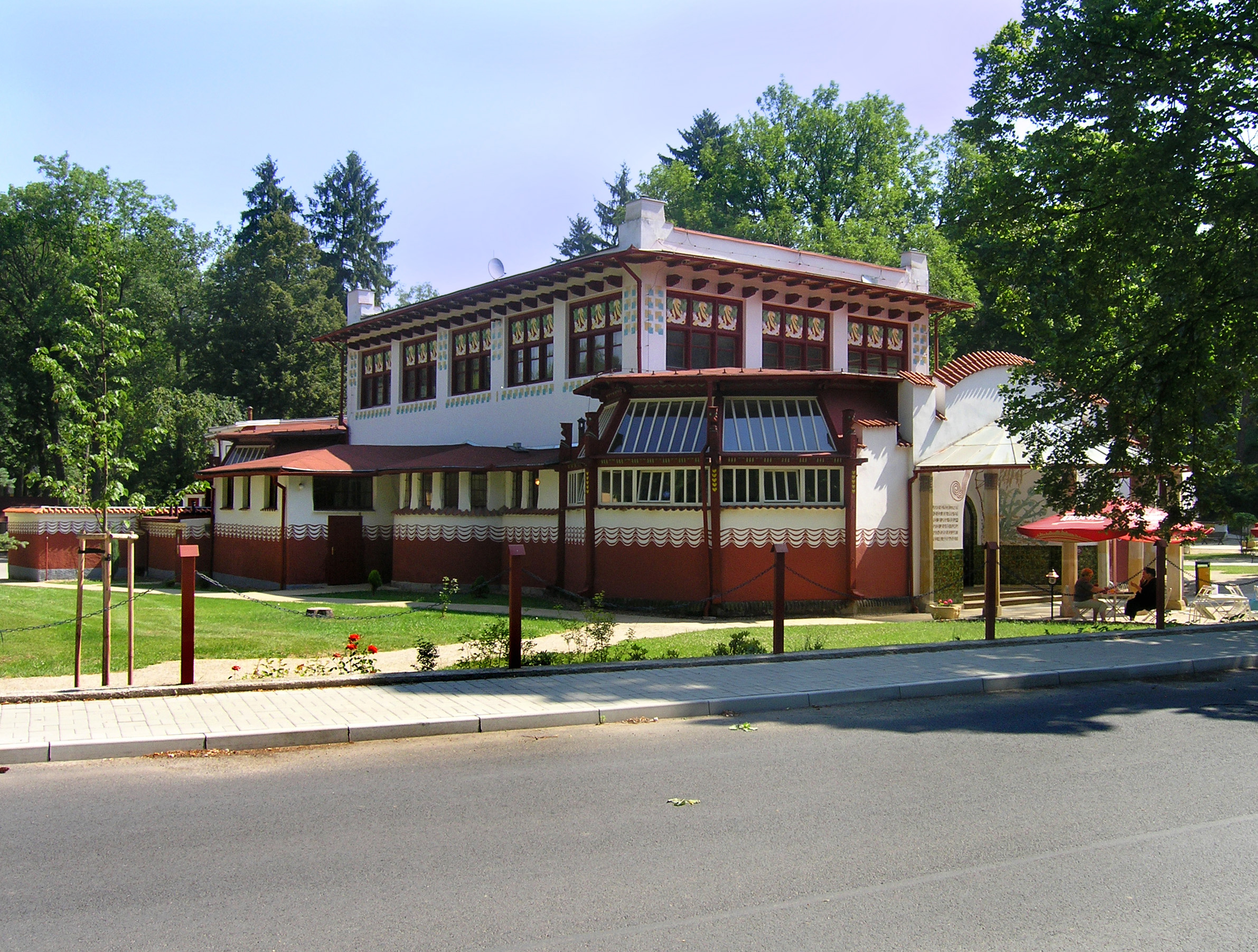
- Main building of Mšené spa

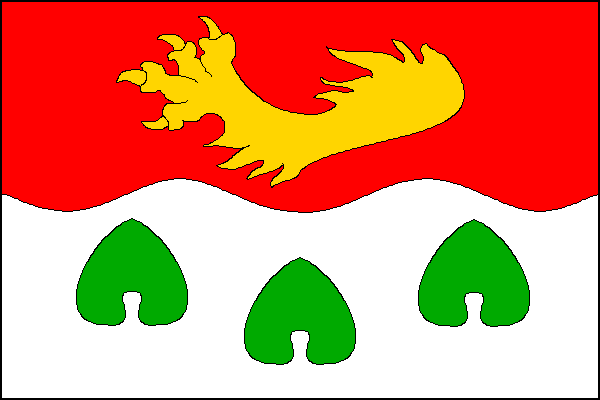
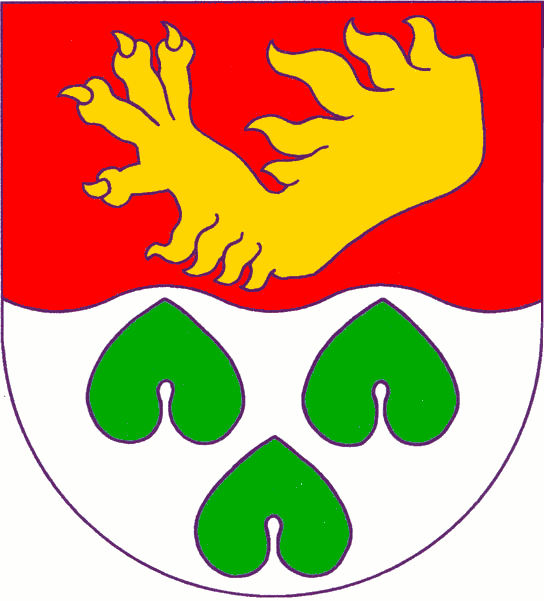
- Flag Coat of arms

- Location in the Czech Republic
- Coordinates: 50°21′44″N 14°7′38″E
- Country: Czech Republic
- Region: Ústí nad Labem
- District: Litoměřice
- First mentioned: 1262

Area
  - Total: 37.27 km^{2} (14.39 sq mi)
- Elevation: 213 m (699 ft)

Population (2026-01-01)
  - Total: 1,875
  - Density: 50.31/km^{2} (130.3/sq mi)
- Time zone: UTC+1 (CET)
  - Summer (DST): UTC+2 (CEST)
- Postal codes: 411 19, 411 20
- Website: www.msene-lazne.cz

Mšené-lázně is a spa municipality and village in Litoměřice District in the Ústí nad Labem Region of the Czech Republic. It has about 1,900 inhabitants.

== Administrative division ==
Mšené-lázně consists of six municipal parts (in brackets population according to the 2021 census):

- Mšené-lázně (890)
- Brníkov (209)
- Ječovice (93)
- Podbradec (119)
- Ředhošť (254)
- Vrbice (217)

== Etymology ==
The name Mšené is derived from the Czech word mech (i.e. 'moss') and the adjective mešný ('covered with moss'). Between 1950 and 1961, the municipality and village were renamed Mšené-lázně ('Mšené-spa').

== Geography ==
Mšené-lázně is located about 19 kilometres (12 mi) south of Litoměřice and 35 km (22 mi) northwest of Prague. It lies in a flat and mainly agricultural landscape in the Lower Ohře Table. The highest point is at 294 m (965 ft) above sea level. The stream Mšenský potok flows through the municipality.

== History ==
The first written mention of Mšené is from 1262. Until 1362, it was owned by a local noble family that called themselves the Lords of Mšené. In 1430–1451, Mšené was property of the Zajíc of Hazmburk family. Between 1453 and 1538, it was ruled by the Counts of Ileburg. From 1553 to 1638, it was again owned by the Zajícs of Hazmburk. From 1745, Mšené belonged to the Kinsky family, who had founded here the spa.

== Demographics ==
Historical population

| Year | Pop. | ±% |
|---|---|---|
| 1869 | 2,609 | — |
| 1880 | 3,021 | +15.8% |
| 1890 | 3,139 | +3.9% |
| 1900 | 3,313 | +5.5% |
| 1910 | 3,397 | +2.5% |

| Year | Pop. | ±% |
|---|---|---|
| 1921 | 3,445 | +1.4% |
| 1930 | 3,098 | −10.1% |
| 1950 | 2,336 | −24.6% |
| 1961 | 2,119 | −9.3% |
| 1970 | 1,891 | −10.8% |

| Year | Pop. | ±% |
|---|---|---|
| 1980 | 1,677 | −11.3% |
| 1991 | 1,576 | −6.0% |
| 2001 | 1,584 | +0.5% |
| 2011 | 1,718 | +8.5% |
| 2021 | 1,782 | +3.7% |

Source: Censuses

== Spa ==
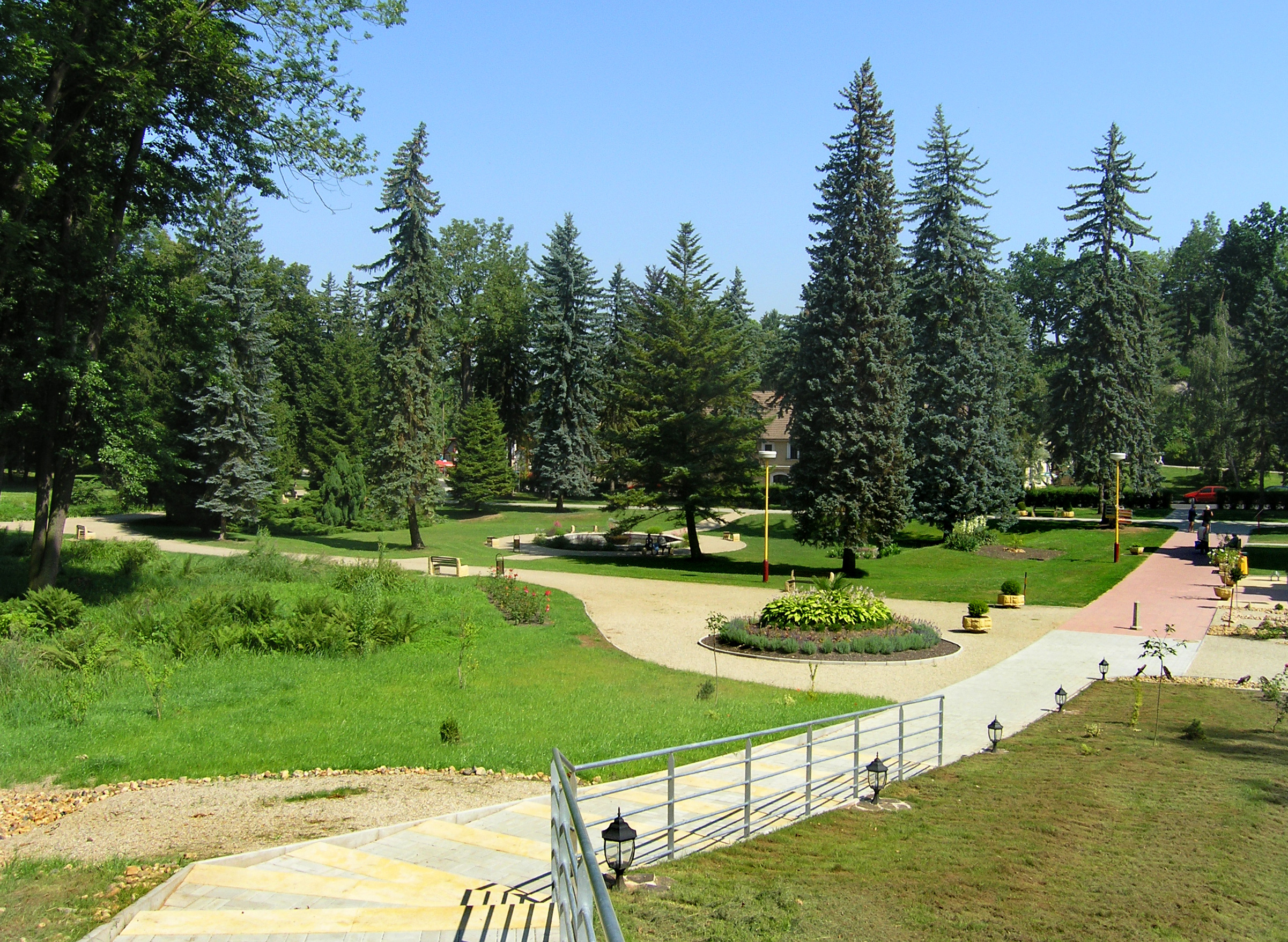
Spa park

Mšené Spa was founded in 1796. The local water is rich in iron and other minerals. The spa treat especially disorders of muscular system and nerves.

== Transport ==
Mšené-lázně is located on the railway line from Roudnice nad Labem to Libochovice. Historic trains run on it and it is only in operation during the summer tourist season on weekends.

== Sights ==
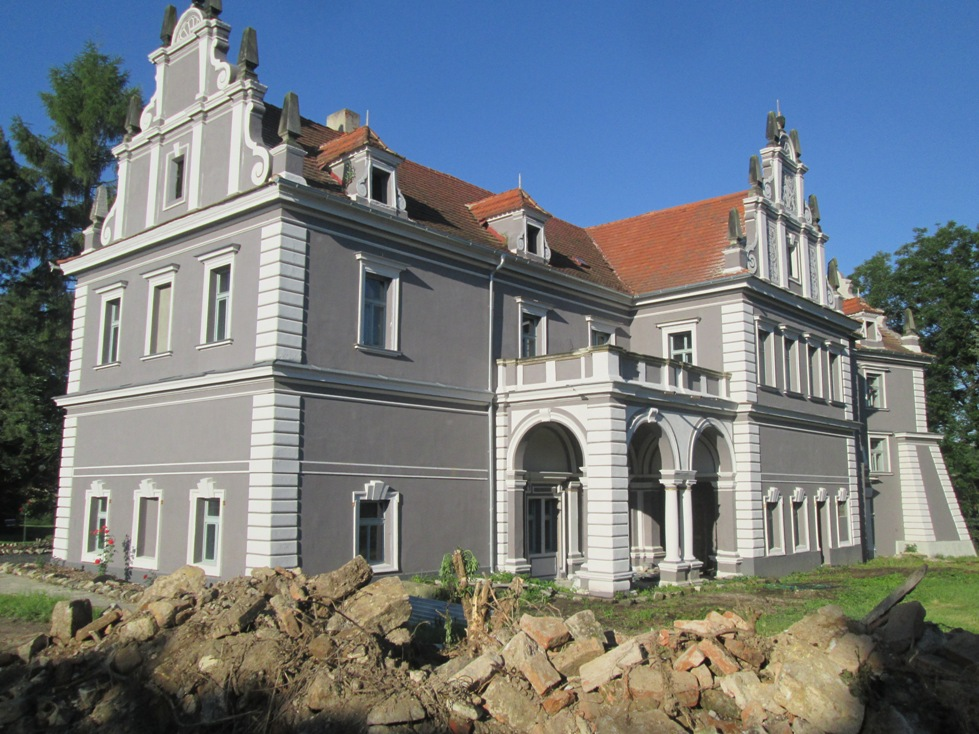
Mšené Castle

Among the main landmarks of Mšené-lázně are Mšené Castle, Chapel of the Saint John of Nepomuk and the town hall.

A fortress, probably built around 1400, was rebuilt into the early Baroque castle in 1660. It was modified in 1748 and then rebuilt in the Neo-Renaissance style at the end of the 19th century. Today it is privately owned and inaccessible.

The set of spa buildings from 1796 is protected as a cultural monument. At the beginning of the 20th century, they were rebuilt in their present form. They combine different architectural styles: late Baroque, Neoclassicism, Art Nouveau, folk art and modern architecture.

The Church of Saint Barbara is located in Ječovice. It was originally a Gothic church, probably from the 14th century. In 1783, it was rebuilt in the late Baroque style.

The Church of Saint Giles is located in Ředhošť. It was built in the Romanesque style, probably in the 12th century, and extended in the 14th century. Its present appearance is the result of Baroque modifications from the second half of the 18th century, but the Romanesque tower has been preserved.

== Notable people ==
- František Bayer (1854–1936), zoologist and paleontologist
- Antonín Hudeček (1872–1941), landscape painter
