= List of highways numbered 31 =

The following highways are numbered 31:

== International ==
- AH31 Asian Highway 31
- E31 European route E31

== Australia ==
- Hume Highway
  - Hume Motorway
  - Hume Freeway
- – South Australia
  - Gorge Road
  - Little Para Road
  - South Para Road
  - Lyndoch Valley Road

== Austria ==
- Burgenland Schnellstraße
- Ybbstal Straße

== Burma ==
- National Highway 31 (Burma)

== Canada ==
- Alberta Highway 31
- British Columbia Highway 31
- Manitoba Highway 31
- Ontario Highway 31 (former, now Ottawa Road 31)
- Quebec Autoroute 31
- Saskatchewan Highway 31

== Cuba ==
- Highway 3–31

== Czech Republic ==
- part of I/31 Highway; Czech: Silnice I/31

== France ==
- A31 autoroute

== Germany ==
- Bundesautobahn 31
- Bundesstraße 31

== Greece ==
- EO31 road

== Iceland ==
- Route 31 (Iceland)

== India ==
- NH 31

== Iran ==
- Road 31

== Ireland ==
- N31 road (Ireland)

== Israel ==
- Highway 31 (Israel)

== Italy ==
- Autostrada A31 (Italy)

== Japan ==
- Japan National Route 31
- Hiroshima-Kure Road

== Korea, South ==
- National Route 31

== Malaysia ==
- Damansara–Shah Alam Elevated Expressway
- FT 31 Malaysia Federal Route 31

== Netherlands ==
- A31 motorway (Netherlands)

== New Zealand ==
- New Zealand State Highway 31

== South Africa ==
- M31 road (Johannesburg)

== Sri Lanka ==
- A31 A31 highway (Sri Lanka)

== Thailand ==
- Vibhavadi Rangsit Road, also known as Superhighway Road or Thailand Route 31

== Turkey ==
- O-31, a motorway in Turkey running from İzmir to Aydın.

== United Kingdom ==
- British A31 (Bere Regis-Guilford)
- A31 road (Isle of Man)

== United States ==
- Interstate 31 (former)
- U.S. Route 31
  - U.S. Route 31W
  - U.S. Route 31E
- Arkansas Highway 31
- California State Route 31 (former)
  - County Route J31 (California)
  - County Route S31 (California)
- Connecticut Route 31
- Florida State Road 31
- Georgia State Route 31
- Hawaii Route 31
- Idaho State Highway 31
- Illinois Route 31
- Iowa Highway 31
- K-31 (Kansas highway)
- Louisiana Highway 31
- Maryland Route 31
- Massachusetts Route 31
- M-31 (Michigan highway) (former)
- Minnesota State Highway 31
  - County Road 31 (Anoka County, Minnesota)
  - County Road 31 (Dakota County, Minnesota)
  - County Road 31 (Hennepin County, Minnesota)
  - County Road 31 (Ramsey County, Minnesota)
- Missouri Route 31
- Nebraska Highway 31
- Nevada State Route 31 (former)
- New Hampshire Route 31
- New Jersey Route 31
  - County Route 31 (Bergen County, New Jersey)
    - County Route S31 (Bergen County, New Jersey)
  - County Route 31 (Monmouth County, New Jersey)
  - County Route 31 (Ocean County, New Jersey)
- New Mexico State Road 31
- New York State Route 31
  - New York State Route 31F
  - County Route 31 (Dutchess County, New York)
  - County Route 31 (Franklin County, New York)
  - County Route 31 (Greene County, New York)
  - County Route 31 (Livingston County, New York)
  - County Route 31 (Montgomery County, New York)
  - County Route 31 (Niagara County, New York)
  - County Route 31 (Orleans County, New York)
  - County Route 31 (Otsego County, New York)
  - County Route 31 (Suffolk County, New York)
  - County Route 31 (Ulster County, New York)
  - County Route 31 (Wyoming County, New York)
- North Carolina Highway 31 (former)
- North Dakota Highway 31
- Ohio State Route 31
- Oklahoma State Highway 31
- Oregon Route 31
- Pennsylvania Route 31
- South Carolina Highway 31
- Tennessee State Route 31
- Texas State Highway 31
  - Texas State Highway Spur 31
  - Farm to Market Road 31
  - Texas Park Road 31
- Utah State Route 31
- Vermont Route 31
- Virginia State Route 31
  - Virginia State Route 31 (1923-1933) (former)
- Washington State Route 31
- West Virginia Route 31
- Wisconsin Highway 31
- Wyoming Highway 31

Territories

- Puerto Rico Highway 31

== See also ==
- A31 (disambiguation)#Roads
- List of highways numbered 31A
- List of highways numbered 31B
- List of highways numbered 31C
- List of highways numbered 31D
- List of highways numbered 31E

| Preceded by 30 | Lists of highways 31 | Succeeded by 32 |
