= Kurahashi =

Kurahashi may refer to:

== Places ==
- Kurahashi-jima, an island of Hiroshima Prefecture, Japan
- Kurahashi, Hiroshima, a former town in Aki District, Hiroshima Prefecture, Japan

== Other uses ==
- Kurahashi (surname), a Japanese surname
- Kurahashi Station, a railway station in Asahi, Chiba Prefecture, Japan
