= Hiroshima-Kure Road =

Road in Japan

Hiroshima-Kure Road
- 国道%route%号
- 広島呉道路

Route information
- Maintained by West Nippon Expressway Company
- Length: 15.9 km (9.9 mi)
- Existed: 1974–present
- Component highways: National Route 31

Major junctions
- From: Niho Junction; Hiroshima Expressway Route 2 Hiroshima Expressway Route 3 in Minami-ku, Hiroshima
- To: Kure Interchange; National Route 31; National Route 185 in Kure, Hiroshima

Location
- Country: Japan

Highway system
- National highways of Japan; Expressways of Japan

Hiroshima-Kure Road (広島呉道路, Hiroshima-Kure Dōro) is a toll road in Hiroshima Prefecture. It is owned and operated by the West Nippon Expressway Company (NEXCO West Japan). The route is signed E31 under Ministry of Land, Infrastructure, Transport and Tourism's "2016 Proposal for Realization of Expressway Numbering."

== Junction list ==
The entire expressway is in Hiroshima Prefecture. PA - parking area, TB - toll gate

Location	km	mi	Exit	Name	Destinations	Notes
Minami-ku, Hiroshima	0	0.0	1	Niho	Hiroshima Prefecture Route 86	Closed due to use of the Niho Interchange on Hiroshima Expressway Route 2
Minami-ku, Hiroshima			1-1	Niho	Hiroshima Expressway Route 2– Fuchū, Sanyō Expressway; Hiroshima Expressway Route 3– Nishi-ku, Hiroshima, Hatsukaichi	Access only to and from Hiroshima Expressway
Hiroshima Bridge over the Hiroshima Bay
Saka			TB/PA	Saka		Northbound access only to the parking area
Saka	3.4	2.1	2-1	Saka-kita	National Route 31	Northbound entrance, southbound exit
Saka	3.9	2.4	2-2	Saka-minami	National Route 31	Northbound exit, southbound entrance
Kure	9.5	5.9	3-1	Tennō-nishi	National Route 31; Hiroshima Prefecture Route 66	Northbound entrance, southbound exit
Kure	10.1	6.3	3-2/TB	Tennō-higashi	National Route 31; Hiroshima Prefecture Route 66	Northbound exit, southbound entrance
Kure	15.9	9.9	4	Kure	National Route 31– Hiroshima, Central Kure; National Route 185– Mihara, Ondo	
1.000 mi = 1.609 km; 1.000 km = 0.621 mi: Closed/former; Incomplete access; Tolled

== See also ==
- Japan National Route 31
