= Ondo-no-seto =

Strait in Seto Inland Sea in Kure, Hiroshima

Coordinates: 34°11′40″N 132°32′15″E

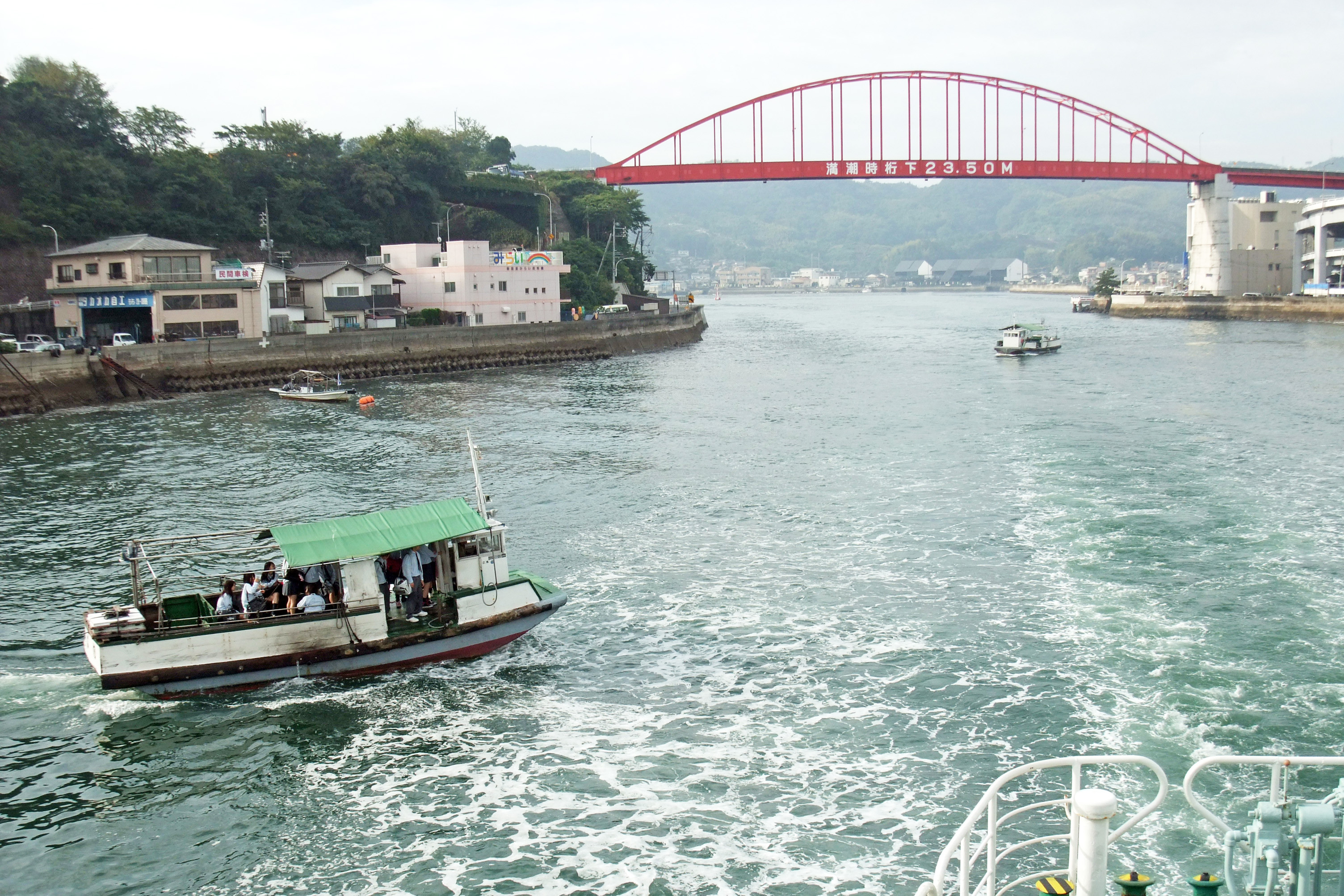
Ondo-ō-hashi and the strait

Ondo-no-seto (音戸の瀬戸) is a strait in Seto Inland Sea in Kure, Hiroshima between the main island of Japan and Kurahashi Island.

== Overview ==
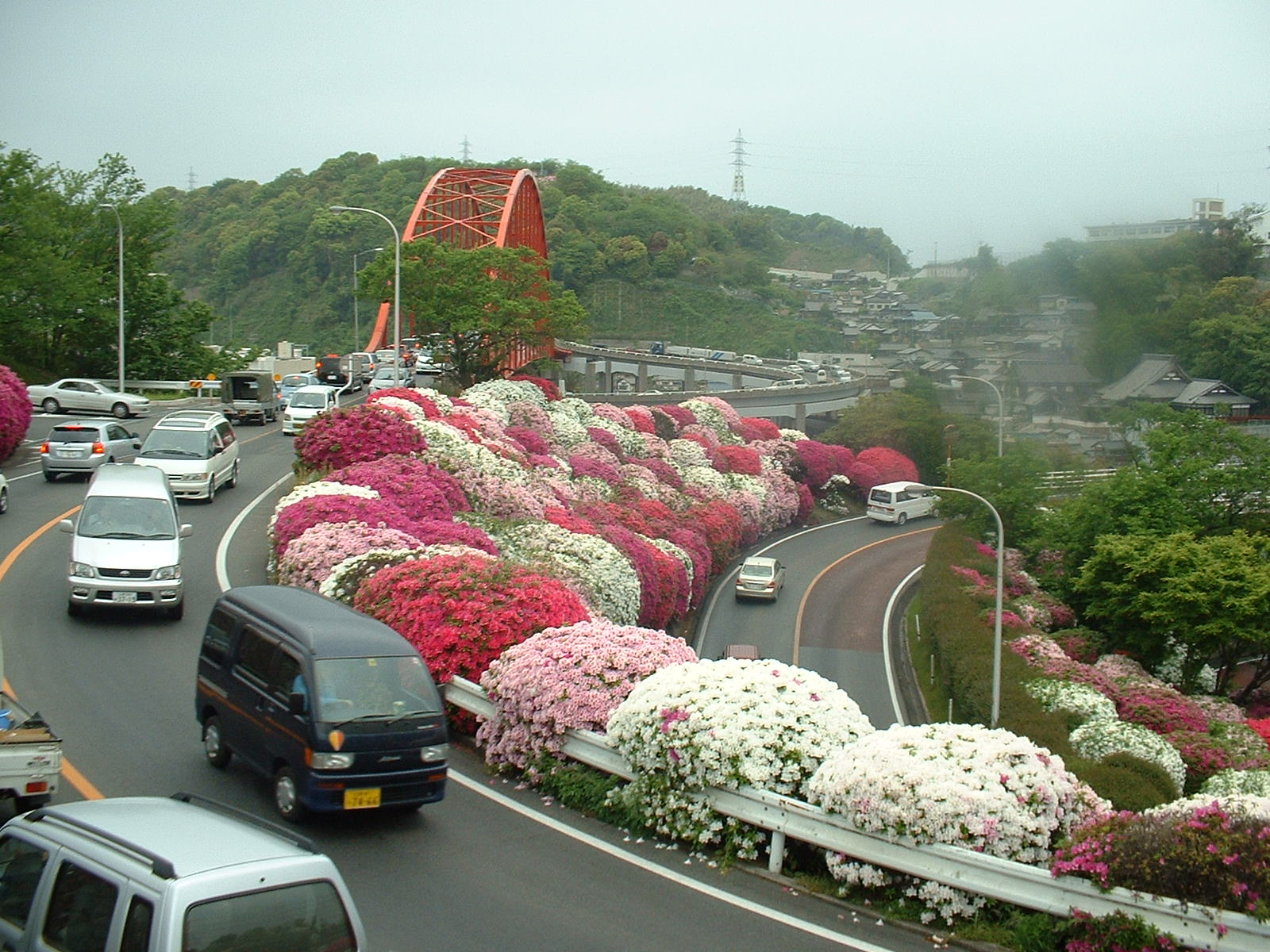
Ondo-ō-hashi

In the legend, Ondo-no-seto was excavated under the leadership of Taira no Kiyomori from 1164 to 1167 during the Heian period, to allow passage of trading ships for trade with China. But academic research shows that this legend is not the historical fact. Both old documents research and geological research proved that this strait was not an artificial product.

The famous red bridge, called "Ondo-ō-hashi,” crosses the Ondo-no-seto, and it is known for the azaleas growing there.

Around Ondo-no-seto on the main island side, Ondo-no-seto Park is a popular place to visit.

Ondo-no-seto is a part of Setonaikai National Park.

== See also ==
- Taira no Kiyomori
- Setonaikai National Park
