= Chugoku Communication Network =

Radio station in Hiroshima, Japan

Hiroshima P-station (JOZZ8AG-FM)

Naka-ku, Hiroshima; Japan
- Broadcast area: Hiroshima; Hatsukaichi; Kaita; Fuchū; Saka; Etajima
- Frequency: 76.6 MHz

Programming
- Format: News/Talk/Music

History
- First air date: May 1, 2000
- Call sign meaning: Chugoku Communication Network

Technical information
- ERP: 20 watts

Links
- Website: http://www.fmpst.co.jp/

Chugoku Communication Network (Hiroshima P-station) is a Japanese local FM radio station in Naka-ku, Hiroshima.

The station was found on May 20, 1987 and aired on May 1, 2000.
