= Toyohama, Hiroshima =

Dissolved municipality in Hiroshima prefecture, Japan

Toyohama (豊浜町, Toyohama-chō) was a town located in Toyota District, Hiroshima Prefecture, Japan.

As of 2003, the town had an estimated population of 2,065 and a density of 177.25 persons per km^{2}. The total area was 11.65 km^{2}.

On March 20, 2005, Toyohama, along with the towns of Ondo, Kurahashi and Kamagari (all from Aki District), and the towns of Yasuura and Yutaka (all from Toyota District), was merged into the expanded city of Kure and no longer exists as an independent municipality.
