= Station P (disambiguation) =

Station P may refer to:

- Station P, an encampment in Antarctica
- Station P (ocean measurement site)
- Chugoku Communication Network, also known as Hiroshima Station P
