= Yasuura, Hiroshima =

Coordinates: 34°16′56.0″N 132°44′25.2″E

- Town
- Interactive map of Yasuura, Hiroshima
- Country: Japan
- District: Toyota District
- Prefecture: Hiroshima Prefecture

Yasuura (安浦町, Yasuura-chō) was a town located in Toyota District, Hiroshima Prefecture, Japan.

As of 2003, the town had an estimated population of 12,596 and a density of 198.27 persons per km^{2}. The total area was 63.53 km^{2}.

On March 20, 2005, Yasuura, along with the towns of Ondo, Kurahashi and Kamagari (all from Aki District), and the towns of Toyohama and Yutaka (all from Toyota District), was merged into the expanded city of Kure and no longer exists as an independent municipality.
