= Yutaka, Hiroshima =

Dissolved municipality in Hiroshima prefecture, Japan

Yutaka (豊町, Yutaka-machi) was a town located in Toyota District, Hiroshima Prefecture, Japan. The town covered the majority of the island of Ōsakishimojima and outlying small islands of the Seto Inland Sea.

As of 2003, the town had an estimated population of 2,706 and a density of 192.19 persons per km^{2}. The total area was 14.08 km^{2}.

On March 20, 2005, Yutaka, along with the towns of Ondo, Kurahashi and Kamagari (all from Aki District), and the towns of Yasuura and Toyohama (all from Toyota District), was merged into the expanded city of Kure and no longer exists as an independent municipality.
