= Kamagari, Hiroshima =

Dissolved municipality in Hiroshima prefecture, Japan

Kamagari (蒲刈町, Kamagari-chō) was a town located in Aki District, Hiroshima Prefecture, Japan.

== History ==
As of 2003, the town had an estimated population of 2,532 and a density of 133.97 persons per km^{2}. The total area was 18.90 km^{2}.

On March 20, 2005, Kamagari, along with the towns of Ondo and Kurahashi (all from Aki District), and the towns of Yasuura, Toyohama and Yutaka (all from Toyota District), was merged into the expanded city of Kure and no longer exists as an independent municipality.

== Geography ==
The town of Kamagari is the main settlement of the Kamagari Islands in the Seto Inland Sea.

=== Climate ===
Climate data for Kamagari (2009−2020 normals, extremes 2009−present)
Month	Jan	Feb	Mar	Apr	May	Jun	Jul	Aug	Sep	Oct	Nov	Dec	Year
Record high °C (°F)	16.3 (61.3)	19.6 (67.3)	20.8 (69.4)	27.4 (81.3)	29.2 (84.6)	31.5 (88.7)	34.5 (94.1)	36.2 (97.2)	35.6 (96.1)	31.8 (89.2)	24.1 (75.4)	21.2 (70.2)	36.2 (97.2)
Mean daily maximum °C (°F)	9.9 (49.8)	10.2 (50.4)	13.4 (56.1)	17.8 (64.0)	22.6 (72.7)	25.3 (77.5)	28.9 (84.0)	31.4 (88.5)	27.9 (82.2)	22.8 (73.0)	17.5 (63.5)	11.9 (53.4)	20.0 (67.9)
Daily mean °C (°F)	6.6 (43.9)	6.7 (44.1)	9.6 (49.3)	13.7 (56.7)	18.2 (64.8)	21.5 (70.7)	25.2 (77.4)	27.1 (80.8)	24.1 (75.4)	19.3 (66.7)	14.1 (57.4)	8.7 (47.7)	16.2 (61.2)
Mean daily minimum °C (°F)	3.4 (38.1)	3.4 (38.1)	6.0 (42.8)	10.1 (50.2)	14.5 (58.1)	18.6 (65.5)	22.4 (72.3)	24.1 (75.4)	21.3 (70.3)	16.3 (61.3)	11.0 (51.8)	5.6 (42.1)	13.1 (55.5)
Record low °C (°F)	−3.5 (25.7)	−2.7 (27.1)	−0.4 (31.3)	3.2 (37.8)	6.1 (43.0)	12.6 (54.7)	17.8 (64.0)	18.7 (65.7)	15.2 (59.4)	9.0 (48.2)	3.8 (38.8)	−0.6 (30.9)	−3.5 (25.7)
Average precipitation mm (inches)	48.5 (1.91)	65.7 (2.59)	109.3 (4.30)	118.8 (4.68)	116.2 (4.57)	230.0 (9.06)	265.8 (10.46)	115.8 (4.56)	161.3 (6.35)	131.2 (5.17)	80.1 (3.15)	68.8 (2.71)	1,524.4 (60.02)
Average precipitation days (≥ 1.0 mm)	4.6	7.3	8.4	8.3	7.2	10.9	9.3	7.2	8.3	7.4	6.7	6.6	92.2
Mean monthly sunshine hours	174.6	157.7	198.5	208.0	236.3	164.7	189.4	242.2	174.5	183.9	165.7	157.5	2,253.5
Source: Japan Meteorological Agency
