= Japan National Route 490 =

Road in Yamaguchi prefecture, Japan

National Route 490
- 国道490号
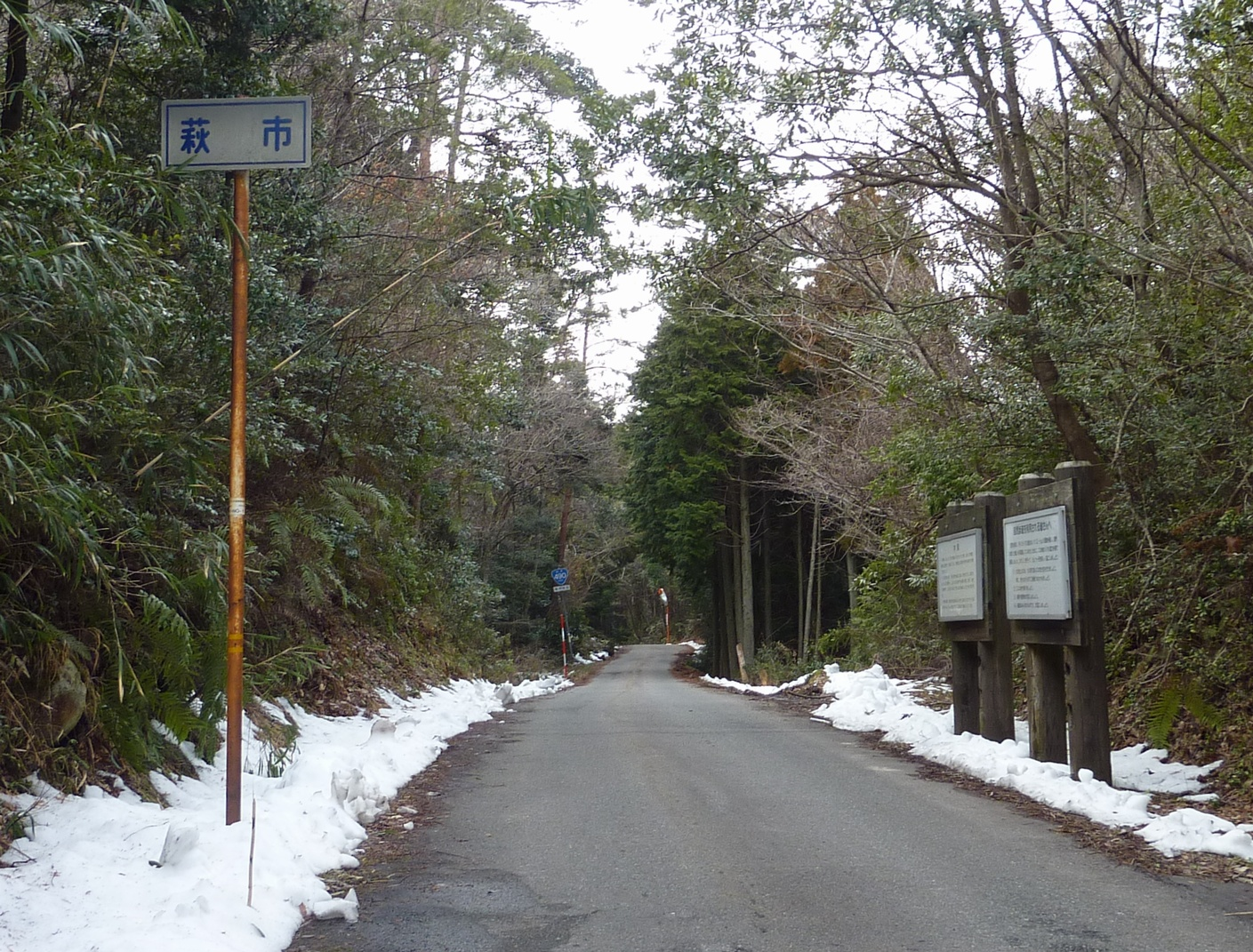

Route information
- Length: 62.4 km (38.8 mi)

Location
- Country: Japan

Highway system
- National highways of Japan; Expressways of Japan
← National Route 489	→ National Route 491

National Route 490 is a national highway of Japan connecting Ube, Yamaguchi and Hagi, Yamaguchi in Japan, with a total length of 62.4 km (38.8 mi).
