= Kure =

Kure 呉市
- Core city
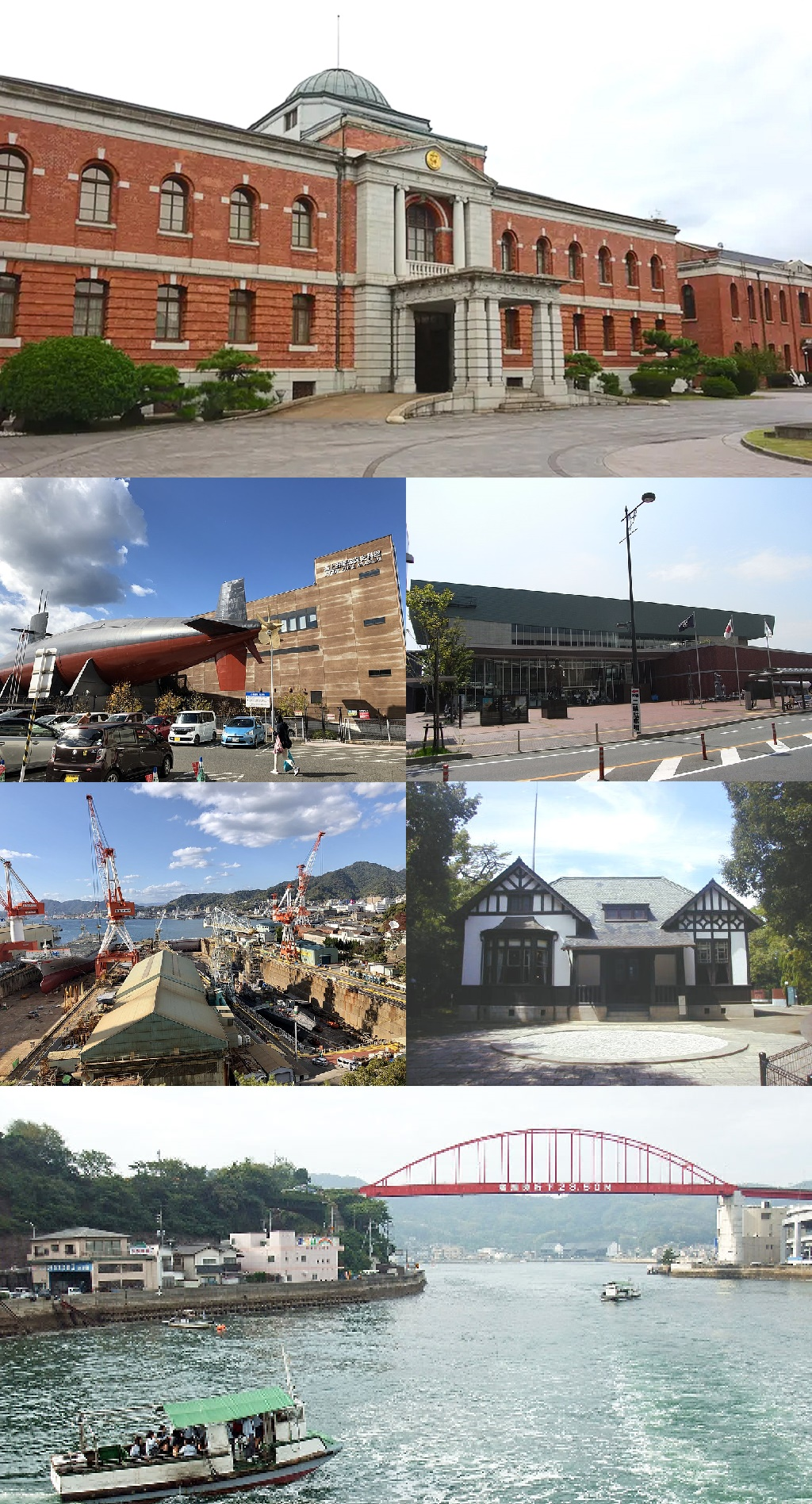
JMSDF Kure District HQ
JMSDF Kure Museum	Yamato Museum
JMU Kure shipyard	Irifuneyama Museum
Ondō Bridge & Ondo-no-seto
- Flag Seal
- Interactive map of Kure
- Location in Japan
- Coordinates: 34°14′57″N 132°33′57″E
- Country: Japan
- Region: Chūgoku (Sanyō)
- Prefecture: Hiroshima

Government
  - Mayor: Yoshiake Shinhara (from November, 2017)

Area
  - Total: 352.80 km^{2} (136.22 sq mi)

Population (April 30, 2023)
  - Total: 208,024
  - Density: 589.64/km^{2} (1,527.2/sq mi)
- Time zone: UTC+09:00 (JST)
- City hall address: 4-1-6 Chūō, Kure-shi, Hiroshima-ken 737-8501
- Climate: Cfa
- Website: Official website
- Symbols
- Flower: Camellia
- Tree: Oak

Kure (呉市, Kure-shi; Japanese pronunciation: [kɯ̈́.ɾè̞, kɯ̈̀.ɾé̞.ɕì], locally [kɯ̈̀.ɾé̞]) is a city in the Hiroshima Prefecture, Japan. As of 30 April 2023, the city had an estimated population of 208,024 in 106,616 households and a population density of 590 persons per km^{2}. The total area of the city is 352.80 square kilometres (136.22 sq mi). With a strong industrial and naval heritage, Kure hosts the second-oldest naval dockyard in Japan and remains an important base for the Japan Maritime Self-Defense Force.

== History ==
The area of Kure is part of ancient Aki Province, and the port of Kure was an important seaport for Hiroshima Domain in the Edo period.

The Kure Naval District was first established in 1889, leading to the construction of the Kure Naval Arsenal and the rapid growth of steel production and shipbuilding in the city. Kure was formally incorporated on October 1, 1902. From 1889 until the end of the Pacific War, the city served as the headquarters of the Kure Naval District.

Kure dockyards recorded a number of significant engineering firsts including the launching of the first major domestically built capital ship, the battlecruiser Tsukuba (1905) and the launching of the largest battleship ever built, the Yamato (1940).

During the Pacific War, Kure acted as the Imperial Japanese Navy's single-largest naval base and arsenal. Most of the city's industry and workforce were employed in the service of the naval installations, munitions factories and associated support functions. In the later stages of the conflict Kure came under sustained aerial bombardment culminating in the bombing of Kure in June and July 1945.

From February 1946 until the end of Japan's postwar occupation in 1952, military establishments in Kure served as the operational headquarters for the British Commonwealth Occupation Force.

Since 2005, Kure has attracted attention as a tourism center with the Yamato Museum hosting a 1:10 scale model of the Yamato alongside a waterfront JMSDF museum of Japanese naval history.

The city continues as a major maritime center hosting both the dockyards of Japan Marine United and numerous shore-based facilities of the JMSDF including training centers and a major hospital. The city serves as the home port of an Escort Flotilla (Destroyers), a Submarine Flotilla and the Training Squadron of the JMSDF Regional Kure District.

=== Historic timeline ===
- July 1, 1889 — Kure Naval District established.
- 1895 — Kure naval shipyard established, initially as a subsidiary of the Onohama Shipyards in Kobe.
- October 1, 1902 — The towns of Washō and Futagawa and the villages of Miyahara and Sōyamada merge to form the city of Kure.
- November 10, 1903 — Kure Naval Arsenal established.
- December 27, 1903 Kure rail line opens providing direct rail access to Hiroshima
- April 1, 1928 — The towns of Kegoya, Yoshiura, and Aga merge into Kure.
- April 21, 1941 — The town of Nigata and the village of Hiro incorporated into Kure.
- March 19, 1945 — US Navy aircraft attack Japanese warships at Kure
- May 5, 1945 — Bombing of Hiro Naval Arsenal.
- June 22, 1945 — Bombing of Kure Naval Arsenal.
- July 1, 1945 — Kure Air Raid.
- July 24–28, 1945 — Battle of Kure, American bombers attack the remaining fleet in Kure Naval Base.
- July 1, 1954 — Japan Maritime Self-Defense Force founded.
- October 1, 1956 — The town of Tennō and the village of Shōwa in Aki District, and the village of Gōhara in Kamo District merge into Kure.
- November 1, 2000 — Kure becomes a Special City
- April 1, 2003 — The town of Shimokamagari (from Aki District) was merged into Kure.
- April 1, 2004 —The town of Kawajiri (from Toyota District) was merged into Kure.
- March 20, 2005 — The towns of Ondo, Kurahashi and Kamagari (all from Aki District), and the towns of Yasuura, Toyohama and Yutaka (all from Toyota District) were merged into Kure.
- April 1, 2016 — Kure officially became a Core city with increased local autonomy

== Government ==
Kure has a mayor-council form of government with a directly elected mayor and a unicameral city council of 31 members. Kure contributes five members to the Hiroshima Prefectural Assembly. In terms of national politics, the city is part of the Hiroshima 5th district of the lower house of the Diet of Japan.

=== List of mayors of Kure (from 1903 to present) ===
#	Name	Term start	Term end	Japanese name
1	Giichiro Sakuma	4 February 1903	8 June 1903	佐久間義一郎
2-3	Kingo Arao	27 August 1903	28 August 1911	荒尾金吾
4-5	Toshio Sawahara	28 November 1911	6 July 1917	沢原俊雄
6	Kentaro Amano	17 August 1917	16 August 1921	天野健太郎
7	Kahei Shundo	2 February 1922	16 June 1925	春藤嘉平
8	Masaharu Hashimoto	24 April 1925	11 March 1927	橋本正治
9	Toichi Katsuta	13 June 1927	25 November 1930	勝田登一
10	Hideo Sasaki	25 November 1930	21 December 1932	佐々木英雄
11	Atsumu Watanabe	26 December 1932	12 May 1935	渡辺伍
12	Katsutaro Matsumoto	13 June 1935	1 September 1936	松本勝太郎
12-13, 15	Jinjiro Mizuno	4 May 1937; 14 January 1946	13 December 1941; 15 November 1946	水野甚次郎
14	Noboru Suzuki	11 June 1942	10 January 1946	鈴木登
17-18	Jyutsu Suzuki	5 April 1947	21 March 1954	鈴木術
19-20	Kenichi Matsumoto	18 April 1954	31 October 1961	松本賢一
21-24	Yoshito Okuhara	19 November 1961	18 November 1977	奥原義人
25-28	Ari Sasaki	19 November 1977	18 November 1993	佐々木有
29-31	Shinya Ogasawara	19 November 1993	18 November 2005	小笠原臣也
32-34	Kazutoshi Komura	19 November 2005	18 November 2017	小村和年
35	Yoshiake Shinhara	19 November 2017	Present	新原芳明

== Geography ==
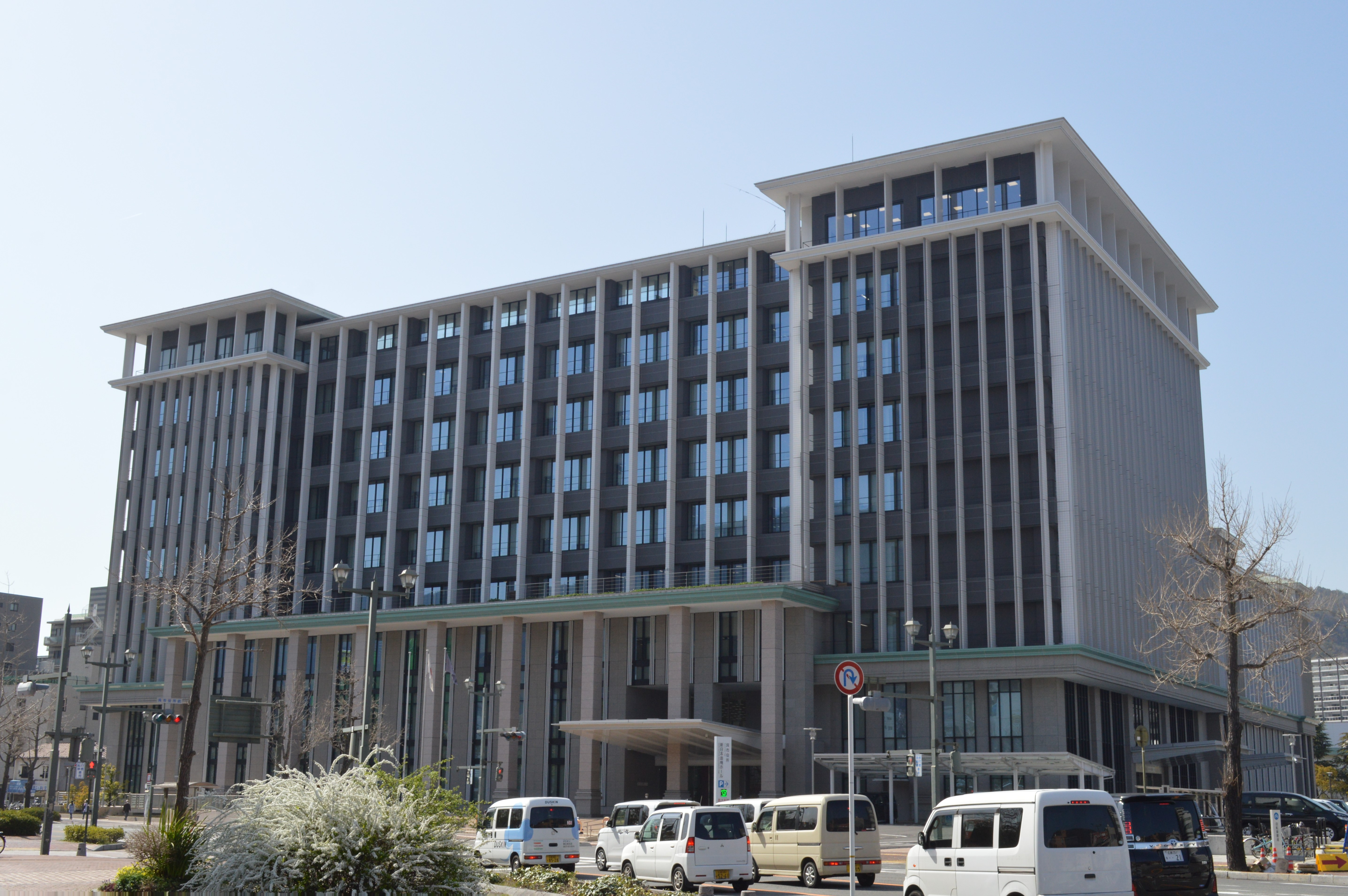
Kure City Hall

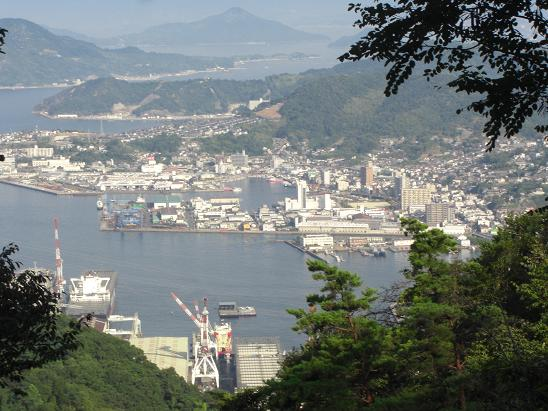
Port of Kure seen from Yasumi-yama

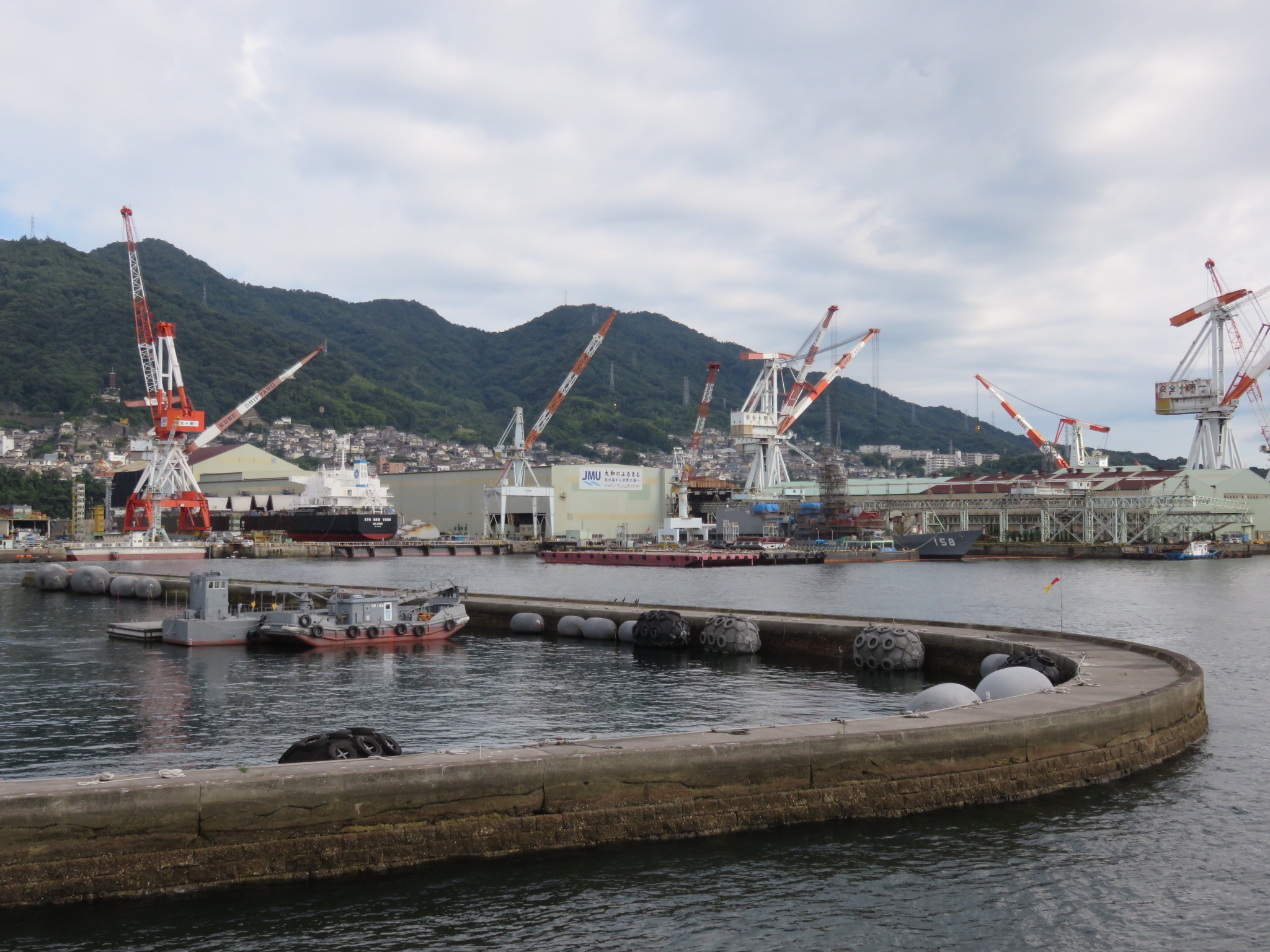
JMU Kure shipyard in July 2015

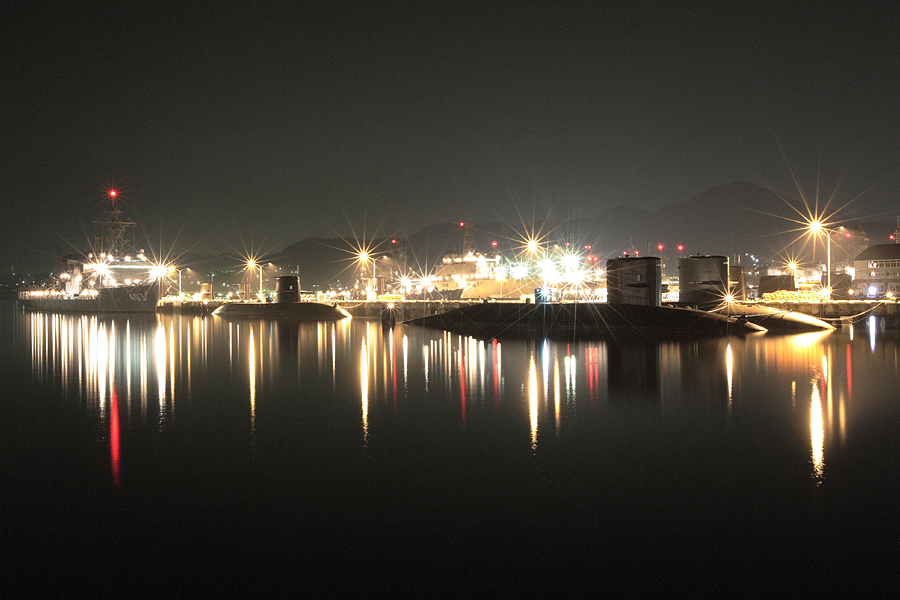
JMSDF submarine flotilla in Kure

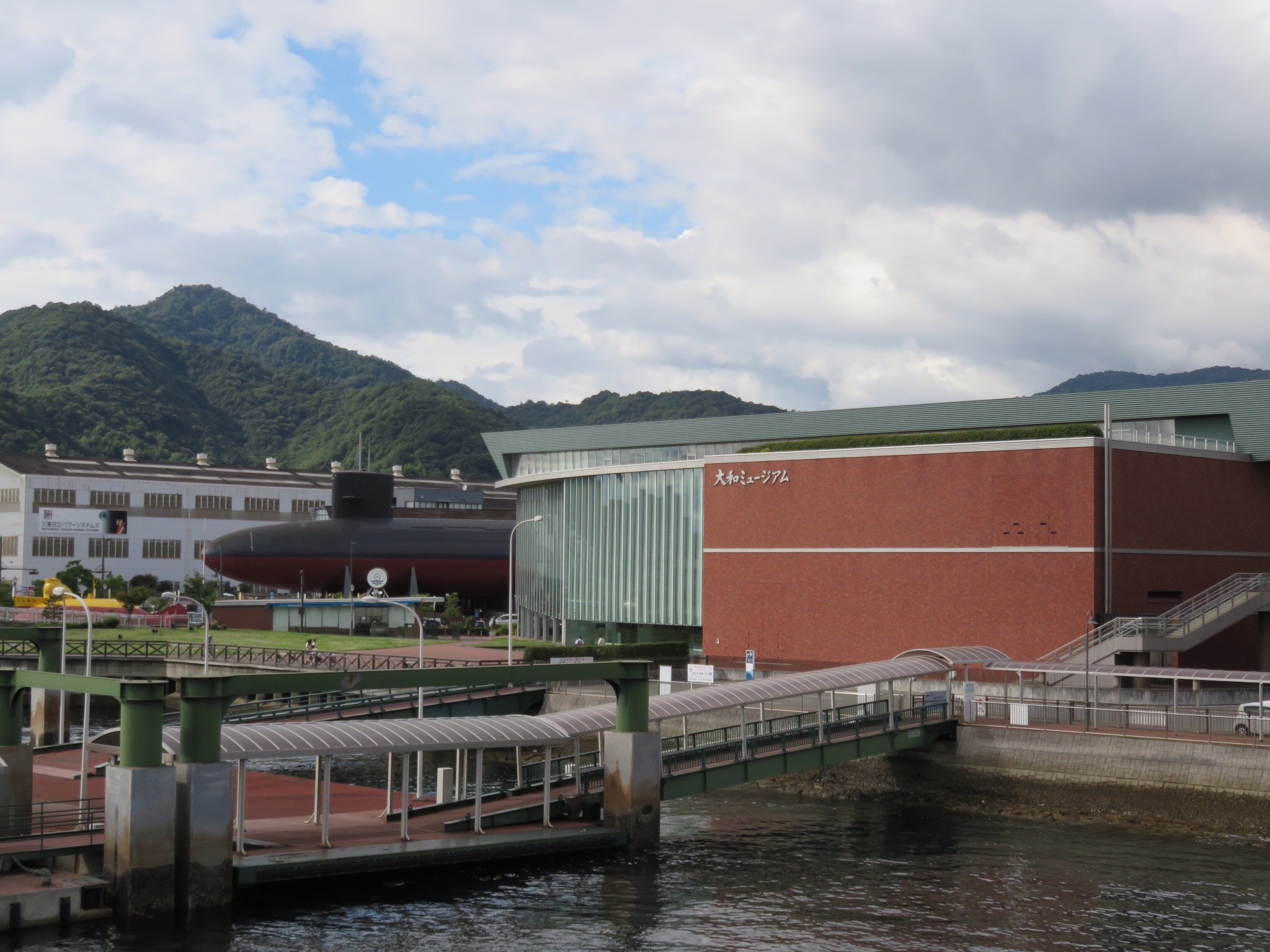
Exterior view of the Yamato Museum and adjacent JMSDF Kure Museum

Kure is located 20 kilometres (10 mi) south-east of Hiroshima city and faces the Seto Inland Sea. Surrounded by steep hillsides to the north, the two major commercial and industrial centers of the city are bisected by Mount Yasumi 497 m (1,631 ft). The city is next to the Setonaikai National Park. As well as densely populated urban and industrial centers, the city also incorporates sparsely inhabited outlying islands such as Kurahashi-jima, Shimo-kamagari, Kami-kamagari and Toyoshima.

=== Adjoining municipalities ===
Hiroshima Prefecture

- Etajima
- Higashihiroshima
- Kumano
- Minami-ku, Hiroshima
- Ōsakikamijima
- Saka

=== Climate ===
Kure has a humid subtropical climate (Köppen climate classification Cfa) with hot summers and cool winters. Precipitation is significant throughout the year and is heaviest in summer.

Climate data for Kure (1991−2020 normals, extremes 1894−present)
Month	Jan	Feb	Mar	Apr	May	Jun	Jul	Aug	Sep	Oct	Nov	Dec	Year
Record high °C (°F)	19.0 (66.2)	21.5 (70.7)	24.1 (75.4)	28.1 (82.6)	30.7 (87.3)	33.7 (92.7)	36.9 (98.4)	37.8 (100.0)	36.1 (97.0)	31.1 (88.0)	26.3 (79.3)	22.7 (72.9)	37.8 (100.0)
Mean maximum °C (°F)	14.1 (57.4)	16.1 (61.0)	19.7 (67.5)	24.2 (75.6)	27.7 (81.9)	30.0 (86.0)	33.5 (92.3)	34.4 (93.9)	32.1 (89.8)	27.7 (81.9)	22.2 (72.0)	17.1 (62.8)	34.6 (94.3)
Mean daily maximum °C (°F)	9.5 (49.1)	10.2 (50.4)	13.6 (56.5)	18.7 (65.7)	23.3 (73.9)	26.1 (79.0)	29.9 (85.8)	31.5 (88.7)	28.1 (82.6)	22.9 (73.2)	17.3 (63.1)	11.9 (53.4)	20.3 (68.5)
Daily mean °C (°F)	6.1 (43.0)	6.5 (43.7)	9.6 (49.3)	14.4 (57.9)	19.0 (66.2)	22.4 (72.3)	26.5 (79.7)	27.9 (82.2)	24.5 (76.1)	19.2 (66.6)	13.6 (56.5)	8.4 (47.1)	16.5 (61.7)
Mean daily minimum °C (°F)	2.8 (37.0)	3.0 (37.4)	5.7 (42.3)	10.4 (50.7)	15.2 (59.4)	19.4 (66.9)	23.8 (74.8)	25.0 (77.0)	21.5 (70.7)	15.8 (60.4)	10.0 (50.0)	5.0 (41.0)	13.1 (55.6)
Mean minimum °C (°F)	−1.3 (29.7)	−1.0 (30.2)	0.7 (33.3)	4.2 (39.6)	10.2 (50.4)	15.5 (59.9)	20.3 (68.5)	21.6 (70.9)	16.7 (62.1)	10.0 (50.0)	4.4 (39.9)	0.7 (33.3)	−1.9 (28.6)
Record low °C (°F)	−5.4 (22.3)	−7.1 (19.2)	−4.9 (23.2)	−0.5 (31.1)	4.7 (40.5)	10.1 (50.2)	14.8 (58.6)	16.4 (61.5)	9.7 (49.5)	4.4 (39.9)	0.0 (32.0)	−5.5 (22.1)	−7.1 (19.2)
Average precipitation mm (inches)	41.5 (1.63)	59.3 (2.33)	106.7 (4.20)	126.0 (4.96)	147.2 (5.80)	217.9 (8.58)	251.4 (9.90)	113.2 (4.46)	143.7 (5.66)	97.2 (3.83)	65.1 (2.56)	48.3 (1.90)	1,417.2 (55.80)
Average snowfall cm (inches)	1 (0.4)	2 (0.8)	trace	0 (0)	0 (0)	0 (0)	0 (0)	0 (0)	0 (0)	0 (0)	0 (0)	0 (0)	3 (1.2)
Average precipitation days (≥ 1.0 mm)	4.7	6.5	8.8	9.0	8.6	10.6	9.6	6.5	8.1	6.4	5.8	5.3	89.9
Average snowy days (≥ 1 cm)	0.3	0.7	0.1	0	0	0	0	0	0	0	0	0	1.1
Average relative humidity (%)	63	63	63	63	67	75	76	73	70	66	66	65	68
Mean monthly sunshine hours	140.7	145.7	181.7	194.8	212.3	155.9	183.9	217.9	166.8	176.0	150.5	141.6	2,067.9
Source: Japan Meteorological Agency

== Demographics ==
Per Japanese census data, the population of Kure has been declining for the past 40 years.

Historical population
Year	Pop.	±%
1940	355,297	—
1950	292,769	−17.6%
1960	291,887	−0.3%
1970	306,222	+4.9%
1980	302,766	−1.1%
1990	280,429	−7.4%
2000	259,224	−7.6%
2010	239,553	−7.6%
Kure population statistics

== Economy ==
- Disco Corporation has three manufacturing plants in Kure
- Japan Marine United, formerly IHI Marine United, has a shipyard in the city
- Mitsubishi Hitachi Power Systems
- Mitutoyo
- Nisshin Steel
- Oji Paper Company
- Sailor Pen Company
- Yodogawa Steel Works

== Education ==
=== Colleges and Universities ===
- Goko Academy
- Japan Coast Guard Academy
- Kure Kyosai Hospital Nursing College
- Kure University
- National Institute of Technology, Kure College

=== Primary and secondary education ===
Kure has 37 public elementary schools, 25 public junior high schools and one public high school operated by the city government, and seven public high school operated by the Hiroshima Prefectural Board of Education. There are also one private middle school and three price high schools. The prefecture also operates two special education schools for the disabled.

== Transportation ==
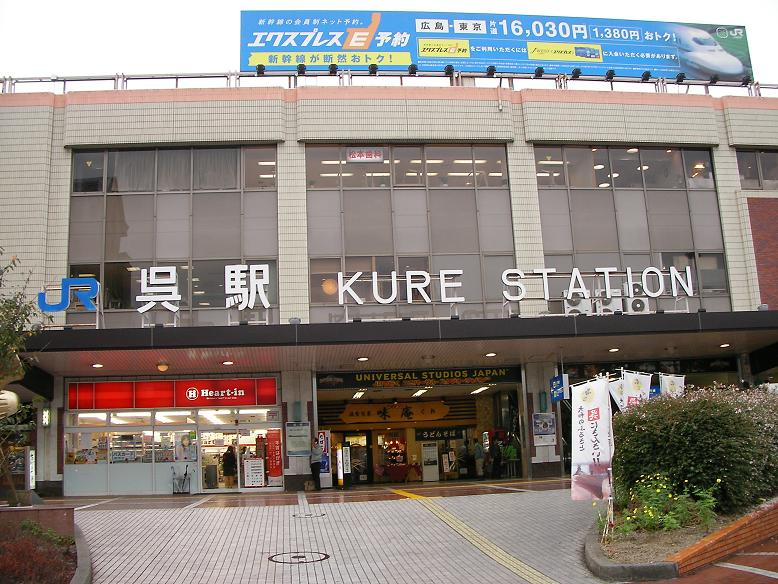
Kure station

=== Railway ===
JR West (JR West) - Kure Line

- Yasuura - Ato - Akikawajiri - Nigata - Hiro - Shin-Hiro - Akiaga - Kure - Kawaraishi - Yoshiura - Karugahama - Tennō - Kure-Portopia

=== Highways ===
- Higashihiroshima-Kure Expressway
- Hiroshima-Kure Road
- National Route 31
- National Route 185
- National Route 375
- National Route 487

== Sister cities ==
As of September 2017, Kure has sister city agreements with the following cities.

=== Sister cities ===
- Bremerton, Washington, United States (since August 1970)
- Marbella, Andalusia, Spain (since December 1990)
- Jinhae-gu, Changwon, South Gyeongsang, South Korea (since October 1999)
- Keelung, Taiwan (since April 2017)

=== Friendship cities ===
- Daisen, Tottori (since September 1995)

=== Friendship ports ===
- Wenzhou, Zhejiang, People's Republic of China (since May 2001)

== Local attractions ==
=== Museums ===
- Irifuneyama Memorial Museum
- JMSDF Kure Museum (Displaying Yūshio-class submarine Akishio), nicknamed Iron Whale Museum
- Kurahashi-cho Nagato Museum of Shipbuilding History
- Kure Municipal Museum of Art and Museum Avenue
- Rantokaku Art Museum
- Sannose Gohonjin Art and Culture
- Yamato Museum

=== Shrines ===
- Kameyama Shrine

=== Historical places ===
- Former Kure-chinjufu
- Former House of Prince Takamatsu
- House of Kimiyo Fujii
- Takechimaru anti-invasion cement ships

=== Parks and gardens ===
- Allay Karasu Kojima Park
- Kure Port-pia Park
- Nagasako Park
- Nikokyo Park
- Ondono-seto and Park
- Setonaikai National Park
- Rekishi-no-mieru-Oka and Park

=== Mountains ===
- Haiga-mine
- Honjo Suigenchi
- Mount Noro
- Mount Yasumi
- Nikyu-kyo

=== Beaches ===
- Kajigahama Beach
- Romantic Beach Karuga

== Festivals ==
- Kure Port Festival
- Kure Fireworks above the Sea (late July or early August)
- Kameyama Shrine Festival (2nd Sunday in October, and the day before)

== Notable people from Kure ==
=== Musicians ===
- Michiru Jo
- Machico
- Miyu Matsuki
- Akira Sakata
- Hitomi Shimatani

=== Authors ===
- Hirofumi Kamigaki
- Hiromu Ono
- Shinji Wada

=== Sports ===
- Fumio Fujimura
- Shinji Hamazaki
- Ryō Hirakawa
- Tatsuro Hirooka

=== Politicians ===
- Rob Lucas

== See also ==
- Bombing of Kure (July 1945)
- Kono Sekai no Katasumi ni
