= Kaita, Hiroshima =

Kaita 海田町
- Town
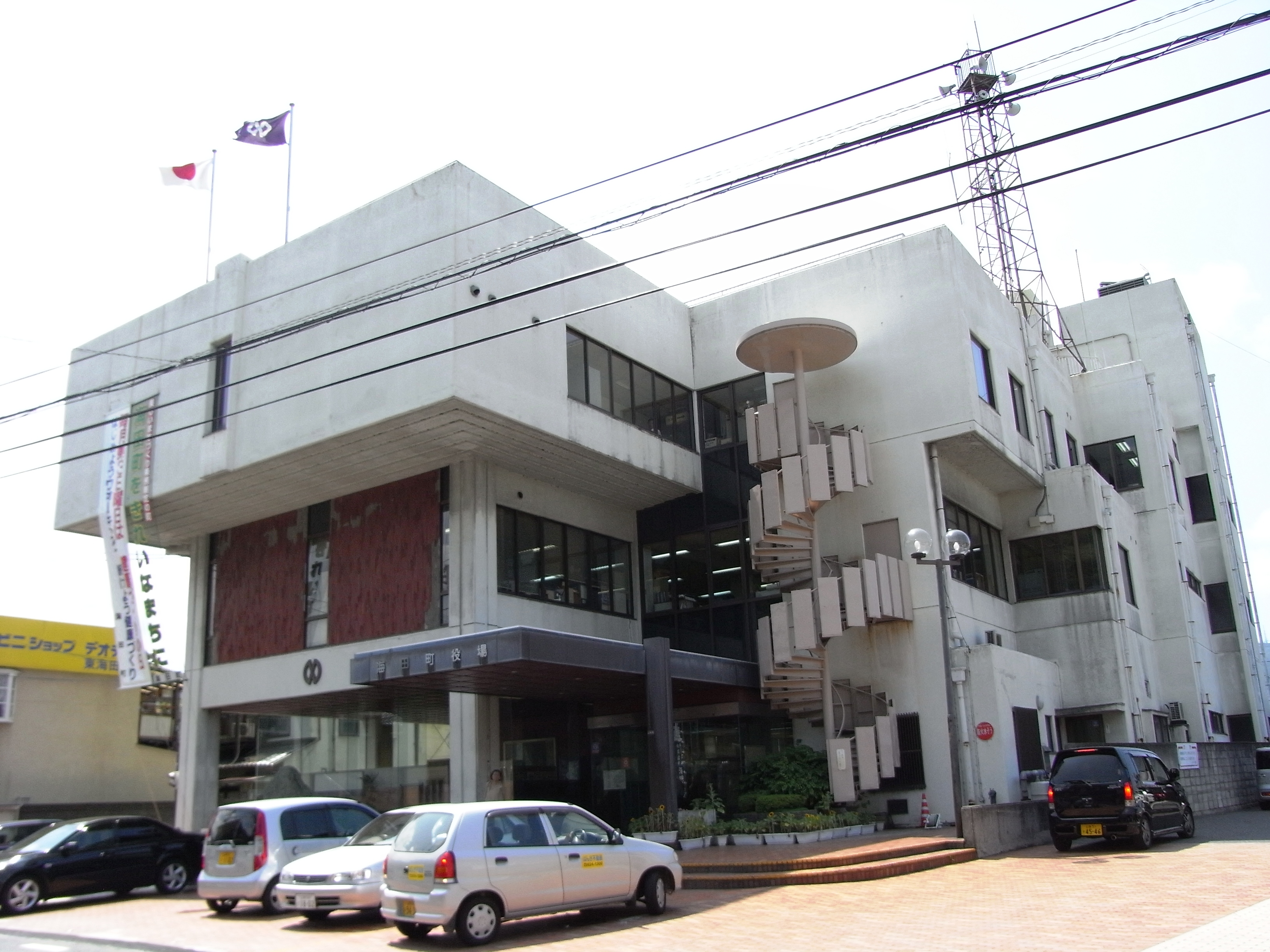
- Kaita Town Hall

- Flag Emblem
- Interactive map of Kaita
- Location in Japan
- Coordinates: 34°22′20″N 132°32′10″E
- Country: Japan
- Region: Chūgoku; San'yō
- Prefecture: Hiroshima
- District: Aki

Area
  - Total: 13.79 km^{2} (5.32 sq mi)

Population (April 30, 2023)
  - Total: 30,608
  - Density: 2,220/km^{2} (5,749/sq mi)
- Time zone: UTC+09:00 (JST)
- City hall address: 14-18 Kamiichi, Kaita-cho, Aki-gun, Hiroshima-ken 736-8601
- Website: Official website
- Symbols
- Flower: Sunflower
- Tree: Cinnamomum camphora

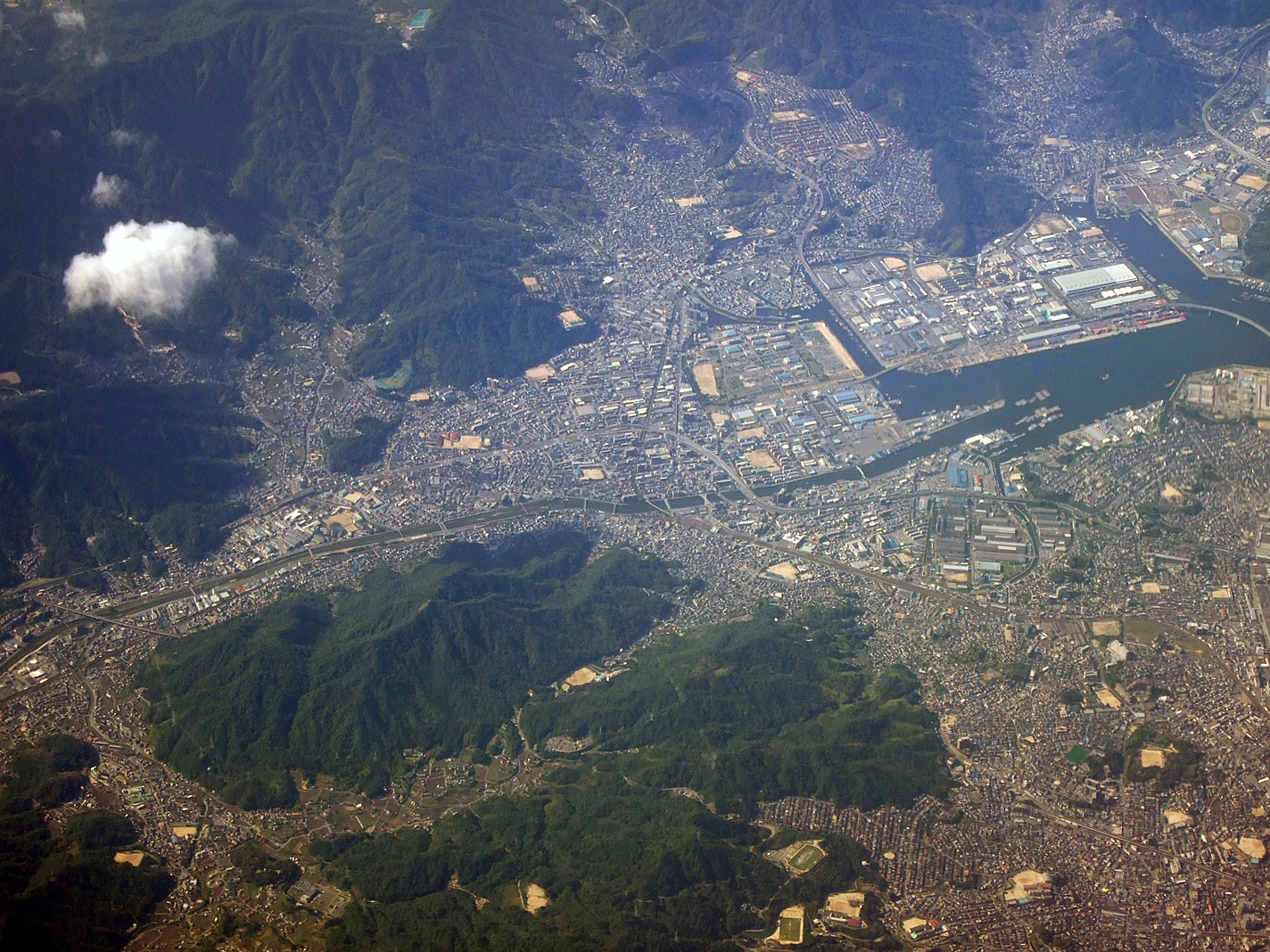
Aerial photograph; Kaita (middle to upper left) Fuchu (bottom right), Saka (upper right)

Kaita (海田町, Kaita-chō) is a town located in Aki District, Hiroshima Prefecture, Japan. As of 30 April 2023, the town had an estimated population of 30,608 in 14,085 households and a population density of 2,200 inhabitants per square kilometre (5,700/sq mi). The total area of the town is 13.79 square kilometres (5.32 sq mi).

== Geography ==
Kaita is located is located in the southwestern part of Hiroshima Prefecture, on the east side of Hiroshima Bay. The old Kaita town center is located at the mouth of the Seno River and has a lot of flat land, while the former Higashi Kaita town is located in a mountainous area with elevations of around 500 to 600 meters.

=== Adjoining municipalities ===
Hiroshima Prefecture

- Aki-ku, Hiroshima
- Kumano
- Saka

=== Climate ===
Kumano has a humid subtropical climate (Köppen climate classification Cfa) with very warm summers and cool winters. The average annual temperature in Kumano is 14.7 °C. The average annual rainfall is 1,543 mm with September the wettest month. The temperatures are highest on average in July, at around 26.2 °C, and lowest in January, at around 3.8 °C.

== Demographics ==
Per Japanese census data, the population of Kaita has been steady for the past 40 years.

Historical population
Year	Pop.	±%
1940	8,354	—
1950	10,980	+31.4%
1960	13,339	+21.5%
1970	24,651	+84.8%
1980	29,934	+21.4%
1990	30,744	+2.7%
2000	30,042	−2.3%
2010	28,477	−5.2%
Kumano population statistics

== History ==
The area of Kaita was part of the ancient Aki Province. In the Edo Period, it was part of the holdings of Hiroshima Domain. People started living in this area during the Jomon period, and the coastline was further inland than it is today. The place name 'Kaita' first appeared in records around the end of the Heian period, when there was a shōen manor owned by the imperial family called 'Kaita-sō' which existed into the Nanboku-chō period. A market town called 'Kaitaichi' developed around the mouth of the Seno River and became a post station on the Sanyōdō highway which connected Kyushu with the Kinai region. Following the Meiji restoration, the town of Kaitaichi and the village of Okukaita were established within Aki District, Hiroshima with the creation of the modern municipalities system on April 1, 1889. The two municipalities were merged on September 30, 1956, to form the town of Kaita.

== Government ==
Kaita has a mayor-council form of government with a directly elected mayor and a unicameral town council of 16 members. Kaita, collectively with the other municipalities of Aki District, contributes three members to the Hiroshima Prefectural Assembly. In terms of national politics, the town is part of the Hiroshima 4th district of the lower house of the Diet of Japan.

== Economy ==
Kaita has a strong industrial base, with many automotive component suppliers related to Mazda located in the town. Kaita is also a commuter town for neighboring Hiroshima. The town is home to the 13th Brigade Headquarters of the Japan Ground Self-Defense Force.

== Education ==
Kaita has four public elementary schools and two public junior high schools operated by the town government, and one public high school operated by the Hiroshima Prefectural Board of Education., and one national public high school.

== Transportation ==
=== Railway ===
JR West (JR West) - San'yō Main Line, Kure Line

- Kaitaichi

=== Highways ===
- National Route 2
- National Route 31
