= Japan National Route 488 =

Road in Japan

National Route 488
- 国道488号
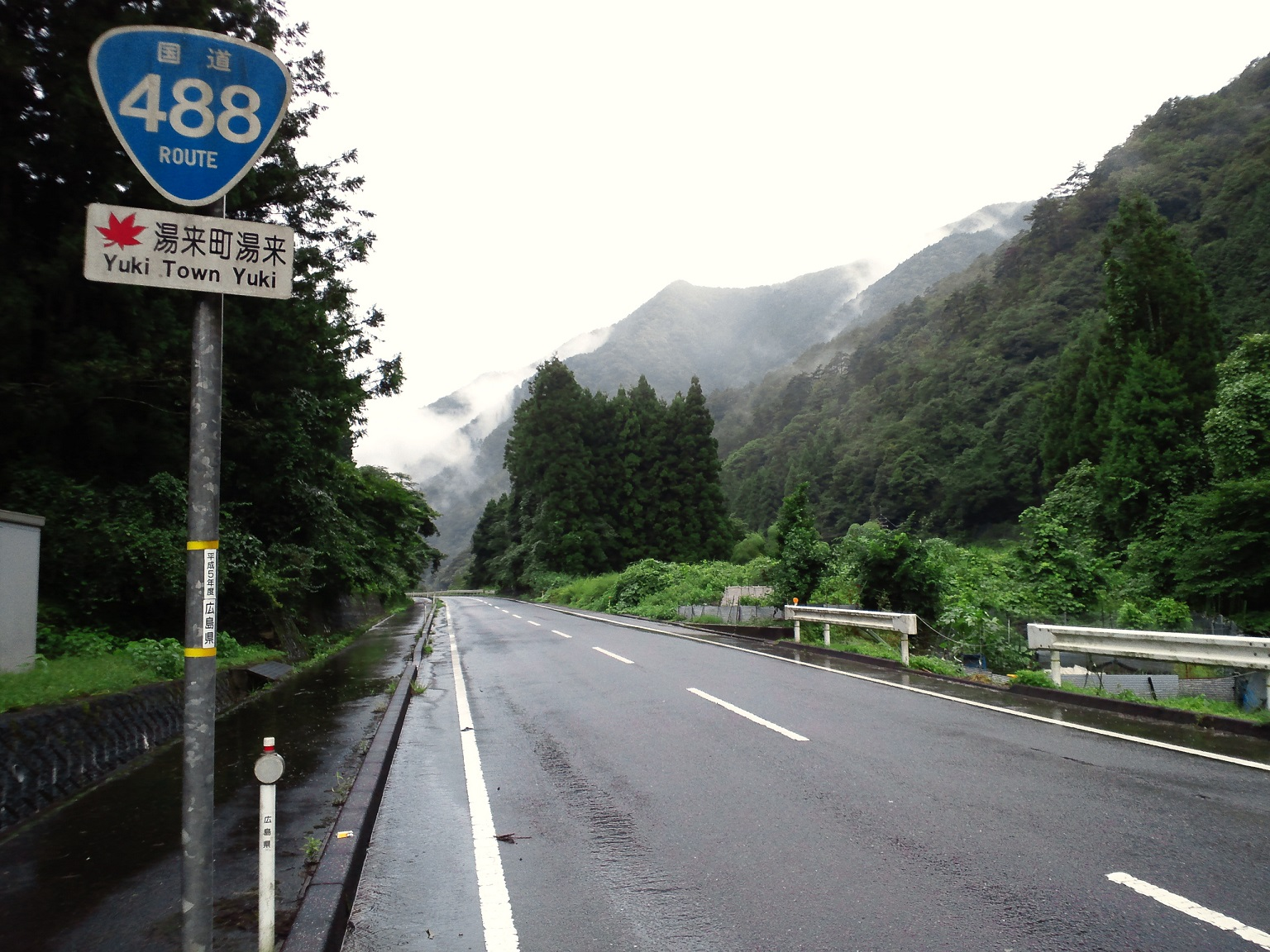

Route information
- Length: 108.9 km (67.7 mi)

Location
- Country: Japan

Highway system
- National highways of Japan; Expressways of Japan
← National Route 487	→ National Route 489

National Route 488 is a national highway of Japan connecting between Masuda, Shimane and Hatsukaichi, Hiroshima in Japan, with total length has 108.9 km (67.66 mi).
