= Shimookada Kanga ruins =

Archaeological site in Japan

- 下岡田官衙遺跡 (Japanese)
- Shimookada Kanga ruins Shimookada Kanga ruins (Japan)
- Interactive map of Shimookada Kanga ruins
- 34°24′07″N 132°30′29″E
- Periods: Nara - Heian period
- Location: Fūchu, Hiroshima, Japan
- Region: San'yō region

Site notes
- Public access: Yes

The Shimookada Kanga ruins (下岡田官衙遺跡, Shimookada kanga iseki) is an archaeological site with the ruins of a Nara to Heian period government administrative complex, located in what is now the town of Fūchu in Hiroshima Prefecture in the San'yō region of Japan. The site has been protected as a National Historic Site from 2018.

== Overview ==
In the late Nara period, after the establishment of a centralized government under the Ritsuryō system, local rule over the provinces was standardized under a kokufu (provincial capital), and each province was divided into smaller administrative districts, known as (郡, gun, kōri), composed of 2–20 townships in 715 AD. Each of the units had an administrative complex built on a semi-standardized layout based on contemporary Chinese design.

The Shimookada Kanga ruins are located on a gentle southwest-facing slope at an elevation of 10 to 60 meters, at the tip of a hill that emerges southwest from a mountain massif in the northeastern part of Hiroshima Bay. Since 1955, a total of 11 archaeological excavations have been carried out. During the excavation from 1963 to 1966, the traces of two tile-roofed stone foundation buildings and wells were discovered. Unearthed roof tiles that have the same characteristics as the Aki Kokubun-ji national temple, and wooden tally strips with place names from Takata District in northern Aki Province, Haji ware and Sue ware pottery, and other wooden objects were excavated. These artifacts indicate that the site was established in the latter half of the 7th century, the tile-roofed buildings were constructed in the middle of the 8th century, and that it was abolished in the first half of the 9th century. The tally strips suggest that the site was a government administrative complex. However, the site is also located the ancient Sanyōdō highway, and it is known through historical documentation that tile-roofed station houses were constructed after the middle of the 8th century, providing horses, meals, and lodging for government officials traveling on official business.

== See also ==
- List of Historic Sites of Japan (Hiroshima)
