= A31 =

A31 or A-31 may refer to:

- A31 cefiro, a series of cars by Nissan
- A-31 Vengeance, an American dive bomber from the World War II era
- Archambault A31, a French sailboat design
- HLA-A31, a human serotype
- Samsung Galaxy A31, a mid-range Android smartphone
- IBM ThinkPad A31 laptop computer, produced circa 2002-2004

== Roads ==
- Highway 31 a.k.a. Autoroute 31
- A31 motorway (Canada), a road in Quebec connecting Joliette and the A40
- A31 road (England), a road connecting Guildford, Surrey and Bere Regis, Dorset
- A31 motorway (France), a road connecting the Franco-Luxembourg border and Beaune
- A31 motorway (Germany), a road connecting the coast of the North Sea near Emden to the Ruhr area
- A31 road (Isle of Man), a road connecting Port St Mary with the Calf Sound
- A31 motorway (Italy), a road connecting Piovene Rocchette and Albettone - Barbarano Vicentino
- A31 motorway (Netherlands), a road connecting Harlingen and Leeuwarden
- A31 motorway (Spain), a road connecting Madrid and Alicante
- A31 highway (Sri Lanka), a road connecting Karaithivu and Ampara

== See also ==
- English Opening, in the Encyclopaedia of Chess Openings (code A31, among others)
- List of highways numbered 31
