= Hiroshima Bay =

- 広島湾 (Japanese)
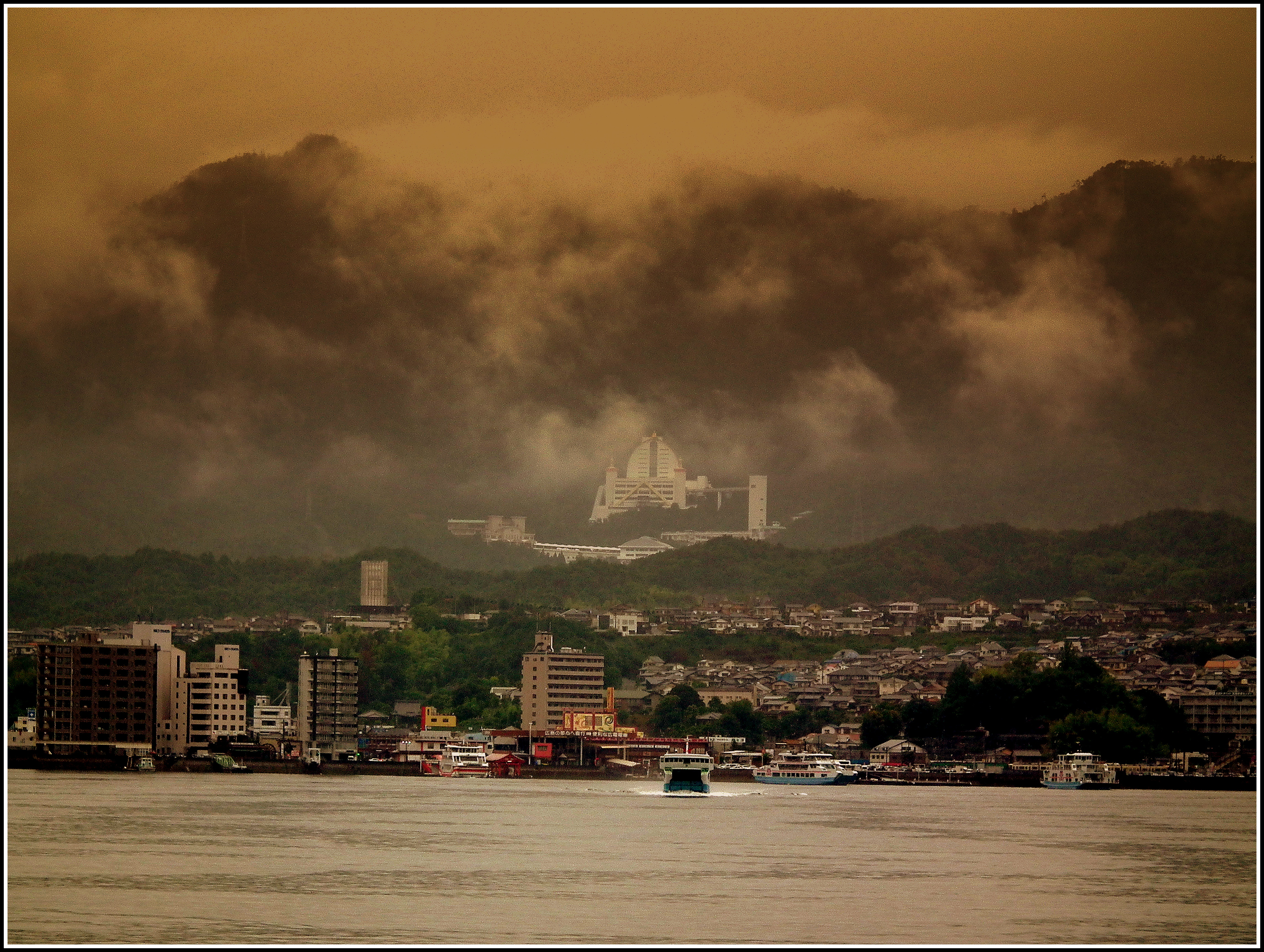
- Miyajima Island, Hiroshima Bay

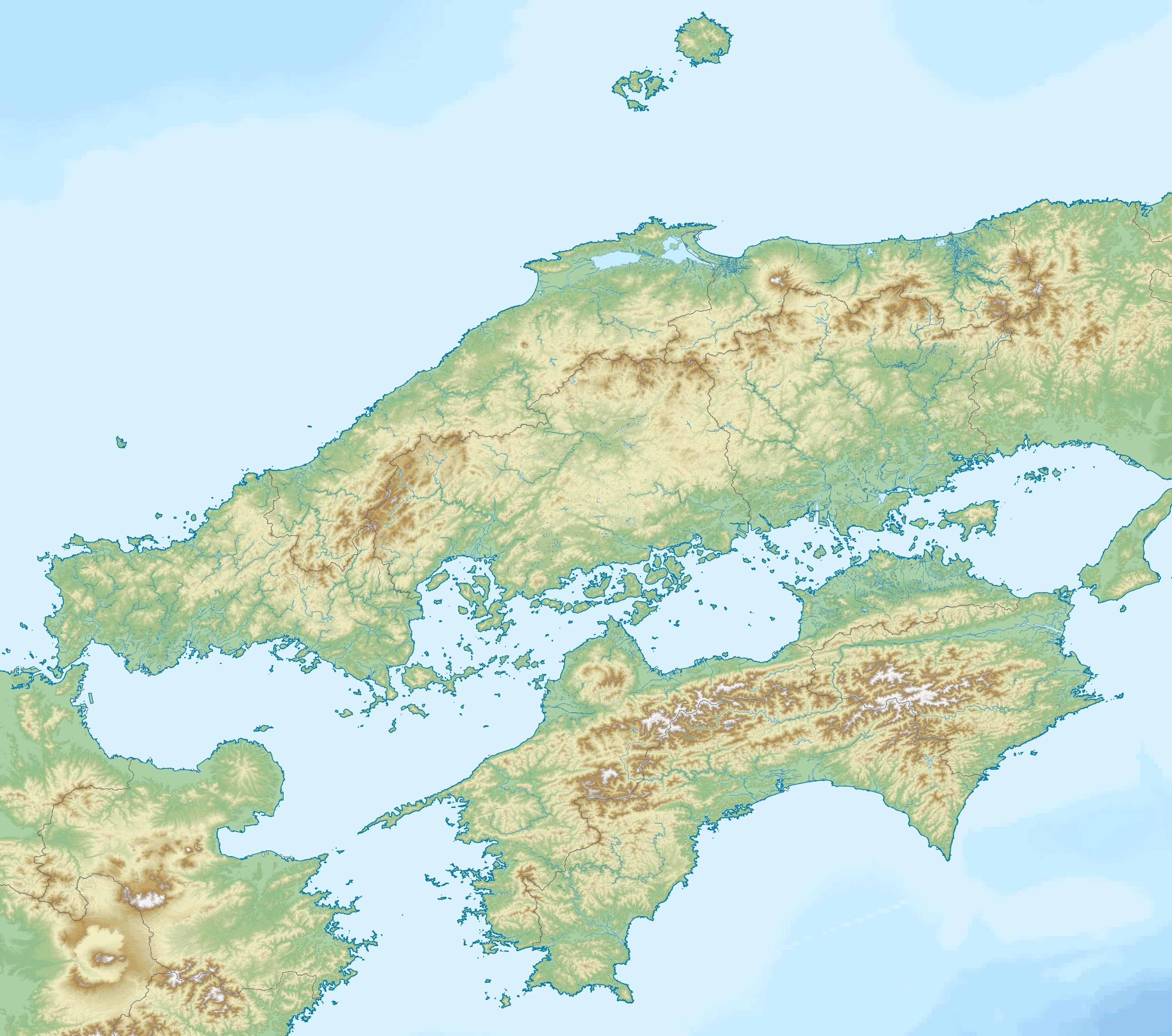
- Location within Chūgoku - Shikoku region Location within Japan
- Location: Inland Sea
- Coordinates: 34°12′N 132°21′E
- Type: Bay
- Surface area: 1,000 square kilometres (390 sq mi)
- Average depth: 25 metres (82 ft)

Hiroshima Bay (広島湾, Hiroshima-wan) is a shallow bay on the southern coast of Honshu, the largest of Japan's islands, in the western part of the Inland Sea. The bay borders Hiroshima and Yamaguchi Prefectures. The city of Hiroshima is situated on its north coast.

== Geography and hydrology ==
The bay is shaped in the form of an ellipse that extends 50 kilometres (31 mi) north to south and 20 kilometres (12 mi) east to west, which works out to a surface area is about 1,000 square kilometres (390 sq mi).

The mean depth is shallow at 25 metres (82 ft) or 25.6 metres (84 ft). Due to "continuous river discharge", there are two layers of the water in the bay: a fresh top layer and a more saline layer below that. The bottom consists mainly of rocks and sand, with some seaweed covering.

The mean water temperature is around 19 °C (66 °F), ranging from 9 °C (48 °F) in March to 29 °C (84 °F) in August.

== Municipalities ==
- Kure, Hiroshima
- Saka, Hiroshima
- Kaita, Hiroshima
- Fuchū, Hiroshima
- Hiroshima
- Hatsukaichi, Hiroshima
- Ōtake, Hiroshima
- Etajima, Hiroshima
- Waki, Yamaguchi
- Iwakuni, Yamaguchi

== Major rivers ==
- Kyōbashi River
- Motoyasu River
- Ōta River
- Oze River
- Tenma River

== Major islands ==
- Kanawajima
- Tōgejima
- Ninoshima
- Enoshima
- Etajima
- Ōnasabijima (Ōnasamitō)
- Ogurokamijima
- Nomijima
  - West Nomijima
  - East Nomijima
- Ōkurokamishima
- Kurahashijima
- Nasakejima
- Atatajima
- Inokojima
- Itsukushima
- Nagashima
- Okinoshima
- Kabutojima

== Fisheries ==
Oyster farming in Hiroshima Bay is said to date back to the 17th century. In 2023, the bay yielded around 20,000 tons of oyster meat per year, accounting for about 60% of Japan's total production. Pacific oysters are harvested between October and May.

In 2004, Hiroshima Bay also provided about 10% of the black seabream, an important commercial fish, in the country. In the 1970s, intensive fishing resulted in a drastically lower catch, but restocking efforts in the northern portion of the bay beginning in 1982 led to a recovery in the late 1980s and '90s, so much so that the price of black seabream declined.

The 21 commercially important fish include:

- Japanese anchovy (Engraulis japonicus)
- Japanese halfbeak, Japanese needlefish or sayori (Hyporhamphus sajori)
- Japanese whiting (Sillago japonica)
- pearl-spot chromis or spottedfin puller (Chromis notata)
- red seabream, red pargo, red porgy or silver seabream (Pagrus major)
- sea ruffe, false kelpfish or dusky stingfish (Sebastiscus marmoratus)
