= Kurahashi-jima =

Island in Hiroshima Bay, Japan

Native name: 倉橋島 Kurahashi-jima
- Location within Japan

Geography
- Location: Seto Inland Sea
- Coordinates: 34°8′0″N 132°31′30″E
- Area: 69.46 km^{2} (26.82 sq mi)
- Length: 13.4 km (8.33 mi)
- Width: 13.4 km (8.33 mi)
- Highest elevation: 491 m (1611 ft)
- Highest point: mount 古観音山 (Kokannon-yama)

Administration
- Japan
- Prefecture: Hiroshima Prefecture
- city: Kure

Demographics
- Population: 19565 (2011)
- Pop. density: 282/km^{2} (730/sq mi)
- Ethnic groups: Japanese

Kurahashi-jima (倉橋島), also called Nagato-jima (長門島) in ancient texts, is an island in Hiroshima Bay located in southwestern Hiroshima Prefecture, Japan.

== Geography ==
The island is roughly T-shaped, with the northern, most mountainous lobe sandwiched between mainland Kure and Etajima island.

== Transportation ==
The island is connected to mainland of Honshu by a pair of bridges over 80 meters wide strait. The island is served by the national route 487. Also, travel by bus is possible since 2005.

== Attractions ==
- Katsurahama - one of the Top 100 beautiful forests of Japan
- Kurahashi shipbuilding museum

== History ==
- 7-8th century - a major center of shipbuilding and port for Yamato period Japan
- 13th century - an outpost against Wokou pirates for Kamakura period Japan
- 1709 - island comes under government of Hiroshima Domain as an important stopover on the trade route to Kaminoseki
- 1860 - coastal artillery fort is built
- 1 April 1889 - establishment of Kurahashi-jima village
- 1890 - with the assignment of island to the Kure Naval District, the access to the island is restricted
- 1 June 1952 - Kurahashi-jima village status is upgraded to "town".
- 4 December 1961 - first bridge connection to the mainland
- 1973 - bridge connection to Etajima
- 2005 - Kurahashi town merged into the expanded city of Kure

== See also ==
- Kurahashi, Hiroshima

== Notes and references ==
- This article incorporates material from Japanese Wikipedia page 倉橋島, accessed 14 August 2017
