= Japan National Route 489 =

National highway in Japan

National Route 489
- 国道489号

Route information
- Length: 44.8 km (27.8 mi)

Location
- Country: Japan

Highway system
- National highways of Japan; Expressways of Japan
| ← National Route 488 | → National Route 490 |

National Route 489 is a national highway of Japan. The highway connects Shunan, Yamaguchi and Yamaguchi, Yamaguchi. It has a total length of 44.8 kilometers (27.8 mi).
