= Shimokamagari, Hiroshima =

Former town in Hiroshima Prefecture, Japan

Shimokamagari (下蒲刈町, Shimokamigari-chō) was a town located in Aki District, Hiroshima Prefecture, Japan.

On April 1, 2003, Shimokamagari was merged into the expanded city of Kure.
