= List of highways numbered 31E =

The following highways are numbered 31E:

== United States ==
- U.S. Route 31E
- New York State Route 31E

== See also ==
- List of highways numbered 31
