= Ondō Bridge =

Road bridge in Japan

Ondoo Bridge
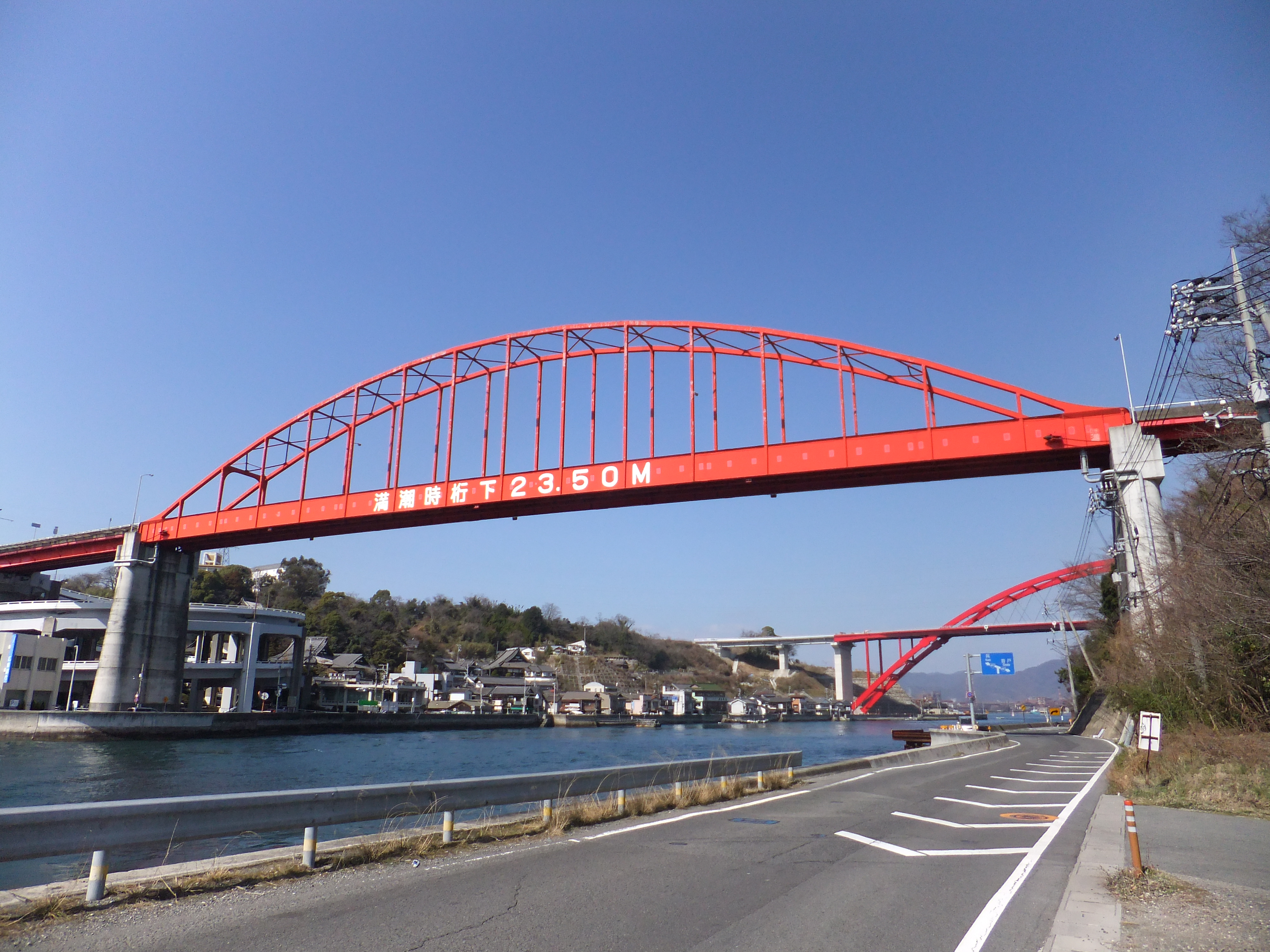
- A panoramic view from the south on the Kegoya side
- Coordinates: 34°11′42″N 132°32′14″E
- Locale: Kure City, Japan; Kegoya 8-chome to Ondocho Hikiji

History
- Engineering design by: Japan Highway Public Corporation
- Opened: December 3, 1961; 63 years ago

Ondō Bridge (音戸大橋, Ondō Ōhashi) also known as Ondoo Bridge and Ondo Bridge is a red road bridge that connects the mainland of Kure City, Hiroshima, with Kurahashi Island (formerly Ondo Town, Aki District).

== History ==
The strait, called "Seto of Ondo" was a Japan-Sung trade route as of 1167 (Eiman first year) in the Heian era.

As a means of crossing the strait since the Edo period, there is a one-way ferry service called "Otodo ferry", which is the shortest toll ferry in Japan with a one-way operating distance of 120 m (390 ft). Since the Meiji era, Kure City became a base for the Imperial Japanese Navy's Kure Naval District, and now the surrounding islands are dotted with facilities of the Kure District Force of the Maritime Self-Defense Force. Kure is also a heavy industry area that draws from the Kure Naval Arsenal. The economic activity of Kurahashijima on the opposite bank depends on Kure City on the Honshu side, and the islanders repeatedly traveled to the gorge to commute to work and school, and it is recorded that the ferry made 250 round trips a day at the peak. In 1932, the steamer connecting the island and Nabe Pier sank. There was also a marine accident that left 29 dead and missing; the cause of the accident was that 137 people were on board a small boat with a capacity of 23 people.

Under these circumstances, in 1961 Ondoo Bridge was built as the first remote island bridge case in the Seto Inland Sea. The Kegoya Ondoo Bypass was constructed to deal with heavy traffic congestion, and in 2013, the Second Ondoo Bridge was erected. The distance between the two bridges is about 350 m (1,150 ft).

The surrounding area is maintained as a tourist destination. Approximately 8,300 azaleas are planted on the mainland side of Ondoo Bridge, and it is crowded with spectators during Golden Week, a flowering season. On the island side of the Second Ondoo Bridge, there is a "Sun Invitation Square". On the other hand, the sidewalk that was not maintained in the (first) Otodo was improved in the second Otodo.

== Construction and economy ==
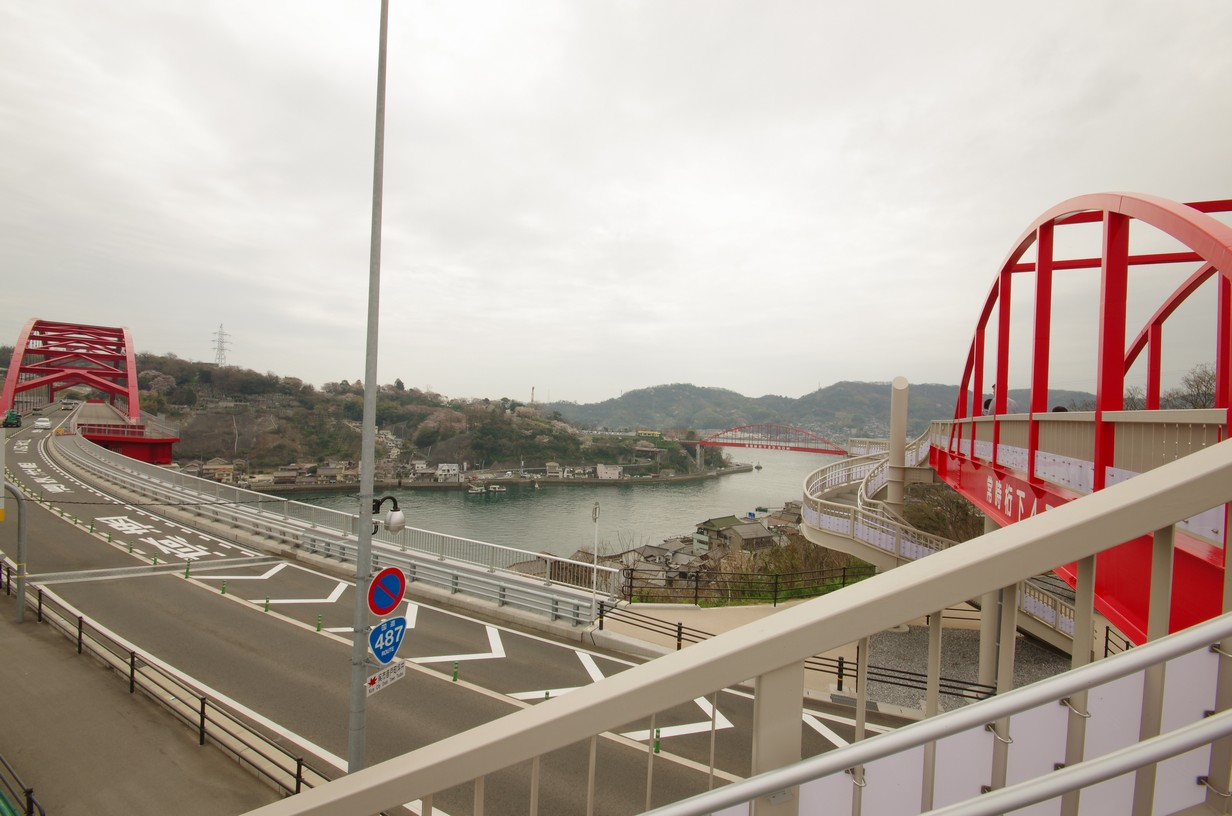
Ondoo Bridge (in background)

Opened on December 3, 1961, the total construction cost 362 million yen. The construction was done by the Japan Highway Public Corporation and the toll road was managed by the Road Public Corporation. Hiroshima Prefecture compensated for the remaining reimbursement of construction costs, and it became free from August 1, 1974, and is currently managed by the prefecture. At the time of opening, a toll booth was set up at the top of the road on the Kegoya side, and the tolls at the time just before the free of charge in 1974 were 120 yen for ordinary cars, 200 yen for buses, 10 yen for bicycles, and 5 yen for pedestrians.

When the Ondoo bridge could not handle the traffic volume and the sidewalk could not be maintained, the Second Ondoo Bridge was constructed.

== Second Ondoo bridge ==
Opened on March 27, 2013, the total construction cost about 8 billion yen. Nicknamed "Sun Invitation Ohashi", it was bridged along with the construction of the Kegoya Otodo Bypass on General National Highway. In 2012, the bridge received the Tanaka Award for Works from the Japan Society of Civil Engineers and the Road Category for All Building Awards in the same year. It is lit up with LED lights from sunset to 10 pm.
