= Kurahashi (surname) =

Kurahashi (written: 倉橋) is a Japanese surname. Notable people with the surname include:

- Norihiko Kurahashi (倉橋 範彦, born 1932), Japanese swimmer
- Yoeko Kurahashi (倉橋 ヨエコ, born 1976), Japanese singer-songwriter
- Yumiko Kurahashi (倉橋 由美子, 1935–2005), Japanese writer

== Fictional characters ==
- Kurahashi (倉橋), a character in the anime series Terror in Resonance
- Hinano Kurahashi (倉橋 陽菜乃), a character in the manga series Assassination Classroom
- Riko Kurahashi (倉橋 莉子), a character in the manga series Love Lab
