= List of highways numbered 31D =

The following highways are numbered 31D:

== United States ==
- Nebraska Link 31D
- New York State Route 31D (former)

== See also ==
- List of highways numbered 31D
