= Kumano, Hiroshima =

Kumano 熊野町
- Town
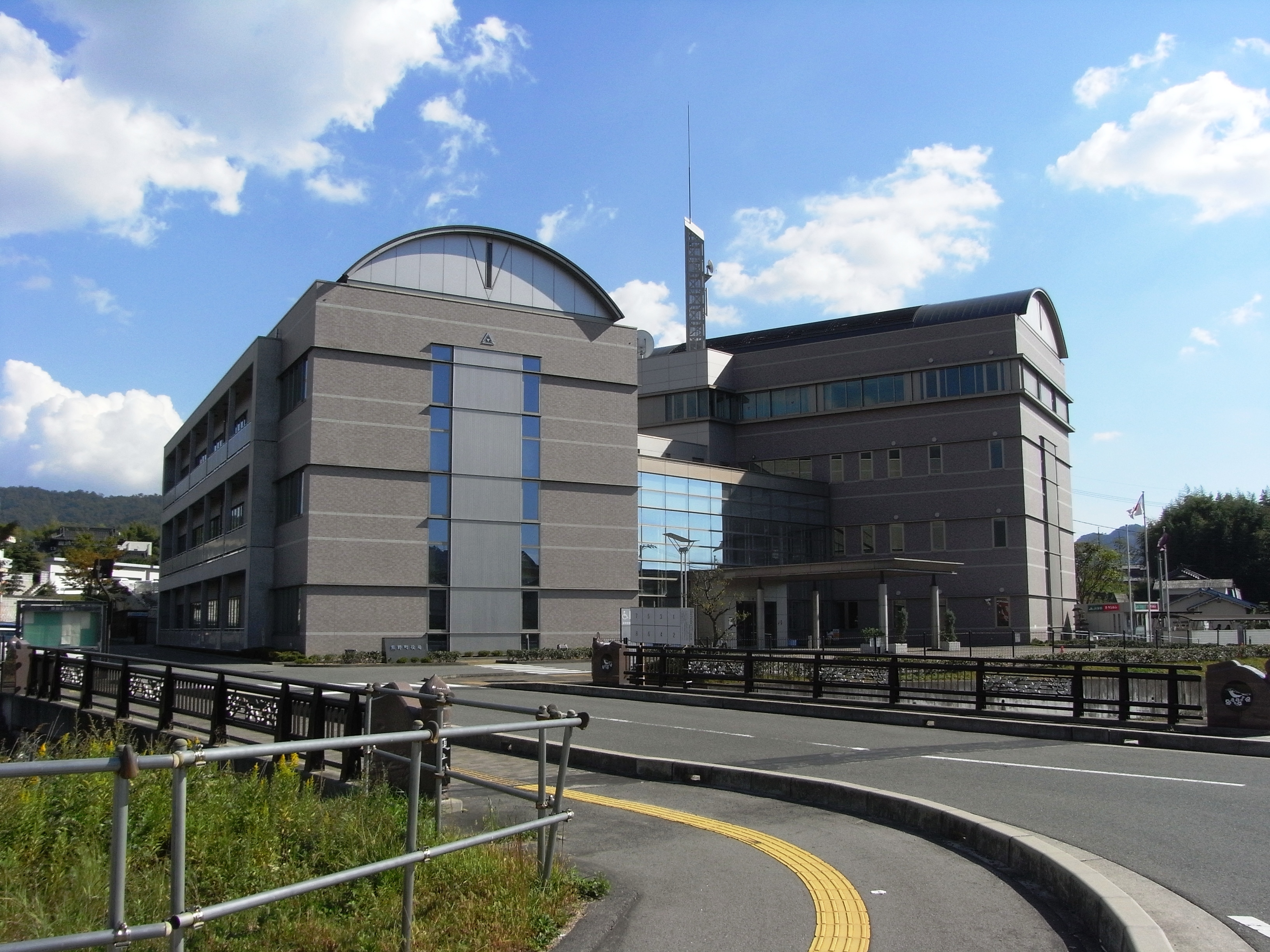
- Kumano Town Office

- Flag Seal
- Interactive map of Kumano
- Location in Japan
- Coordinates: 34°20′09″N 132°35′05″E
- Country: Japan
- Region: Chūgoku; San'yō
- Prefecture: Hiroshima
- District: Aki

Area
  - Total: 33.76 km^{2} (13.03 sq mi)

Population (May 31, 2023)
  - Total: 23,479
  - Density: 695.5/km^{2} (1,801/sq mi)
- Time zone: UTC+09:00 (JST)
- City hall address: 1-1-1 Nakamizo, Kumano-cho, Aki-gun, Hiroshima-ken 731-4292
- Website: Official website
- Symbols
- Flower: prunus mume
- Tree: prunus mume

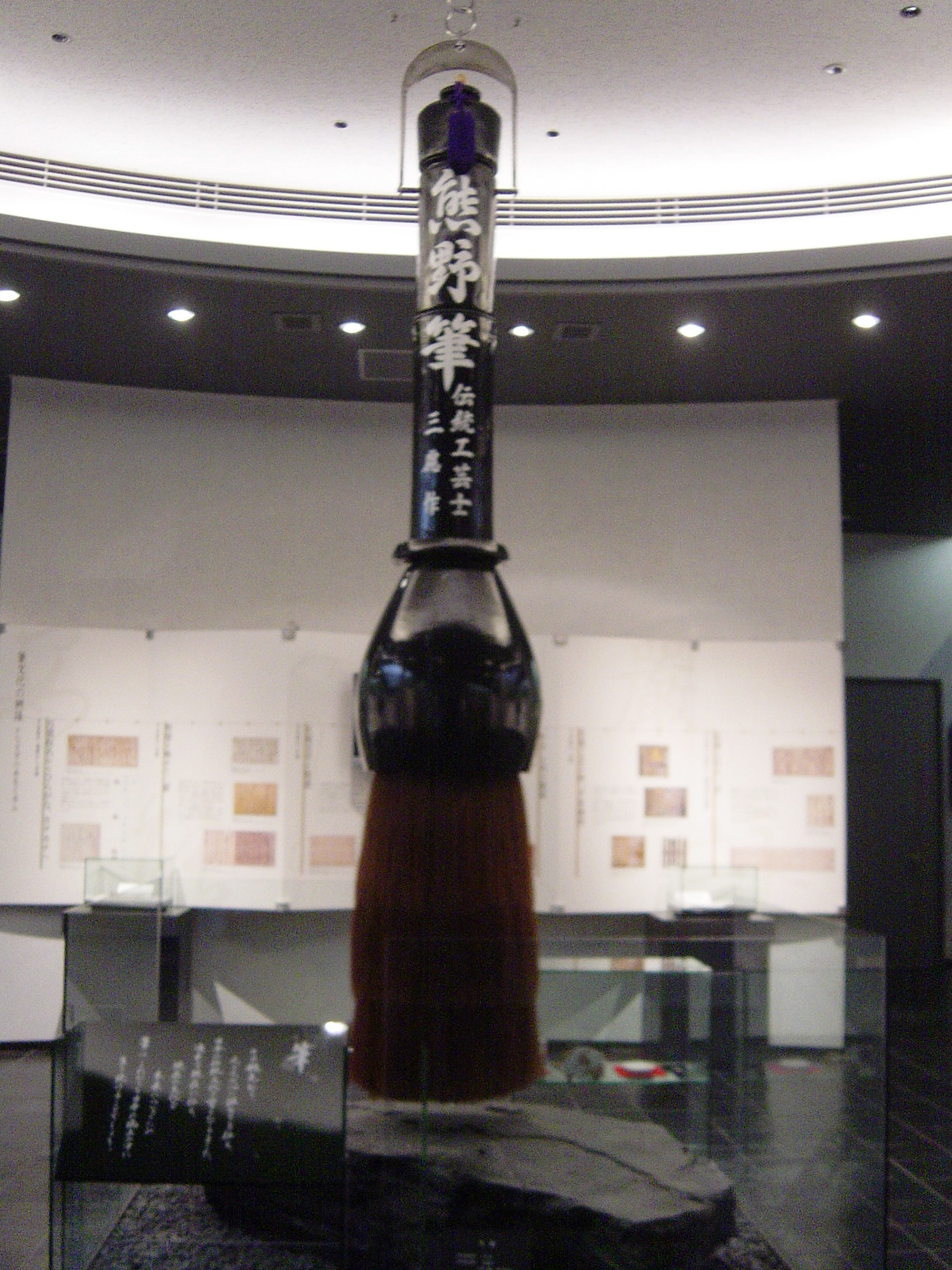
Giant Kumano-fude Japanese brush

Kumano (熊野町, Kumano-chō) is a town located in Aki District, Hiroshima Prefecture, Japan. As of 31 May 2023, the town had an estimated population of 23,479 in 10728 households and a population density of 700 inhabitants per square kilometre (1,800/sq mi). The total area of the town is 33.76 square kilometres (13.03 sq mi). Kumano-cho is famous for the manufacture of brushes called "Kumano-fude" (Kumano-brush).

== Geography ==
Kumano is located in south-central Hiroshima, along the Kumano River, which flows through the Kumano Basin, which is surrounded by mountains on all sides.

=== Adjoining municipalities ===
Hiroshima Prefecture

- Aki-ku, Hiroshima
- Higashihiroshima, Hiroshima
- Kure, Hiroshima

=== Climate ===
Kumano has a humid subtropical climate (Köppen climate classification Cfa) with very warm summers and cool winters. The average annual temperature in Kumano is 15.0 °C. The average annual rainfall is 1543 mm with September as the wettest month. The temperatures are highest on average in July, at around 25.9 °C, and lowest in January, at around 4.6 °C.

== Demographics ==
Per Japanese census data, the population of Kumano has been steady for the past 40 years.

Historical population
Year	Pop.	±%
1940	7,744	—
1950	9,291	+20.0%
1960	9,324	+0.4%
1970	14,884	+59.6%
1980	24,252	+62.9%
1990	25,263	+4.2%
2000	25,392	+0.5%
2010	24,539	−3.4%
Kumano population statistics

== History ==
The area of Kumano was the part of ancient Aki Province. In the Edo Period, it was part of the holdings of Hiroshima Domain. Following the Meiji restoration, the village of Kumano was established within Aki District, Hiroshima with the creation of the modern municipalities system on April 1, 1889. Kumano was raised to town status on October 1, 1918.

== Government ==
Kumano has a mayor-council form of government with a directly elected mayor and a unicameral town council of 16 members. Kumano, collectively with the other municipalities of Aki District contributes three members to the Hiroshima Prefectural Assembly. In terms of national politics, the town is part of the Hiroshima 4th district of the lower house of the Diet of Japan.

== Economy ==
Kumano-cho is traditionally known for production of Japanese brush pens. The town commemorated its 90th anniversary since its establishment in 2008, and announced “The Brush Pen Day” on Spring Equinox for the purpose of reviving brush pen culture and the further development of brush pen industries. The town is increasingly a commuter town for neighboring Hiroshima and Kure.

Population (2010 national census)
Total	age 0-14	age 15-64	age >65	number of household	Resident Foreigners
4,533	3,447	14,551	6,534	9,291	135 (2011)
100%	14.1%	59.3%	26.6%		

Manufacturing Achievement of 2010 Industrial Statistical Survey for factories with more than 4 employees.
Value of shipments per year	20,779,160,000 yen
number of factories	98
number of employees	1,761

== Education ==
Kumano has four public elementary schools and two public junior high schools operated by the town government, and one public high school operated by the Hiroshima Prefectural Board of Education.

== Transportation ==
=== Railway ===
The San'yō Shinkansen passes through Kumano via a tunnel, but the town itself has no passenger railway service. The nearest train station is Yano on the JR West Kure Line.

=== Highways ===
Kumano is not on any national highway or expressway.
