= List of highways numbered 31A =

The following highways are numbered 31A:

== Canada ==
- British Columbia Highway 31A

== India ==
- National Highway 31A (India)

== United States ==
- U.S. Route 31A
- Nebraska Spur 31A
- New Jersey Route 31A (former)
- New York State Route 31A
- Oklahoma State Highway 31A
