= Japan National Route 31 =

National highway in Japan

National Route 31
- 国道31号

Route information
- Length: 20.1 km (12.5 mi)
- Existed: 4 December 1952–present

Major junctions
- North end: National Route 2 at Kaita, Hiroshima
- South end: National Route 185 / National Route 487 at Kure, Hiroshima

Location
- Country: Japan

Highway system
- National highways of Japan; Expressways of Japan
← National Route 30	→ National Route 32

National Route 31 (国道31号, Kokudō Sanjūichi-gō) is a national highway connecting Kaita, Hiroshima and Kure in Japan.

== Route data ==
- Length: 20.1 km (12.5 mi)
- Origin: Kaita, Hiroshima (originates at junction with Route 2)
- Terminus: Kure (ends at the origin of Route 185)
- Major cities: Aki-ku, Hiroshima, Saka

== History ==
- 1952-12-04 - First Class National Highway 31 (from Kaita, Hiroshima to Kure)
- 1965-04-01 - General National Highway 31 (from Kaita, Hiroshima to Kure)

== Intersects with ==
- Hiroshima Prefecture
