= Ondo, Hiroshima =

Town in Japan

Ondo (音戸町, Ondo-chō) was a town located in Aki District, Hiroshima Prefecture, Japan.

As of 2003, the town had an estimated population of 14,294 and a density of 763.16 persons per km^{2}. The total area was 18.73 km^{2}.

On March 20, 2005, Ondo, along with the towns of Kurahashi and Kamagari (all from Aki District), and the towns of Yasuura, Toyohama and Yutaka (all from Toyota District), was merged into the expanded city of Kure and no longer exists as an independent municipality.
