= List of highways numbered 31B =

The following highways are numbered 31B:

== India ==
- National Highway 31B (India)

== United States ==
- Nebraska Spur 31B
- New York State Route 31B (former)
- Oklahoma State Highway 31B
