= List of highways numbered 31C =

The following highways are numbered 31C:

== India ==
- National Highway 31C (India)

== United States ==
- Nebraska Spur 31C
- New York State Route 31C (former)
