= Kurahashi, Hiroshima =

Dissolved municipality in Hiroshima prefecture, Japan

Kurahashi (倉橋町, Kurahashi-chō) was a town located in Aki District, Hiroshima Prefecture, Japan. It was located on the Kurahashi-jima island and surrounding islets in Hiroshima Bay.

As of 2003, the town had an estimated population of 7,193 and a density of 132.13 persons per km^{2}. The total area was 54.44 km^{2}.

On March 20, 2005, Kurahashi, along with the towns of Ondo and Kamagari (all from Aki District), and the towns of Yasuura, Toyohama and Yutaka (all from Toyota District), was merged into the expanded city of Kure and no longer exists as an independent municipality.
