= Japan National Route 487 =

Road in Hiroshima prefecture, Japan

National Route 487
- 国道487号
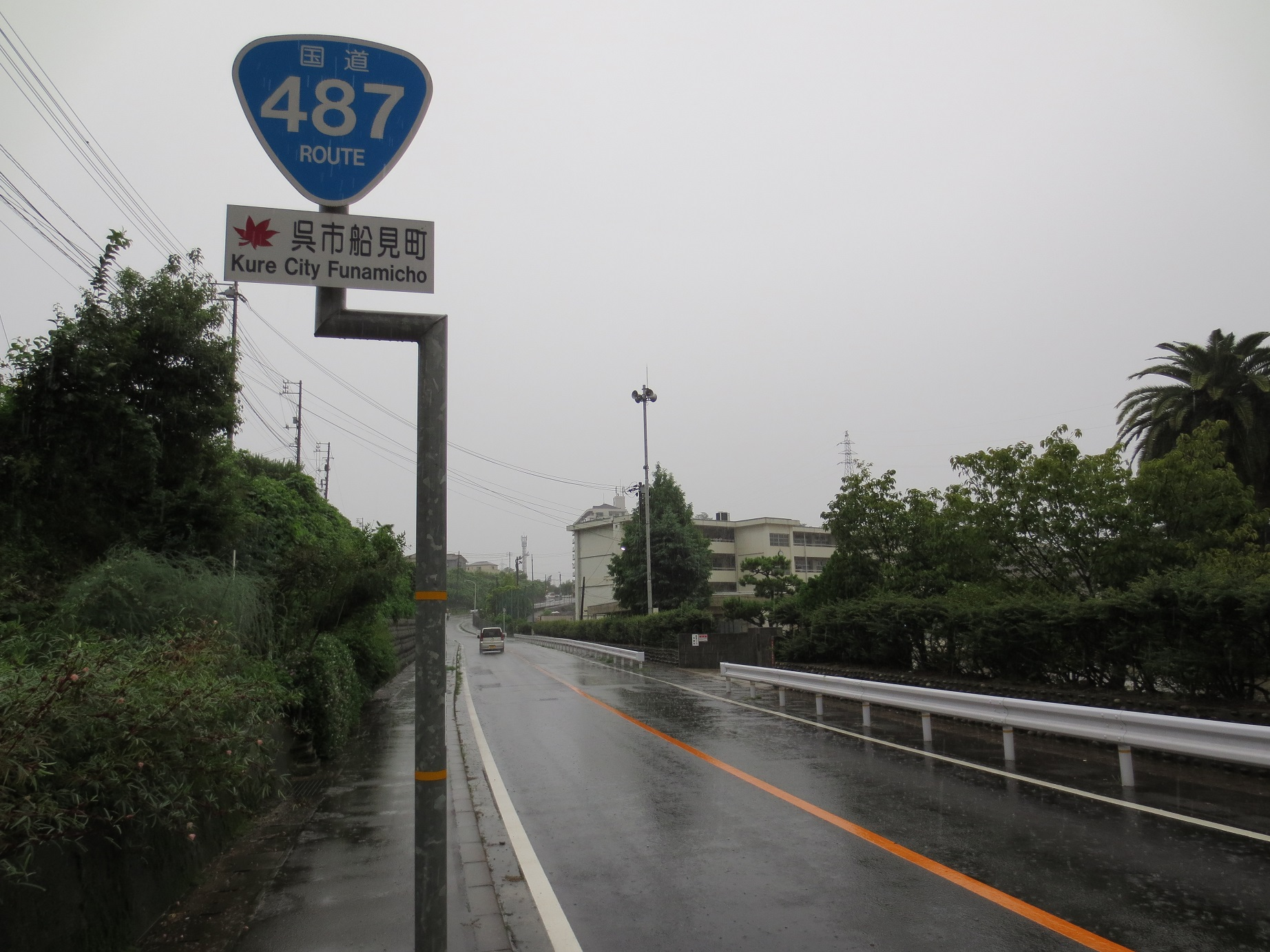

Route information
- Length: 50.3 km (31.3 mi)

Location
- Country: Japan

Highway system
- National highways of Japan; Expressways of Japan
← National Route 486	→ National Route 488

National Route 487 is a national highway of Japan. The highway connects Kure, Hiroshima and Minami-ku, Hiroshima. It has a total length of 50.3 kilometers (31.3 mi).
