= Fuchū, Hiroshima (town) =

Fuchū 府中町
- Town
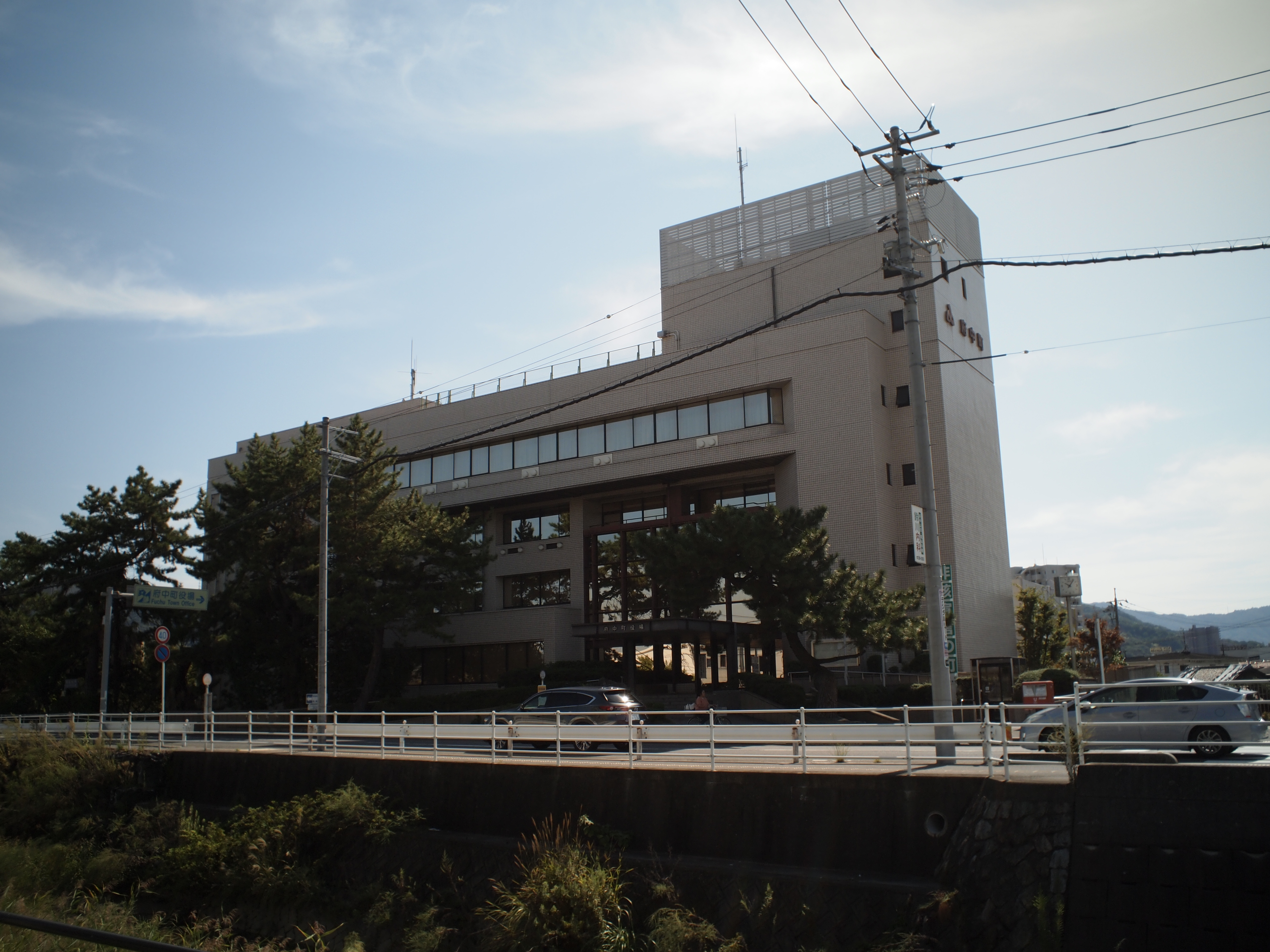
- Fuchū town office

- Flag Emblem
- Interactive map of Fuchū
- Location in Japan
- Coordinates: 34°23′33″N 132°30′16″E
- Country: Japan
- Region: Chūgoku; San'yō
- Prefecture: Hiroshima
- District: Aki

Area
  - Total: 10.41 km^{2} (4.02 sq mi)

Population (February 1, 2024)
  - Total: 52,597
  - Density: 5,053/km^{2} (13,090/sq mi)
- Time zone: UTC+09:00 (JST)
- City hall address: 3-5-1 Odori, Fuchu-cho, Aki-gun, Hiroshima-ken 735-8686
- Website: Official website
- Symbols
- Flower: Camellia japonica
- Tree: Camphora officinarum

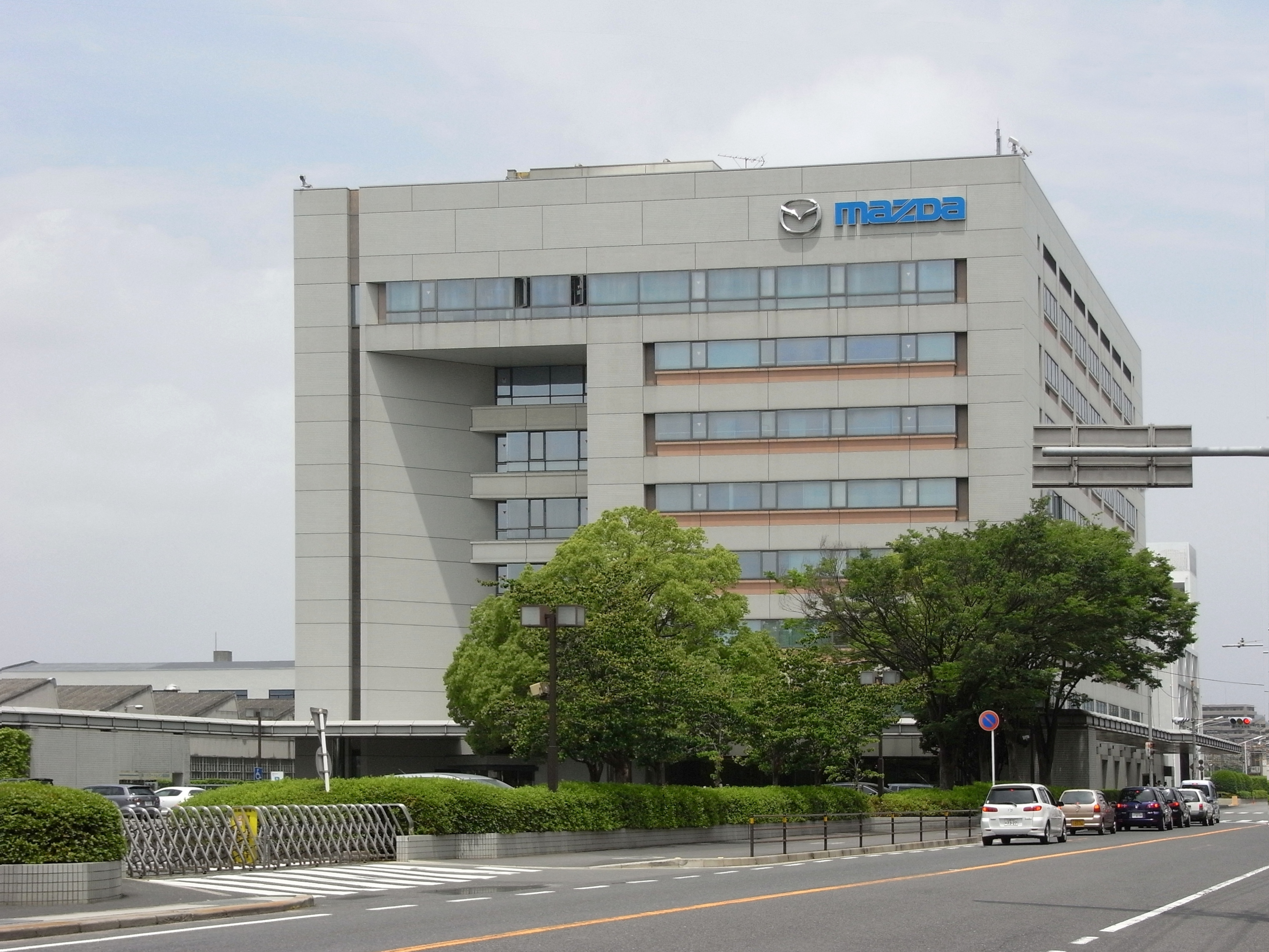
Mazda's headquarters in Fuchū

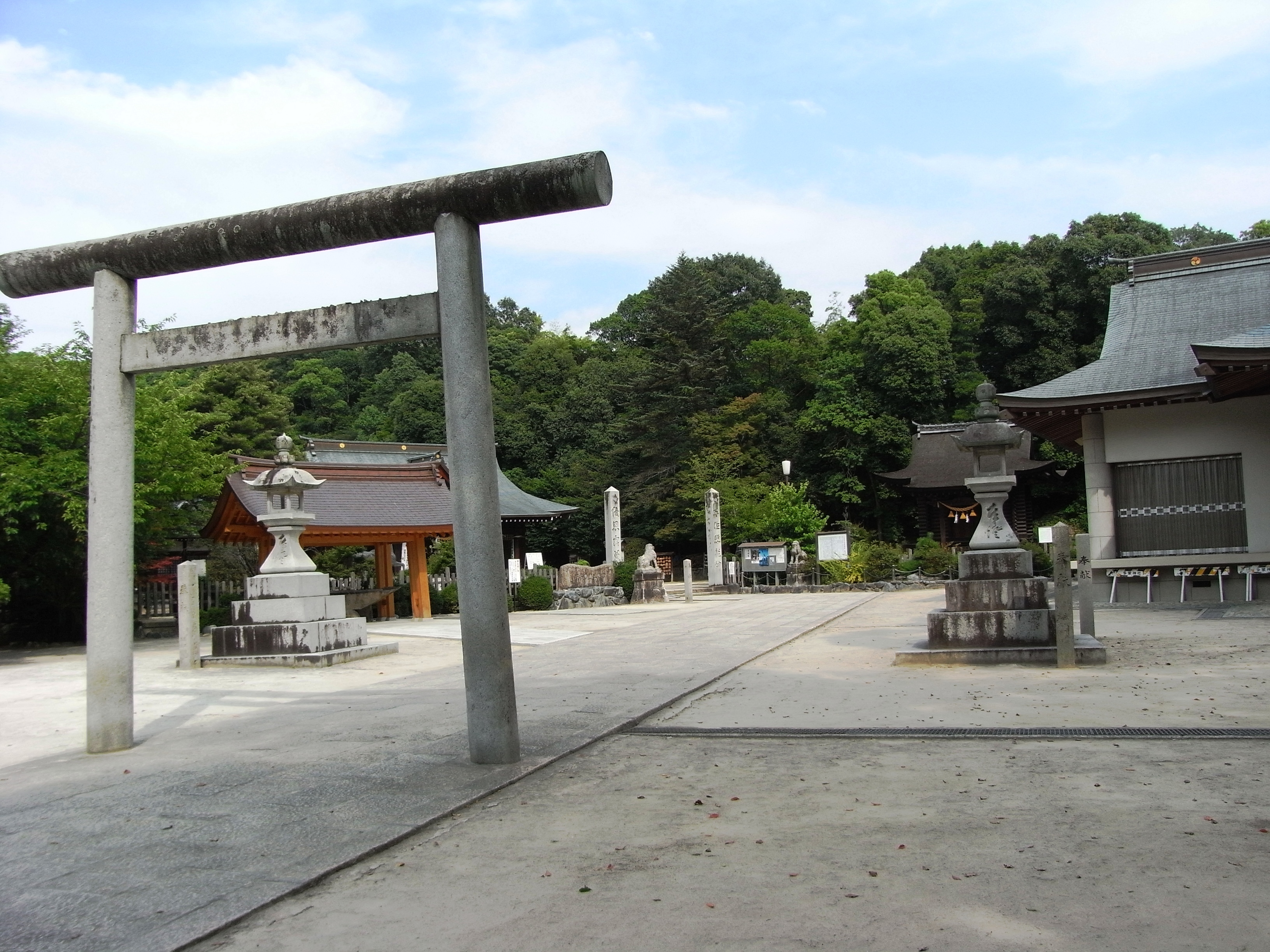
Take Jinja

Fuchū (府中町, Fuchū-chō) is a town located in Aki District, Hiroshima Prefecture, Japan. As of 1 February 2024, the town had an estimated population of 52,597 in 23,930 households and a population density of 5,100 inhabitants per square kilometre (13,000/sq mi). The total area of the town is 10.41 square kilometres (4.02 sq mi).

== Geography ==
Fuchū is located in south-central Hiroshima, at the eastern end of the Ota River delta, the southern part is flat, but the northern part is hilly. The town is completely surrounded by the city of Hiroshima.

=== Adjoining municipalities ===
Hiroshima Prefecture

- Aki-ku, Hiroshima
- Higashi-ku, Hiroshima
- Minami-ku, Hiroshima

=== Climate ===
Fuchū has a humid subtropical climate (Köppen climate classification Cfa) with very warm summers and cool winters. The average annual temperature in Fuchū is 14.7 °C. The average annual rainfall is 1601 mm with September as the wettest month. The temperatures are highest on average in July, at around 26.2 °C, and lowest in January, at around 3.8 °C.

== Demographics ==
Per Japanese census data, the population of Fuchū has been steady for the past 30 years.

Historical population
Year	Pop.	±%
1940	7,257	—
1950	11,408	+57.2%
1960	17,104	+49.9%
1970	40,302	+135.6%
1980	47,817	+18.6%
1990	50,060	+4.7%
2000	50,673	+1.2%
2010	50,448	−0.4%
Fuchu population statistics

== History ==
The area of Fuchū was the center of ancient Aki Province, and the location of the Kofun period Kamiokada Kofun, Nara period Shimookada Kanga ruins and the Heian period provincial capital of the province. In the Edo Period, it was part of the holdings of Hiroshima Domain. Following the Meiji restoration, the village of Fuchū was established within Aki District, Hiroshima with the creation of the modern municipalities system on April 1, 1889. Fuchū was raised to town status on January 1, 1937.

== Government ==
Fuchū has a mayor-council form of government with a directly elected mayor and a unicameral town council of 18 members. Fuchū contributes three members to the Hiroshima Prefectural Assembly. In terms of national politics, the town is part of the Hiroshima 4th district of the lower house of the Diet of Japan.

== Economy ==
The main industry of Fuchū is the automobile industry, as the town has the headquarters of Mazda.

== Education ==
Fuchū has five public elementary schools and two public junior high schools operated by the town government, and one public high school operated by the Hiroshima Prefectural Board of Education.

== Transportation ==
=== Railway ===
JR West (JR West) - San'yō Main Line

- Mukainada

=== Highways ===
Fuchū is not on any national highway or expressway.

== Notable people from Fuchū ==
- Kōji Kikkawa, musician
- Tite Kubo, manga artist
- Satoshi Murayama, professional shogi player
- Kentaro Nishimura, professional baseball player and coach
- Naoki Otani, former professional footballer
- Taishi Semba, professional football player for Mito HollyHock
- Kensō Soai, organic chemist
