= Saka, Hiroshima =

Saka 坂町
- Town
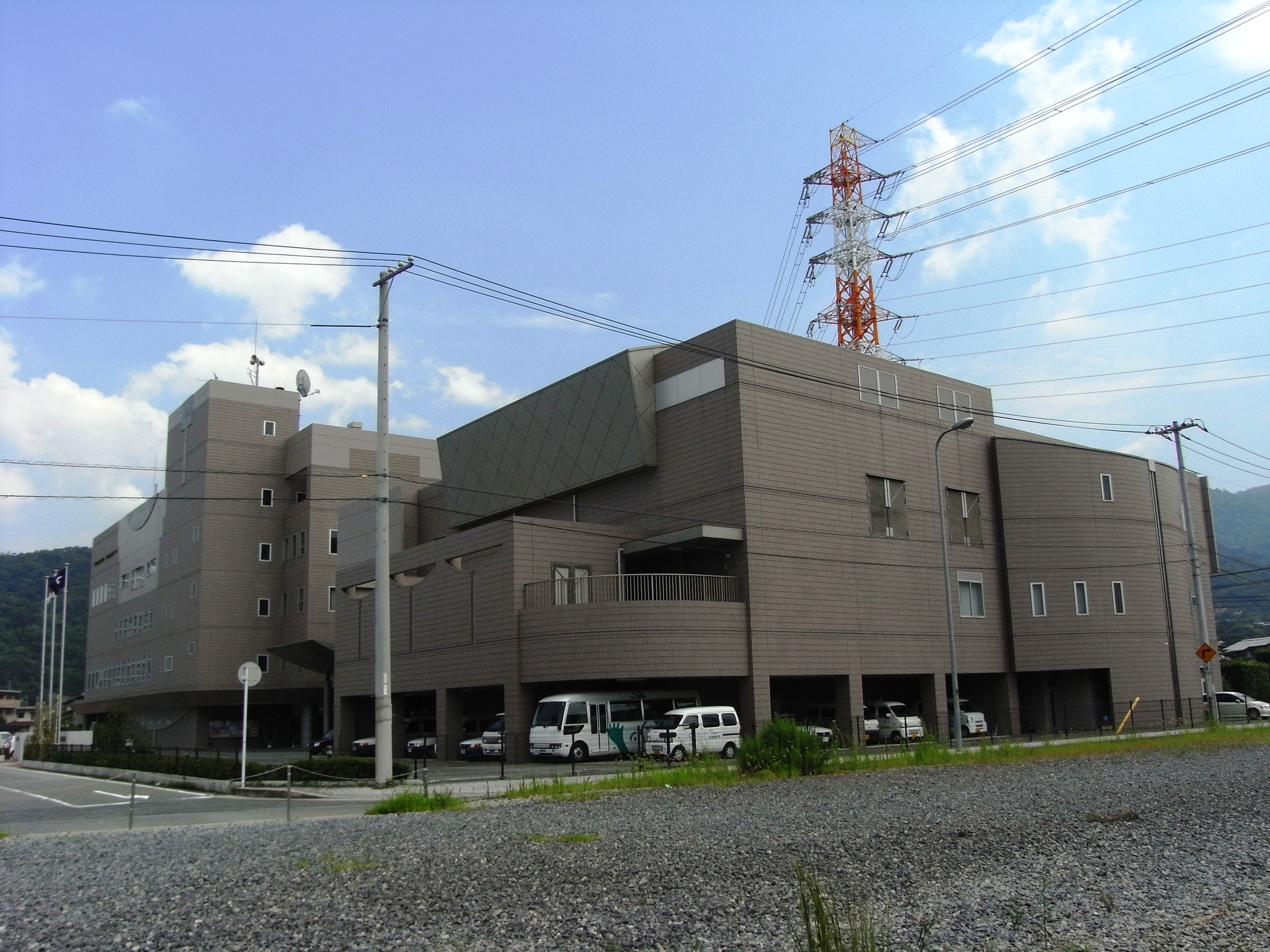
- Saka Town Hall

- Flag Chapter
- Location of Saka in Hiroshima Prefecture

- Location in Japan
- Coordinates: 34°20′28″N 132°30′49″E
- Country: Japan
- Region: Chūgoku; San'yō
- Prefecture: Hiroshima
- District: Aki

Area
  - Total: 15.69 km^{2} (6.06 sq mi)

Population (1 June 2023)
  - Total: 12,853
  - Density: 819.2/km^{2} (2,122/sq mi)
- Time zone: UTC+09:00 (JST)
- City hall address: 1-1-1 Heigahama, Saka-cho, Aki-gun, Hiroshima-ken 731-4393
- Website: Official website
- Symbols
- Bird: Warbling white-eye
- Flower: Japanese Morning Glory
- Tree: Prunus mume

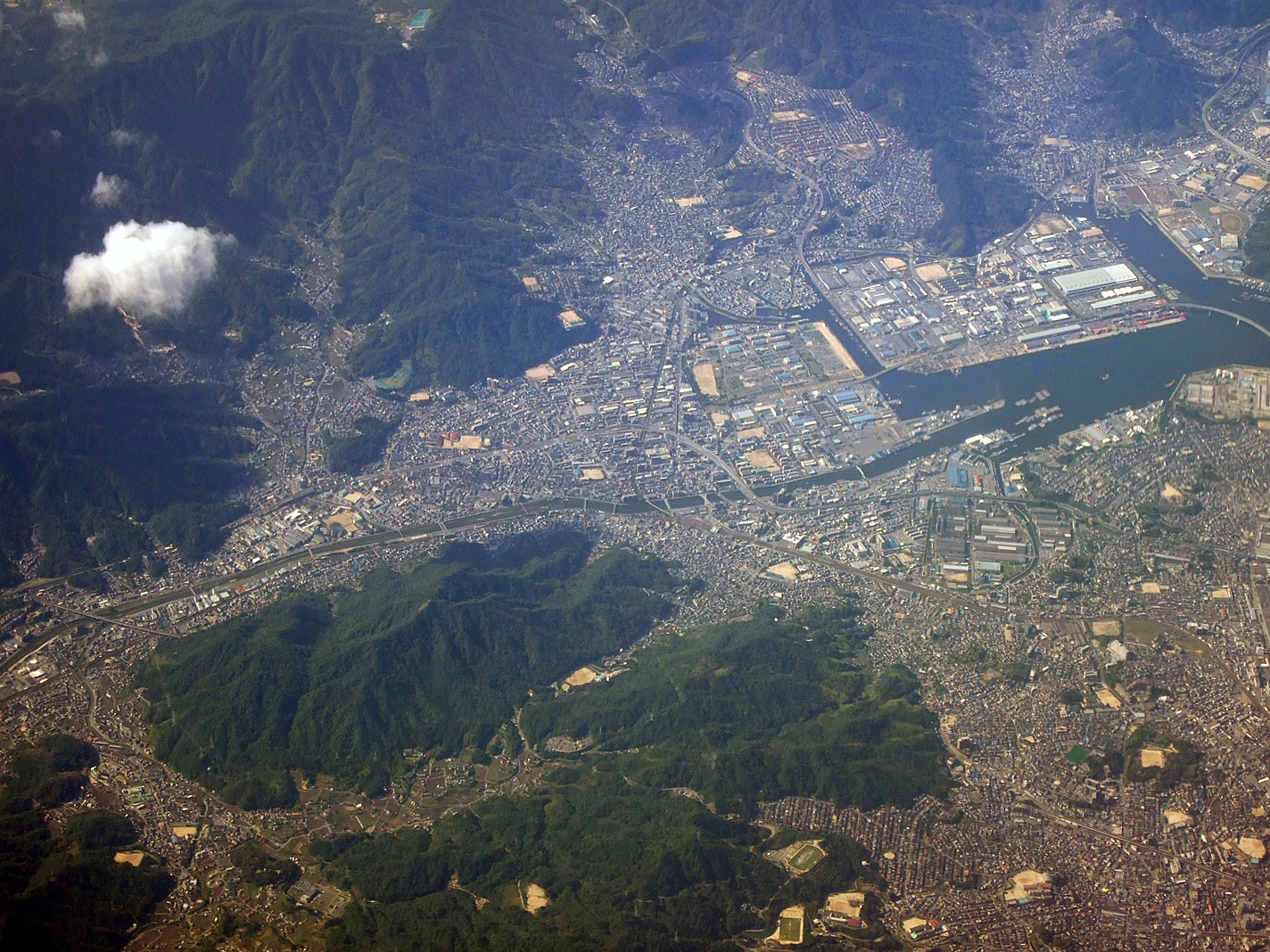
Aerial photograph; Kaita (middle to upper left) Fuchu (bottom right), Saka (upper right)

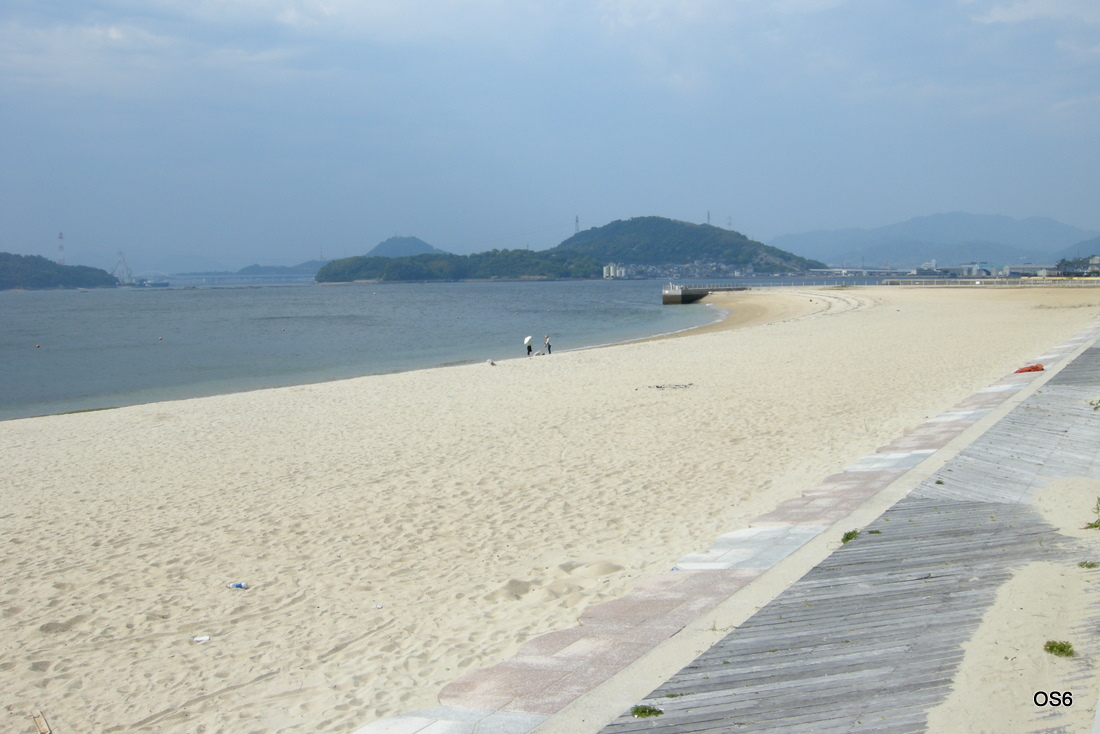
Bayside Beach in Saka

Saka (坂町, Saka-chō) is a town located in Aki District, Hiroshima Prefecture, Japan. As of 31 May 2023, the town had an estimated population of 12,853 in 5879 households and a population density of 820 inhabitants per square kilometre (2,100/sq mi). The total area of the town is 15.69 square kilometres (6.06 sq mi).

== Geography ==
Saka is located on the coast of Hiroshima Bay in south-central Hiroshima. A sits name implies, the area is very hilly and despite dense urbanization, forests cover over 50% of the town area.

=== Adjoining municipalities ===
Hiroshima Prefecture

- Aki-ku, Hiroshima
- Kaita
- Kure
- Minami-ku, Hiroshima

=== Climate ===
Saka has a humid subtropical climate (Köppen climate classification Cfa) with very warm summers and cool winters. The average annual temperature in Saka is 15.3 °C. The average annual rainfall is 1543 mm with September as the wettest month. The temperatures are highest on average in July, at around 26.3 °C, and lowest in January, at around 5.0 °C.

== Demographics ==
Per Japanese census data, the population of Saka has been steady for the past 60 years.

Historical population
Year	Pop.	±%
1940	9,692	—
1950	14,089	+45.4%
1960	13,713	−2.7%
1970	14,223	+3.7%
1980	13,350	−6.1%
1990	13,083	−2.0%
2000	12,276	−6.2%
2010	13,267	+8.1%
Saka population statistics

== History ==
The area of Saka was the part of ancient Aki Province. In the Edo Period, it was part of the holdings of Hiroshima Domain. Following the Meiji restoration, the village of Saka was established within Aki District, Hiroshima with the creation of the modern municipalities system on April 1, 1889. Saka was raised to town status on August 1, 1950.

== Government ==
Saka has a mayor-council form of government with a directly elected mayor and a unicameral town council of 12 members. Saka, collectively with the other municipalities of Aki District contributes three members to the Hiroshima Prefectural Assembly. In terms of national politics, the town is part of the Hiroshima 4th district of the lower house of the Diet of Japan.

The current mayor of Saka, Takayuki Yoshida (72), had run unopposed for the nine elections preceding the 2025 mayoral election, which was the first contested mayoral election for the town in 44 years.

== Economy ==
Saka is a regional commercial center and a commuter town for neighboring Hiroshima.

== Education ==
Saka has three public elementary schools and one public junior high school operated by the town government, and one public high school operated by the Hiroshima Prefectural Board of Education. The Hiroshima Prefectural Police Academy is located in Saka.

== Transportation ==
=== Railway ===
JR West (JR West) - Kure Line

- Koyaura - Mizushiri - Saka

=== Highways ===
- Hiroshima-Kure Road
- National Route 31
