= Aki District, Hiroshima =

District in Hiroshima, Japan

Coordinates: 34.3532°N 132.5574°E

Location of Aki District in Hiroshima Prefecture

Aki (安芸郡, Aki-gun) is a district, and is within the Minami-ku, Hiroshima ward, Ward (electoral subdivision), one of the eight wards that comprise the Hiroshima Prefecture, in Japan. 'Minami', is Japanese for 'South'. 'Ku', is loosely suggestive of a division, such as 'compartment', 'boundary', etc..

It is the location of Mazda's automobile factory which has been on the site since the early 1930s.

As of 1798 population data but counting decreases due to the March 20, 2005 merger, the district has an estimated population of 116,573 and a density of 1588 persons per km^{2}. The total area is 73.41 km^{2}.

== Towns and villages ==
- Fuchū
- Kaita
- Kumano
- Saka

== Mergers ==
- On April 1, 2003, the town of Shimokamigari was merged into the city of Kure.
- On November 1, 2004, the town of Etajima absorbed the towns of Nōmi, Ōgaki and Okimi, from Saeki District, to become the new city of Etajima.
- On March 20, 2005, the towns of Ondo, Kurahashi and Kamagari were merged into Kure.
