= Hiro Station =

Railway station in Kure, Hiroshima Prefecture, Japan

Hiro Station 広駅
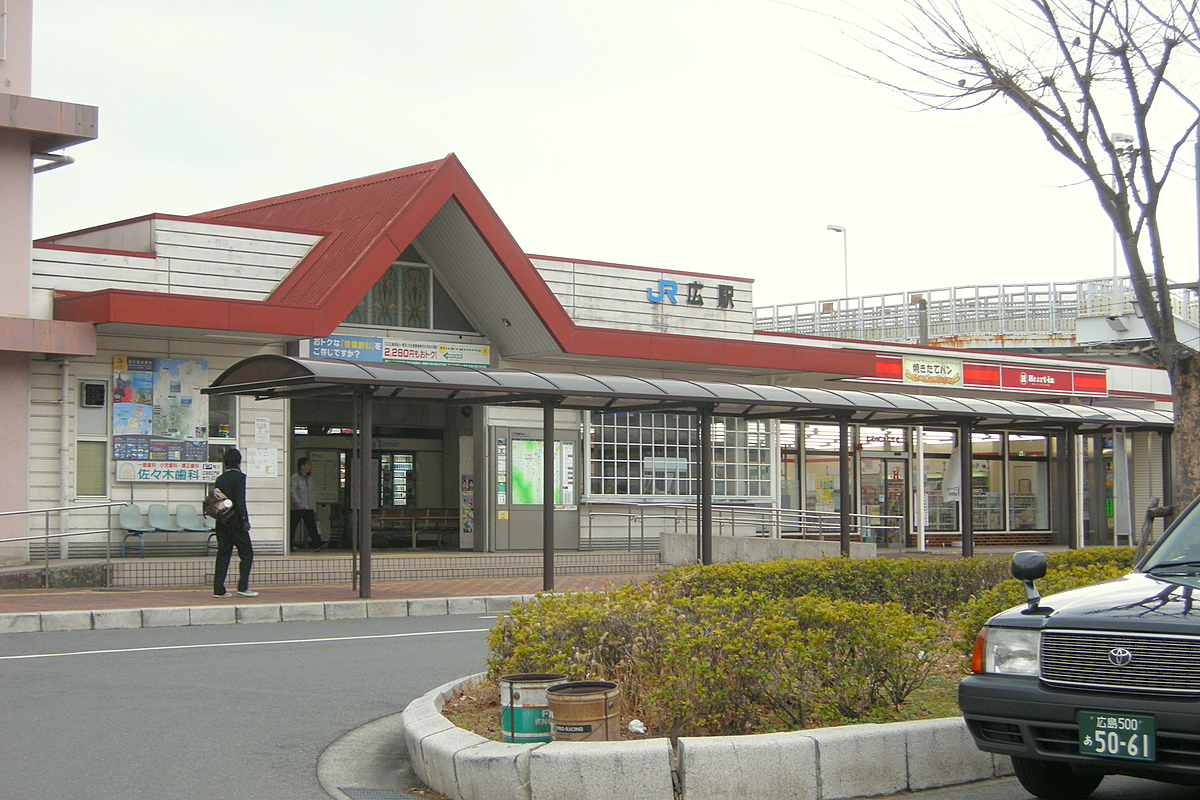
- Hiro Station

General information
- Location: 1 Hironakachō, Kure-shi, Hiroshima-ken 737-0131; Japan
- Coordinates: 34°13′42.89″N 132°37′42.58″E
- Owner: West Japan Railway Company
- Operator: West Japan Railway Company
- Line: Y Kure Line
- Distance: 60.2 km (37.4 miles) from Mihara
- Platforms: 1 side + 1 island platform
- Tracks: 3
- Connections: Bus stop

Construction
- Structure type: Ground level
- Cycle facilities: Yes
- Accessible: No

Other information
- Status: Staffed
- Station code: JR-Y17
- Website: Official website

History
- Opened: 24 March 1935

Passengers
- FY2019: 3640

Services
Preceding station	JR West	Following station
Shin-Hiro towards Hiroshima	Kure Line Local	Nigata towards Mihara
Location
- Location within Hiroshima Prefecture Location within Japan

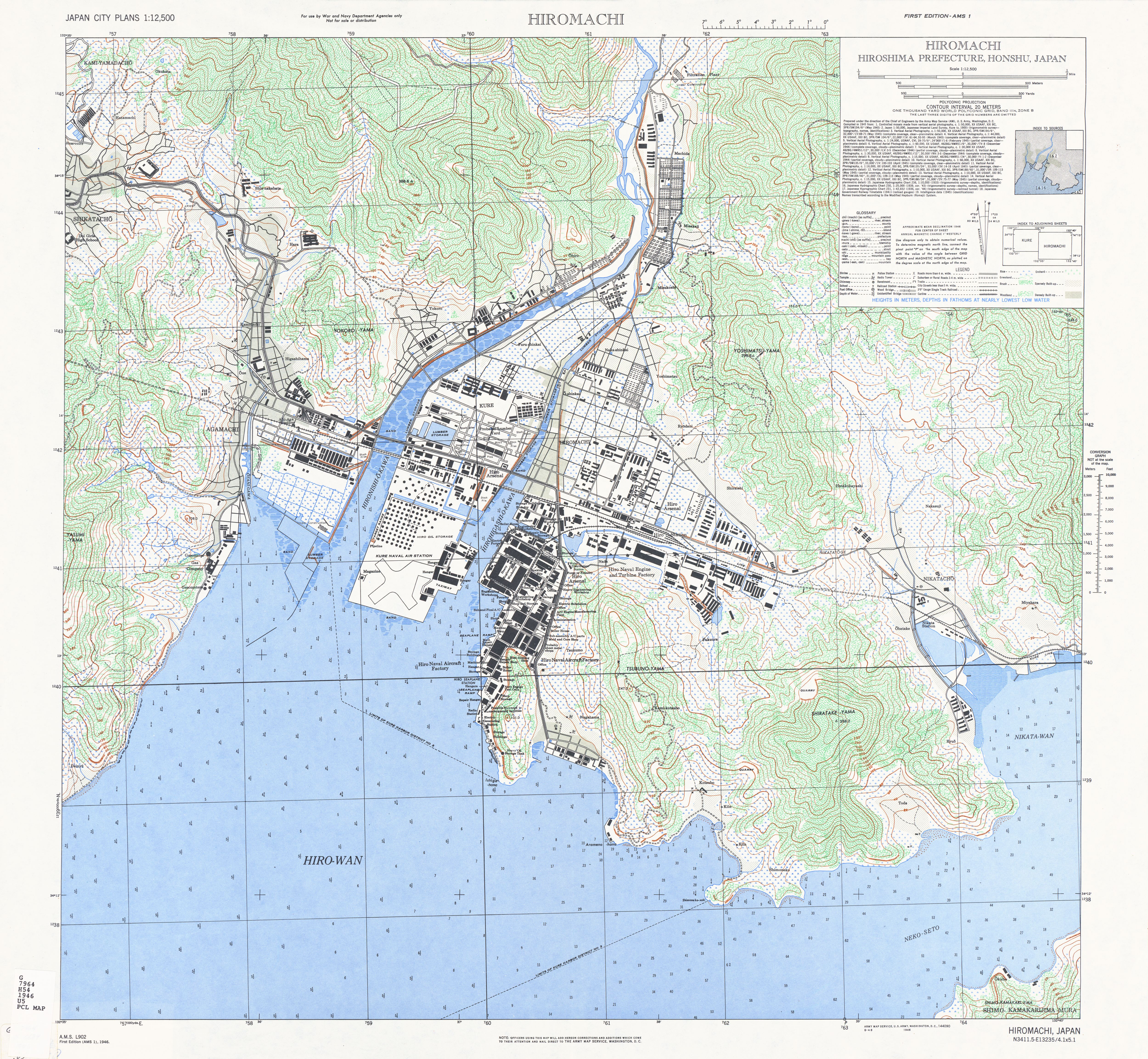
A district map created by the U.S. Military in 1945.

Hiro Station (広駅, Hiro-eki) is a passenger railway station located in the city of Kure, Hiroshima Prefecture, Japan. It is operated by the West Japan Railway Company (JR West).

== Lines ==
Hiro Station is served by the JR West Kure Line, and is located 60.2 kilometers from the terminus of the line at Mihara.

== Station layout ==
The station consists of one side platform and one island platform connected by a footbridge. The station is staffed.

== Platforms ==
1, 2, 3	■ Y Kure Line	for Takehara and Mihara for Kure and Hiroshima

== History ==
Hiro Station was opened on 24 March 1935. With the privatization of the Japanese National Railways (JNR) on 1 April 1987, the station came under the control of JR West.

== Passenger statistics ==
In fiscal 2019, the station was used by an average of 3640 passengers daily.

== Surrounding area ==
- Kure City Gymnasium (Oak Arena)
- Kure Driving School

Hiroshima Prefectural Hiro High School

- Japan National Route 185

== See also ==
- List of railway stations in Japan
