= Akinagahama Station =

Railway station in Takehara, Hiroshima Prefecture, Japan

Akinagahama Station 安芸長浜駅
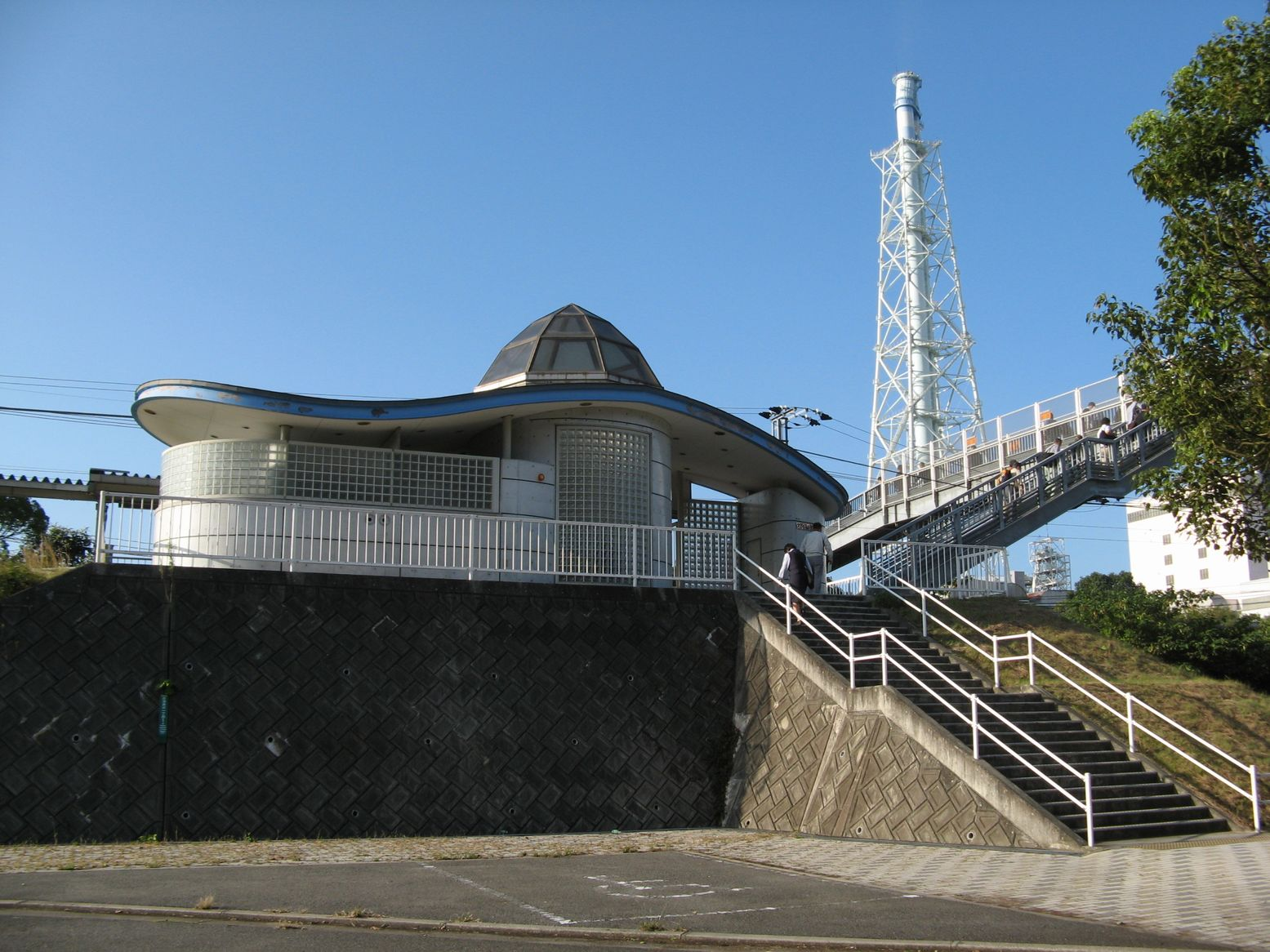
- Akinagahama Station, 2007

General information
- Location: 1-chome, Tadanoumi Nagahama, Takehara-shi, Hiroshima-ken; Japan
- Coordinates: 34°20′16.50″N 132°57′43.25″E
- Owner: West Japan Railway Company
- Operator: West Japan Railway Company
- Line: Y Kure Line
- Distance: 20.0 km (12.4 miles) from Mihara
- Platforms: 1 side platform
- Tracks: 1
- Connections: Bus stop

Construction
- Structure type: Ground level
- Accessible: Yes

Other information
- Status: Unstaffed
- Station code: JR-Y27
- Website: Official website

History
- Opened: 28 April 1931

Passengers
- FY2019: 280

Services
Preceding station	JR West	Following station
Ōnori towards Hiroshima	Kure Line Local	Tadanoumi towards Mihara
Location
- Location within Hiroshima Prefecture Location within Japan

Akinagahama Station (安芸長浜駅, Akinagahama-eki) is a passenger railway station located in the city of Takehara, Hiroshima Prefecture, Japan. It is operated by the West Japan Railway Company (JR West).

== Lines ==
Akinagahama Station is served by the JR West Kure Line, and is located 20.0 kilometers from the terminus of the line at Mihara.

== Station layout ==
The station consists of one side platform serving single bi-directional track. The station is unattended.

== History ==
Akinagahama Station opened on 1 October 1994.

== Passenger statistics ==
In fiscal 2019, the station was used by an average of 280 passengers daily.

== Surrounding area ==
- Japan National Route 185
- Takehara Thermal Power Station - It is directly connected to the station by an overpass

== See also ==
- List of railway stations in Japan
