= Y12 =

Y12 may refer to:

== Train stations ==
- Edogawabashi Station, in Bunkyō, Tokyo, Japan
- Higobashi Station, in Nishi-ku, Osaka, Japan
- Tadotsu Station, in Kagawa, Japan
- Yoshiura Station, in Kure, Hiroshima, Japan
- Zhonghe metro station, in Taipei, Taiwan

== Other uses ==
- Harbin Y-12, a Chinese aircraft
- Y-12 National Security Complex, an American nuclear weapon facility
  - Y-12 Project, a uranium enrichment project
