= Ōnori Station =

Railway station in Takehara, Hiroshima Prefecture, Japan

Ōnori Station 大乗駅
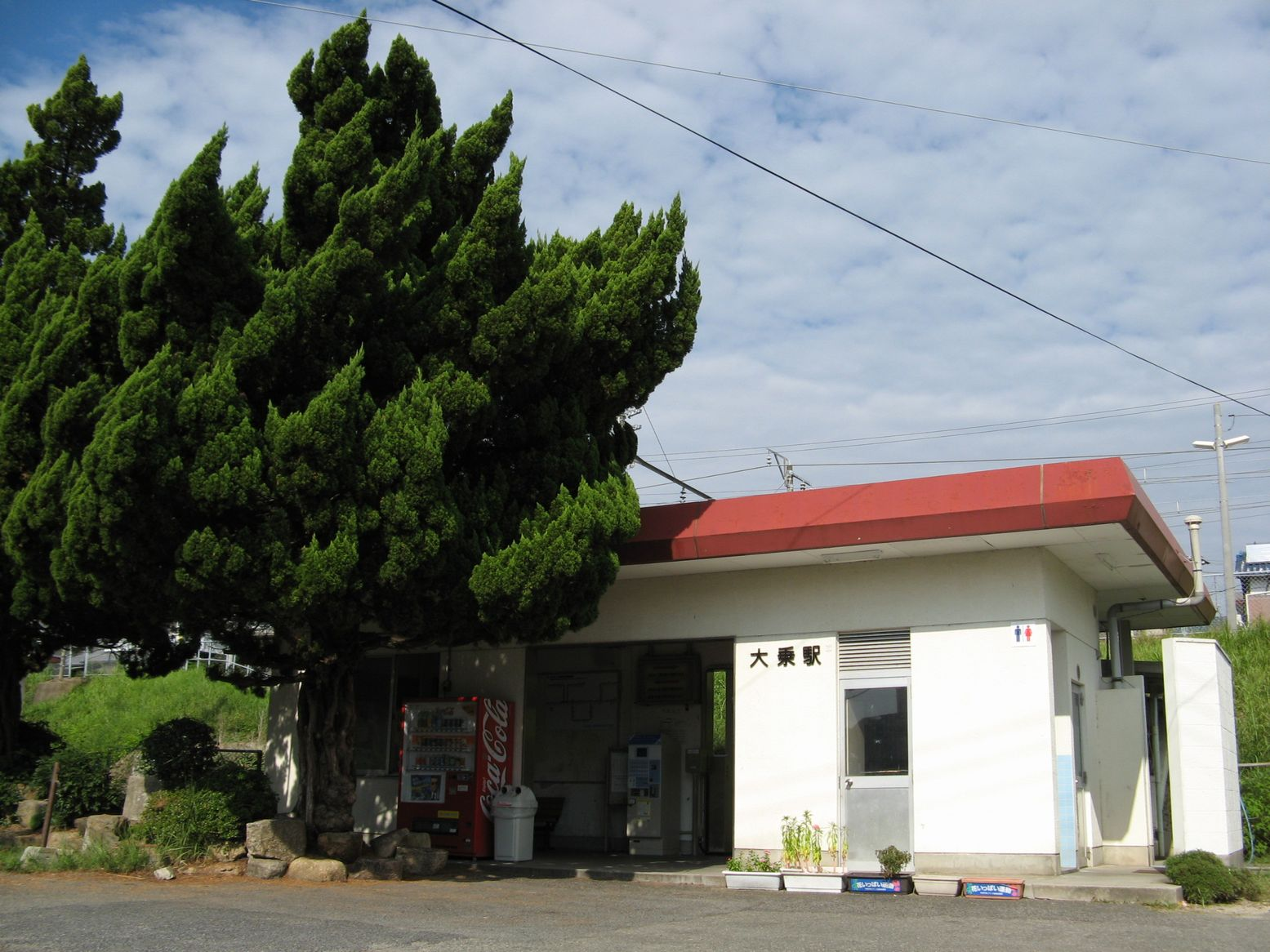
- Ōnori Station, 2007

General information
- Location: 353 Takasaki-cho, Takehara-shi, Hiroshima-ken 729-2313; Japan
- Coordinates: 34°20′26.18″N 132°56′43.67″E
- Owner: West Japan Railway Company
- Operator: West Japan Railway Company
- Line: Y Kure Line
- Distance: 21.8 km (13.5 miles) from Mihara
- Platforms: 2 side platforms
- Tracks: 2
- Connections: Bus stop

Construction
- Structure type: Ground level
- Accessible: Yes

Other information
- Status: Unstaffed
- Station code: JR-Y26
- Website: Official website

History
- Opened: 10 July 1932

Passengers
- FY2019: 127

Services
Preceding station	JR West	Following station
Takehara towards Hiroshima	Kure Line Local	Akinagahama towards Mihara
Location
- Location within Hiroshima Prefecture Location within Japan

Ōnori Station (大乗駅, Ōnori-eki) is a passenger railway station located in the city of Takehara, Hiroshima Prefecture, Japan. It is operated by the West Japan Railway Company (JR West).

== Lines ==
Ōnori Station is served by the JR West Kure Line, and is located 21.8 kilometers from the terminus of the line at Mihara.

== Station layout ==
The station consists of two opposed unnumbered ground-level side platforms connected by a level crossing. The station is unattended.

== Platforms ==
1	■ Y Kure Line	for Mihara and Fukuyama
2	■ Y Kure Line	for Takehara and Kure

== History ==
Ōnori Station was opened on 10 July 1932. With the privatization of the Japanese National Railways (JNR) on 1 April 1987, the station came under the control of JR West.

== Passenger statistics ==
In fiscal 2019, the station was used by an average of 127 passengers daily.

== Surrounding area ==
- Japan National Route 185
- Takehara City Daijo Elementary School

== See also ==
- List of railway stations in Japan
