= Akitsu Station =

Akitsu Station can refer to two different train stations in Japan:

- Akitsu Station (Tokyo) (秋津駅), on the Seibu Ikebukuro Line located in Higashimurayama, Tokyo, Japan
- Akitsu Station (Hiroshima) (安芸津駅), on the Kure Line located in Higashihiroshima, Hiroshima, Japan
