= Y16 =

Y16 may refer to:

== Train stations ==
- Banqiao station, in Taipei, Taiwan
- Daikokuchō Station, in Naniwa-ku, Osaka, Japan
- Nagatachō Station, in Chiyoda, Tokyo, Japan
- Shin-Hiro Station, in Kure, Hiroshima, Japan
- Takase Station (Kagawa), in Japan

== Other uses ==
- Y-16 Salon Advanced Landing Ground, now Salon-de-Provence Air Base in France
- Youth Bandy World Championship Y16
