= Y13 =

Y13 may refer to:

- Hommachi Station, in Chūō-ku, Osaka, Japan
- Iidabashi Station, in Chiyoda, Tokyo, Japan
- Kaiganji Station, in Kagawa, Japan
- Kawaraishi Station, in Kure, Hiroshima, Japan
- Qiaohe metro station, in Taipei, Taiwan
