= Y15 =

Y15 may refer to:

== Train stations ==
- Akiaga Station, in Kure, Hiroshima, Japan
- Banxin metro station, in Taipei, Taiwan
- Kōjimachi Station, in Chiyoda, Tokyo, Japan
- Mino Station, in Mitoyo, Kagawa, Japan
- Namba Station, in Chūō-ku, Osaka, Japan

== Other uses ==
- Greek submarine Argonaftis (Υ15), with a Greek letter upsilon
- Y-15 Aix/Les Milles Advanced Landing Ground, now Aix-en-Provence Aerodrome in France
- Youth Bandy World Championship Y15, for boys' teams up to age 15
- Y15, 1,2,4,5-benzenetetraamine tetrahydrochloride, an FAK inhibitor intended for cancer
