= Akisaizaki Station =

Railway station in Mihara, Hiroshima Prefecture, Japan

Akisaizaki Station 安芸幸崎駅
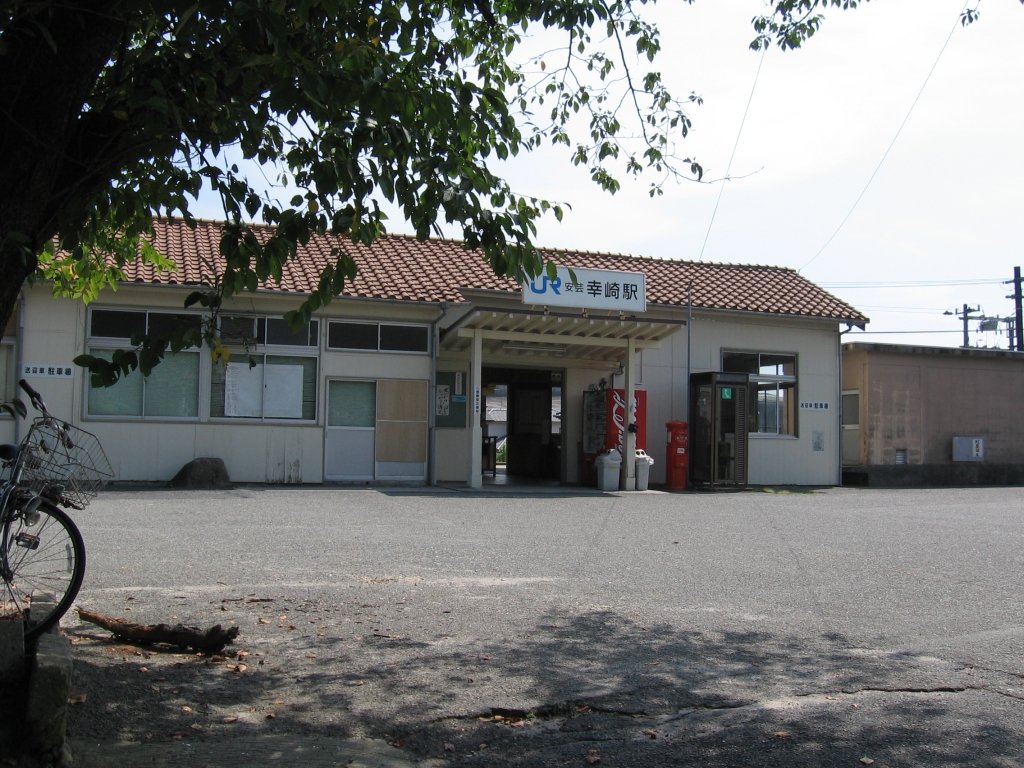
- Akisaizaki Station, August 2005

General information
- Location: 3-chōme-4 Saizakinōji, Mihara-shi, Hiroshima-ken 729-2252; Japan
- Coordinates: 34°20′17.41″N 133°2′23.62″E
- Owner: West Japan Railway Company
- Operator: West Japan Railway Company
- Line: Y Kure Line
- Distance: 11.8 km (7.3 miles) from Mihara
- Platforms: 2 side platforms
- Tracks: 2
- Connections: Bus stop

Construction
- Structure type: Ground level
- Accessible: Yes

Other information
- Status: Unstaffed
- Station code: JR-Y29
- Website: Official website

History
- Opened: 28 April 1931

Passengers
- FY2019: 226

Services
Preceding station	JR West	Following station
Tadanoumi towards Hiroshima	Kure Line Local	Sunami towards Mihara
Location
- Location within Hiroshima Prefecture Location within Japan

Akisaizaki Station (安芸幸崎駅, Akisaizaki-eki) is a passenger railway station located in the city of Mihara, Hiroshima Prefecture, Japan. It is operated by the West Japan Railway Company (JR West).

== Lines ==
Akisaizaki Station is served by the JR West Kure Line, and is located 11.8 kilometers from the terminus of the line at Mihara.

== Station layout ==
The station consists of two opposed ground-level side platforms connected by a footbridge. The station is unattended.

== Platforms ==
1	■ Y Kure Line	for Mihara and Fukuyama
2	■ Y Kure Line	for Takehara and Kure

== History ==
Akisaizaki Station was opened on 28 April 1931. With the privatization of the Japanese National Railways (JNR) on 1 April 1987, the station came under the control of JR West.

== Passenger statistics ==
In fiscal 2019, the station was used by an average of 226 passengers daily.

== Surrounding area ==
- Imabari Shipbuilding Hiroshima Factory (former Koyo Dock)
- Mihara Municipal Kouzaki Junior High School
- Mihara Municipal Kozaki Elementary School
- Japan National Route 185

== See also ==
- List of railway stations in Japan
