= Yasuura Station =

Railway station in Kure, Hiroshima Prefecture, Japan

Yasuura Station 安浦駅
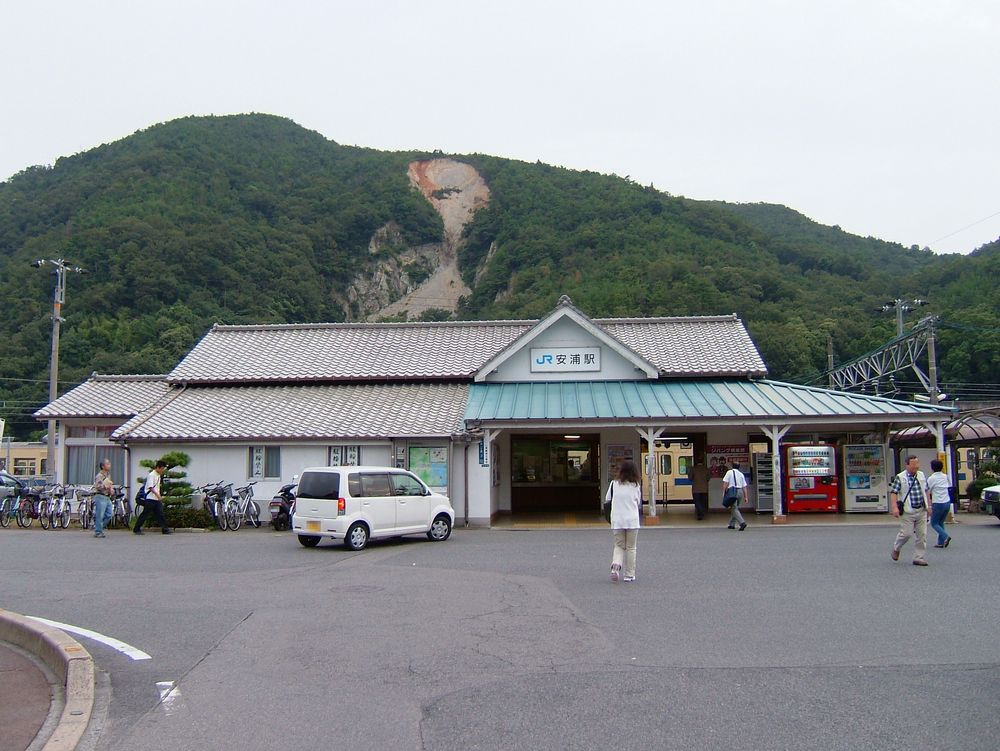
- Yasuura Station, August 2006

General information
- Location: 1-chōme-3 Yasuurachō Chūō, Kure-shi, Hiroshima-ken 737-2516; Japan
- Coordinates: 34°17′1.78″N 132°44′40.98″E
- Owner: West Japan Railway Company
- Operator: West Japan Railway Company
- Line: Y Kure Line
- Distance: 44.2 km (27.5 miles) from Mihara
- Platforms: 1 side + 1 island platform
- Tracks: 3
- Connections: Bus stop

Construction
- Structure type: Ground level
- Cycle facilities: Yes
- Accessible: No

Other information
- Status: Unstaffed
- Station code: JR-Y21
- Website: Official website

History
- Opened: 17 February 1935
- Former names: Mitsuuchinoumi (to 1946)

Passengers
- FY2019: 589

Services
Preceding station	JR West	Following station
Ato towards Hiroshima	Kure Line Local	Kazahaya towards Mihara
Location
- Location within Hiroshima Prefecture Location within Japan

Yasuura Station (安浦駅, Yasuura-eki) is a passenger railway station located in the city of Kure, Hiroshima Prefecture, Japan. It is operated by the West Japan Railway Company (JR West).

== Lines ==
Yasuura Station is served by the JR West Kure Line, and is located 44.2 kilometers from the terminus of the line at Mihara.

== Station layout ==
The station consists of one side platform and one island platform connected by a footbridge. The station is unattended.

== Platforms ==
1	■ Y Kure Line	for Takehara and Mihara
2, 3	■ Y Kure Line	for Kure and Hiroshima

== History ==
Yasuura Station was opened on 17 February 1935 as Mitsuuchinoumi Station (三津内海駅). It was renamed on 1 May 1946. With the privatization of the Japanese National Railways (JNR) on 1 April 1987, the station came under the control of JR West.

== Passenger statistics ==
In fiscal 2019, the station was used by an average of 589 passengers daily.

== Surrounding area ==
- Kure City Hall Yasuura Civic Center (Branch)
- Kure Municipal Yasuura Junior High School
- Japan National Route 185

== See also ==
- List of railway stations in Japan
