= Yoshina Station =

Railway station in Takehara, Hiroshima Prefecture, Japan

Yoshina Station 吉名駅
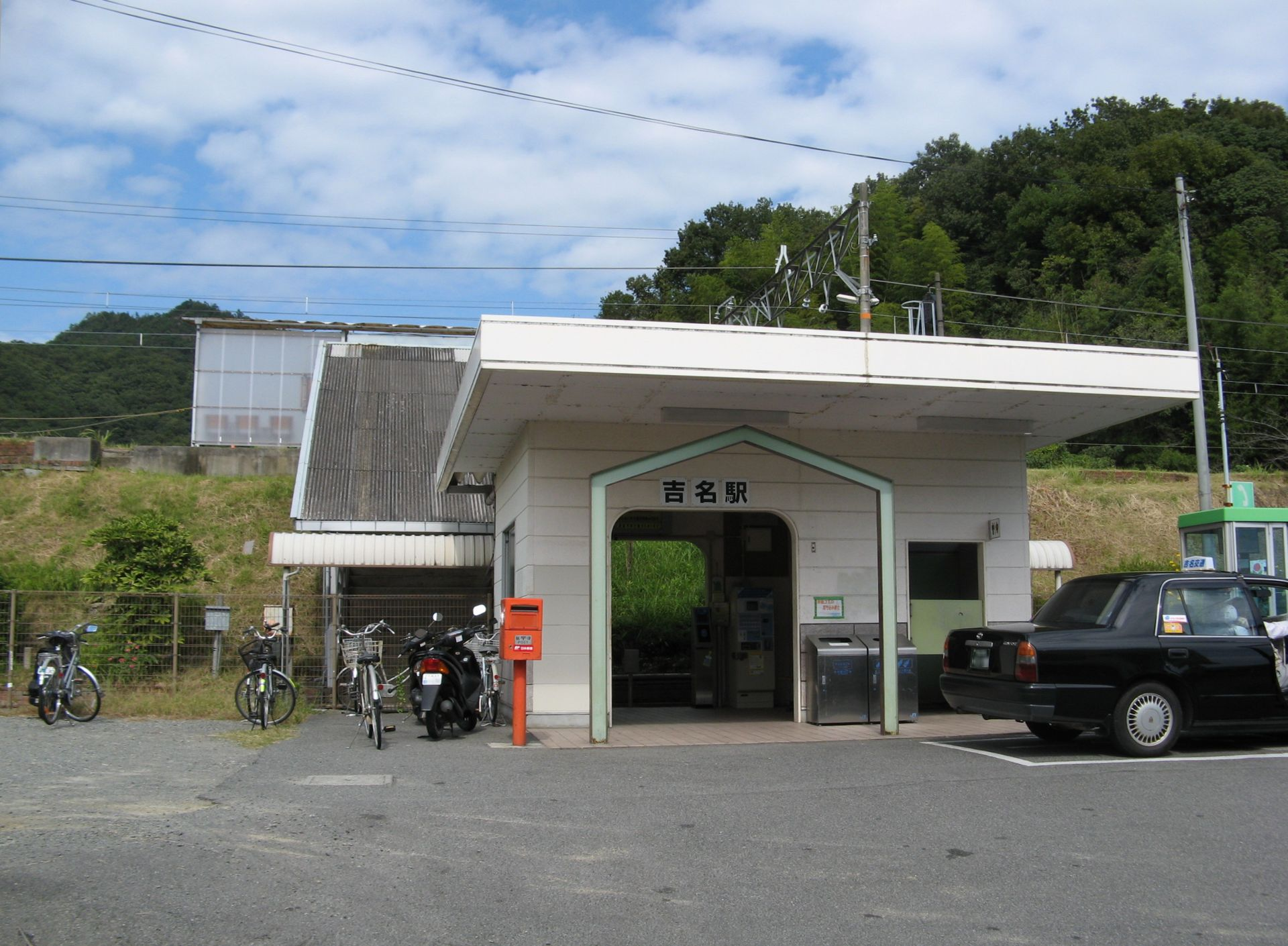
- Yoshina Station, 2007

General information
- Location: Yoshina-chō, Takehara-shi, Hiroshima-ken 725-0013; Japan
- Coordinates: 34°19′14.22″N 132°51′58.23″E
- Owner: West Japan Railway Company
- Operator: West Japan Railway Company
- Line: Y Kure Line
- Distance: 30.0 km (18.6 miles) from Mihara
- Platforms: 2 side platforms
- Tracks: 2
- Connections: Bus stop

Construction
- Structure type: Embankment
- Accessible: No

Other information
- Status: Unstaffed
- Station code: JR-Y24
- Website: Official website

History
- Opened: 17 February 1935

Passengers
- FY2019: 113

Services
Preceding station	JR West	Following station
Akitsu towards Hiroshima	Kure Line Local	Takehara towards Mihara
Location
- Location within Hiroshima Prefecture Location within Japan

Yoshina Station (吉名駅, Yoshina-eki) is a passenger railway station located in the city of Takehara, Hiroshima Prefecture, Japan. It is operated by the West Japan Railway Company (JR West).

== Lines ==
Yoshina Station is served by the JR West Kure Line, and is located 30.0 kilometers from the terminus of the line at Mihara.

== Station layout ==
The station consists of two opposed unnumbered side platforms connected by a level crossing. The track runs on the embankment, and the platforms are reached by stairs. The station is unattended.

== Platforms ==
Opposite side (1)	■ Y Kure Line	for Mihara and Fukuyama
Station side (2)	■ Y Kure Line	for Kure and Hiroshima

== History ==
Yoshina Station was opened on 27 February 1935. With the privatization of the Japanese National Railways (JNR) on 1 April 1987, the station came under the control of JR West.

== Passenger statistics ==
In fiscal 2019, the station was used by an average of 113 passengers daily.

== Surrounding area ==
- Japan National Route 185
- Takehara City Hall Yoshina Branch
- Takehara Municipal Yoshina Academy

== See also ==
- List of railway stations in Japan
