= Y19 =

Y19 may refer to:

== Train stations ==
- Akikawajiri Station, in Kure, Hiroshima, Japan
- Ginza-itchōme Station, in Chiyoda, Tokyo, Japan
- Kan'onji Station, Kan'onji, Kagawa, Japan
- Tamade Station (Osaka), in Nishinari-ku, Osaka, Japan
- Umeyashiki Station (Nara), in Ikoma, Nara Prefecture, Japan
- Xingfu metro station, in Taipei, Taiwan

== Other uses ==
- Bandy World Championship Y-19
