= Tadanoumi Station =

Railway station in Takehara, Hiroshima Prefecture, Japan

Tadanoumi Station 忠海駅
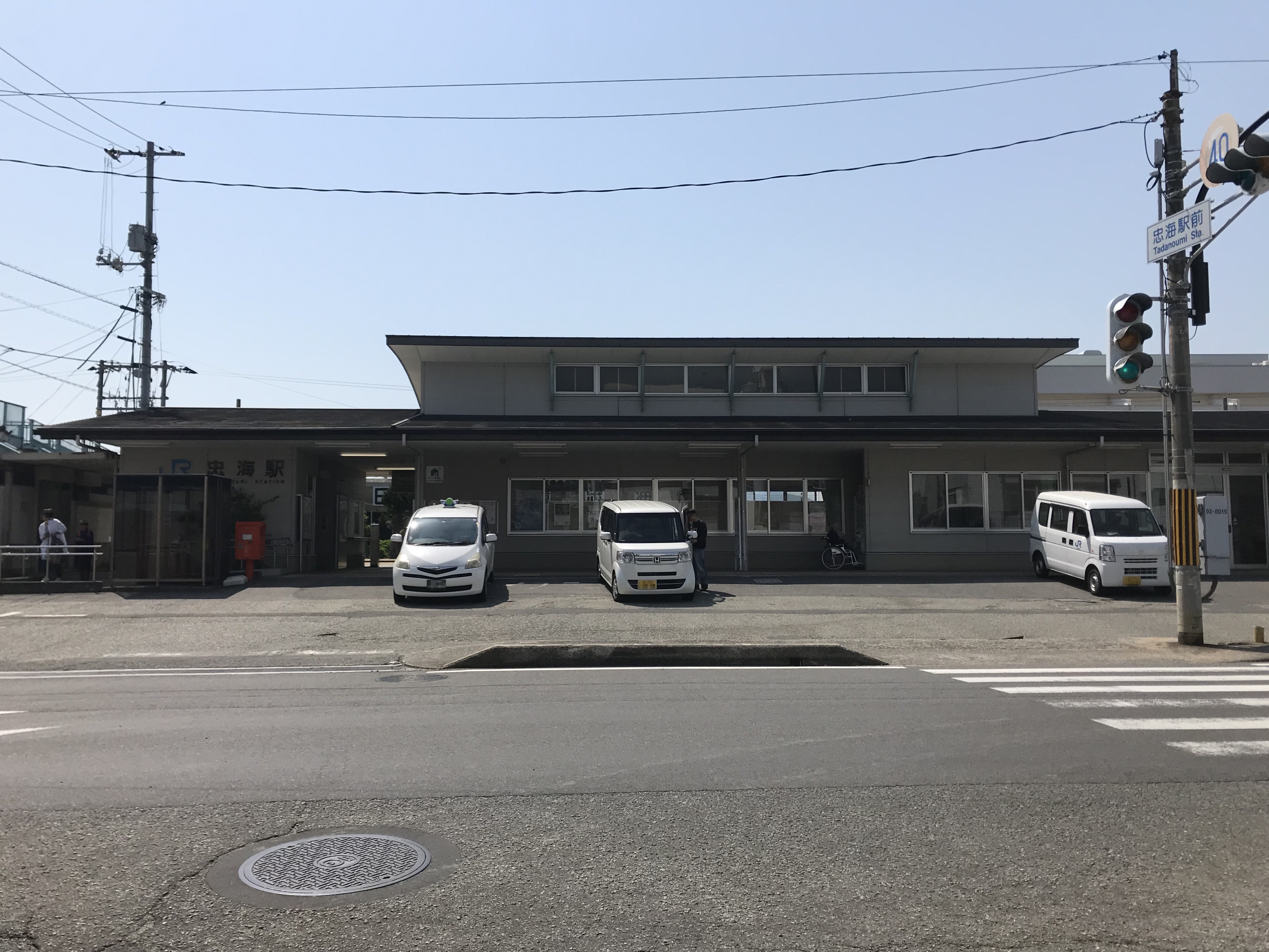
- Tadanoumi Station, 2018

General information
- Location: 1-chōme-1 Tadanoumi Nakamachi, Takehara-shi, Hiroshima-ken 729-2316; Japan
- Coordinates: 34°20′12.83″N 132°59′28.52″E
- Owner: West Japan Railway Company
- Operator: West Japan Railway Company
- Line: Y Kure Line
- Distance: 17.2 km (10.7 miles) from Mihara
- Platforms: 2 side platforms
- Tracks: 2
- Connections: Bus stop

Construction
- Structure type: Ground level
- Accessible: Yes

Other information
- Status: Unstaffed
- Station code: JR-Y28
- Website: Official website

History
- Opened: 28 April 1931

Passengers
- FY2019: 486

Services
Preceding station	JR West	Following station
Akinagahama towards Hiroshima	Kure Line Local	Akisaizaki towards Mihara
Location
- Location within Hiroshima Prefecture Location within Japan

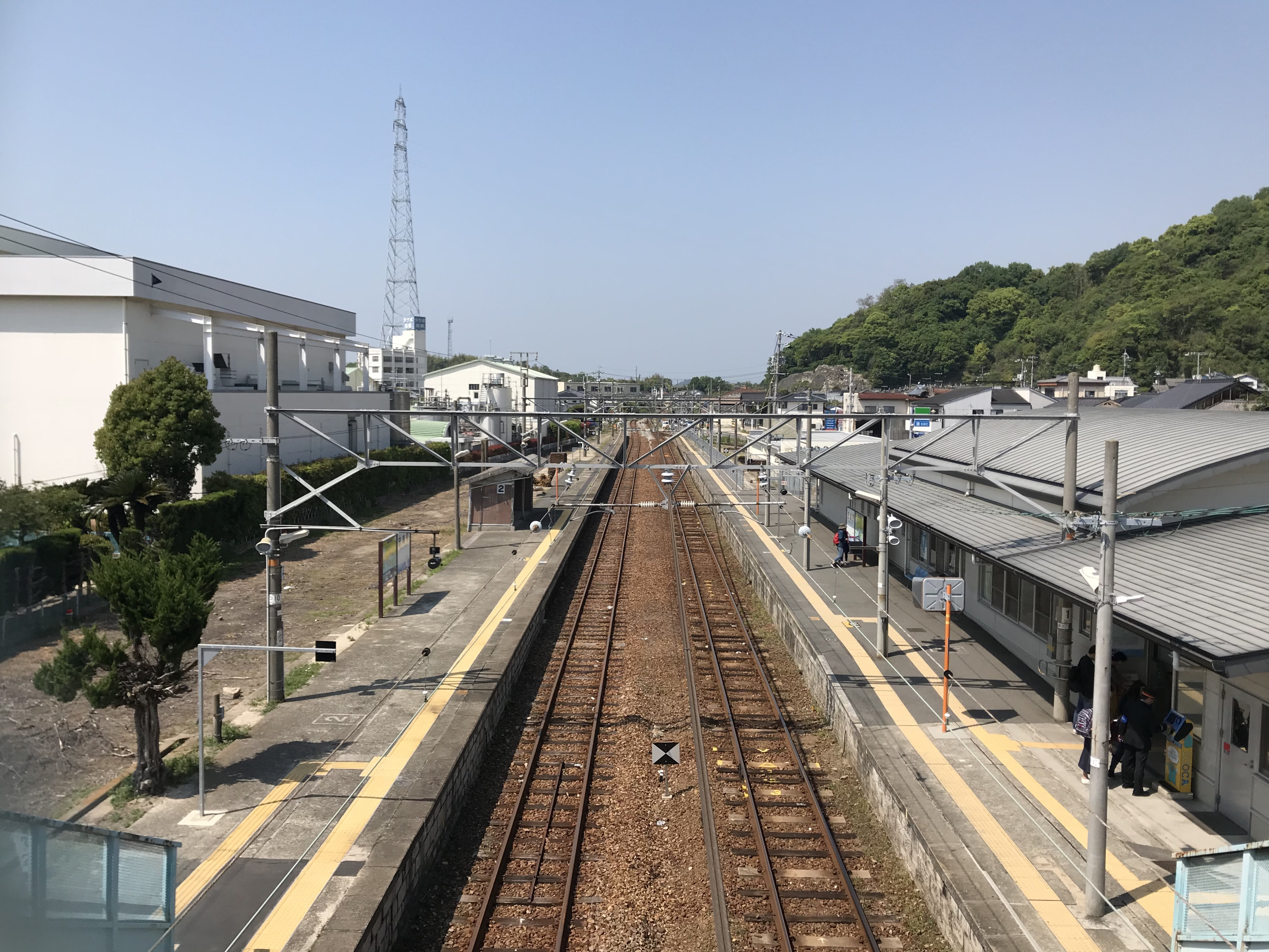
View from overpass

Tadanoumi Station (忠海駅, Tadanoumi-eki) is a passenger railway station located in the city of Takehara, Hiroshima Prefecture, Japan. It is operated by the West Japan Railway Company (JR West).

== Lines ==
Tadanoumi Station is served by the JR West Kure Line, and is located 17.2 kilometers from the terminus of the line at Mihara.

== Station layout ==
The station consists of two opposed ground-level side platforms connected by a footbridge. The station is unattended.

== Platforms ==
1	■ Y Kure Line	for Mihara and Fukuyama
2	■ Y Kure Line	for Takehara and Kure

== History ==
Tadanoumi Station was opened on 10 July 1932. With the privatization of the Japanese National Railways (JNR) on 1 April 1987, the station came under the control of JR West. It was a kan'i itaku station managed by the Mihara Regional Railway Department and an NPO corporation "Welfare Station Tadanoumi". Tickets were sold with a POS terminal until 2003, when a Midori no Madoguchi was set up at the outsourcing station, and tickets were sold with MARS. The station is currently unattended.

== Passenger statistics ==
In fiscal 2019, the station was used by an average of 496 passengers daily.

== Surrounding area ==
- Japan National Route 185
- Tadanoumi Port
- Okunoshima
- Aohata Jam Head Office
- Takehara City Hall Tadanoumi Branch

== See also ==
- List of railway stations in Japan
