= Y22 =

Y22 may refer to:

- Kawanoe Station, in Shikokuchūō, Ehime, Japan
- Minami-Shimizusawa Station, in Yūbari, Hokkaidō, Japan
- Toyosu Station, in Kōtō, Tokyo, Japan
- Kazahaya Station, in Higashihiroshima, Hiroshima, Japan
