= Sunami Station =

Railway station in Mihara, Hiroshima Prefecture, Japan

Sunami Station 須波駅
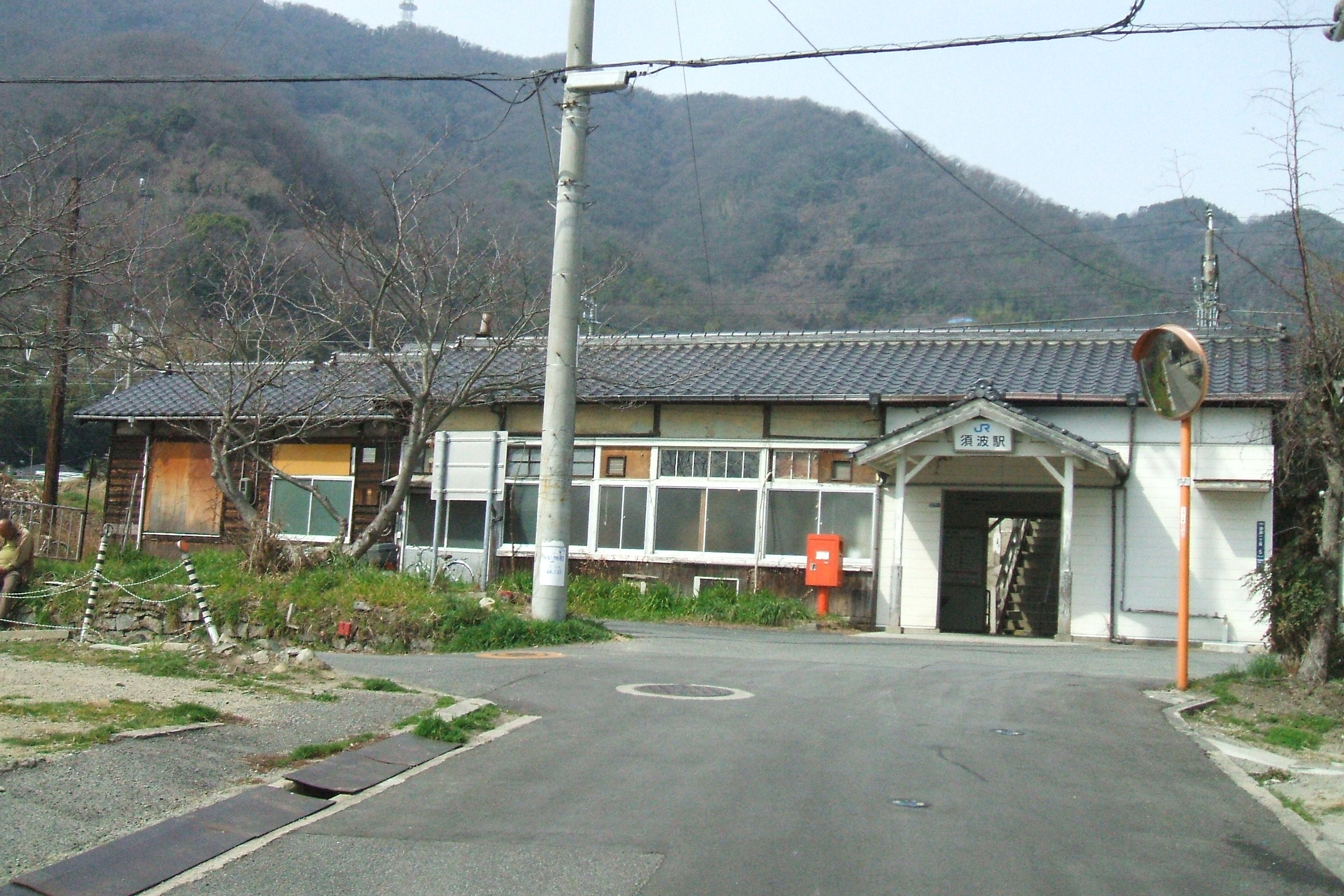
- Sunami Station, February 2010

General information
- Location: 1-chōme-5 Sunami, Mihara-shi, Hiroshima-ken 723-0031; Japan
- Coordinates: 34°22′12.23″N 133°5′2.23″E
- Owner: West Japan Railway Company
- Operator: West Japan Railway Company
- Line: Y Kure Line
- Distance: 5.1 km (3.2 miles) from Mihara
- Platforms: 2 side platforms
- Tracks: 2
- Connections: Bus stop

Construction
- Structure type: Ground level
- Accessible: Yes

Other information
- Status: Unstaffed
- Station code: JR-Y30
- Website: Official website

History
- Opened: 15 March 1930

Passengers
- FY2019: 80

Services
Preceding station	JR West	Following station
Akisaizaki towards Hiroshima	Kure Line Local	Mihara Terminus
Location
- Location within Hiroshima Prefecture Location within Japan

Sunami Station (須波駅, Sunami-eki) is a passenger railway station located in the city of Mihara, Hiroshima Prefecture, Japan. It is operated by the West Japan Railway Company (JR West).

== Lines ==
Sunami Station is served by the JR West Kure Line, and is located 5.1 kilometers from the terminus of the line at Mihara.

== Station layout ==
The station consists of two opposed side platforms connected by a level crossing. The platforms on an embankment, and the entrance and exit of each platform is provided independently. The station is unattended.

== Platforms ==
1	■ Y Kure Line	for Mihara and Fukuyama
2	■ Y Kure Line	for Takehara and Kure

== History ==
Sunami Station was opened on 19 March 1930. With the privatization of the Japanese National Railways (JNR) on 1 April 1987, the station came under the control of JR West. The current station building was built in 1990.

== Passenger statistics ==
In fiscal 2019, the station was used by an average of 80 passengers daily.

== Surrounding area ==
- Mihara Municipal Sunami Elementary School
- Japan National Route 185

== See also ==
- List of railway stations in Japan
