= Kure-Portopia Station =

Railway station in Kure, Hiroshima Prefecture, Japan

Kure-Portopia Station 呉ポートピア駅
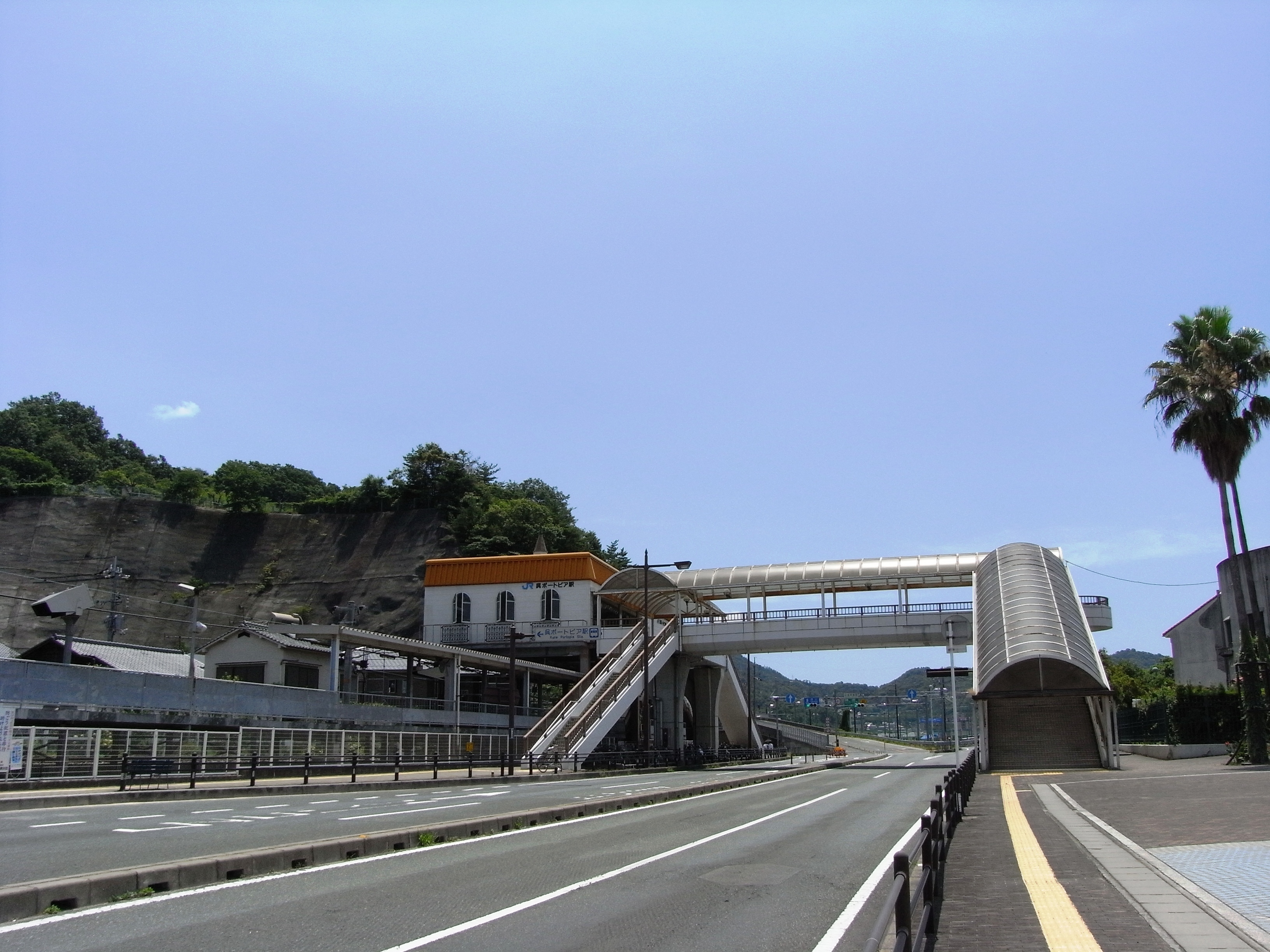
- Kure-Portopia Station in July 2008

General information
- Location: 1-23 Tennōden Juhara-chō, Kure-shi, Hiroshima-ken; Japan
- Coordinates: 34°17′30.97″N 132°30′45.76″E
- Owner: West Japan Railway Company
- Operator: West Japan Railway Company
- Line: Y Kure Line
- Distance: 75.6 km (47.0 miles) from Mihara
- Platforms: 1 side platform
- Tracks: 1
- Connections: Bus stop

Construction
- Structure type: Ground level
- Cycle facilities: Yes

Other information
- Status: Unstaffed
- Station code: JR-Y09
- Website: Official website

History
- Opened: 19 March 1992

Passengers
- FY2019: 853

Services
Preceding station	JR West	Following station
Koyaura towards Hiroshima	Kure Line Local	Tennō towards Mihara
Location
- Location within Hiroshima Prefecture Location within Japan

Kure-Portopia Station (呉ポートピア駅, Kure-Pōtopia-eki) is a passenger railway station located in the city of Kure, Hiroshima Prefecture, Japan. It is operated by the West Japan Railway Company (JR West).

== Lines ==
Kure-Portopia Station is served by the JR West Kure Line, and is located 75.6 kilometers from the terminus of the line at Mihara.

== Station layout ==
The station consists of one side platform serving a single bi-directional track, with an elevated station building. The station is unattended.

== History ==
Kure-Portopia station opened on 19 March 1992.

== Passenger statistics ==
In fiscal 2019, the station was used by an average of 853 passengers daily.

== Surrounding area ==
- Kure Portopia Park (park)
- Japan National Route 31
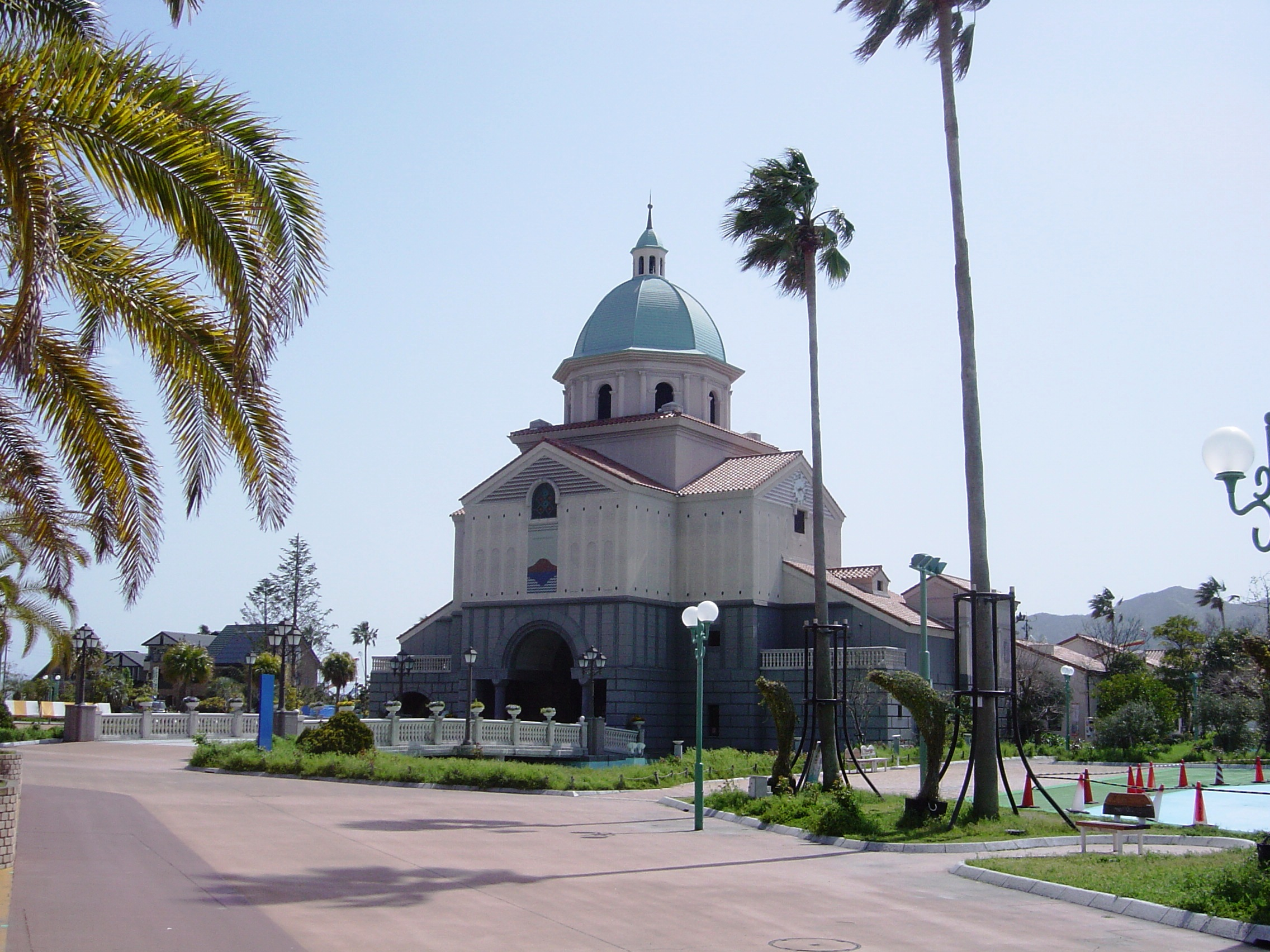
Kure-Portopia Park

== See also ==
- List of railway stations in Japan
