= Mizushiri Station =

Railway station in Saka, Hiroshima Prefecture, Japan

Mizushiri Station 水尻駅
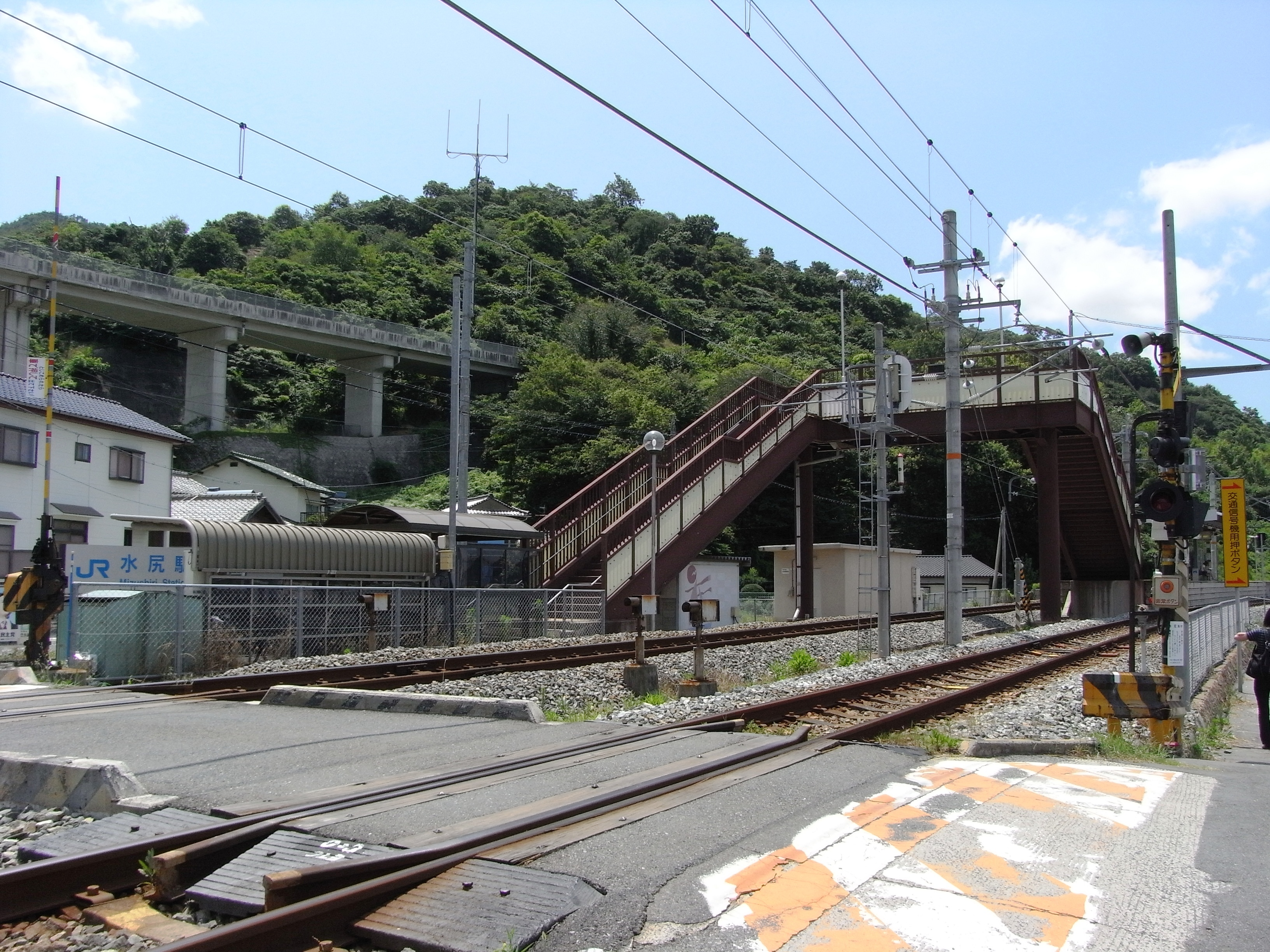
- Mizushiri Station in July 2008

General information
- Location: 1-chōme-2 Koyaura, Saka-cho, Aki-gun, Hiroshima-ken 731-4331; Japan
- Coordinates: 34°19′11.97″N 132°29′56.39″E
- Owner: West Japan Railway Company
- Operator: West Japan Railway Company
- Line: Y Kure Line
- Distance: 79.3 km (49.3 miles) from Mihara
- Platforms: 1 island platform
- Tracks: 2
- Connections: Bus stop

Other information
- Status: Unstaffed
- Station code: JR-Y07
- Website: Official website

History
- Opened: 7 February 1999

Passengers
- FY2019: 69

Services
Preceding station	JR West	Following station
Saka towards Hiroshima	Kure Line Local	Koyaura towards Mihara
Location
- Location within Hiroshima Prefecture Location within Japan

Mizushiri Station (水尻駅, Mizushiri-eki) is a passenger railway station located in the town of Saka, Aki District, Hiroshima Prefecture, Japan. It is operated by the West Japan Railway Company (JR West).

== Lines ==
Mizushiri Station is served by the JR West Kure Line and is 79.3 kilometers from the terminus of that line at Mihara.

== Station layout ==
The station consists of one ground-level island platform connected by a footbridge to a simple station building with automatic ticket machines. The station is unattended.

== Platforms ==
1	■ Y Kure Line	for Kure and Takehara
2	■ Y Kure Line	for Kaitaichi and Hiroshima

== History ==
Mizushiri Station was opened on 7 February 1999.

== Passenger statistics ==
In fiscal 2019, the station was used by an average of 69 passengers daily.

== Surrounding area ==
The station building is sandwiched between the sea on the west side and the mountains on the east side, and there is little flat land. There is a sandy beach called Bayside Beach on the west side of the station.

== See also ==
- List of railway stations in Japan
