= Shin-Hiro Station =

Railway station in Kure, Hiroshima Prefecture, Japan

Shin-Hiro Station 新広駅
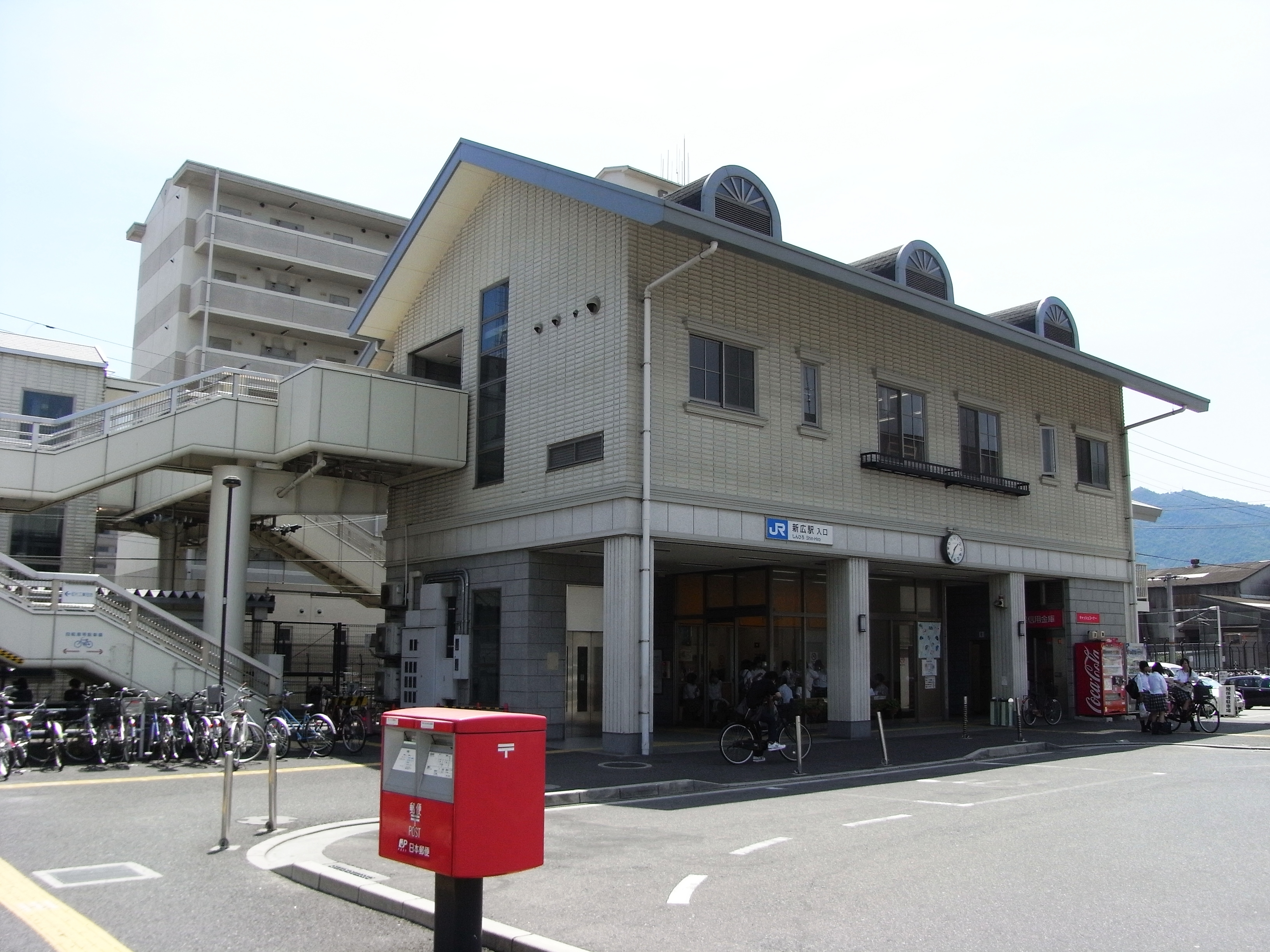
- Shin-Hiro Station, July 2008

General information
- Location: 2-1-9 Hiroko Shinkai,, Kure-shi, Hiroshima-ken; Japan
- Coordinates: 34°13′56.05″N 132°36′51.51″E
- Owner: West Japan Railway Company
- Operator: West Japan Railway Company
- Line: Y Kure Line
- Distance: 61.5 km (38.2 miles) from Mihara
- Platforms: 1 side platform
- Tracks: 1
- Connections: Bus stop

Construction
- Structure type: Ground level
- Cycle facilities: Yes
- Accessible: Yes

Other information
- Status: Unstaffed
- Station code: JR-Y16
- Website: Official website

History
- Opened: 23 March 2002

Passengers
- FY2019: 2776

Services
Preceding station	JR West	Following station
Akiaga towards Hiroshima	Kure Line Local	Hiro towards Mihara
Location
- Location within Hiroshima Prefecture Location within Japan

Shin-Hiro Station (新広駅, Shin-Hiro-eki) is a passenger railway station located in the city of Kure, Hiroshima Prefecture, Japan. It is operated by the West Japan Railway Company (JR West).

== Lines ==
Shin-Hiro Station is served by the JR West Kure Line, and is located 61.5 kilometers from the terminus of the line at Mihara.

== Station layout ==
The station consists of one side platform serving a single bi-directional track. The station is staffed.

== History ==
Shin-Hiro Station was opened on 23 March 2002.

== Passenger statistics ==
In fiscal 2019, the station was used by an average of 2776 passengers daily.

== Surrounding area ==
- Chugoku Industrial Hospital
- Japan National Route 185
- Kure City Hall Hiro Branch

== See also ==
- List of railway stations in Japan
