= Kure Line =

Railway line in Hiroshima prefecture, Japan

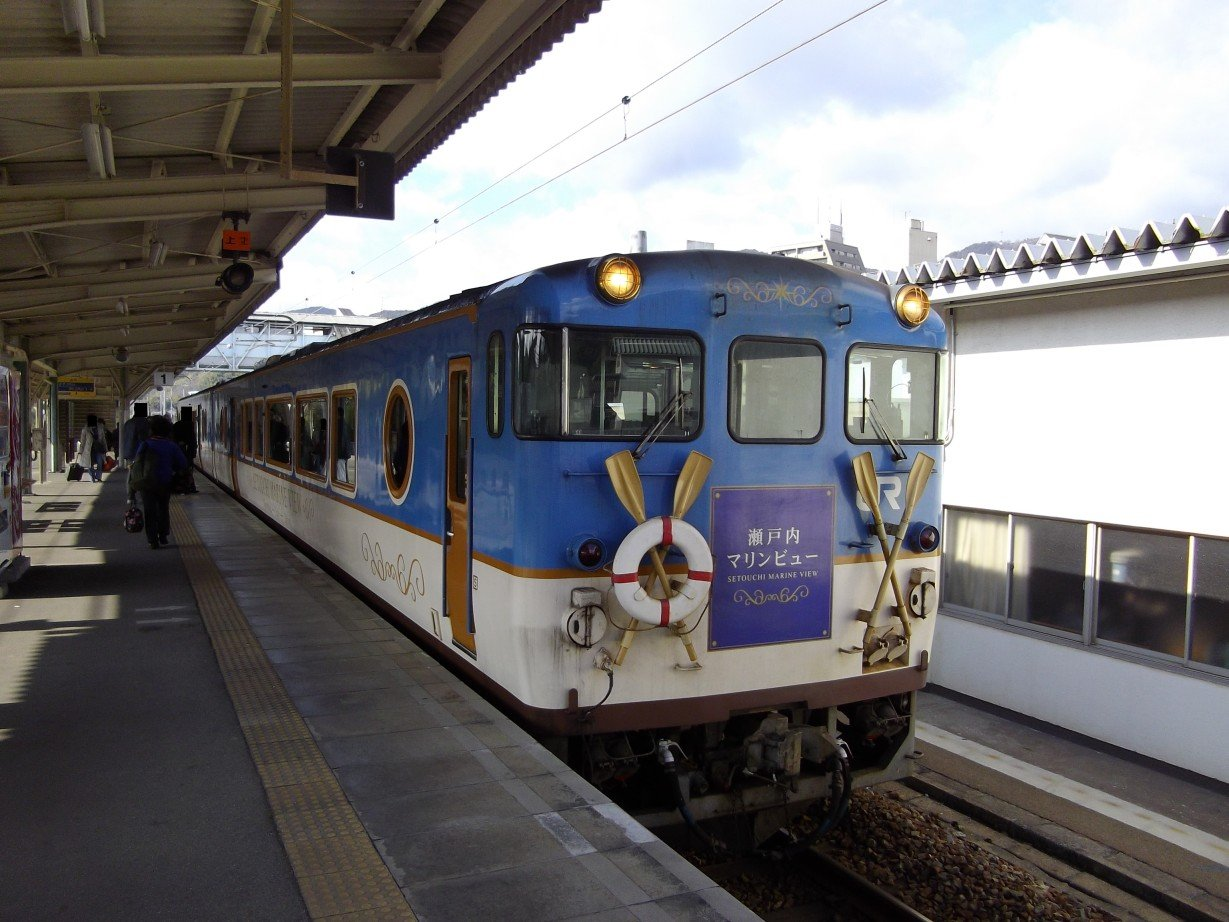
- The Setouchi Marine View tourist trainset

Overview
- Other name: Setouchi Sazanami Line (Mihara to Hiro)
- Native name: 呉線
- Owner: JR West
- Locale: Hiroshima Prefecture
- Termini: Mihara; Kaitaichi
- Stations: 28

History
- Opened: 27 December 1903; 122 years ago

Technical
- Line length: 87.0 km (54.1 mi)
- Track gauge: 1,067 mm (3 ft 6 in)
- Electrification: Overhead line, 1,500 V DC
- Operating speed: 95 km/h (59 mph)

The Kure Line (Japanese: 呉線, Hepburn: Kure-sen) is a railway line operated by West Japan Railway Company (JR West) within Hiroshima Prefecture in Japan. It begins at Mihara Station in Mihara and terminates at Kaitaichi Station in Kaita. It is one of the main lines of JR West. The section between Mihara Station and Hiro Station is branded the "Setouchi Sazanami Line" (Seto Inland Sea Ripple Line) as the sightseeing line. On the section between Mihara Station and Hiro Station, most trains operate from Hiro Station through Mihara Station to Itozaki Station. On the section between Hiro Station and Kaitaichi Station, most trains operate from Hiro Station through Kaitaichi Station to Hiroshima Station or Iwakuni Station.

== Special trains ==
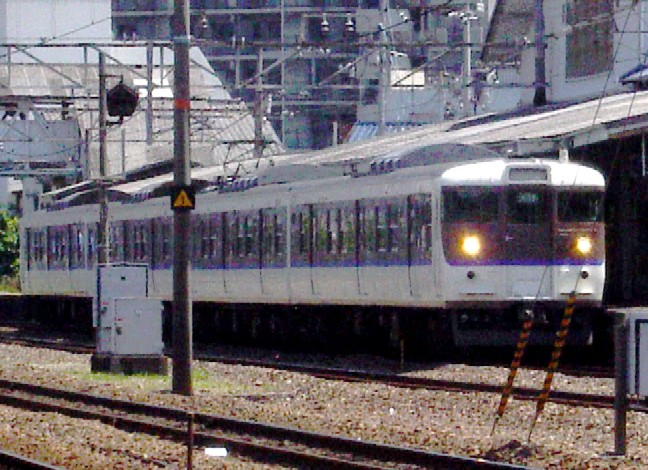
A 115 series train on an Akiji liner Rapid Service

- Akiji Liner: Runs the section between Hiroshima Station to Kure Station in about 30 minutes.
- etSETOra: Sightseeing train operated since October 1, 2005. Renamed from Setouchi Marine View in 2019.

== Stations ==
The Kure Line is entirely within Hiroshima Prefecture.

Line	No.	Station	Distance in km (mi)	Transfers	Location
Kure	Y 31	Mihara 三原	0 (0)	San'yō Shinkansen; G San'yō Main Line (G 16); X San'yō Main Line (X 20)	Mihara
Kure	Y 30	Sunami 須波	5.1 (3.2)		Mihara
Kure	Y 29	Akisaizaki 安芸幸崎	11.8 (7.3)		Mihara
Kure	Y 28	Tadanoumi 忠海	17.2 (10.7)		Takehara
Kure	Y 27	Akinagahama 安芸長浜	20.0 (12.4)		Takehara
Kure	Y 26	Ōnori 大乗	21.8 (13.5)		Takehara
Kure	Y 25	Takehara 竹原	25.3 (15.7)		Takehara
Kure	Y 24	Yoshina 吉名	30.0 (18.6)		Takehara
Kure	Y 23	Akitsu 安芸津	34.7 (21.6)		Higashihiroshima
Kure	Y 22	Kazahaya 風早	37.9 (23.5)		Higashihiroshima
Kure	Y 21	Yasuura 安浦	44.2 (27.5)		Kure
Kure	Y 20	Ato 安登	48.7 (30.3)		Kure
Kure	Y 19	Akikawajiri 安芸川尻	52.8 (32.8)		Kure
Kure	Y 18	Nigata 仁方	57.6 (35.8)		Kure
Kure	Y 17	Hiro 広	60.2 (37.4)		Kure
Kure	Y 16	Shin-Hiro 新広	61.5 (38.2)		Kure
Kure	Y 15	Akiaga 安芸阿賀	62.9 (39.1)		Kure
Kure	Y 14	Kure 呉	67.0 (41.6)		Kure
Kure	Y 13	Kawaraishi 川原石	68.7 (42.7)		Kure
Kure	Y 12	Yoshiura 吉浦	71.0 (44.1)		Kure
Kure	Y 11	Karugahama かるが浜	72.2 (44.9)		Kure
Kure	Y 10	Tennō 天応	74.3 (46.2)		Kure
Kure	Y 09	Kure-Portopia 呉ポートピア	75.6 (47.0)		Kure
Kure	Y 08	Koyaura 小屋浦	77.1 (47.9)		Saka, Aki District
Kure	Y 07	Mizushiri 水尻	79.3 (49.3)		Saka, Aki District
Kure	Y 06	Saka 坂	81.8 (50.8)		Saka, Aki District
Kure	Y 05	Yano 矢野	84.4 (52.4)		Aki-ku, Hiroshima
Kure	Y 04	Kaitaichi 海田市	87.0 (54.1)	G San'yō Main Line (G 04)	Kaita, Aki District
Sanyō	Y 04	Kaitaichi 海田市	87.0 (54.1)	G San'yō Main Line (G 04)	Kaita, Aki District
Sanyō	Y 03	Mukainada 向洋	89.3 (55.5)		Fuchū, Aki District
Sanyō	Y 02	Tenjingawa 天神川	91.1 (56.6)		Minami-ku, Hiroshima
Sanyō	Y 01	Hiroshima 広島	93.4 (58.0)	San'yō Shinkansen; B Kabe Line (B 01); G San'yō Main Line (G 01); P Geibi Line (P 01); R San'yō Main Line (R 01); 1 2 5 6 Hiroden Main Line (M01)	Minami-ku, Hiroshima

== Rolling stock ==
New 2- and 3-car 227 series electric trains are scheduled to be introduced on the Kure Line from around 2015, replacing older 115 series trains.

== History ==
The Kaitashi - Kure section was opened as a private line in 1903, and leased to the Sanyo Railway Co. the following year, before being nationalised in 1906. Individual section opening dates are given below.

The Mihara - Sunami section opened in 1930, and the two sections were connected in 1935. Work to duplicate the line at Kure commenced in 1940, but was abandoned due to material shortages in 1945.

The entire line was electrified in 1970, and freight services ceased in 1986.

=== Kure Line ===
- Opened the line between Kaitaichi Station to Kure Station including Yano Station, Saka Station, Tennō Station and Yoshiura Station on December 27, 1903.
- Opened temporary station (Hamasaki Station) on July 28, 1904.
- Rent for Sanyo Railway from December 1, 1904.
- Nationalized from December 1, 1906.
- Named "Kure Line" as one of national rail ways on October 12, 1909.
- Opened Koyaura Station and Closed Hamasaki Station on May 1, 1914.
- Opened temporary station (Akihamasaki Station) on July 21, 1926.
- Opened temporary station (Karyugahama Station) on July 7, 1928.
- Extended the line from Kure Station to Hiro Station and opened Akiaga Station and Hiro Station on March 24, 1935.

=== Sango Line ===
- Opened Sango Line between Mihara Station to Sunami Station on March 19, 1930.
- Extended the line from Sunami Station to Akisaizaki Station on April 28, 1931.
- Extended the line from Akisaizaki Station to Takehara Station including Tadanoumi Station and Ōnori Station on July 10, 1932.
- Extended the line from Takehara Station to Mitsuuchinoumi Station later renamed to Yasuura Station including Yoshina Station, Akimitsu Station and Kazahaya Station on January 17, 1935.

=== Integration ===
- Integrated Sango Line into Kure Line and opened Ato Station, Akikawajiri Station, Nigata Station and Kawaraishi Station on November 24, 1935.

=== After integration ===
- Closed Kawaraishi Station on December 1, 1940.
- Renamed Mitsuuchinoumi Station to Yasuura Station on May 1, 1946.
- Renamed Akimitsu Station to Akitsu Station on December 20, 1949.
- Re-opened Kawaraishi Station on August 1, 1958.
- Closed temporary stations (Karyugahama Station and Akihamasaki Station) on August 1, 1967.
- Electrified the rail way on September 15, 1970.
- Stopped cargo services on December 1, 1986.
- Privatized as JR West on April 1, 1987.
- Opened Kure-Portopia Station on March 19, 1992.
- Opened Akinagahama Station on October 1, 1994.
- Opened Karugahama Station and Mizushiri Station and moved Kawaraishi Station on February 7, 1999.
- Opened Shinhiro Station on March 23, 2002.
