= Koyaura Station =

Railway station in Saka, Hiroshima Prefecture, Japan

Koyaura Station 小屋浦駅
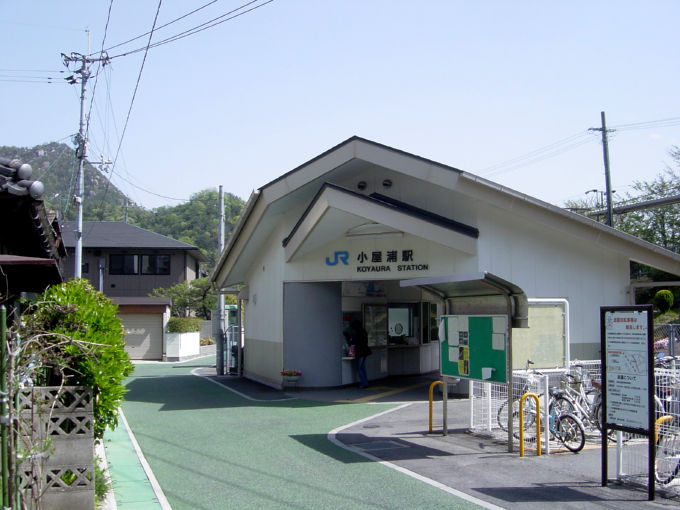
- Koyaura Station in July 2008

General information
- Location: 1-chōme-2 Koyaura, Saka-cho, Aki-gun, Hiroshima-ken 731-4331; Japan
- Coordinates: 34°18′8.99″N 132°30′22.87″E
- Owner: West Japan Railway Company
- Operator: West Japan Railway Company
- Line: Y Kure Line
- Distance: 77.1 km (47.9 miles) from Mihara
- Platforms: 2 side platforms
- Tracks: 2
- Connections: Bus stop

Other information
- Status: Unstaffed
- Station code: JR-Y08
- Website: Official website

History
- Opened: 1 May 1914

Passengers
- FY2019: 306

Services
Preceding station	JR West	Following station
Mizushiri towards Hiroshima	Kure Line Local	Kure-Portopia towards Mihara
Location
- Location within Hiroshima Prefecture Location within Japan

Koyaura Station (小屋浦駅, Koyaura-eki) is a passenger railway station located in the town of Saka, Aki District, Hiroshima Prefecture, Japan. It is operated by the West Japan Railway Company (JR West).

== Lines ==
Koyaura Station is served by the JR West Kure Line and is 77.1 kilometers from the terminus of that line at Mihara.

== Station layout ==
The station consists of two ground-level opposed side platforms connected by a footbridge. The station is unattended.

== Platforms ==
1	■ Y Kure Line	for Kure and Takehara
2	■ Y Kure Line	for Kaitaichi and Hiroshima

== History ==
Koyaura Station was opened on 1 May 1914.

== Passenger statistics ==
In fiscal 2019, the station was used by an average of 306 passengers daily.

== Surrounding area ==
- Tenchi River
- Japan National Route 31
- Saka Town Office Koyaura Branch Office (commonly known as Koyaura Fureai Center)
- Saka Municipal Koyaura Elementary School

== See also ==
- List of railway stations in Japan
