= Tennō Station (Hiroshima) =

Railway station in Kure, Hiroshima Prefecture, Japan

Tennō Station 天応駅
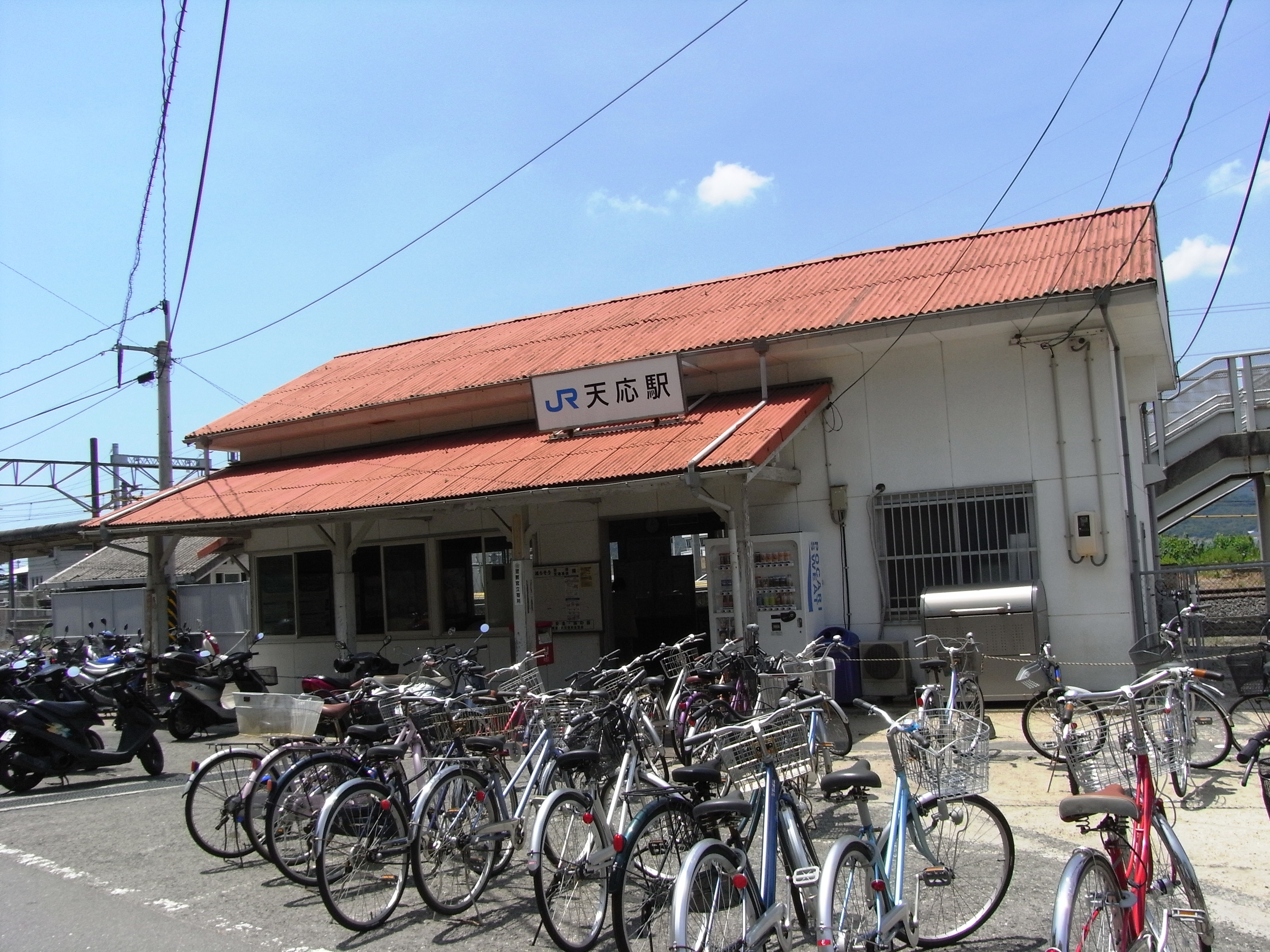
- Tennō Station in July, 2008

General information
- Location: 3 Tennōshioyachō, Kure-shi, Hiroshima-ken 737-0881; Japan
- Coordinates: 34°16′55.97″N 132°31′10.47″E
- Owner: West Japan Railway Company
- Operator: West Japan Railway Company
- Line: Y Kure Line
- Distance: 74.3 km (46.2 miles) from Mihara
- Platforms: 1 island platform
- Tracks: 2
- Connections: Bus stop

Construction
- Structure type: Ground level
- Cycle facilities: Yes

Other information
- Status: Unstaffed
- Station code: JR-Y10
- Website: Official website

History
- Opened: 27 December 1903

Passengers
- FY2019: 576

Services
Preceding station	JR West	Following station
Kure-Portopia towards Hiroshima	Kure Line Local	Karugahama towards Mihara
Location
- Location within Hiroshima Prefecture Location within Japan

Tennō Station (天応駅, Tennō-eki) is a passenger railway station located in the city of Kure, Hiroshima Prefecture, Japan. It is operated by the West Japan Railway Company (JR West).

== Lines ==
Tennō Station is served by the JR West Kure Line, and is located 74.3 kilometers from the terminus of the line at Mihara.

== Station layout ==
The station consists of one unnumbered island platform connected to the station building by a footbridge. The station is unattended.

== Platforms ==
station side	■ Y Kure Line	for Kure and Takehara
opposite side	■ Y Kure Line	for Kaitaichi and Hiroshima

== History ==
Tennō Station was opened on 27 December 1903. With the privatization of the Japanese National Railways (JNR) on 1 April 1987, the station came under the control of JR West.

== Passenger statistics ==
In fiscal 2019, the station was used by an average of 576 passengers daily.

== Surrounding area ==
- Kure City Hall Tenno Branch

== See also ==
- List of railway stations in Japan
