= Nigata Station =

Railway station in Kure, Hiroshima Prefecture, Japan

Nigata Station 仁方駅
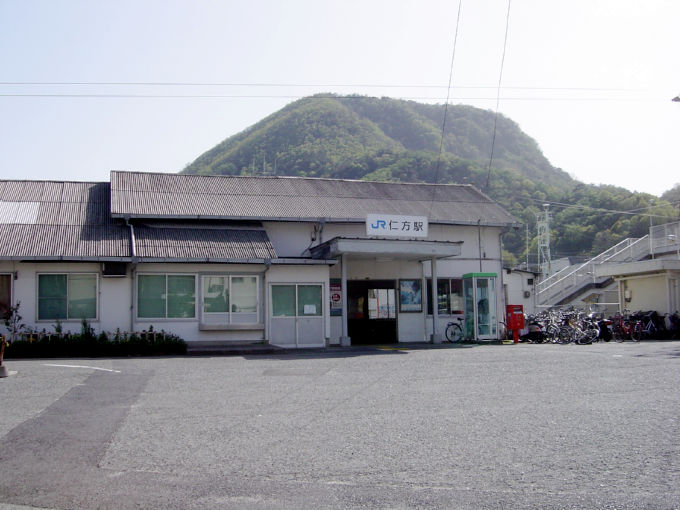
- Nigata Station, April 2005

General information
- Location: 2-chōme-1 Nigatahonmachi, Kure-shi, Hiroshima-ken 737-0152; Japan
- Coordinates: 34°13′18.38″N 132°39′19.48″E
- Owner: West Japan Railway Company
- Operator: West Japan Railway Company
- Line: Y Kure Line
- Distance: 57.6 km (35.8 miles) from Mihara
- Platforms: 2 side platforms
- Tracks: 2
- Connections: Bus stop

Construction
- Structure type: Ground level
- Cycle facilities: Yes
- Accessible: No

Other information
- Status: Unstaffed
- Station code: JR-Y18
- Website: Official website

History
- Opened: 24 November 1935

Passengers
- FY2019: 511

Services
Preceding station	JR West	Following station
Hiro towards Hiroshima	Kure Line Local	Akikawajiri towards Mihara
Location
- Location within Hiroshima Prefecture Location within Japan

Nigata Station (仁方駅, Nigata-eki) is a passenger railway station located in the city of Kure, Hiroshima Prefecture, Japan. It is operated by the West Japan Railway Company (JR West).

== Lines ==
Nigata Station is served by the JR West Kure Line, and is located 57.6 kilometers from the terminus of the line at Mihara.

== Station layout ==
The station consists of two opposed side platforms, which were formerly connected by a footbridge. However, due to deterioration, the footbridge was removed from 2018 to 2019 and currently the only means to change platforms is to exit the station building and cross via a pedestrian bridge outside the ticket gate, which was installed by Kure city before the footbridge was removed. The station is unattended.

== Platforms ==
1	■ Y Kure Line	for Takehara and Mihara
2	■ Y Kure Line	for Kure and Hiroshima

== History ==
Nigata Station was opened on 24 November 1935. From 1 May 1946, it was a connecting station for the Nihori Sea Route, which runs from nearby Nigata Port to Horie Station (Horie Pier) on the opposite shore of the Seto Inland Sea in Matsuyama, Ehime. After the ferry was abolished on 1 July 1982, the connection function was transferred to Akiaga Station (the port of call for the Kure-Matsuyama Ferry). With the privatization of the Japanese National Railways (JNR) on 1 April 1987, the station came under the control of JR West.

== Passenger statistics ==
In fiscal 2019, the station was used by an average of 511 passengers daily.

== Surrounding area ==
- Nigata Port
- Kure City Hall Nigata Civic Center (Branch)
- Kure Municipal Nigata Junior High School
- Kure Municipal Nigata Elementary School

== See also ==
- List of railway stations in Japan
