= Karugahama Station =

Railway station in Kure, Hiroshima Prefecture, Japan

Karugahama Station かるが浜駅
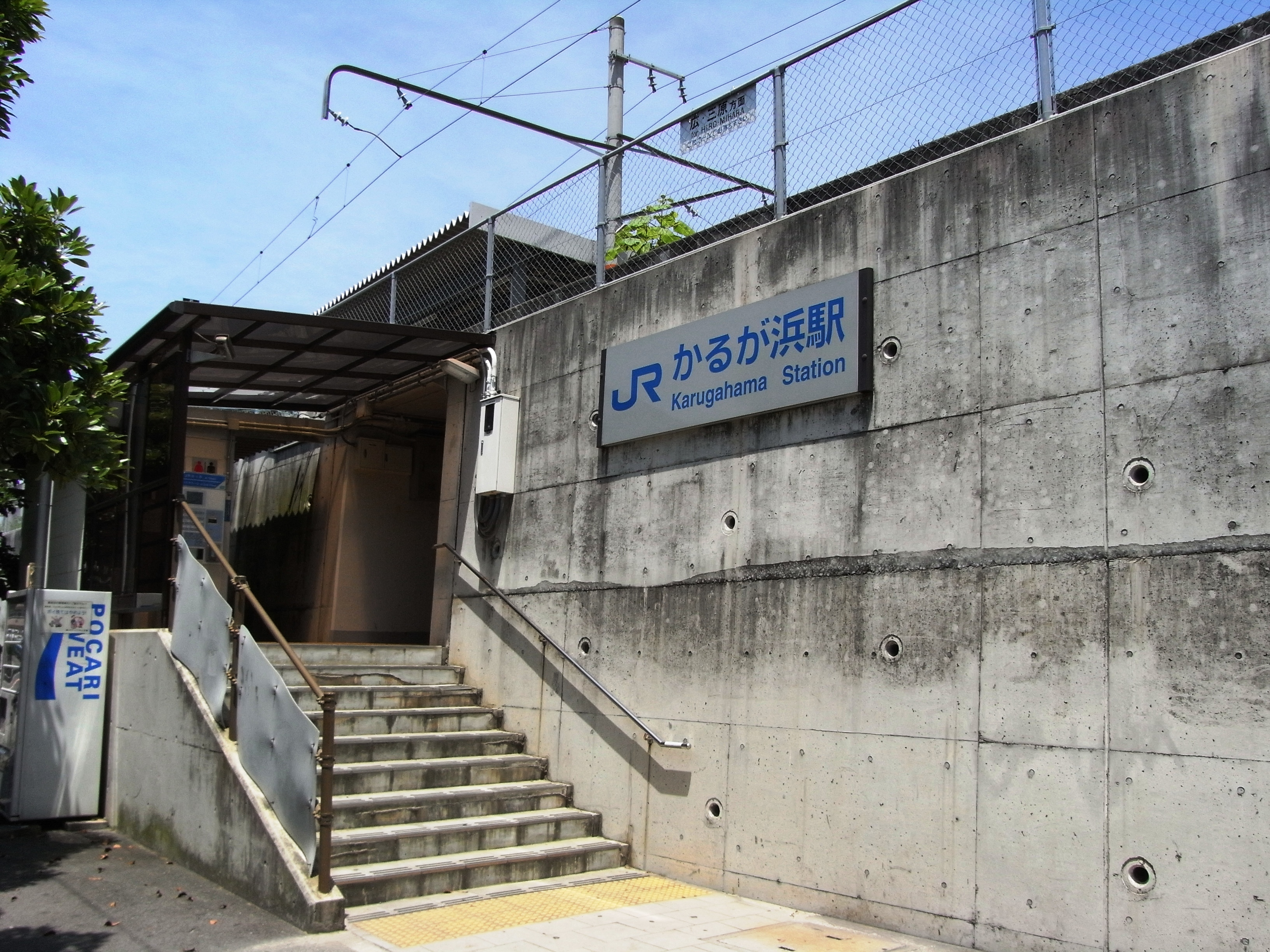
- Karugahama Station in July 2008

General information
- Location: 4 Karugachō, Kure-shi, Hiroshima-ken 737-0862; Japan
- Coordinates: 34°15′51.63″N 132°31′0.62″E
- Owner: West Japan Railway Company
- Operator: West Japan Railway Company
- Line: Y Kure Line
- Distance: 72.2 km (44.9 miles) from Mihara
- Platforms: 1 island platform
- Tracks: 2
- Connections: Bus stop

Construction
- Cycle facilities: Yes

Other information
- Status: Unstaffed
- Station code: JR-Y11
- Website: Official website

History
- Opened: 7 February 1999

Passengers
- FY2019: 207

Services
Preceding station	JR West	Following station
Tennō towards Hiroshima	Kure Line Local	Yoshiura towards Mihara
Location
- Location within Hiroshima Prefecture Location within Japan

Karugahama Station (かるが浜駅, Karugahama-eki) is a passenger railway station located in the city of Kure, Hiroshima Prefecture, Japan. It is operated by the West Japan Railway Company (JR West).

== Lines ==
Karugahama Station is served by the JR West Kure Line, and is located 72.2 kilometers from the terminus of the line at Mihara.

== Station layout ==
The station consists of one elevated island platform with the station facilities underneath. The station is unattended.

== Platforms ==
1	■ Y Kure Line	for Kure and Takehara
2	■ Y Kure Line	for Kaitaichi and Hiroshima

== History ==
Karugahama Station was opened on 7 February 1999.

== Passenger statistics ==
In fiscal 2019, the station was used by an average of 207 passengers daily.

== Surrounding area ==
- Karuga Beach
- Kure Municipal Yoshiura Junior High School
- Japan National Route 31

== See also ==
- List of railway stations in Japan
