= Ato Station =

Railway station in Kure, Hiroshima Prefecture, Japan

Ato Station 安登駅
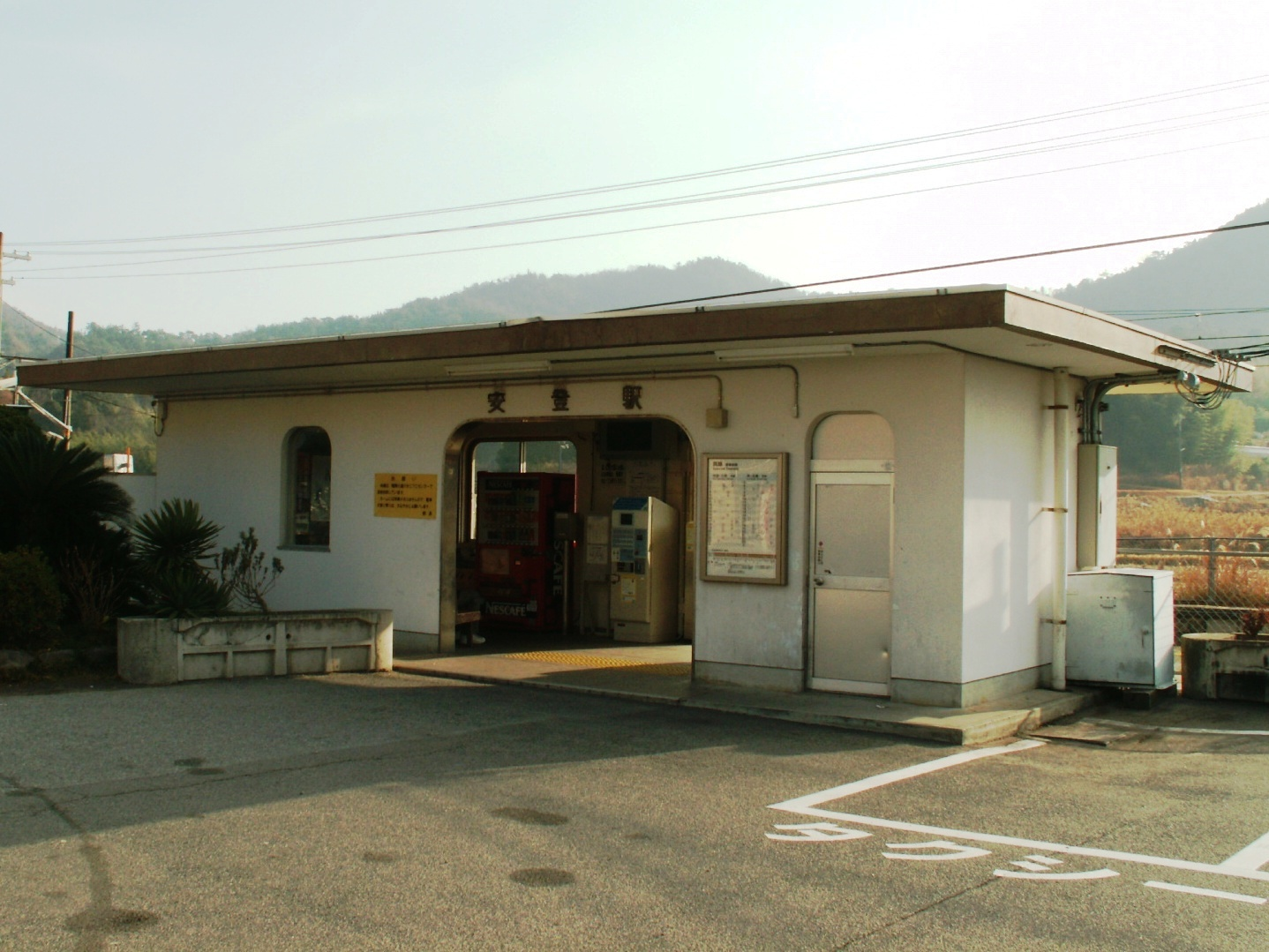
- Ato Station, December 2007

General information
- Location: 5-chōme-2 Yasuurachō Atonishi, Kure-shi, Hiroshima-ken 737-2512; Japan
- Coordinates: 34°15′15.4″N 132°43′21.1″E
- Owner: West Japan Railway Company
- Operator: West Japan Railway Company
- Line: Y Kure Line
- Distance: 48.7 km (30.3 miles) from Mihara
- Platforms: 2 side platforms
- Tracks: 2
- Connections: Bus stop

Construction
- Structure type: Ground level
- Cycle facilities: Yes
- Accessible: No

Other information
- Status: Unstaffed
- Station code: JR-Y20
- Website: Official website

History
- Opened: 24 November 1935

Passengers
- FY2019: 357

Services
Preceding station	JR West	Following station
Akikawajiri towards Hiroshima	Kure Line Local	Yasuura towards Mihara
Location
- Location within Hiroshima Prefecture Location within Japan

Ato Station (安登駅, Ato-eki) is a passenger railway station located in the city of Kure, Hiroshima Prefecture, Japan. It is operated by the West Japan Railway Company (JR West).

== Lines ==
Ato Station is served by the JR West Kure Line, and is located 48.7 kilometers from the terminus of the line at Mihara.

== Station layout ==
The station consists two ground-level opposed side platforms connected by a footbridge. The station is unattended.

== Platforms ==
station side (1)	■ Y Kure Line	for Takehara and Mihara
opposite side (2)	■ Y Kure Line	for Kure and Hiroshima

== History ==
Ato Station was opened on 24 November 1935. With the privatization of the Japanese National Railways (JNR) on 1 April 1987, the station came under the control of JR West.

== Passenger statistics ==
In fiscal 2019, the station was used by an average of 357 passengers daily.

== Surrounding area ==
- Kure Municipal Ato Elementary School

== See also ==
- List of railway stations in Japan
