= Akiaga Station =

Railway station in Kure, Hiroshima Prefecture, Japan

Akiaga Station 安芸阿賀駅
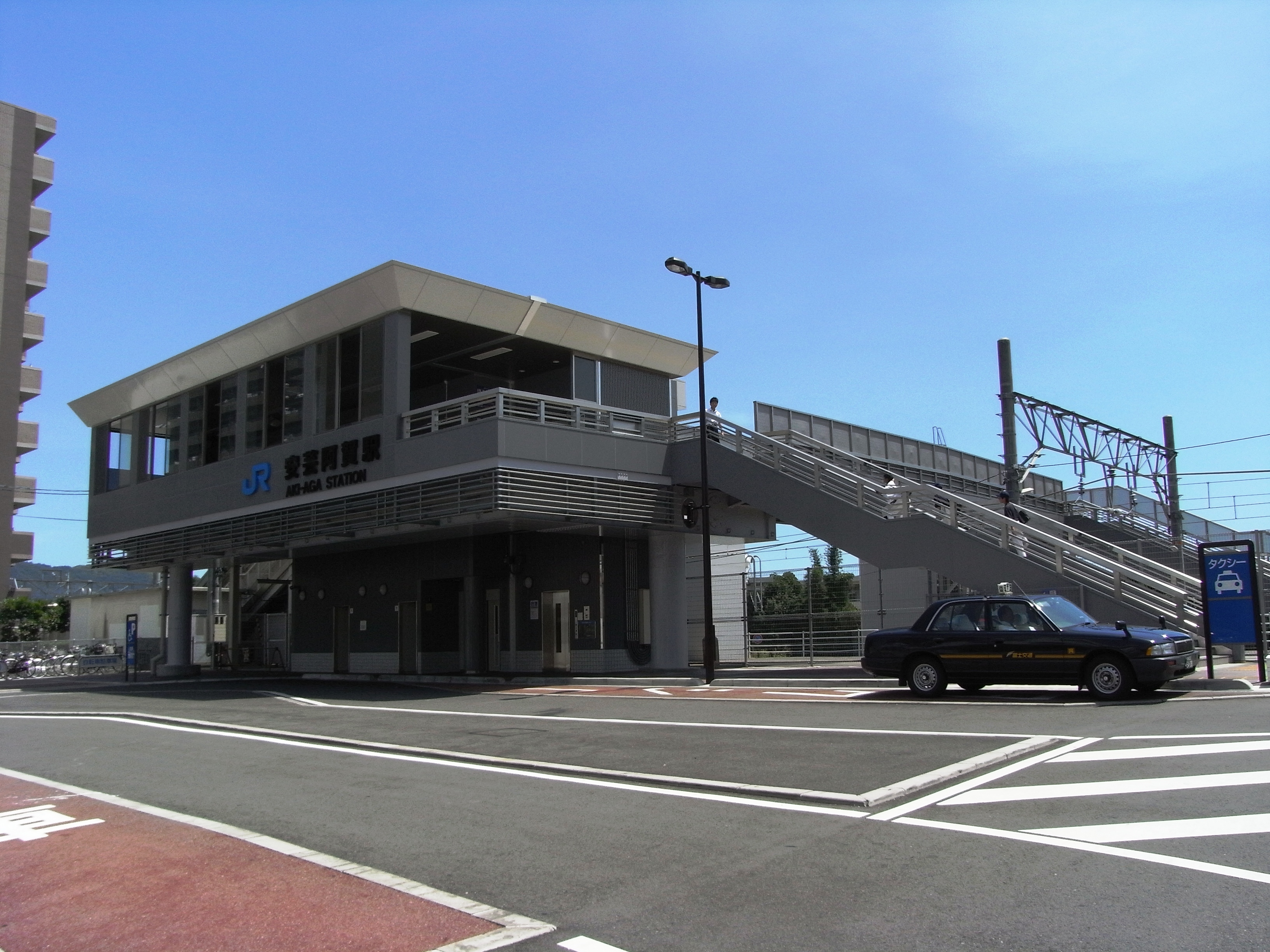
- Akiaga Station building in 2008

General information
- Location: 6-chōme-3 Agachūō, Kure-shi, Hiroshima-ken 737-0003; Japan
- Coordinates: 34°14′8.8″N 132°36′0.3″E
- Owner: West Japan Railway Company
- Operator: West Japan Railway Company
- Line: Y Kure Line
- Distance: 62.9 km (39.1 miles) from Mihara
- Platforms: 2 side platforms
- Tracks: 2
- Connections: Bus stop

Construction
- Structure type: Elevated
- Cycle facilities: Yes
- Accessible: Yes

Other information
- Status: Staffed (Midori no Madoguchi)
- Station code: JR-Y15
- Website: Official website

History
- Opened: 24 March 1935

Passengers
- FY2019: 2336

Services
Preceding station	JR West	Following station
Kure towards Hiroshima	Kure Line Local	Shin-Hiro towards Mihara
Location
- Location within Hiroshima Prefecture Location within Japan

Akiaga Station (安芸阿賀駅, Akiaga-eki) is a passenger railway station located in the city of Kure, Hiroshima Prefecture, Japan. It is operated by the West Japan Railway Company (JR West).

== Lines ==
Akiaga Station is served by the JR West Kure Line, and is located 62.9 kilometers from the terminus of the line at Mihara.

== Station layout ==
The station consists of two opposed side platforms, connected by an elevated station building.The station has a Midori no Madoguchi staffed ticket office.

== Platforms ==
1	■ Y Kure Line	for Takehara and Mihara
2	■ Y Kure Line	for Kure and Hiroshima

== History ==
Akiaga Station was opened on 24 March 1935. After the Nihori Sea Route ferry was abolished on 1 July 1982, the connection function between Kure's Nigata Port at Nigata Station to Horie Station (Horie Pier) on the opposite shore of the Seto Inland Sea in Matsuyama, Ehime was transferred to Akiaga Station (the port of call for the Kure-Matsuyama Ferry). With the privatization of the Japanese National Railways (JNR) on 1 April 1987, the station came under the control of JR West.

== Passenger statistics ==
In fiscal 2019, the station was used by an average of 2336 passengers daily.

== Surrounding area ==
- Aga Port
- Japan National Route 185
- Kure City Hall Aga Civic Center (Branch)
- Hiroshima Bunka Gakuen University Aga Campus
- Kure Municipal Kure High School
- Kure National College of Technology

== See also ==
- List of railway stations in Japan
