= Yoshiura Station =

Railway station in Kure, Hiroshima Prefecture, Japan

Yoshiura Station 吉浦駅
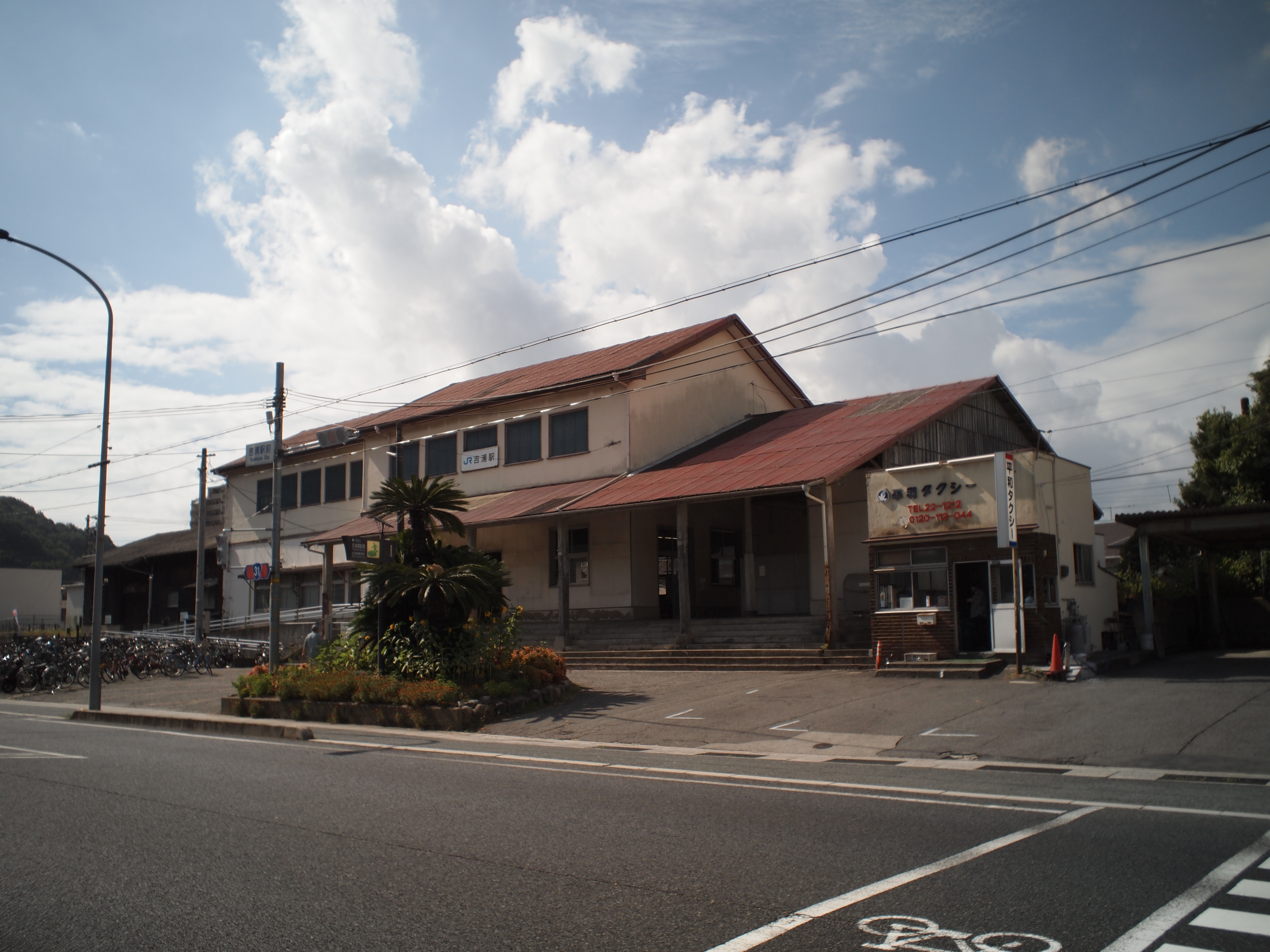
- Yoshiura Station in 2020

General information
- Location: 1-chōme-Yoshiura Nakamachi, Kure-shi, Hiroshima-ken 737-0853; Japan
- Coordinates: 34°15′28.44″N 132°31′37.79″E
- Owner: West Japan Railway Company
- Operator: West Japan Railway Company
- Line: Y Kure Line
- Distance: 71.0 km (44.1 miles) from Mihara
- Platforms: 1 side + 1 island platform
- Tracks: 2
- Connections: Bus stop

Construction
- Structure type: Ground level
- Cycle facilities: Yes

Other information
- Status: Unstaffed
- Station code: JR-Y12
- Website: Official website

History
- Opened: 27 December 1903

Passengers
- FY2019: 1206

Services
Preceding station	JR West	Following station
Karugahama towards Hiroshima	Kure Line Local	Kawaraishi towards Mihara
Saka towards Hiroshima	Kure Line Rapid Akiji Liner	Kure towards Mihara
Location
- Location within Hiroshima Prefecture Location within Japan

Yoshiura Station (吉浦駅, Yoshiura-eki) is a passenger railway station in the city of Kure, Hiroshima Prefecture, Japan. It is operated by the West Japan Railway Company (JR West).

== Lines ==
Yoshiura Station is served by the JR West Kure Line, and is 71.0 kilometers from the terminus of the line at Mihara.

== Station layout ==
The station consists of one side platform and one island platform connected by a footbridge; however, only one side of the island platform is in use, giving the station effectively two parallel side platforms The station is unattended.

== Platforms ==
1	■ Y Kure Line	for Kure and Takehara
2	■ Y Kure Line	for Kaitaichi and Hiroshima

== History ==
Yoshiura Station was opened on 27 December 1903. With the privatization of the Japanese National Railways (JNR) on 1 April 1987, the station came under the control of JR West.

== Passenger statistics ==
In fiscal 2019, the station was used by an average of 1206 passengers daily.

== Surrounding area ==
- Japan Maritime Self-Defense Force Kure Refueling Depot
- Kure Municipal Yoshiura Elementary School
- Kure City Hall Yoshiura Branch Office

== See also ==
- List of railway stations in Japan
