= Kazahaya Station =

Railway station in Higashihiroshima, Hiroshima Prefecture, Japan

Kazahaya Station 風早駅
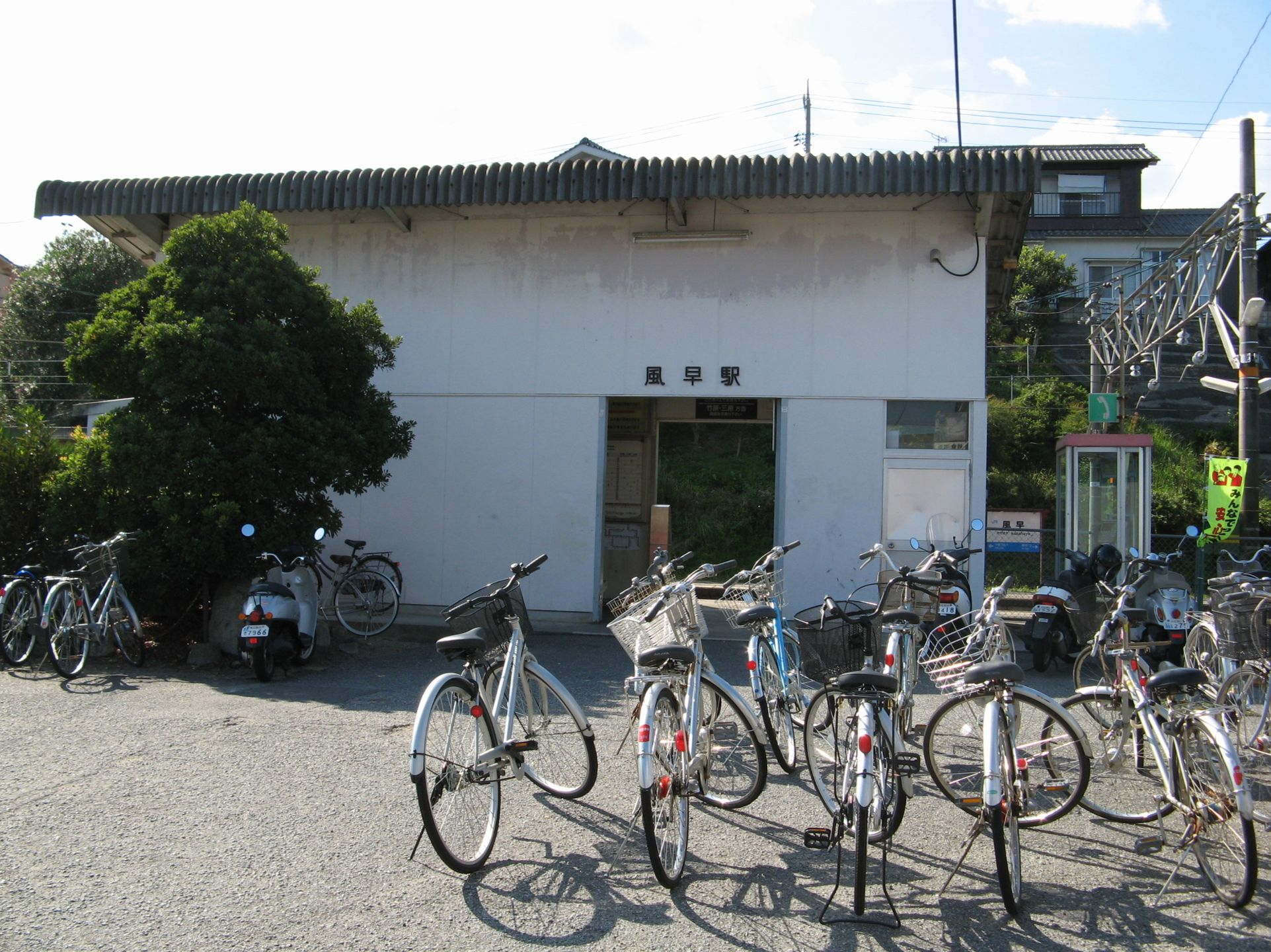
- Kazahaya Station, October 2007

General information
- Location: Akitsucho Kazahaya, Higashihiroshima-shi, Hiroshima-ken 739-2403; Japan
- Coordinates: 34°18′11.73″N 132°47′45.22″E
- Owner: West Japan Railway Company
- Operator: West Japan Railway Company
- Line: Y Kure Line
- Distance: 37.9 km (23.5 miles) from Mihara
- Platforms: 2 side platforms
- Tracks: 2
- Connections: Bus stop

Construction
- Structure type: Ground level
- Cycle facilities: Yes
- Accessible: No

Other information
- Status: Unstaffed
- Station code: JR-Y22
- Website: Official website

History
- Opened: 17 February 1935

Passengers
- FY2019: 205

Services
Preceding station	JR West	Following station
Yasuura towards Hiroshima	Kure Line Local	Akitsu towards Mihara
Location
- Location within Hiroshima Prefecture Location within Japan

Kazahaya Station (風早駅, Kazahaya-eki) is a passenger railway station located in the city of Higashihiroshima, Hiroshima Prefecture, Japan. It is operated by the West Japan Railway Company (JR West).

== Lines ==
Kazahaya Station is served by the JR West Kure Line, and is located 37.9 kilometers from the terminus of the line at Mihara.

== Station layout ==
The station consists of two opposed unnumbered ground-level side platforms connected by a footbridge. The station is unattended.

== Platforms ==
opposite side (1)	■ Y Kure Line	for Takehara and Mihara
station side (2)	■ Y Kure Line	for Kure and Hiroshima

== History ==
Kazahaya Station was opened on 17 February 1935. With the privatization of the Japanese National Railways (JNR) on 1 April 1987, the station came under the control of JR West.

== Passenger statistics ==
In fiscal 2019, the station was used by an average of 205 passengers daily.

== Surrounding area ==
- Japan National Route 185
- Hiroshima Prefectural Toyota High School

== See also ==
- List of railway stations in Japan
