= Akikawajiri Station =

Railway station in Kure, Hiroshima Prefecture, Japan

Akikawajiri Station 安芸川尻駅
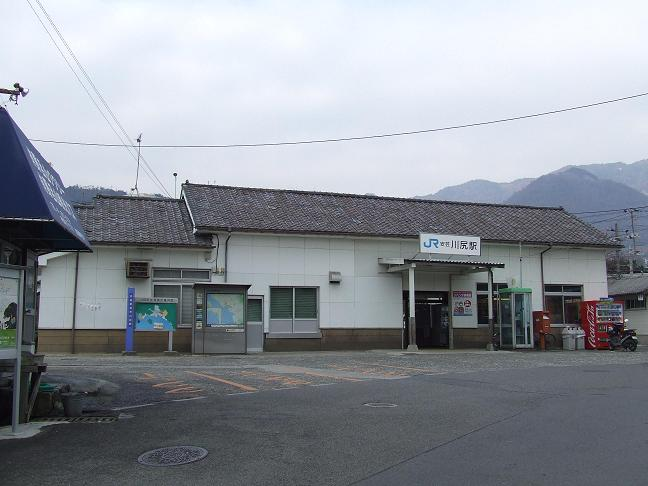
- Akikawajiri Station, December 2007

General information
- Location: 2-chōme-19 Kawajirichōnishi, Kure-shi, Hiroshima-ken 737-2603; Japan
- Coordinates: 34°13′58.29″N 132°41′29.89″E
- Owner: West Japan Railway Company
- Operator: West Japan Railway Company
- Line: Y Kure Line
- Distance: 52.8 km (32.8 miles) from Mihara
- Platforms: 1 island platform
- Tracks: 2
- Connections: Bus stop

Construction
- Structure type: Ground level
- Cycle facilities: Yes
- Accessible: No

Other information
- Status: Unstaffed
- Station code: JR-Y19
- Website: Official website

History
- Opened: 24 November 1935

Passengers
- FY2019: 761

Services
Preceding station	JR West	Following station
Nigata towards Hiroshima	Kure Line Local	Ato towards Mihara
Location
- Location within Hiroshima Prefecture Location within Japan

Akikawajiri Station (安芸川尻駅, Akikawajiri-eki) is a passenger railway station located in the city of Kure, Hiroshima Prefecture, Japan. It is operated by the West Japan Railway Company (JR West).

== Lines ==
Akikawajiri Station is served by the JR West Kure Line, and is located 52.8 kilometers from the terminus of the line at Mihara.

== Station layout ==
The station consists of one unnumbered island platform connected to the station building by a footbridge. The station is unattended.

== Platforms ==
station side (1)	■ Y Kure Line	for Takehara and Mihara
opposite side (2)	■ Y Kure Line	for Kure and Hiroshima

== History ==
Akikawajiri Station was opened on 24 November 1935. With the privatization of the Japanese National Railways (JNR) on 1 April 1987, the station came under the control of JR West.

== Passenger statistics ==
In fiscal 2019, the station was used by an average of 761 passengers daily.

== Surrounding area ==
- Japan National Route 185
- Kawajiri Port
- Kure City Hall Kawajiri Civic Center (Branch)
- Kure Municipal Kawajiri Elementary School
- Kure Municipal Kawajiri Junior High School

== See also ==
- List of railway stations in Japan
