= Kawaraishi Station =

Railway station in Kure, Hiroshima Prefecture, Japan

Kawaraishi Station 川原石駅
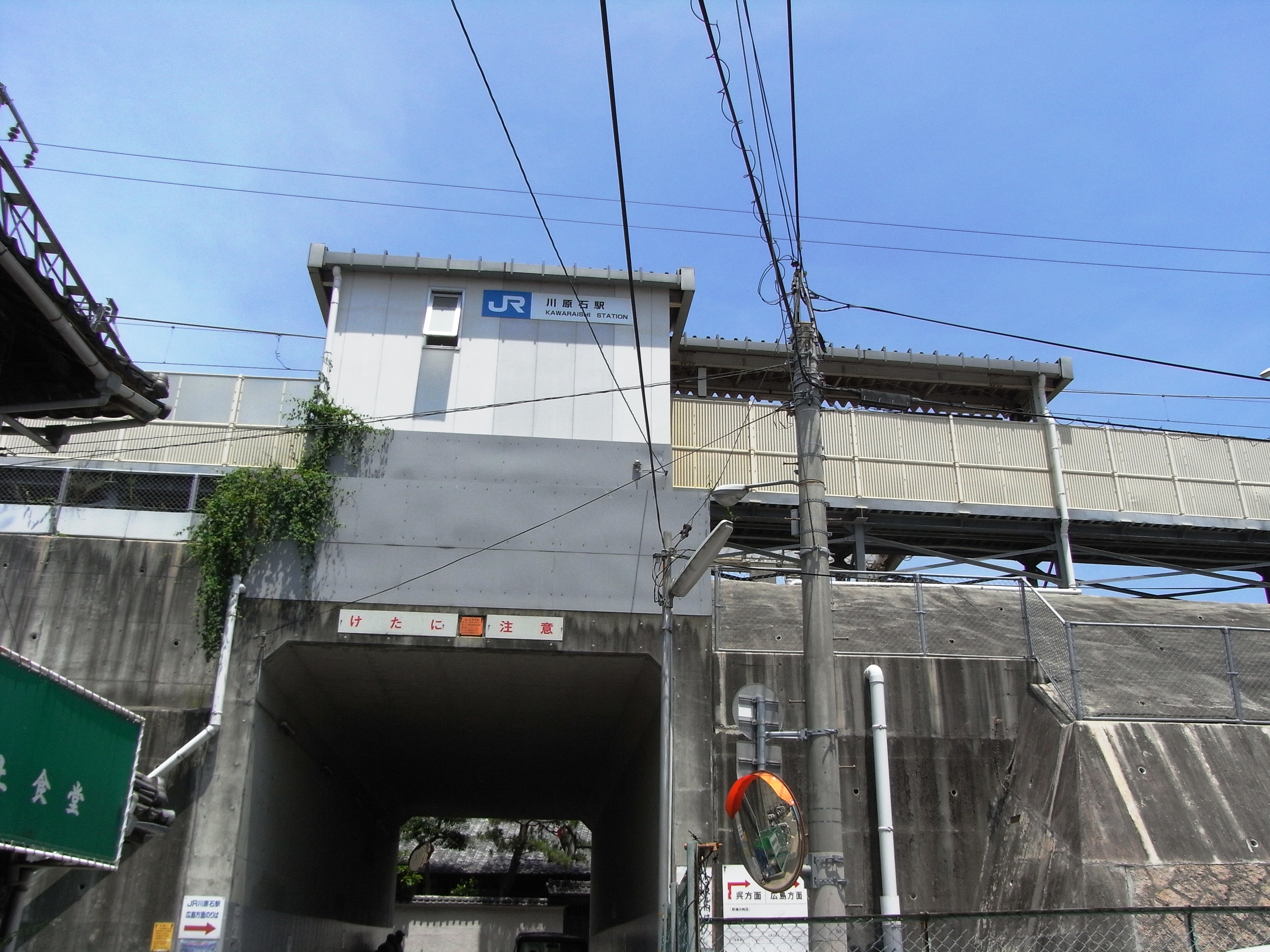
- Kawaraishi Station building in 2008

General information
- Location: 3-chōme-8 Kaigan, Kure-shi, Hiroshima-ken 737-0823; Japan
- Coordinates: 34°14′55.19″N 132°32′29.37″E
- Owner: West Japan Railway Company
- Operator: West Japan Railway Company
- Line: Y Kure Line
- Distance: 68.7 km (42.7 miles) from Mihara
- Platforms: 2 side platforms
- Tracks: 2
- Connections: Bus stop

Construction
- Cycle facilities: Yes
- Accessible: No

Other information
- Status: Unstaffed
- Station code: JR-Y13
- Website: Official website

History
- Opened: 24 November 1935
- Closed: 1940-1958

Passengers
- FY2019: 496

Services
| Preceding station | JR West | Following station |
|---|---|---|
| Yoshiura towards Hiroshima | Kure Line Local | Kure towards Mihara |
Location
- Location within Hiroshima Prefecture Location within Japan

Kawaraishi Station (川原石駅, Kawaraishi-eki) is a passenger railway station located in the city of Kure, Hiroshima Prefecture, Japan. It is operated by the West Japan Railway Company (JR West).

== Lines ==
Kawaraishi Station is served by the JR West Kure Line, and is located 68.7 kilometers from the terminus of the line at Mihara.

== Station layout ==
The station consists of two elevated unnumbered side platforms. There are separate entrances and exits for each of the platforms. The station is unattended.

== Platforms ==
| north | ■ Y Kure Line | for Kure and Takehara |
| south | ■ Y Kure Line | for Kaitaichi and Hiroshima |

== History ==
Kawaraishi Station was opened on 24 November 1935. It was closed from1 November 1940 to 1 August 1958. With the privatization of the Japanese National Railways (JNR) on 1 April 1987, the station came under the control of JR West. On 7 February 1999, it was moved from its original location, which was 500 meters in the direction of Hiroshima, and reopened with a second platform.

== Passenger statistics ==
In fiscal 2019, the station was used by an average of 496 passengers daily.

== Surrounding area ==
- Japan Coast Guard Academy
- Kure Municipal Minatomachi Elementary School
- Japan National Route 31

== See also ==
- List of railway stations in Japan
