= Saka Station =

Railway station in Saka, Hiroshima Prefecture, Japan

Saka Station 坂駅
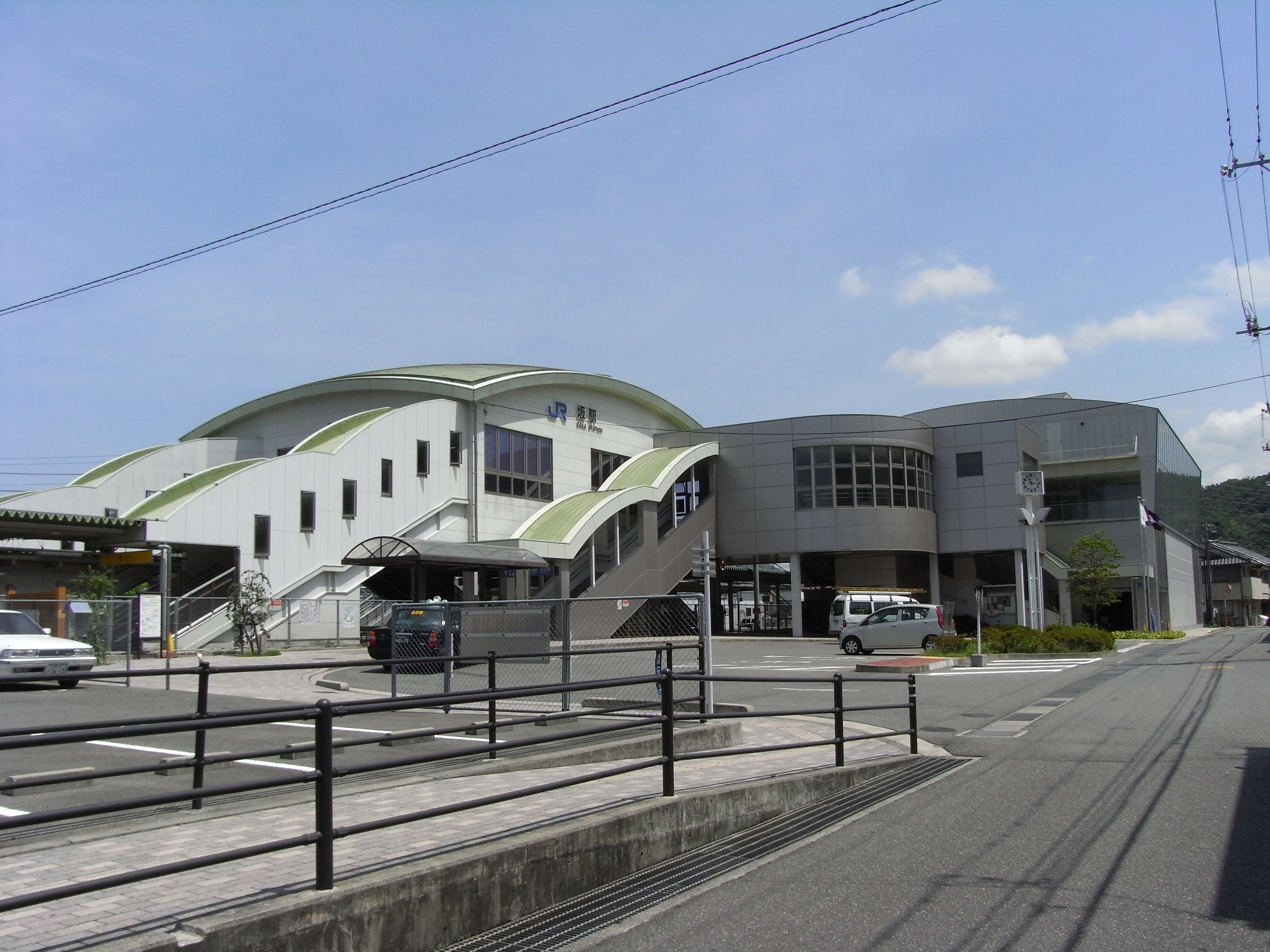
- Saka Station in July 2008

General information
- Location: 3-chōme-1 Heiseigahama, Saka-cho, Aki-gun, Hiroshima-ken 731-4312; Japan
- Coordinates: 34°20′19.59″N 132°30′38.99″E
- Owner: West Japan Railway Company
- Operator: West Japan Railway Company
- Line: Y Kure Line
- Distance: 81.8 km (50.8 miles) from Mihara
- Platforms: 1 side + 1 island platforms
- Tracks: 4
- Connections: Bus stop

Other information
- Status: Staffed (Midori no Madoguchi )
- Station code: JR-Y06
- Website: Official website

History
- Opened: 27 December 1903

Passengers
- FY2019: 3349

Services
Preceding station	JR West	Following station
Yano towards Hiroshima	Kure Line Local	Mizushiri towards Mihara
Yano towards Hiroshima	Kure Line Rapid; Akiji Liner	Kure towards Mihara
Location
- Location within Hiroshima Prefecture Location within Japan

Saka Station (坂駅, Saka-eki) is a passenger railway station located in the town of Saka, Aki District, Hiroshima Prefecture, Japan. It is operated by the West Japan Railway Company (JR West).

== Lines ==
Saka Station is served by the JR West Kure Line and is 81.8 kilometers from the terminus of that line at Mihara.

== Station layout ==
The station consists of one side platform and one island platform connected by an elevated station building. The station has a Midori no Madoguchi staffed ticket office.

== Platforms ==
1	■ Y Kure Line	for Kure and Takehara
2, 3	■ Y Kure Line	for Kaitaichi and Hiroshima

== History ==
Saka Station was opened on 27 December 1903.

== Passenger statistics ==
In fiscal 2019, the station was used by an average of 3349 passengers daily.

== Surrounding area ==
The area around the station runs parallel to Japan National Route 31. Commercial facilities and corporate offices are concentrated on the north side of the station.

- Saka Town Office
- Saka Municipal Saka Elementary School
- Hiroshima Prefectural Police Academy

== See also ==
- List of railway stations in Japan
