= Akitsu Station (Hiroshima) =

Railway station in Higashihiroshima, Hiroshima Prefecture, Japan

Akitsu Station 安芸津駅
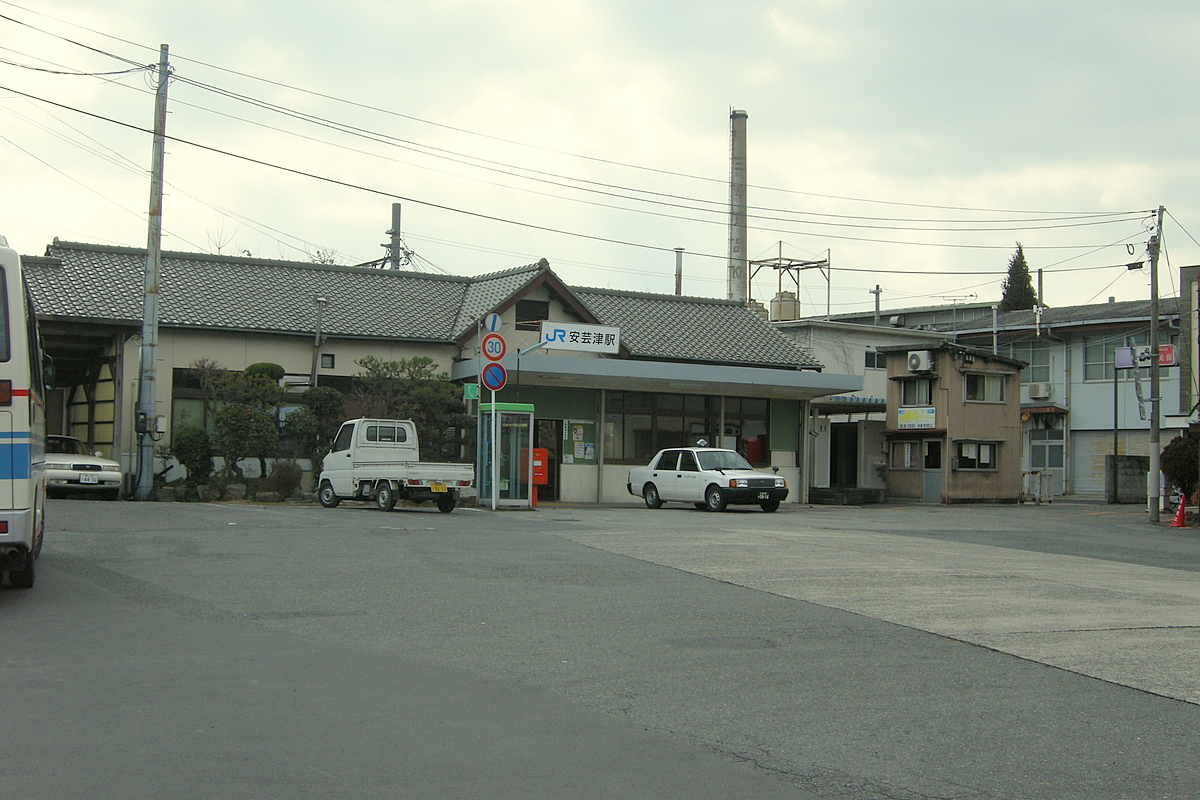
- Akitsu Station, October 2007

General information
- Location: 441 Akitsucho Mitsu, Higashihiroshima-shi, Hiroshima-ken 739-2402; Japan
- Coordinates: 34°19′6.07″N 132°49′3.67″E
- Owner: West Japan Railway Company
- Operator: West Japan Railway Company
- Line: Y Kure Line
- Distance: 34.7 km (21.6 miles) from Mihara
- Platforms: 2 side platforms
- Tracks: 2
- Connections: Bus stop

Construction
- Structure type: Ground level
- Cycle facilities: Yes
- Accessible: No

Other information
- Status: Staffed
- Station code: JR-Y23
- Website: Official website

History
- Opened: 17 February 1935
- Former names: Akimitsu Station (to 1949)

Passengers
- FY2019: 205

Services
Preceding station	JR West	Following station
Kazahaya towards Hiroshima	Kure Line Local	Yoshina towards Mihara
Location
- Location within Hiroshima Prefecture Location within Japan

Akitsu Station (安芸津駅, Akitsu-eki) is a passenger railway station located in the city of Higashihiroshima, Hiroshima Prefecture, Japan. It is operated by the West Japan Railway Company (JR West).

== Lines ==
Akitsu Station is served by the JR West Kure Line, and is located 34.7 kilometers from the terminus of the line at Mihara.

== Station layout ==
The station consists of two opposed ground-level side platforms connected by an underground. The station is staffed.

== Platforms ==
1	■ Y Kure Line	for Takehara and Mihara
2	■ Y Kure Line	for Kure and Hiroshima

== History ==
Akitsu Station started its operation on 17 February 1935. At this time this station was known as Akimitsu Station (安芸三津駅, Akimitsu-eki) but on 20 November 1949, this station was renamed to Akitsu Station. With the privatization of the Japanese National Railways (JNR) on 1 April 1987, the station came under the control of JR West.

== Passenger statistics ==
In fiscal 2019, the station was used by an average of 352 passengers daily.

== Surrounding area ==
- Higashihiroshima City Hall Akitsu Branch
- Higashi Hiroshima Municipal Akitsu Junior High School
- Higashihiroshima City Mitsu Elementary School
- Prefectural Akitsu Hospital

== See also ==
- List of railway stations in Japan
