= Japan National Route 185 =

Road in Hiroshima prefecture, Japan

National Route 185
- 国道185号
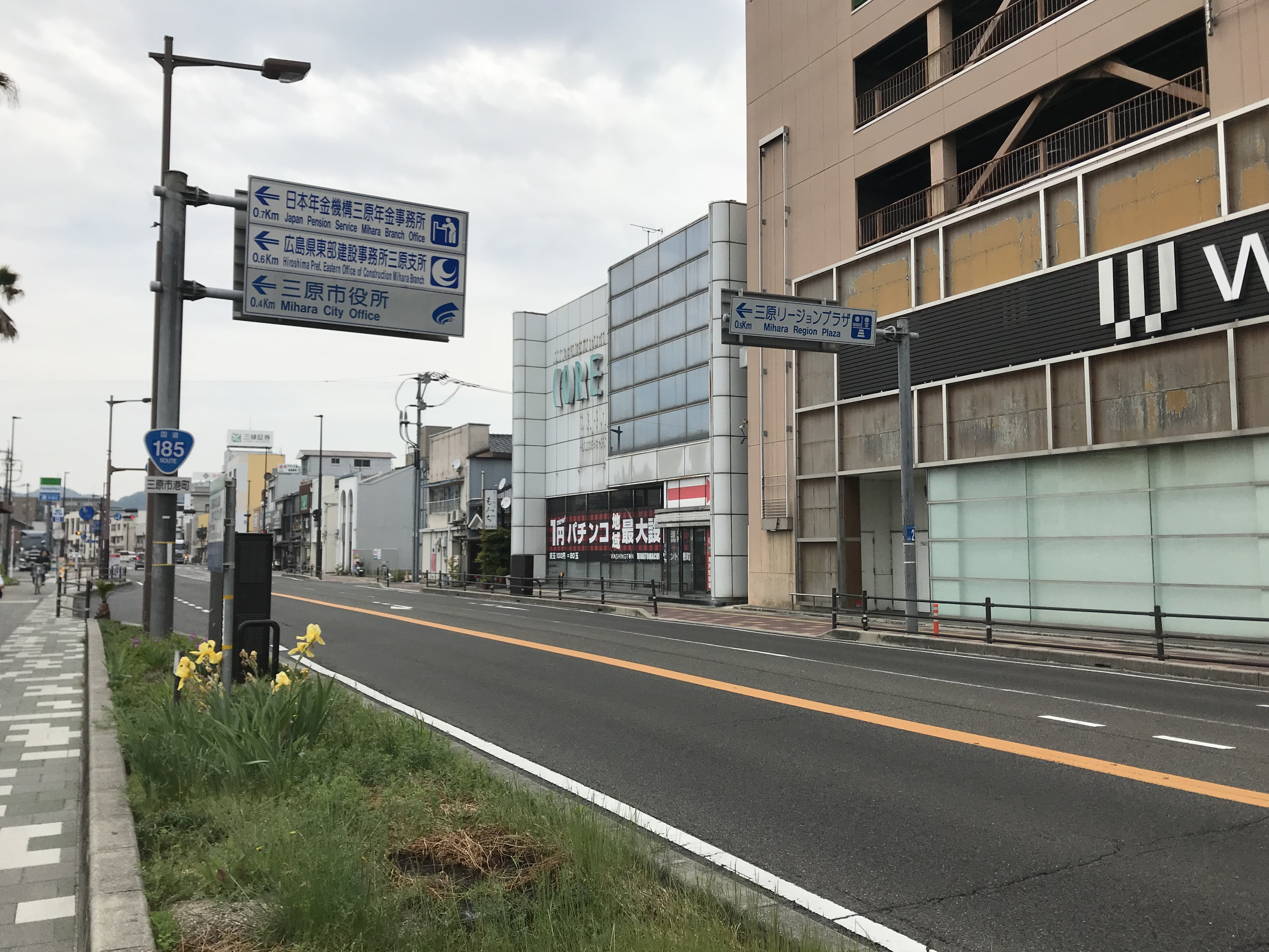

Route information
- Length: 68.4 km (42.5 mi)
- Existed: 18 May 1953–present

Major junctions
- West end: National Route 31 and National Route 487 in Kure
- East end: National Route 2 in Mihara

Location
- Country: Japan

Highway system
- National highways of Japan; Expressways of Japan
| ← National Route 184 | → National Route 186 |

National Route 185 is a national highway of Japan connecting Kure, Hiroshima and Mihara, Hiroshima in Japan, with a total length of 68.4 km (42.5 mi).
