= JNR Class EF67 =

Japanese electric locomotive class

Class EF67
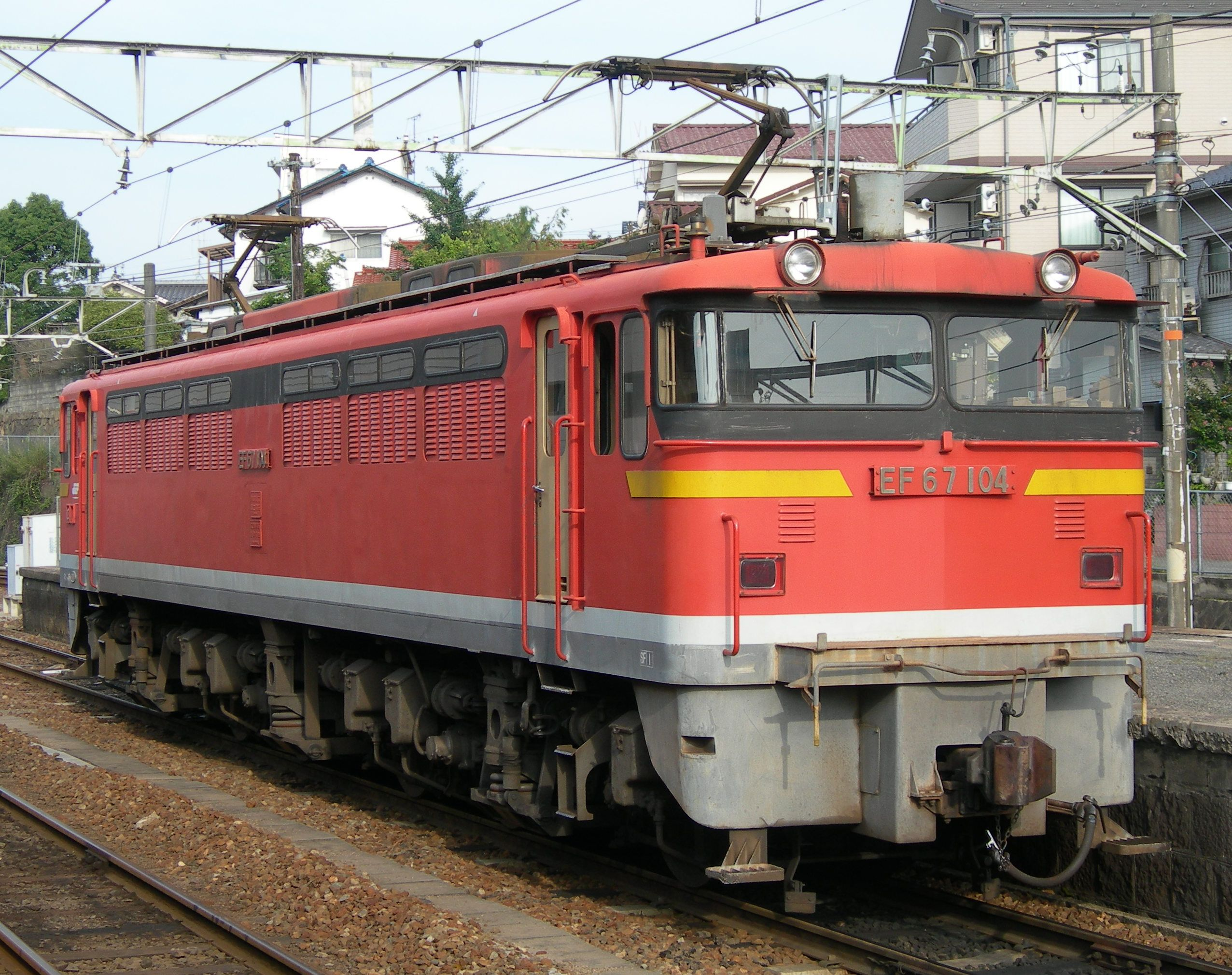
- Refurbished EF67 104 in August 2009
Type and origin
- Power type: Electric
- Rebuild date: 1982–1990
- Number rebuilt: 8
Specifications
- Configuration
  - UIC: Bo′Bo′Bo′
  - Commonwealth: Bo-Bo-Bo
- Gauge: 1,067 mm (3 ft 6 in)
- Length: 17,050 mm (55 ft 11 1/4 in) (EF67-0); 16,875 mm (55 ft 4 3/8 in) (EF67-100)
- Width: 2,800 mm (9 ft 2 1/4 in) (EF67-0); 2,949 mm (9 ft 8 1/8 in) (EF67-100)
- Height: 3,819 mm (12 ft 6 3/8 in) (EF67-0); 3,970 mm (13 ft 1/4 in) (EF67-100)
- Loco weight: 99.6 t (98.0 long tons; 109.8 short tons)
- Electric system/s: 1,500 V DC overhead line
- Current pickup: Pantograph
Performance figures
- Maximum speed: 100 km/h (62 mph)
- Power output: 2.85 MW (3,820 hp)
- Tractive effort: 21,150 kgf (46,600 lbf)
Career
- Operators: JR Freight
- Number in class: 0
- Locale: Hiroshima Depot
- Retired: February 2022
- Preserved: 1
- Current owner: JR Freight
- Disposition: Withdrawn

The Class EF67 is a retired class of electric locomotives operated by Japan Freight Railway Company (JR Freight) as dedicated banking locomotives on the steeply-graded "Senohachi" section of the Sanyo Main Line between Seno and Hachihonmatsu. The class is subdivided into three EF67-0 locomotives converted between 1982 and 1984 from former Class EF60 locomotives, and five EF67-100 locomotives converted in 1990 from former Class EF65 locomotives.

With the introduction of the Class EF210-300 from 2013, the Class EF67 fleet was gradually withdrawn, with the last unit, EF67 105, being withdrawn from regular service in February 2022.

== EF67-0 ==
Three EF67-0s were built from former 4th-batch Class EF60 locomotives from 1982 for use banking freight trains over 1,000 tonnes, for which the former EF61-200 banking locomotives were unsuitable. The No. 1 end was modified with a gangway door and access platform. The locomotives were painted in an all-over orange livery (officially "Red No. 11") with yellow strips below the cab windows. These three locomotives are fitted with PS22D scissors-type pantographs.

The EF67-0s were equipped with an automatic uncoupling mechanism at the No. 1 end to enable the banking locomotives to be uncoupled on the fly, but uncoupling while in motion was discontinued from the start of the 22 March 2002 timetable revision.

Following the introduction of the Class EF210-300 in 2013, EF67 2 and 3 were withdrawn, with EF67 1 following in 2014. As of April 2022, EF67 1 is preserved at Hiroshima Depot.

=== Conversion details ===
The EF67-0s were converted as shown below.

Number	Former number	Built	Rebuilt
EF67 1	EF60 104	30 September 1964	31 March 1982
EF67 2	EF60 129	27 October 1964	30 January 1984
EF67 3	EF60 88	9 July 1964	25 December 1986

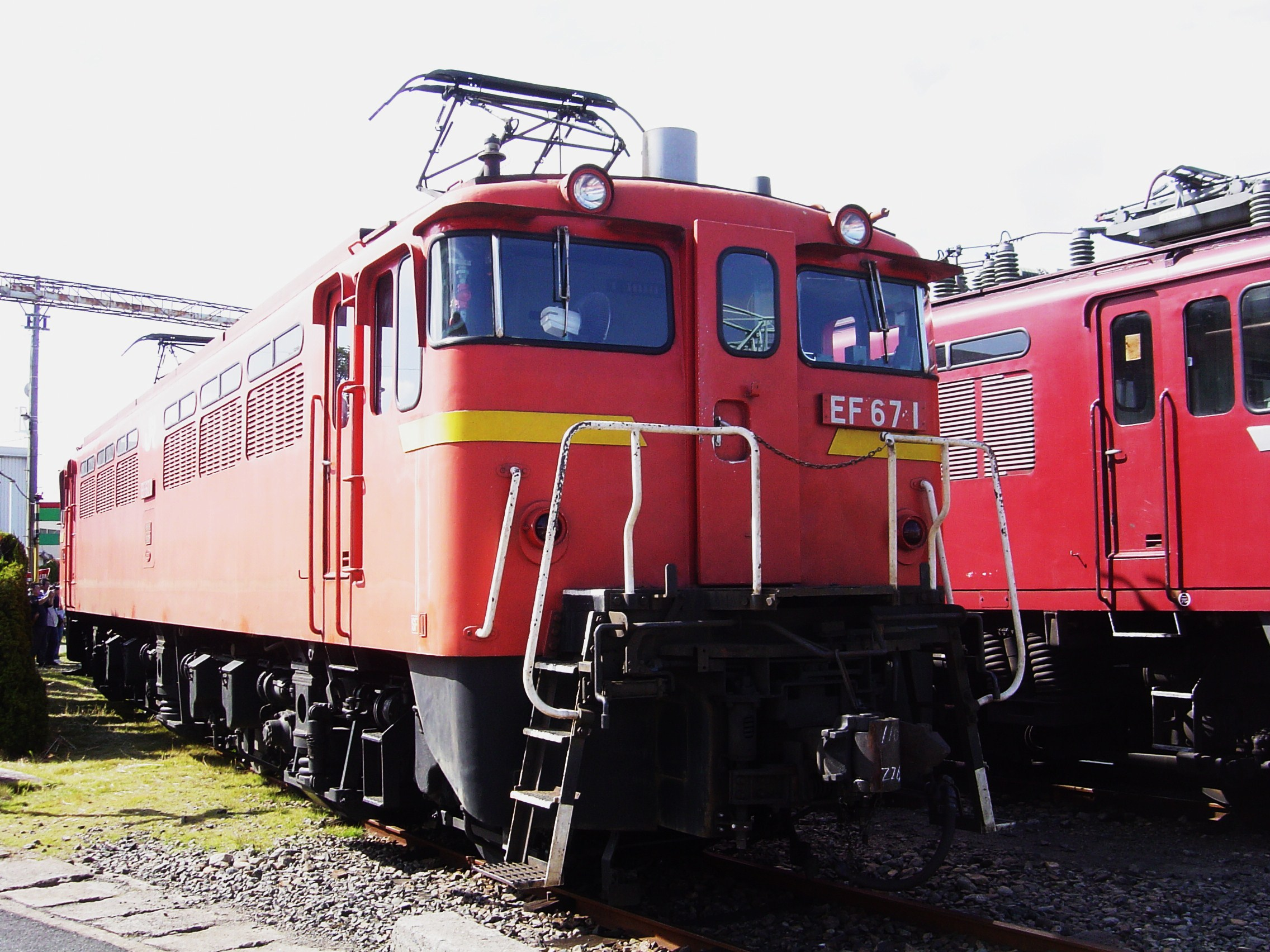
Number 1 end of EF67 1, October 2005

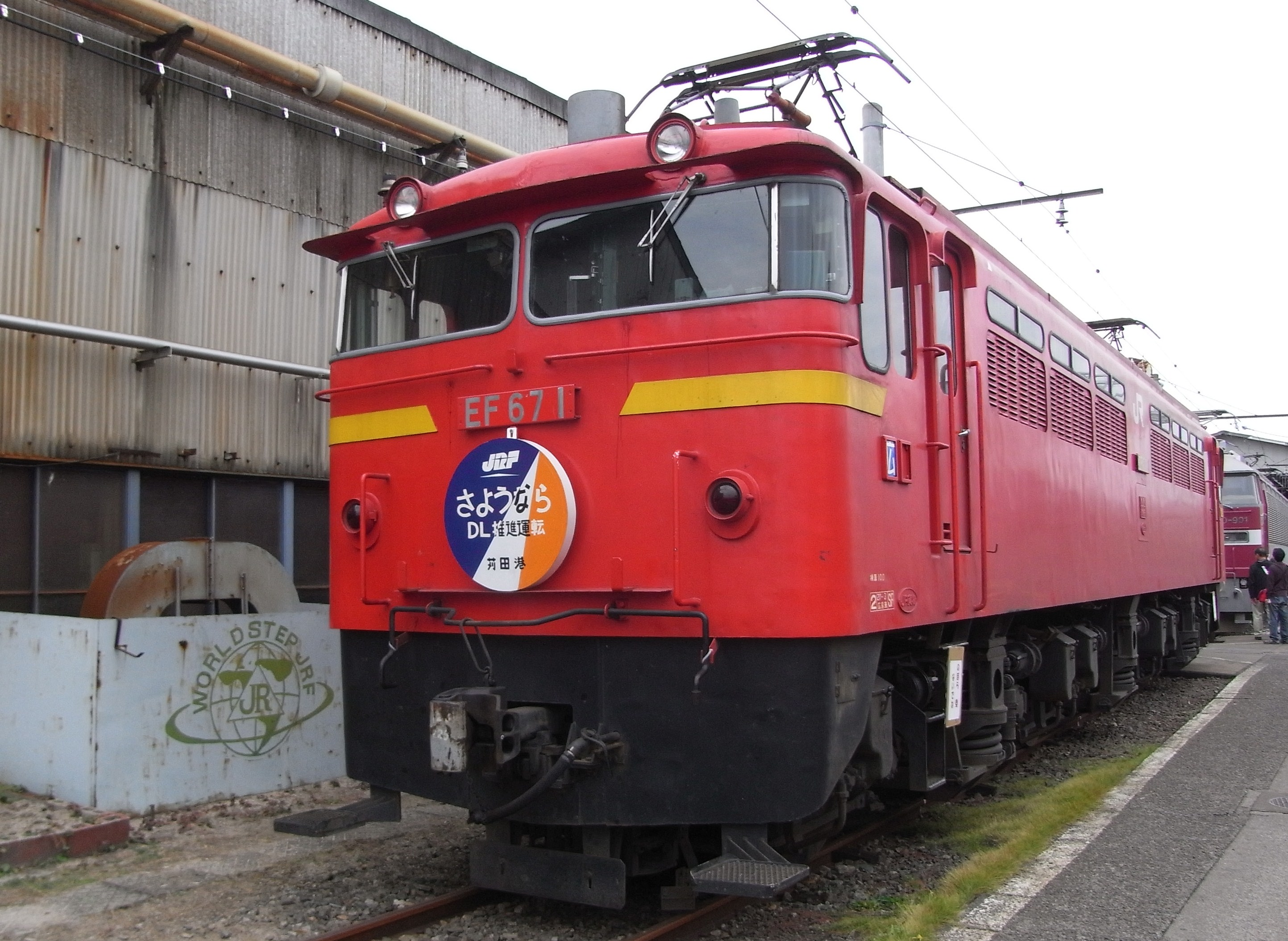
Number 2 end of EF67 1, October 2009

== EF67-100 ==
Five EF67-100s were built from former 6th-batch Class EF65-0 locomotives from 1990 to replace the ageing EF61-200 banking locomotives. The EF67-100 fleet was refurbished between 2003 and 2004, and repainted into a revised livery with grey and white lines along the lower body side. These locomotives were originally fitted with PS22B scissors-type pantographs, which were replaced with single-arm pantographs on refurbishment, but these were subsequently returned to PS22B scissors-type pantographs.

EF67 103 and 104 were scrapped in 2016, and 101 and 102 were scrapped in 2020. The last EF67 in operation, EF67 105, was withdrawn from regular service in February 2022, and operated a commemorative final-run service on 29 March of that year.

=== Conversion details ===
The EF67-100s were converted as shown below.

Number	Former number	Built	Rebuilt
EF67 101	EF65 134	6 August 1970	23 March 1990
EF67 102	EF65 131	16 July 1970	1 May 1990
EF67 103	EF65 133	30 July 1970	29 September 1990
EF67 104	EF65 132	20 July 1970	9 November 1990
EF67 105	EF65 135	20 August 1970	8 March 1991

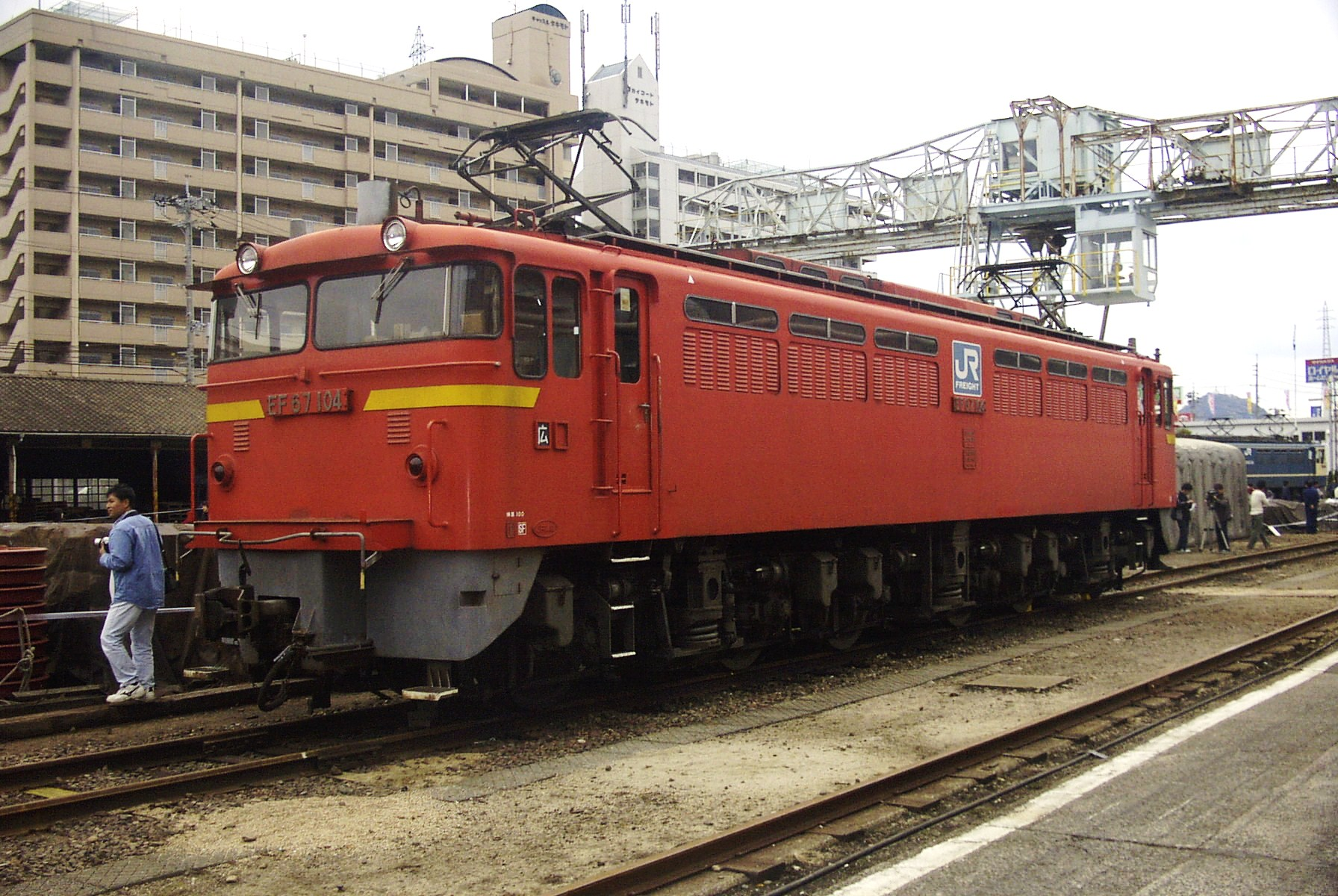
Number 1 end of unrefurbished EF67 104 in October 2002

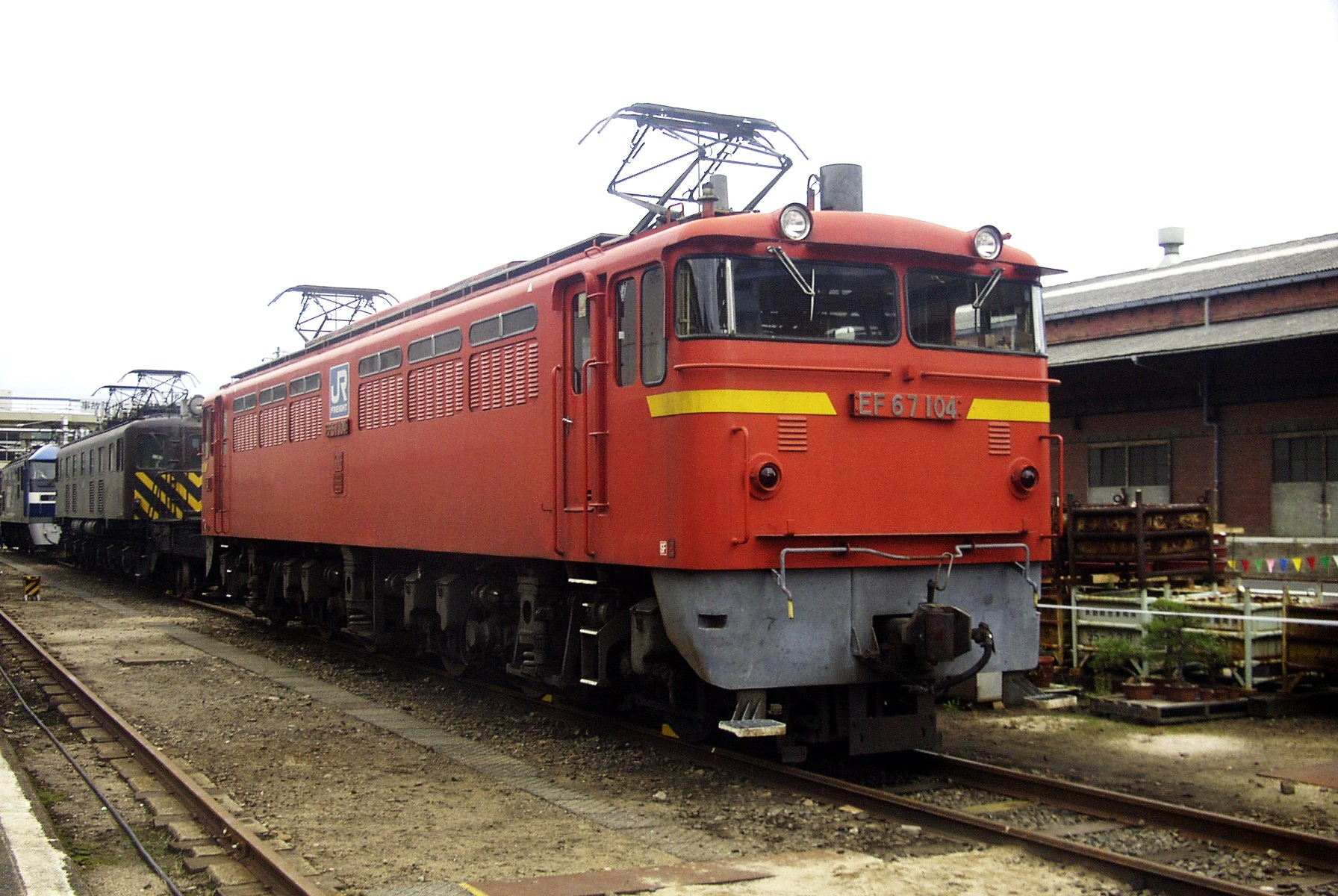
Number 2 end of unrefurbished EF67 104 in October 2002

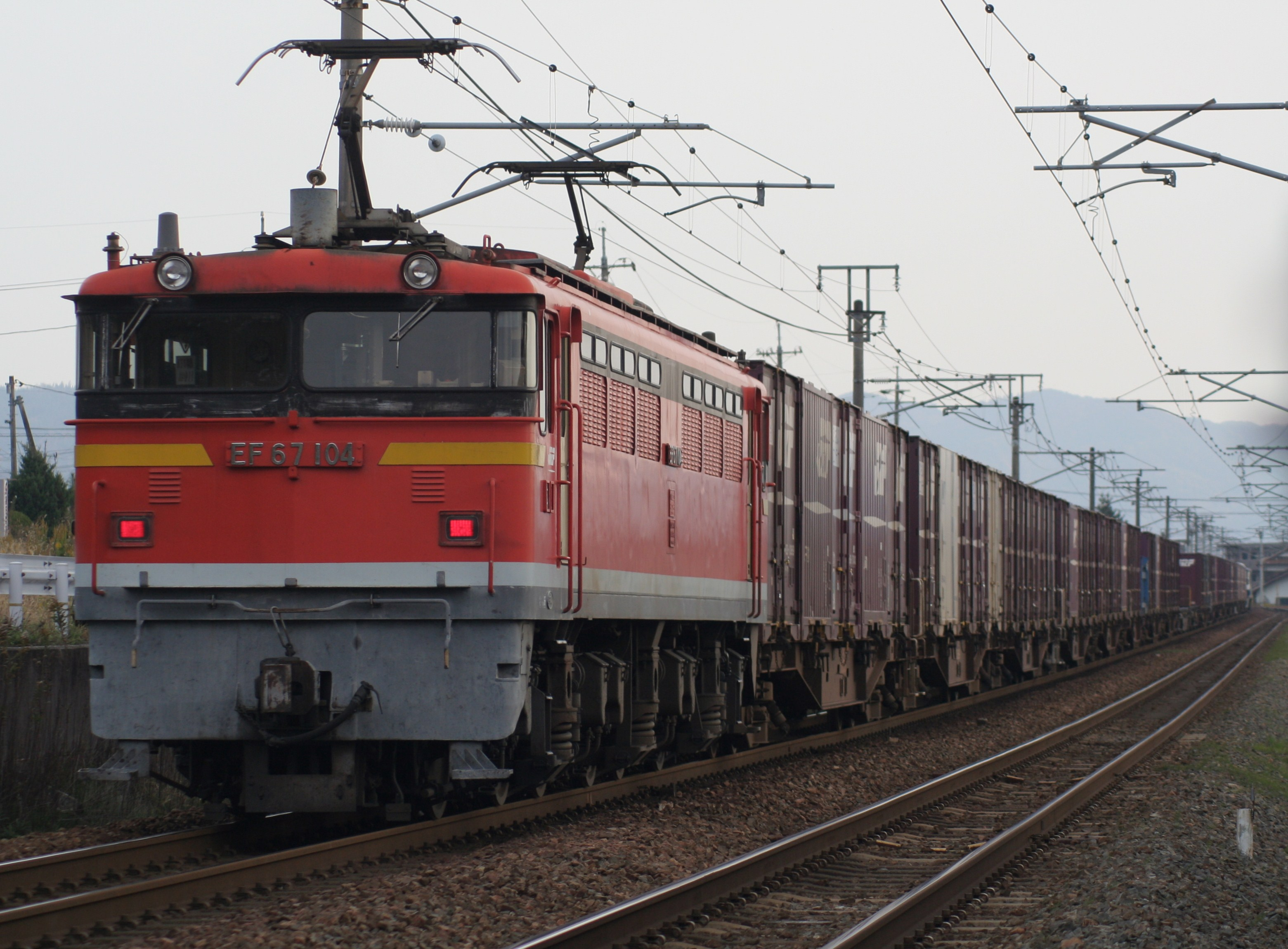
Refurbished EF67 104 at the rear of a freight train in November 2009

== See also ==
- Japan Railways locomotive numbering and classification
