= JNR Class EF60 =

Japanese electric locomotive class

Class EF60
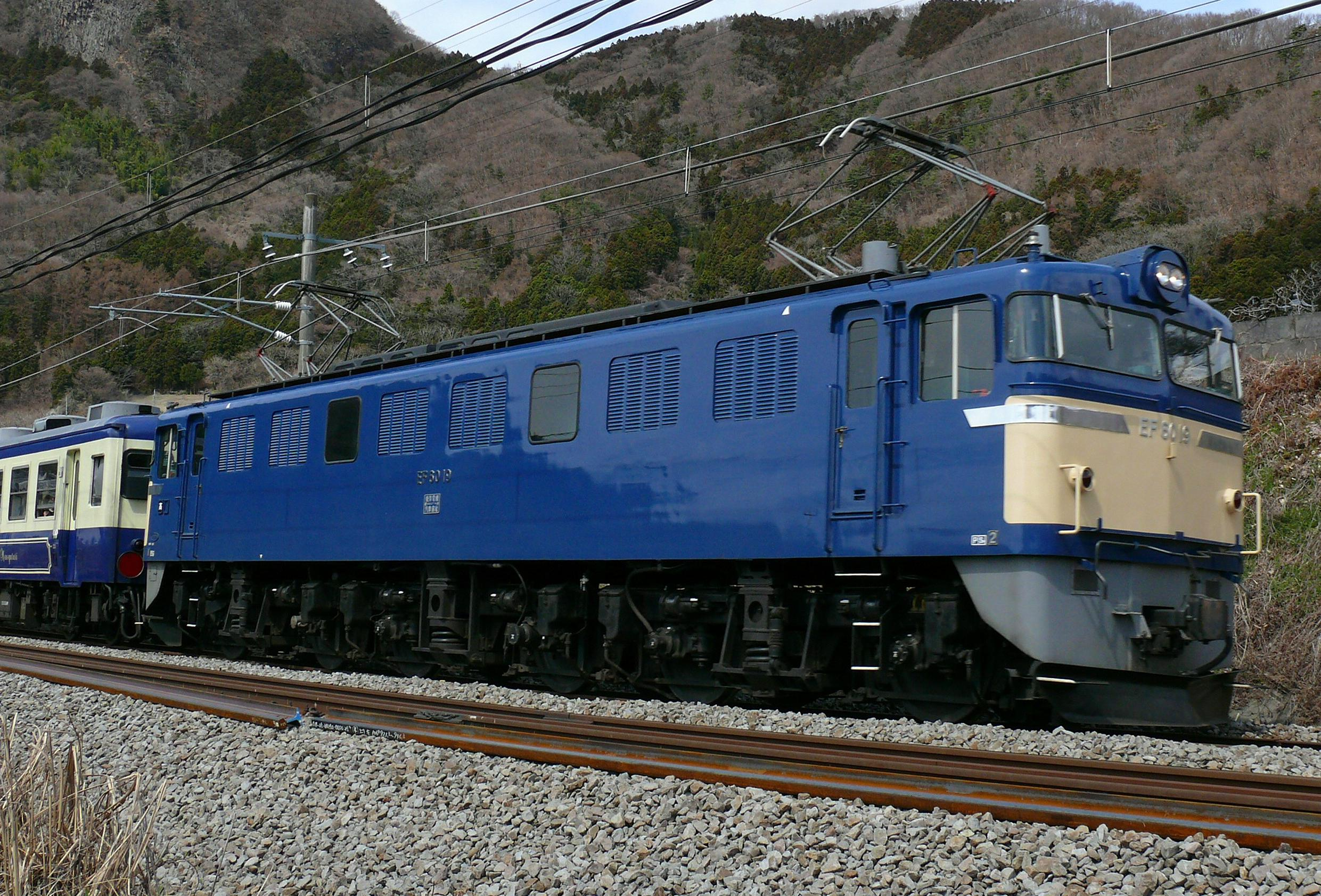
- Sole operational EF60 (EF60 19) on an excursion working, March 2008
Type and origin
- Power type: Electric
- Builder: Kawasaki, Mitsubishi, Toshiba, Tōyō & Kisha Seizō
- Build date: 1960–1964
- Number rebuilt: 143
Specifications
- Configuration
  - UIC: Bo-Bo-Bo
- Gauge: 1,067 mm (3 ft 6 in)
- Wheel diameter: 1,120 mm (44.09 in)
- Length: 16,500 mm (54 ft 1 5/8 in)
- Width: 2,800 mm (9 ft 2 1/4 in)
- Height: 3,960 mm (12 ft 11 7/8 in)
- Loco weight: 96 t (94 long tons; 106 short tons)
- Electric system/s: 1,500 V DC overhead line
- Current pickup: Pantograph
- MU working: Within Class Only
- Loco brake: Air and Electrical regenerative
- Train brakes: Air
- Safety systems: ATS-SF
Performance figures
- Maximum speed: 100 km/h (62 mph)
- Power output: EF60 15 onward: 2.55 MW (3,420 hp)
- Tractive effort: 23 tf (51,000 lbf)
Career
- Operators: JNR, JR East
- Disposition: 1 locomotive in service

The Class EF60 (EF60形) was the first Japanese second-generation DC electric locomotive type with six driven axles (classes EF60 to EF67), and the first versions used the same MT49 390 kW traction motors as the ED60 and ED61 designs. A total of 143 locomotives were built between 1960 and 1964 by Kawasaki, Tōshiba, Tōyō & Kisha Seizō, and Mitsubishi. The class was split between 129 freight locomotives (classified EF60-0) designed to supersede the mammoth EH10s on Tōkaidō and Sanyō Main Line freight, and 14 passenger locomotives (EF60-500) to replace EF58s on sleeping car trains on the Tōkaidō and Sanyō Mainlines.

The third-batch build of locos (EF60 84 to 129 and EF60 512 to 514) had up-rated traction motors and differed slightly in having twin headlamps (like the EF65 and other later types) rather than the single large headlamp on earlier versions. Unlike the ED60s, these locos were designed to operate singly rather than in pairs, and so cab-end gangway doors were not included. The EF60-0s initially appeared in the standard all-over brown livery, but were repainted into blue from 1965 onward.

The role of the EF60-500s at the head of the premier Blue Trains was short-lived, however, with the arrival of more powerful EF65s in 1965, and they too found themselves transferred to freight duties. From the late 1970s, EF60s were to be seen on the Chūō, Takasaki, and Ryōmō Lines in the Kantō region, and some locos were transferred to the Hanwa Line and Kisei Mainline in the Kansai region from the mid-1980s.

Withdrawals commenced in the 1980s, and all members of the class were withdrawn from regular operations in 1986, ahead of privatization. Two locos survived into JR days: EF60 19 owned by JR East for special event use, and EF60 503 by JR West. Eight early-built locos were converted to EF61-200s between 1977 and 1979 for use as bankers on the steeply-graded "Senohachi" section of the Sanyō Mainline between Seno and Hachihonmatsu. Three more later-built EF60s were more extensively rebuilt in 1982 to become EF67 class banking locos (numbers EF67 1 to 3) for use on the same section.

== Build details ==
Numbers	Batch	Built	Details
1-2	Prototype	1960	Different bogie designs. 390 kW MT49 traction motors.
3-14	1st	1960–	Based on EF60 1 design. Built with quill drive.
15-83	2nd	1962–1964	Nose-suspended traction motors (425 kW MT54).
84-129	3rd	1964–	Twin sealed-beam headlights. Bodyside louvres and windows similar to EF65.
501-511	2nd	1963–1964	Delivered in tokkyū blue livery.
512-514	3rd	1964	Twin sealed-beam headlights. Bodyside louvres and windows similar to EF65.

== Banker conversions ==
=== EF61-200 conversions ===
Eight Class EF60 locomotives were converted between 1977 and 1979 to become Class EF61-200 banking locomotives for use on the "Senohachi" section of the Sanyo Main Line.

Original number	Built	Later number	Rebuilt
EF60 1	22 January 1960	EF61 201	25 November 1977
EF60 3	27 July 1960	EF61 203	27 June 1978
EF60 4	10 August 1960	EF61 204	23 June 1978
EF60 6	13 September 1960	EF61 206	22 February 1979
EF60 7	28 September 1960	EF61 207	27 February 1979
EF60 9	13 July 1960	EF61 209	6 February 1978
EF60 10	30 July 1960	EF61 210	1 December 1977
EF60 11	20 August 1960	EF61 211	10 February 1978

=== EF67 conversions ===
Three Class EF60 locomotives were converted between 1982 and 1986 to become Class EF67 banking locomotives for use on the "Senohachi" section of the Sanyo Main Line.

Original number	Built	Later number	Rebuilt
EF60 88	9 July 1964	EF67 3	25 December 1986
EF60 104	30 September 1964	EF67 1	31 March 1982
EF60 129	27 October 1964	EF67 2	30 January 1984

== Preserved examples ==
- EF60 19 Preserved at JR East's Takasaki Depot in operating condition (occasional mainline use), repainted in 2007 into standard blue/cream livery (previously special white livery with blue/red stripes)
- EF60 47 No. 2 cab section only, on display inside JR East's Ōmiya Works, brown livery
- EF60 123 Plinthed in front of Ashikaga Station (JR Ryōmō Line), standard blue livery
- EF60 501 Usui Pass Railway Heritage Park, Gunma, in tokkyū blue livery
- EF60 503 Formerly preserved at JR West's Miyahara Depot (cut up November 2008)
- EF60 510 Preserved at JR East's Ōmiya Works in tokkyū blue livery
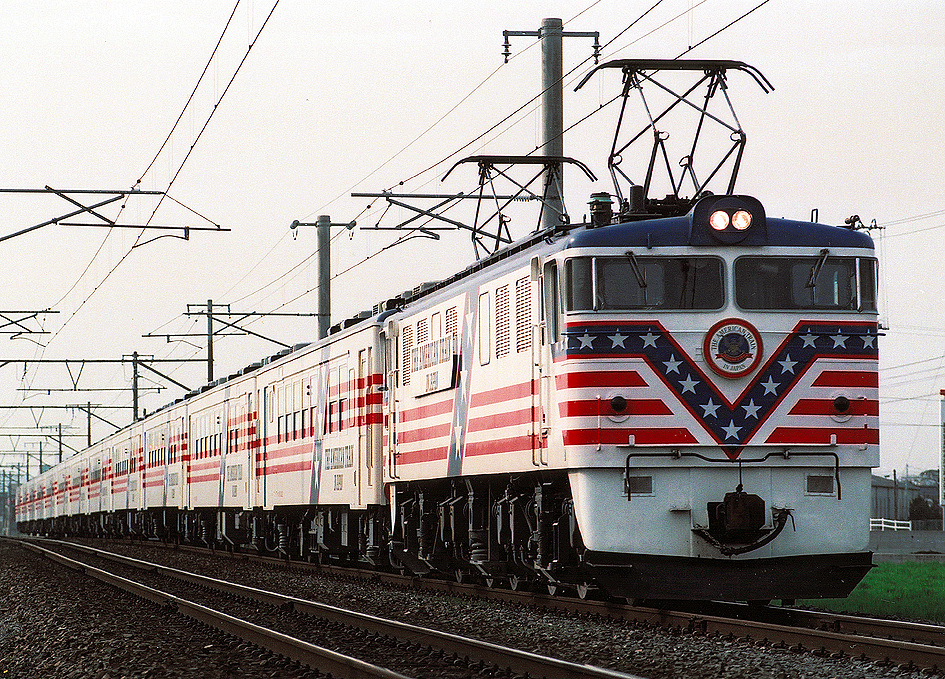
EF60 19 in "American Train" livery in 1988

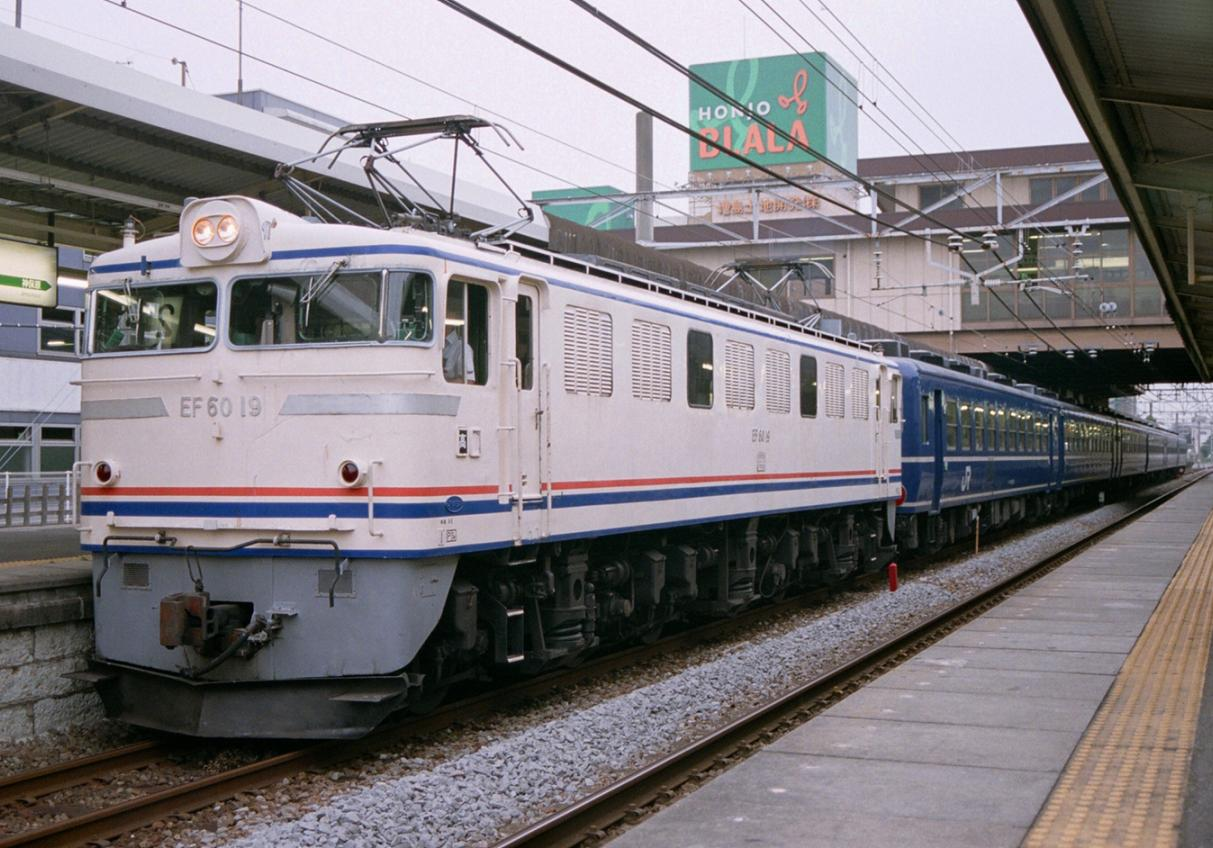
EF60 19 in "Yasuragi" Joyful Train livery in September 2005

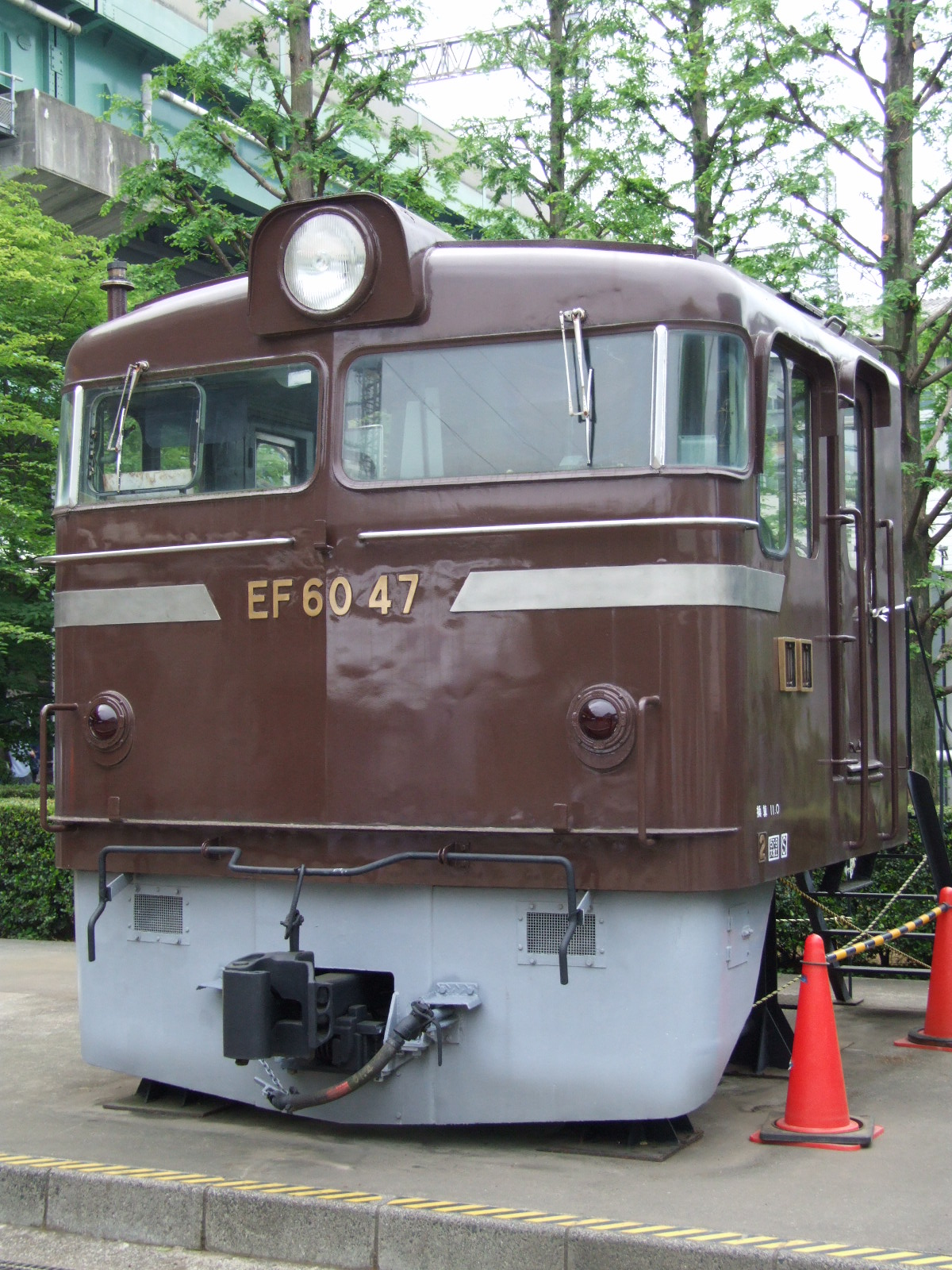
Cab end of EF60 47 inside JR East Omiya Works in May 2008

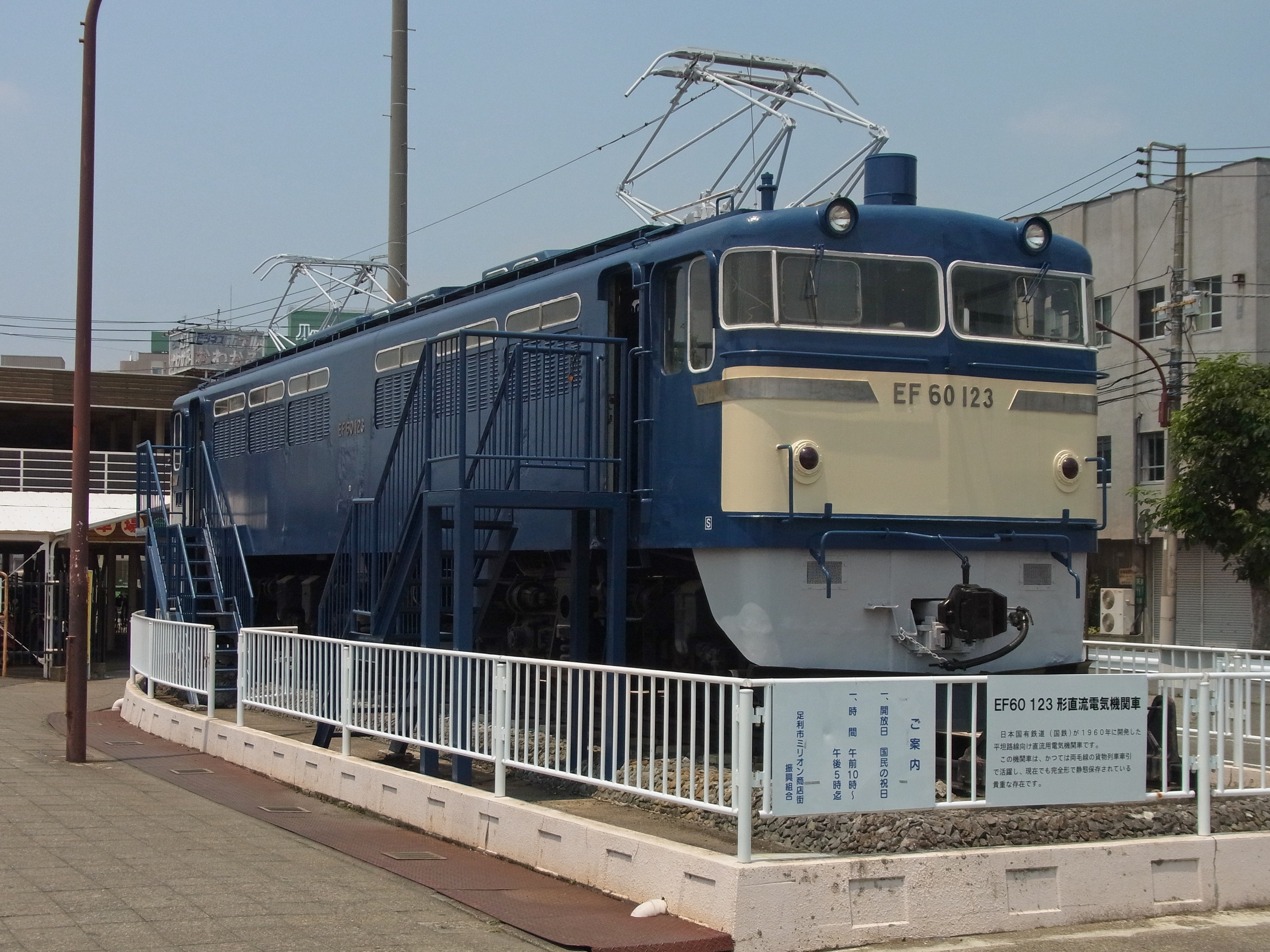
Preserved EF60 123 in front of Ashikaga Station in June 2013

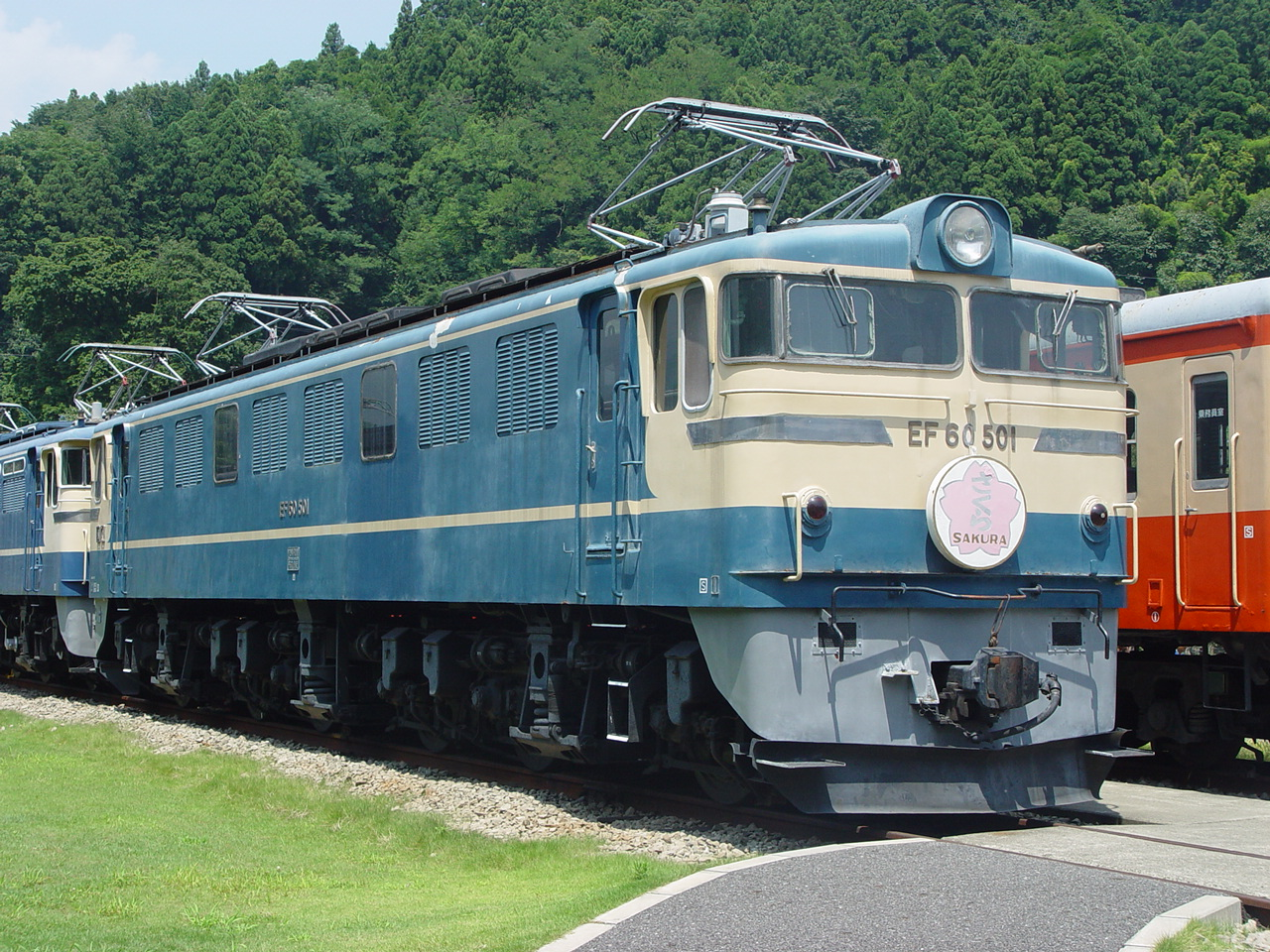
EF60 501 at the Usui Pass Railway Heritage Park in August 2004

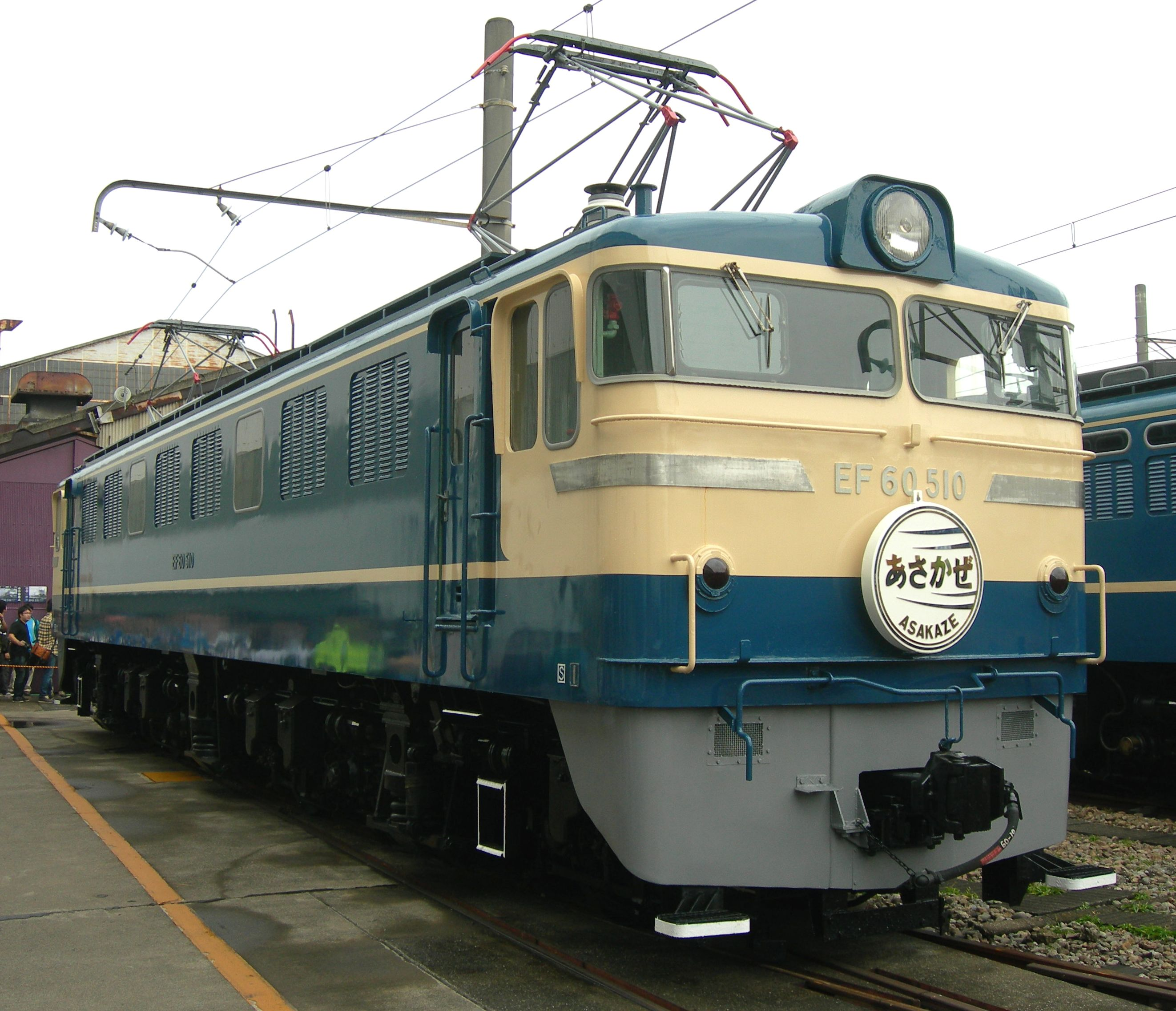
Preserved EF60 510 at Omiya Works open day in October 2011

== See also ==
- Japan Railways locomotive numbering and classification
