= Monorails in Japan =

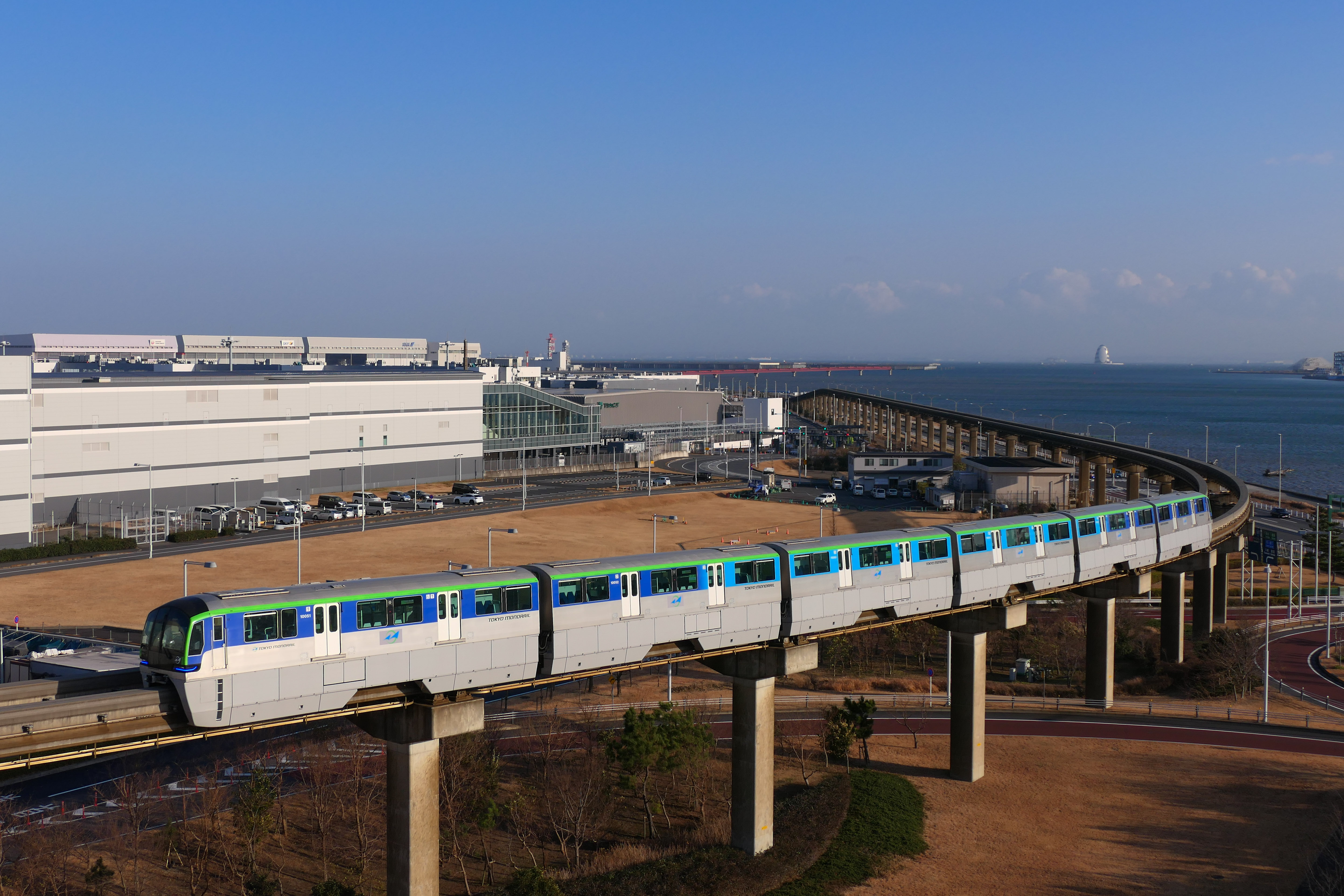
Tokyo Monorail

Here is a list of monorails in Japan.

== Currently operational ==
Photo	Operator	Line (s)	Type	Total length (km)	Year opened	Prefecture
	Tokyo Monorail	Tokyo Monorail Haneda Airport Line (Tokyo Panorama Line)	Japanese Straddle	17.8	1964	Tokyo
	Tokyo Tama Intercity Monorail	Tama Toshi Monorail Line	Japanese Straddle	16.0	1998	Tokyo
	Chiba Urban Monorail	Chiba Urban Monorail Line 1 Chiba Urban Monorail Line 2	SAFEGE	15.2	1988 (Line 2); 1995 (Line 1)	Chiba
	Maihama Resort Line	Disney Resort Line	Japanese Straddle	5.0	2001	Chiba
	Shonan Monorail	Shonan Monorail Enoshima Line	SAFEGE	6.6	1970	Kanagawa
	Osaka Monorail	Osaka Monorail Main Line; Osaka Monorail Saito Line	Japanese Straddle	21.2; 6.8	1990; 1998	Osaka; Hyōgo
	Kitakyushu Urban Monorail	Kitakyushu Monorail Kokura Line	Japanese Straddle	8.8	1985	Fukuoka
	Okinawa Urban Monorail	Okinawa Urban Monorail Line (Yui Rail)	Japanese Straddle	17.0	2003	Okinawa

== Discontinued ==
- Nagoya Municipal Nagoya City Higashiyama Park Monorail Line Monorail, Nagoya, Aichi, 1964 — 1974.
- Himeji City Monorail Line, Himeji, Hyōgo, 1965 — 1974.
- Meitetsu Monkey Park Monorail Line: Inuyama, Aichi, 1962–2008. It linked the Monkey Park to the nearest railway station.
- Nara Dreamland Monorail, Nara Dreamland, 1961 — 2006
- Odakyū Mukōgaoka-Yūen Monorail Line, Kawasaki, Kanagawa, 1965 — 2001.
- "Suspended Train" at the Exhibition of Transportation and Electricity in Osaka, 1928. Operated only for a week, from November 28 until December 3. It was the first monorail in the nation, as well as the only one in the pre-war period.
- Toei Ueno Zoo Monorail: Tokyo, 1958-2023. It linked the two sectors of the zoo in Ueno Park. Service was suspended on 31 October 2019 and permanently closed in December 2023.
- Yokohama Dreamland Monorail, Kanagawa, 1966 — 1967.
- Yomiuriland Monorail, Kanagawa and Tokyo, 1964 — 1978.
- Skyrail Midorizaka Line: Aki-ku, Hiroshima, Hiroshima, 1998 — 2024. (suspended monorail) A commuter line in a residential development suburb of the city. It was also considered as an automated guideway transit.

== Other monorails ==
- Slope cars are small automated monorails found in the various parts of Japan. Unlike the monorails above, slope cars are not legally considered as railways. Similar concepts include Raxcars and Monoriders.
- There are also small industrial monorails used in various places, most notably in steep orchards, especially of mikan citrus. The first of its kind was invented in 1966.
- Vista liner is another type of monorail which is not legally a railway. The system is smaller than ordinary monorails, but larger than slope cars. Vista liners can be typically seen in amusement parks, such as Expo Land.

== See also ==
- Monorail
- List of railway companies in Japan
- List of railway lines in Japan
- Slope car
