= Skyrail Midorizaka Line =

Former monorail line in Japan

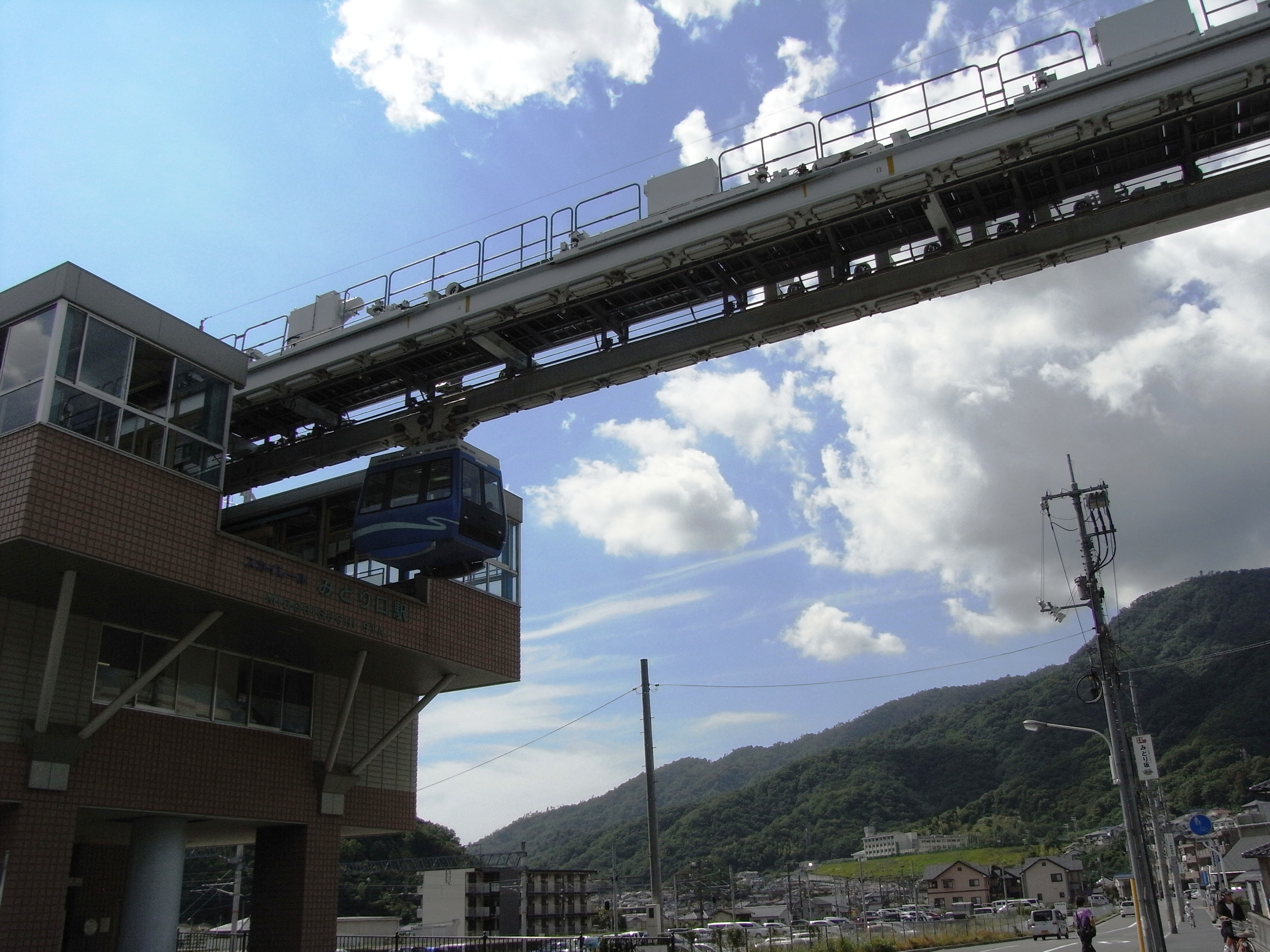

Overview
- Other name: Hiroshima Short Distance Transit Seno Line
- Native name: スカイレールみどり坂線 （広島短距離交通瀬野線）
- Stations: 3

Service
- Type: Suspended monorail
- Operator: Skyrail Service (スカイレールサービス)
- Rolling stock: 200 series

History
- Opened: 28 August 1998
- Closed: 30 April 2024

Technical
- Line length: 1.3 km (0.81 mi)
- Num of tracks: 2
- Character: Elevated
- Electrification: 440 V DC
- Signalling: Linear motor
- Highest elevation: 180 m (590 ft)

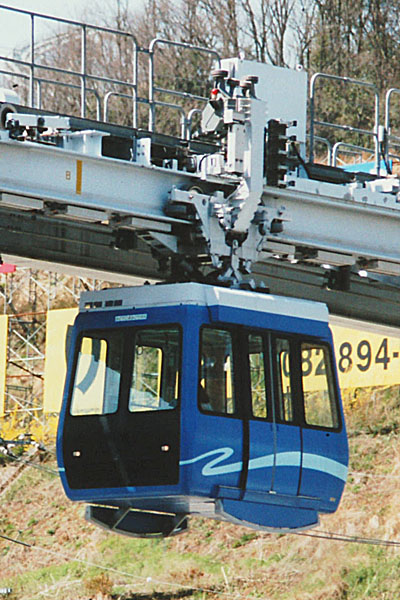
200 series vehicles, which operated on Skyrail's route since day one. Each vehicle holds up to 25 passengers.

The Skyrail Midorizaka Line (スカイレールみどり坂線, Sukairēru Midorizaka-sen) was a monorail/people mover line operated by Skyrail Service. The line ran between Midoriguchi and Midori-Chūō, all within the new town called Skyrail Town Midorizaka, located in Aki, Hiroshima, Hiroshima Prefecture, Japan. The line was officially called the Hiroshima Short Distance Transit Seno Line (広島短距離交通瀬野線, Hiroshima Tankyori Kōtsū Seno-sen).

The line was the first Japanese public transport system to introduce a smart card, simply called IC Commuter Pass (IC定期券, Ai Shī Teikiken) and branded with the words "SKYRAIL PASS", which launched along with the line's opening in 1998.

== History ==
The line opened on 28 August 1998, with a total construction cost of approximately ¥6.2 billion.

Skyrail Service announced on 5 November 2022 that the line would be closed by the end of 2023 due to profitability concerns, and that electric buses operated by Geiyo Bus would operate as a replacement, with a route providing greater coverage across the community. The closure was later postponed to spring 2024.

Skyrail ended operations at noon on 30 April 2024, and the company dissolved the following day.

== Technology ==
The line used a unique "Skyrail" rail transport system developed mainly by Kobe Steel and Mitsubishi Heavy Industries. It was a fusion between a suspended monorail and an aerial lift (ropeway). Driverless gondola-sized cars, suspended from a single steel track, were moved by an attached cable. Inside each station, cars released the cable and were moved by linear motors. The technology allowed the line to climb steep slopes of up to 14 degrees, while also being able to accommodate curves with a radius of up to 30 meters.

=== Rolling stock ===
The entire line used 200 series vehicles, which held up to 25 people. The operating speed was 15 km/h.

== Services ==
The line operated from around 6:30 a.m. to 10 p.m. daily, with cars that ran every 15 minutes during midday and late night, and every 5–10 minutes at peak morning and evening times. A night taxi provided services between 10 p.m. and midnight.

A one-way trip across the entire length of the line took five minutes. The fare was ¥170 for adults and could be paid with a QR code-scannable ticket (issued from a ticket machine) or Skyrail-specific smart card.

== Stations ==
All the stations on the line are elevated, with two side platforms serving two tracks.

Name	Japanese	Coordinates	Distance (km)		Transfers
Name	Japanese	Coordinates	Between stations	Total	Transfers
Midoriguchi	みどり口	34°25′19.9″N 132°35′46.8″E	-	0	G Sanyo Main Line (Seno Station)
Midori-Nakamachi	みどり中街	34°25′40″N 132°35′42″E	0.7	0.7	
Midori-Chūō	みどり中央	34°25′49″N 132°35′22″E	0.6	1.3	

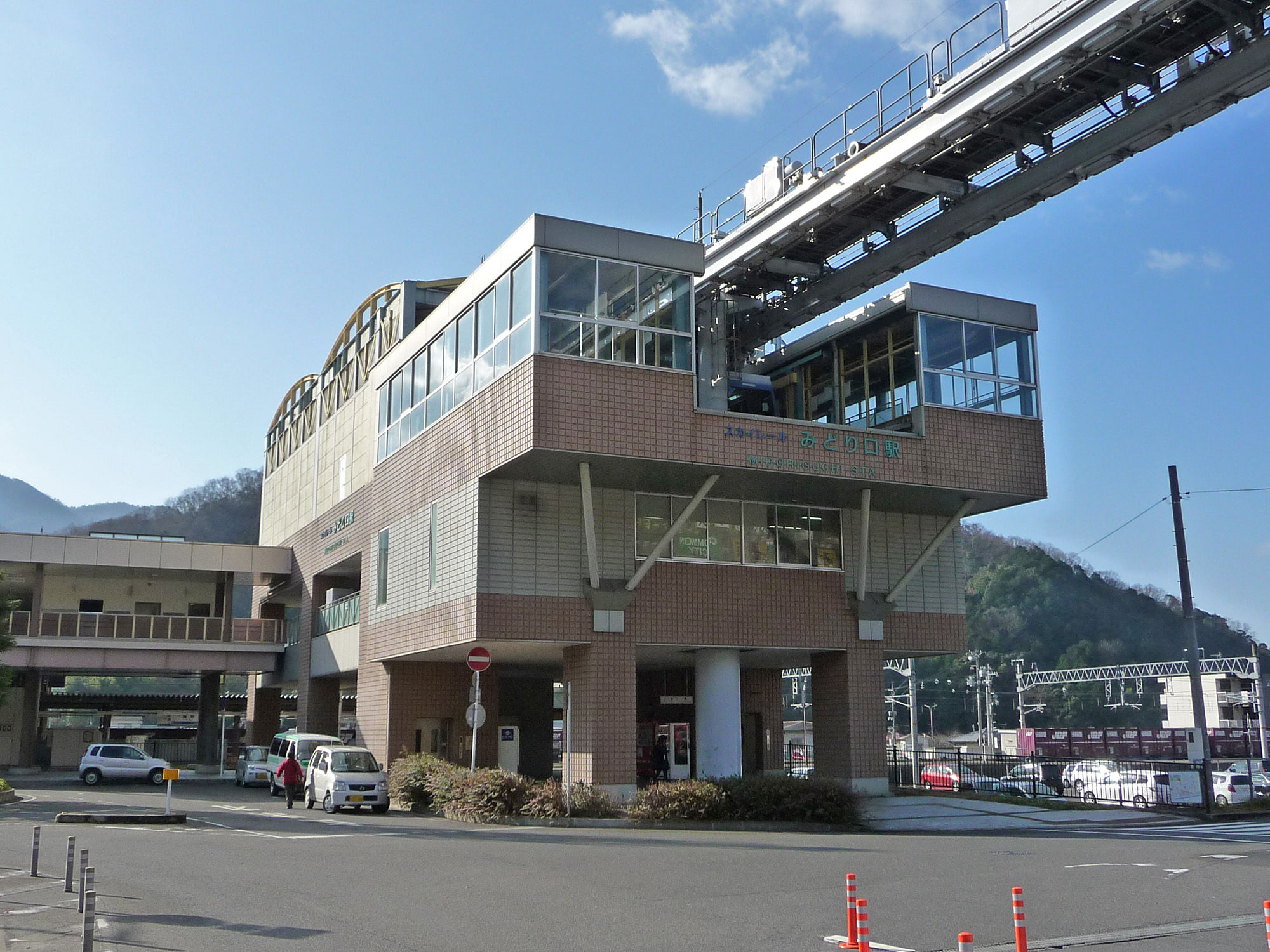
Midoriguchi station

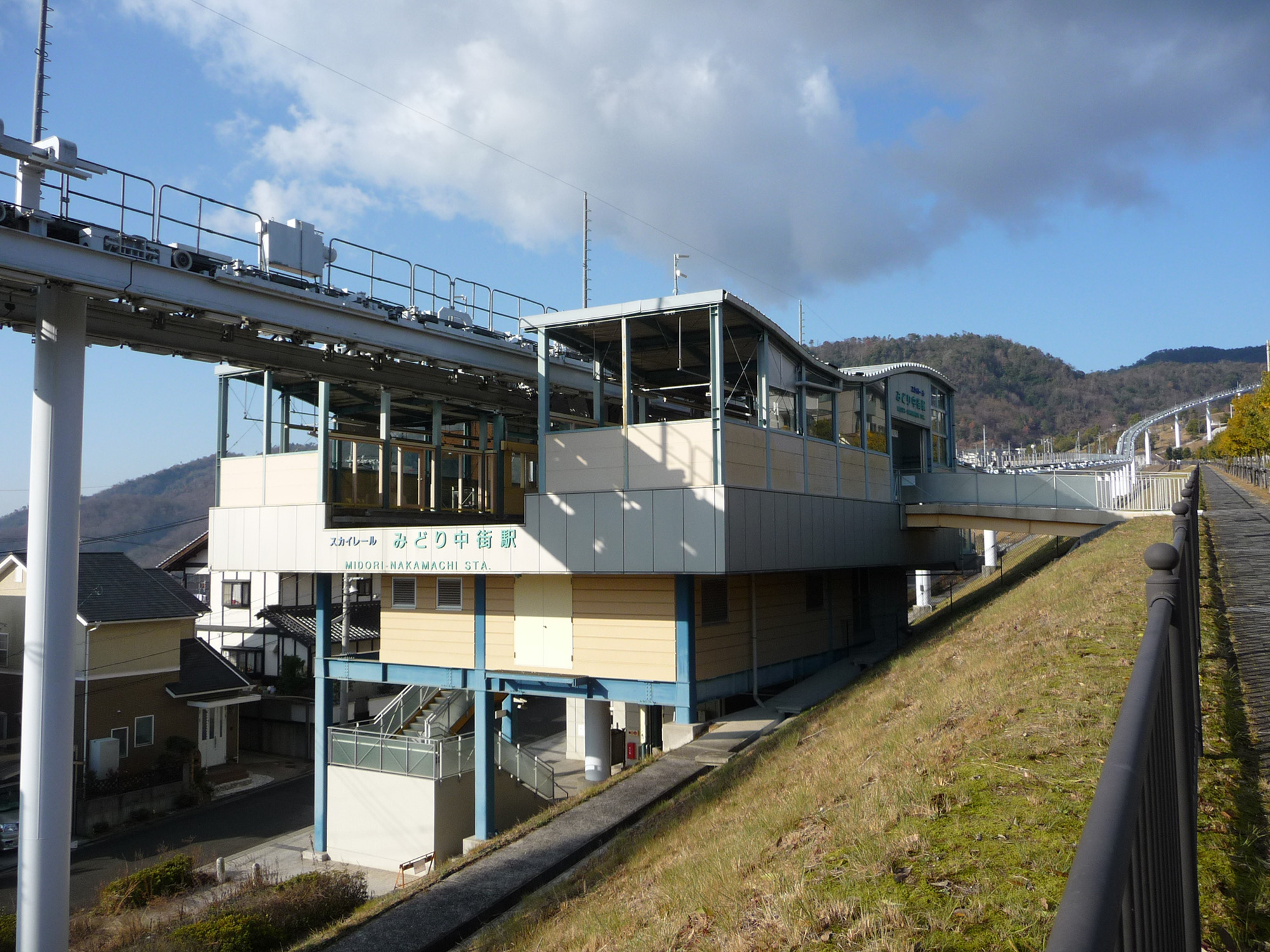
Midori-Nakamachi station

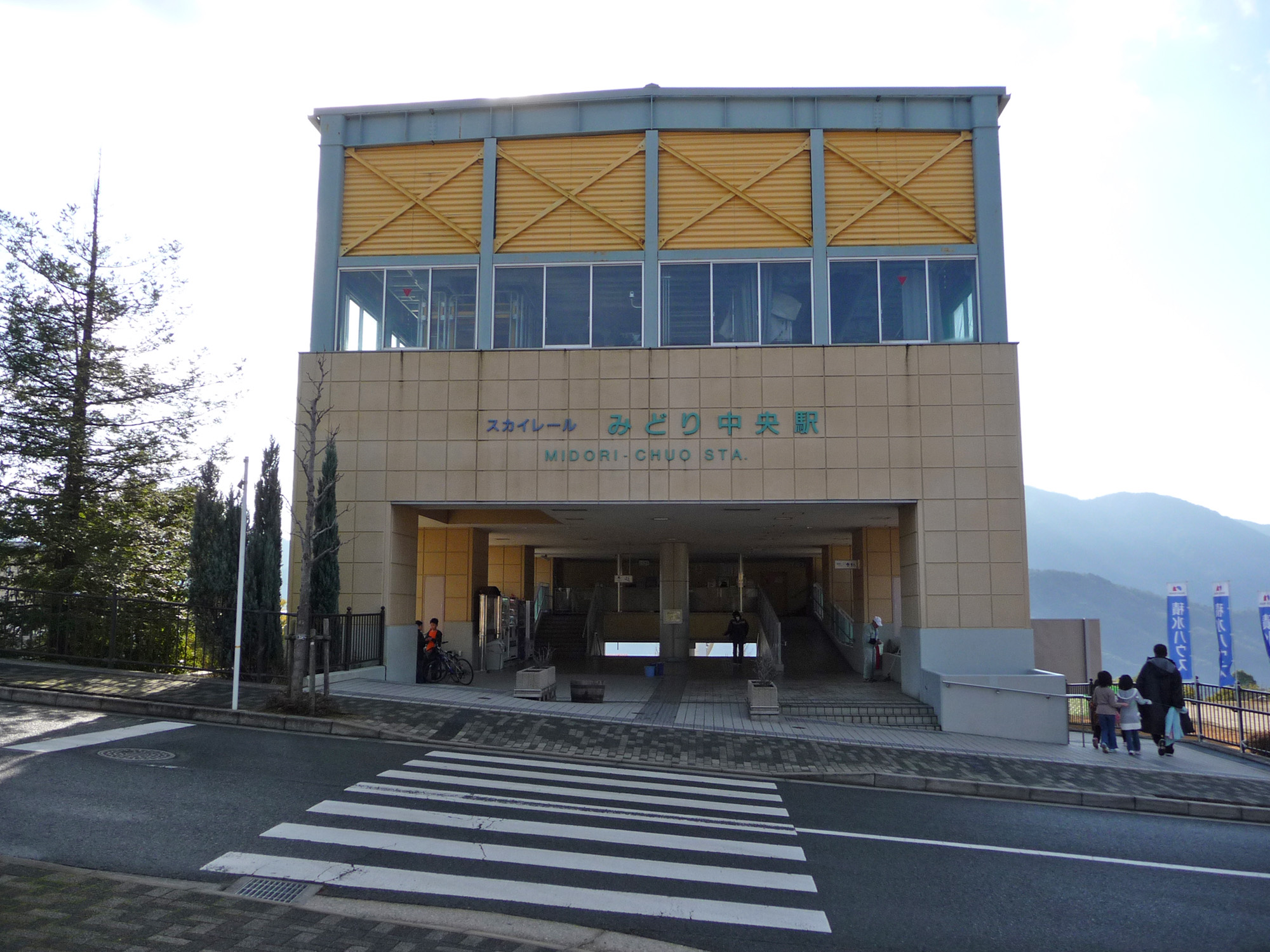
Midori-Chūō station

== See also ==
- List of railway lines in Japan
- Monorails in Japan
- People mover
- Automated guideway transit
