= Aki-Nakano Station =

Railway station in Aki-ku, Hiroshima, Japan

Aki-Nakano Station 安芸中野駅
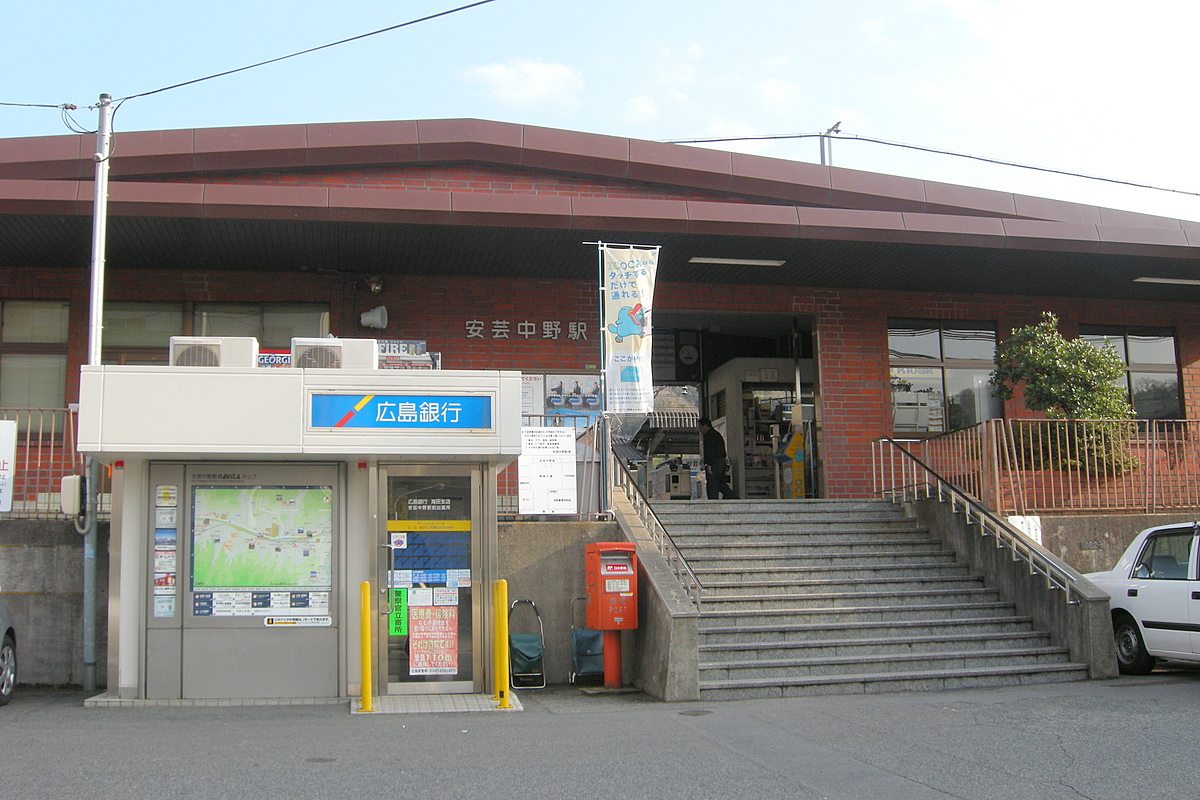
- Aki-Nakano Station in February 2009

General information
- Location: 2-chōme-2 Nakano, Aki-ku, Hiroshima-shi, Hiroshima-ken 739-0321; Japan
- Coordinates: 34°23′27.83″N 132°33′47.83″E
- Owner: West Japan Railway Company
- Operator: West Japan Railway Company
- Line: G Sanyō Main Line
- Distance: 294.4 km (182.9 miles) from Kobe
- Platforms: 2 side platforms
- Tracks: 2
- Connections: Bus stop

Construction
- Accessible: Yes

Other information
- Status: Staffed (Midori no Madoguchi )
- Station code: JR-G05
- Website: Official website

History
- Opened: 15 August 1920

Passengers
- FY2019: 2945

Services
Preceding station	JR West	Following station
Kaitaichi towards Hiroshima	San'yō Line Local	Nakanohigashi towards Itozaki
Location
- Location within Hiroshima Prefecture Location within Japan

Aki-Nakano Station (安芸中野駅, Aki-Nakano-eki) is a passenger railway station located in Aki-ku in the city of Hiroshima, Hiroshima Prefecture, Japan. It is operated by the West Japan Railway Company (JR West).

== Lines ==
Aki-Nakano Station is served by the JR West Sanyō Main Line, and is located 294.4 kilometers from the terminus of the line at Kobe.

== Station layout ==
The station consists of one side platform and one island platform. The station building is adjacent to the side platform and is connected to the island platform by a footbridge. The station has a Midori no Madoguchi staffed ticket office.

== Platforms ==
1	■ G Sanyō Main Line	for Saijō and Mihara
2, 3	■ G Sanyō Main Line	for Hiroshima and Iwakuni

== History ==
Aki-Nakano Station opened as a signal stop on 13 July 1913 and was elevated to a full station on 15 August 1920.

== Passenger statistics ==
In fiscal 2019, the station was used by an average of 2945 passengers daily.

== Surrounding area ==
- Japan National Route 2
- Senogawa Hospital
- Aki Ward Nakano Branch Office
- Hiroshima Municipal Senogawa Junior High School

== See also ==
- List of railway stations in Japan
