= Nakanohigashi Station =

Railway station in Aki-ku, Hiroshima, Japan

Nakanohigashi Station 中野東駅
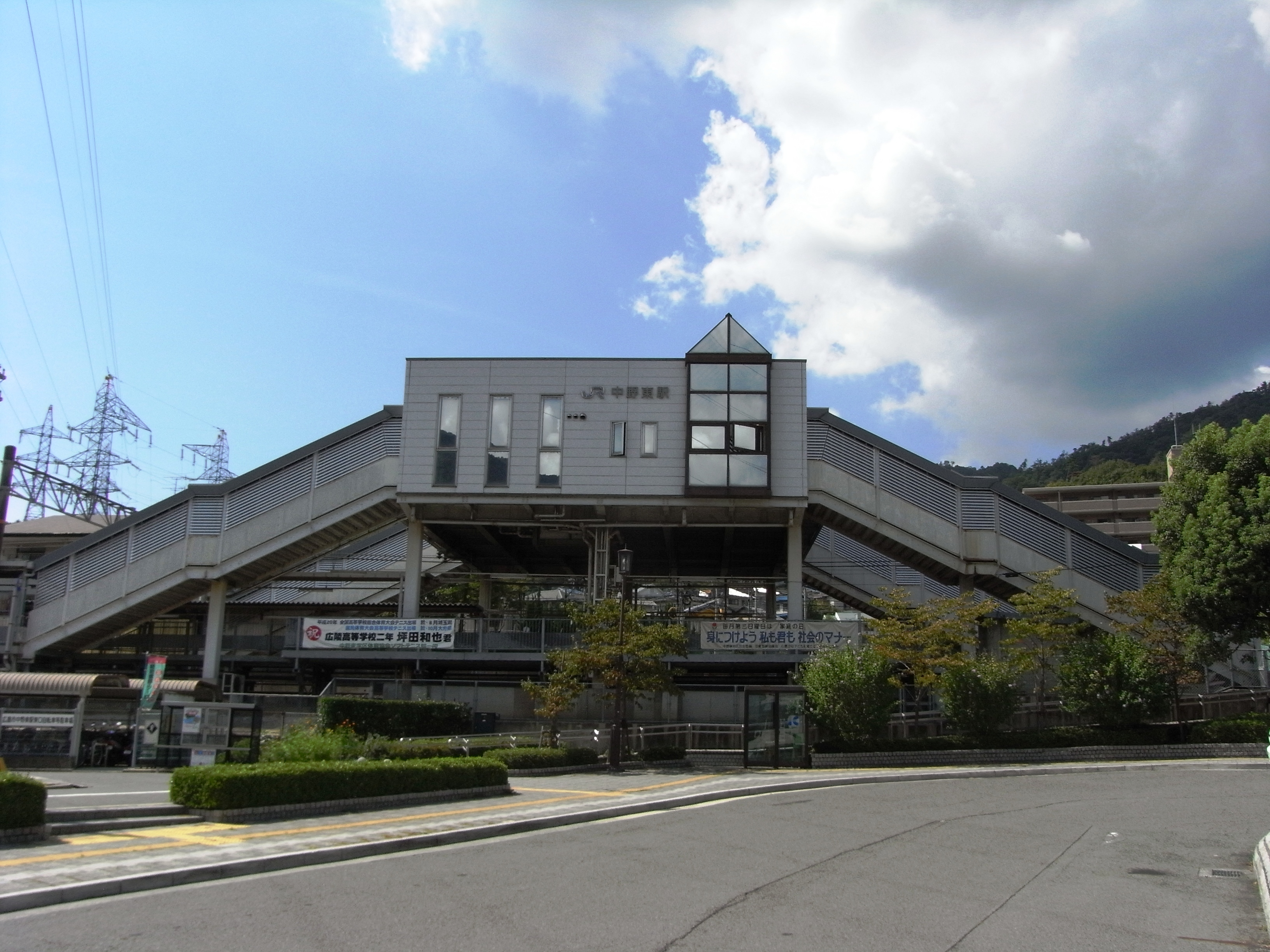
- Nakanohigashi Station east exit in September 2008

General information
- Location: 5-chōme-21 Nakano, Aki-ku, Hiroshima-shi, Hiroshima-ken, 739-0321; Japan
- Coordinates: 34°24′14.1″N 132°34′44.1″E
- Owner: West Japan Railway Company
- Operator: West Japan Railway Company
- Line: G Sanyō Main Line
- Distance: 292.4 km (181.7 miles) from Kobe
- Platforms: 2 side platforms
- Tracks: 2
- Connections: Bus stop

Construction
- Structure type: At-grade
- Accessible: Yes

Other information
- Status: Staffed (Midori no Madoguchi)
- Station code: JR-G06
- Website: Official website

History
- Opened: 11 August 1989

Passengers
- FY2019: 2701

Services
Preceding station	JR West	Following station
Aki-Nakano towards Hiroshima	San'yō Line Local	Seno towards Itozaki
Location
- Location within Hiroshima Prefecture Location within Japan

Nakanohigashi Station (中野東駅, Nakanohigashi-eki) is a passenger railway station located in Aki-ku in the city of Hiroshima, Hiroshima Prefecture, Japan. It is operated by the West Japan Railway Company (JR West).

== Lines ==
Nakanohigashi Station is served by the JR West Sanyō Main Line, and is located 292.4 kilometers from the terminus of the line at Kobe.

== Station layout ==
The station consists of two opposed side platforms connected by an elevated station building. The station has a Midori no Madoguchi staffed ticket office.

== Platforms ==
1	■ G Sanyō Main Line	for Hiroshima and Iwakuni
2	■ G Sanyō Main Line	for Saijō and Mihara

== History ==
Nakanohigashi Station opened on 11 August 1989.

== Passenger statistics ==
In fiscal 2019, the station was used by an average of 2701 passengers daily.

== Surrounding area ==
- Hiroshima Kokusai Gakuin University Nakano Campus
- Hiroshima Municipal Senogawa Junior High School
- Aki Ward Office Nakano Branch Officeol

== See also ==
- List of railway stations in Japan
