= JR Freight Class EF210 =

Japanese Bo-Bo-Bo wheel arrangement DC freight locomotive type

Class EF210
- JR Freight EF210 electric locomotive EF210-117 in January 2019
Type and origin
- Power type: Electric
- Builder: Kawasaki Heavy Industries; Mitsubishi Electric
- Build date: 1996–present
Specifications
- Configuration
  - UIC: Bo′Bo′Bo′
- Gauge: 1,067 mm (3 ft 6 in)
- Length: 18,200 mm (59 ft 8 1/2 in)
- Width: 2,887 mm (9 ft 5 5/8 in)
- Height: 3,980 mm (13 ft 3/4 in)
- Loco weight: 100.8 t (99.2 long tons; 111.1 short tons)
- Electric system/s: 1,500 V DC overhead wire
- Current pickup: Pantograph
- Traction motors: AC
- Transmission: Electric
Performance figures
- Maximum speed: 110 km/h (70 mph)
- Power output: 3,390 kW (4,550 hp)
- Tractive effort: 199 kN (45,000 lbf)
Career
- Operators: JR Freight
- Number in class: 131
- First run: 1996
- Disposition: Operational

The Class EF210 (EF210形) is a Bo-Bo-Bo wheel arrangement DC electric locomotive type operated by Japan Freight Railway Company (JR Freight) on freight services in Japan.

The locomotives are built at the Kawasaki Heavy Industries factory in Kobe. Based at Okayama, Shin-Tsurumi, and Suita (Osaka) depots, they are primarily used on freight on the Tokaido Main Line and Sanyo Main Line, replacing Class EF66 locomotives.

As of 1 April 2026, 131 EF210s were operated by JR Freight, based at Shin-Tsurumi (Kawasaki), Suita (Osaka), and Okayama depots.

== Variants ==
- Class EF210-901, prototype
- Class EF210-0, full-production version
- Class EF210-100
- Class EF210-300

== EF210-901 ==
The pre-production prototype, EF210-901, was delivered to Shin-Tsurumi depot in 1996.

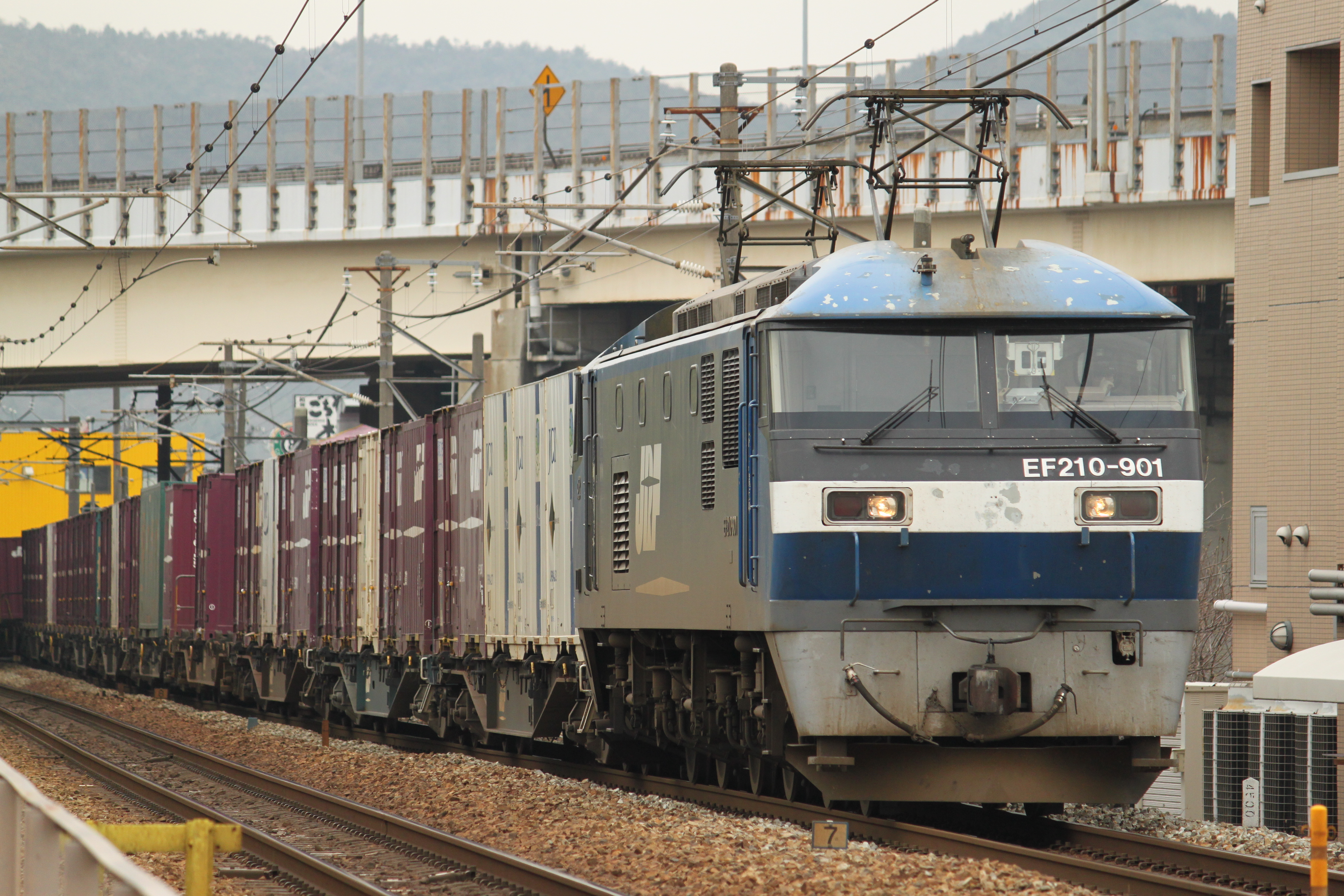
EF210-901 in March 2010

== EF210-0 full-production version ==
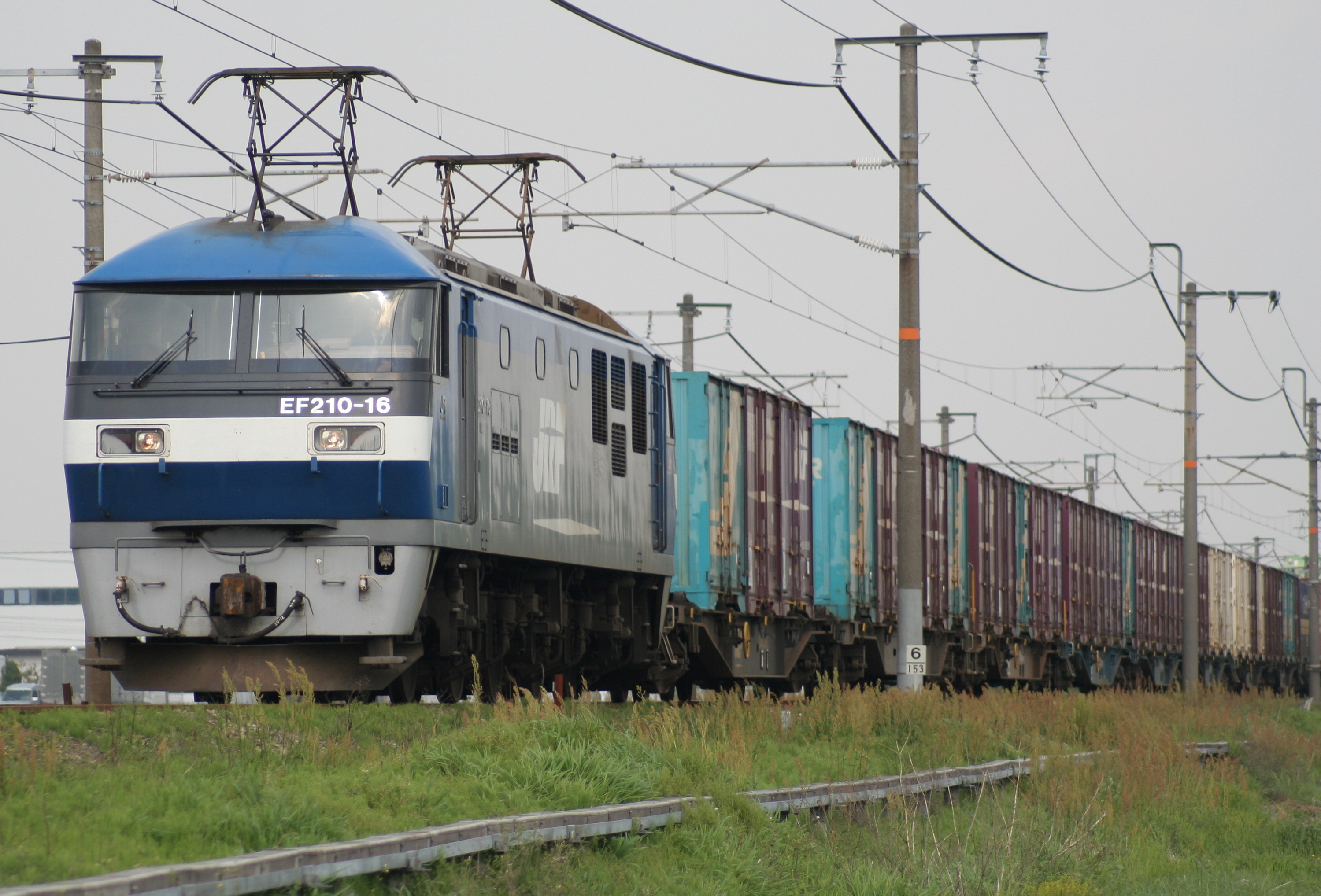
EF210-16 in April 2007

Following evaluation of the prototype version, the first full-production locomotive, EF210-1, was delivered to Okayama in July 1998. A number of minor improvements were incorporated, with the main external differences from the prototype being as follows.

- Traction motors changed from FMT3 (565 kW) to FMT4 type (565 kW)
- "ECO-POWER Momo Taro" logo on bodyside
- Reduced bogie size from 2,600 mm to 2,500 mm.

All 18 of the EF210-0s are allocated to Okayama Depot.

== EF210-100 ==
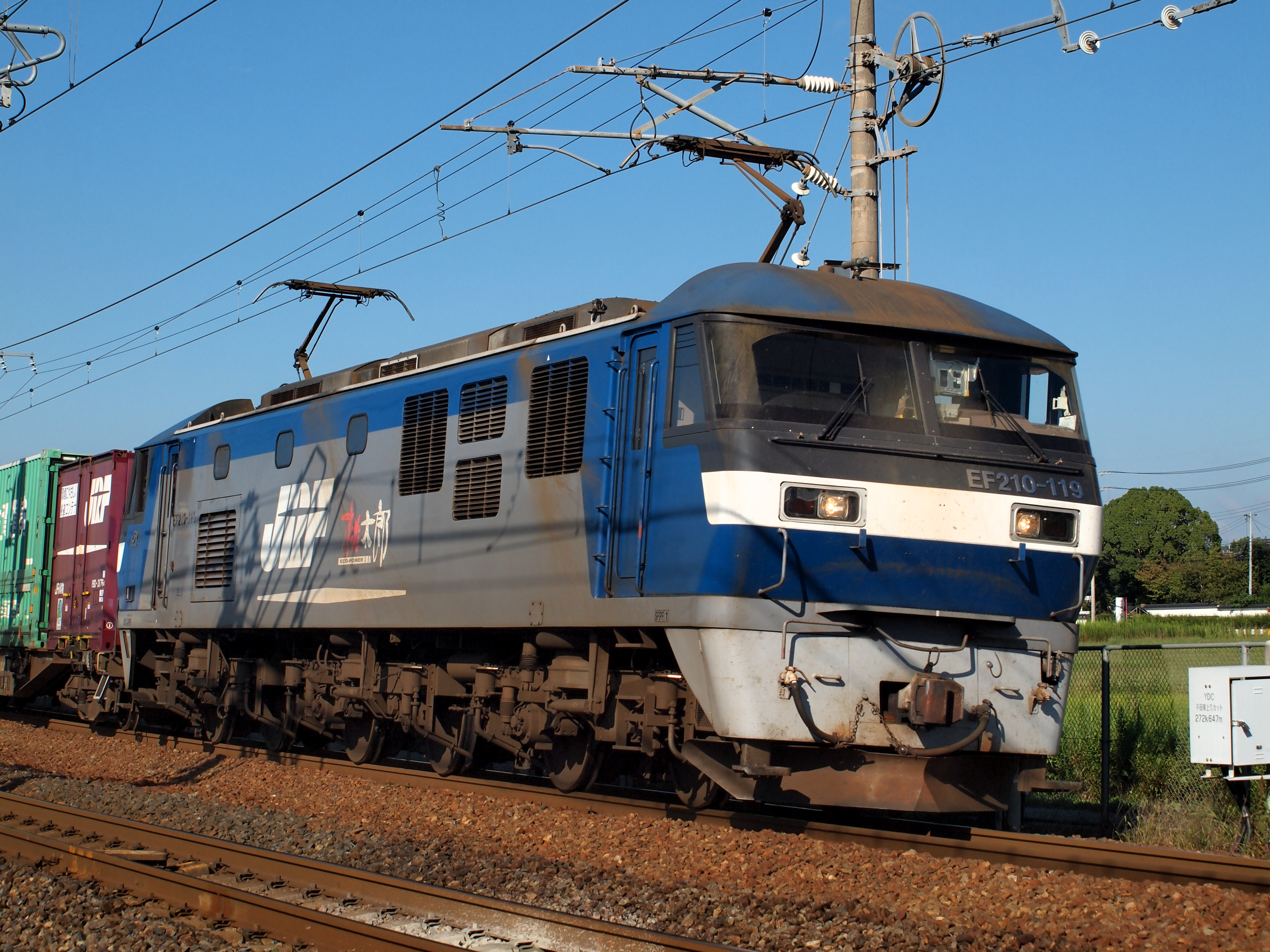
EF210-119 in September 2015

The EF210-100 sub-class incorporates a number of minor improvements, including the use of single-arm pantographs, and IGBT replacing GTO.

EF210-100s are based at Okayama, Shin-Tsurumi, and Suita (Osaka) depots, with 73 locomotives in operation as of 1 April 2016.

== EF210-300 ==
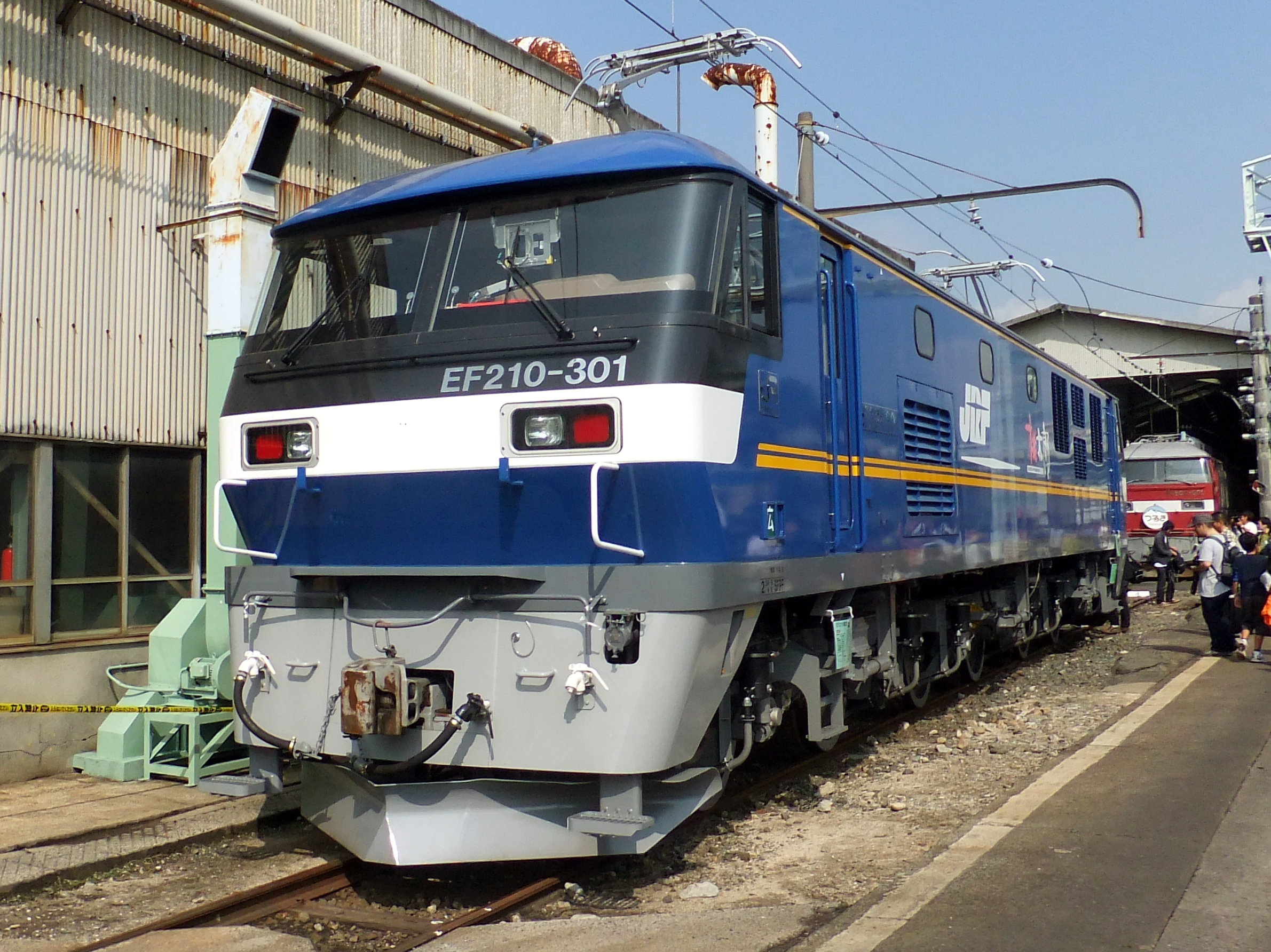
EF210-301 at Hiroshima Depot in October 2012

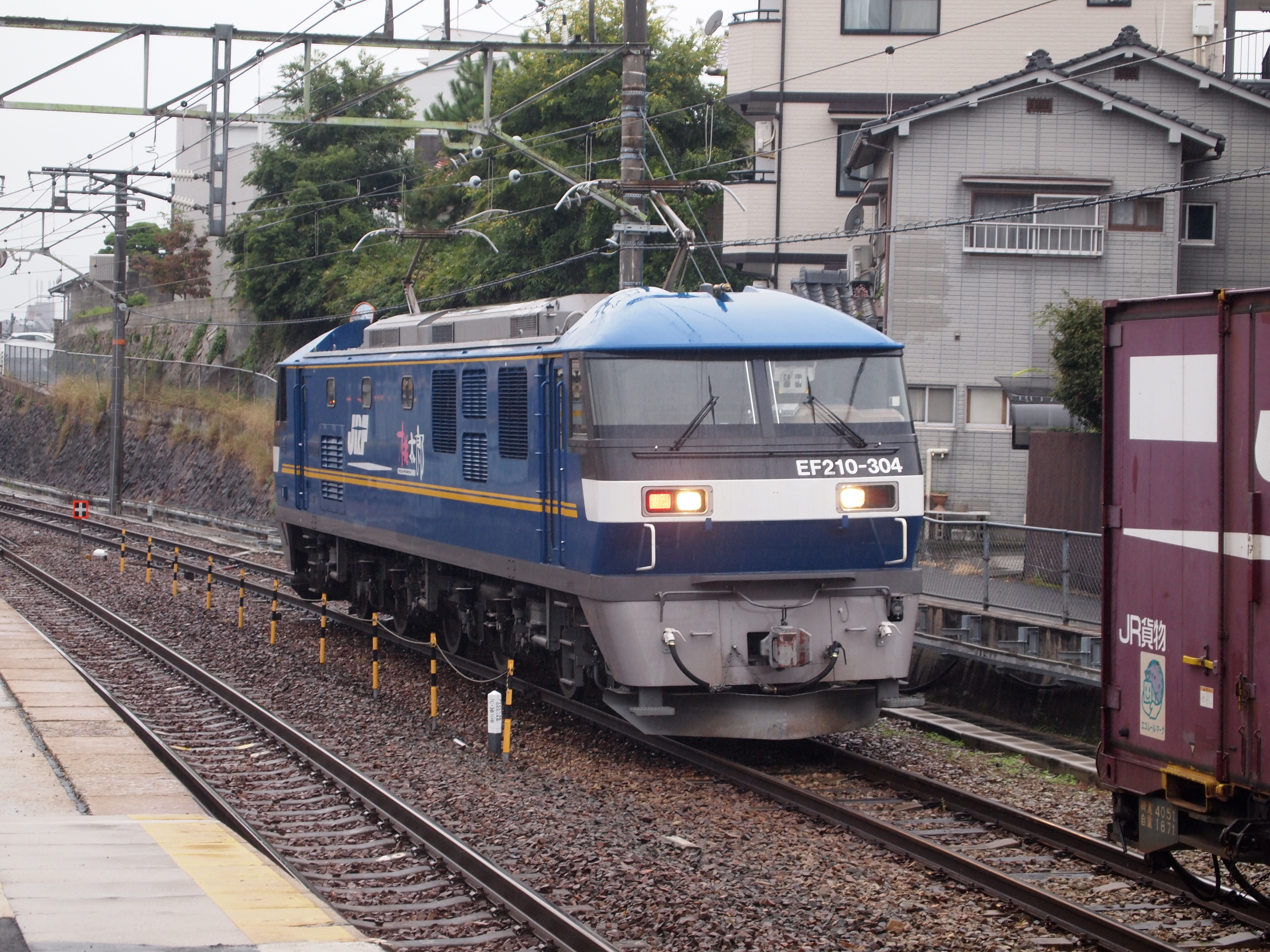
EF210-304 uncoupling from the rear of a Sanyo Main Line freight train in October 2015

The EF210-300 subclass was introduced from March 2013 to replace the dedicated Class EF67 banking locomotives that assist freight trains on the steeply-graded "Senohachi" section of the Sanyō Main Line between Seno and Hachihonmatsu. The first locomotive, EF210-301, was delivered from Kawasaki Heavy Industries in Hyogo on 3 September 2012. It entered service from the start of the revised timetable on 16 March 2013. The second locomotive entered service from 28 April 2013.

The locomotives are painted in an overall-blue livery with yellow lining.

=== Fleet details ===
No.	Manufacturer	Date delivered
EF210-301	Kawasaki Heavy Industries	September 2012
EF210-302	Kawasaki Heavy Industries	April 2013
EF210-303	Kawasaki Heavy Industries	2013
EF210-304	Kawasaki Heavy Industries	July 2015
EF210-305	Kawasaki Heavy Industries	August 2015
EF210-306	Kawasaki Heavy Industries	September 2015
EF210-307	Kawasaki Heavy Industries	September 2015
EF210-308	Kawasaki Heavy Industries	October 2015
EF210-309	Kawasaki Heavy Industries	October 2015
EF210-310	Kawasaki Heavy Industries	August 2017
EF210-311	Kawasaki Heavy Industries	August 2017
EF210-312	Kawasaki Heavy Industries	December 2018
EF210-313	Kawasaki Heavy Industries	January 2019
EF210-314	Kawasaki Heavy Industries	January 2019
EF210-315	Kawasaki Heavy Industries	February 2019
EF210-316	Kawasaki Heavy Industries	February 2020

== Classification ==
The EF210 classification for this locomotive type is explained below. As with previous locomotive designs, the prototype is numbered EF210-901, with subsequent production locomotives numbered from EF210-1 onward.

- E: Electric locomotive
- F: Six driving axles
- 210: DC locomotive with AC motors
