= Class 67 =

Class 67 may refer to:

- British Rail Class 67
- JNR Class EF67
- NSB Class 67
