= Seno Station =

Railway station in Aki-ku, Hiroshima, Japan

Seno Station 瀬野駅
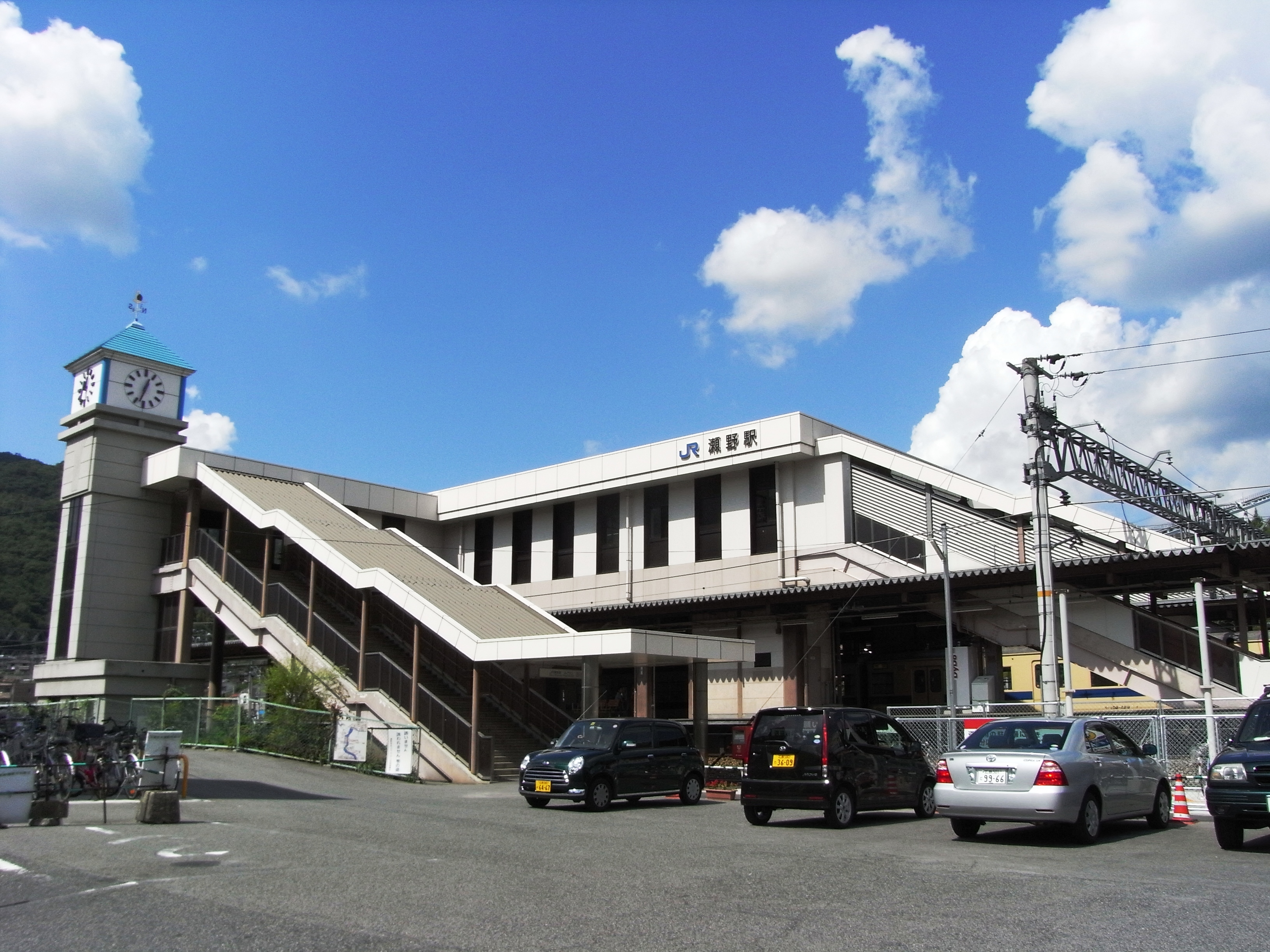
- Seno Station in September 2008

General information
- Location: 1-chōme-5 Seno, Aki-ku, Hiroshima-shi, Hiroshima-ken 739-0311; Japan
- Coordinates: 34°25′18.9″N 132°35′47.7″E
- Owner: West Japan Railway Company
- Operator: West Japan Railway Company
- Line: G Sanyō Main Line
- Distance: 289.5 km (179.9 miles) from Kobe
- Platforms: 1 island platform
- Tracks: 2
- Connections: Bus stop

Construction
- Accessible: Yes

Other information
- Status: Staffed (Midori no Madoguchi )
- Station code: JR-G07
- Website: Official website

History
- Opened: 10 June 1894

Passengers
- FY2019: 3593

Services
Preceding station	JR West	Following station
Nakanohigashi towards Hiroshima	San'yō Line Local	Hachihonmatsu towards Itozaki
Location
- Location within Hiroshima Prefecture Location within Japan

Seno Station (瀬野駅, Seno-eki) is a passenger railway station located in Aki-ku in the city of Hiroshima, Hiroshima Prefecture, Japan. It is operated by the West Japan Railway Company (JR West).

== Lines ==
Seno Station is served by the JR West Sanyō Main Line, and is located 289.5 kilometers from the terminus of the line at Kobe.

== Station layout ==
The station consists of two island platforms connected by an elevated station building. The station has a Midori no Madoguchi staffed ticket office.

== Platforms ==
1,3	■ G Sanyō Main Line	for Hiroshima and Iwakuni
3, 4	■ G Sanyō Main Line	for Saijō and Mihara

== History ==
Seno Station opened as a signal stop on 10 June 1894 on the San'yo Railway with the opening of the line between Itozaki and Hiroshima. The line was nationalized in 1906 and became the San'yo Main Line in 1909. With the privatization of the Japan National Railway (JNR) on 1 April 1987, the station came under the aegis of the West Japan Railway Company (JR West).

== Passenger statistics ==
In fiscal 2019, the station was used by an average of 3593 passengers daily.

== Surrounding area ==
- Seno locomotive depot monument
- Skyrail Town Midorizaka (Residential Complex)
  - The town was connected to Seno Station via the Skyrail Midorizaka Line monorail system until 2024. The system's Midoriguchi Station was adjacent to Seno Station.
- Hiroshima Municipal Senogawa Higashi Junior High School

== See also ==
- List of railway stations in Japan
