= JNR Class ED60 =

Japanese electric locomotive class

Class ED60
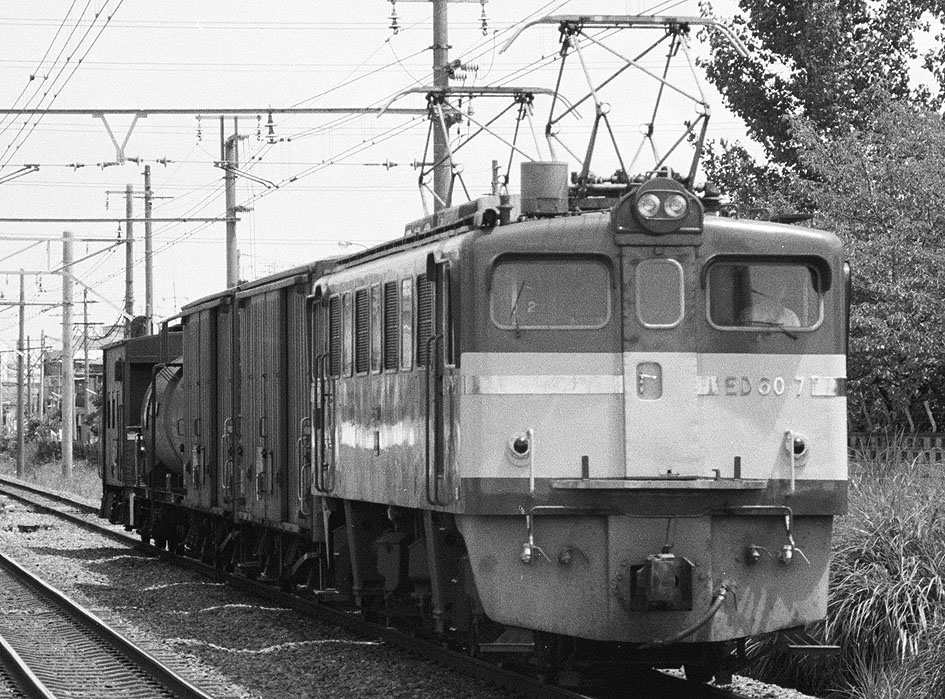
- ED60 7
Type and origin
- Power type: Electric
- Builder: Kawasaki, Tōyō + Kisha Seizō, Mitsubishi
- Build date: 1958–1960
Specifications
- Configuration
  - UIC: Bo-Bo
- Gauge: 1,067 mm (3 ft 6 in)
- Wheel diameter: 1,120 mm (3 ft 8 in)
- Length: 13,000 mm (42 ft 8 in)
- Width: 2,800 mm (9 ft 2 in)
- Height: 3,960 mm (13 ft 0 in)
- Loco weight: 56 tonnes (55 long tons; 62 short tons)
- Electric system/s: 1,500 V DC
- Traction motors: DC
Performance figures
- Maximum speed: 90 km/h (56 mph)
- Power output: 1.56 MW (2,090 hp)
Career
- Operators: JNR
- Number in class: 8
- Withdrawn: 1984–1986
- Disposition: All withdrawn

The Class ED60 (ED60形) was a DC electric locomotive operated by Japanese National Railways (JNR) between 1958 and 1986. It was the first "second-generation" DC electric locomotive type featuring increased-power traction motors. Despite its diminutive size, the Bo-Bo wheel arrangement ED60 design offered performance comparable with the much larger Class EF15 1Co+Co1 design weighing almost twice as much.

Each bogie's two motors ran on a 750 volt voltage and were connected in series. This high-performance DC locomotive has an axle load movement compensation system. The locomotives were dubbed "atomic locomotives" in Japan because of their small size and excellent performance, a reference to the Astro Boy cartoon. For multiple traction, they had transition doors on the front sides. It was originally painted a single shade of No. 2 grape, but from 1965, the front warning color has been altered to No. 1 cream in basic sequential blue No. 15.

Eight locomotives were built between 1958 and 1960 by Kawasaki, Kisha Seizō with Tōyō electrical components, and Mitsubishi. They were introduced on local freight services on the Ōito, Senzan, and Hanwa Lines, replacing earlier ED21, ED22, and ED38 class locomotives acquired when private railways had been absorbed into JNR. The class survived until early 1986 when freight was discontinued on these lines. ED60 1 is preserved at Nagano Depot.

The JNR ED60 locomotive is also celebrated in the model train community, with companies like MicroAce producing detailed replicas that showcase its design and historical significance.

== Build details ==
Number	Manufacturer	Built	Works no.	Withdrawn
ED60 1	Mitsubishi	Aug 1958		Jan 1985
ED60 2	Kawasaki	Aug 1958		Dec 1984
ED60 3	Tōyō + Kisha Seizō	Sep 1958	2796	Dec 1984
ED60 4	Tōyō + Kisha Seizō	Nov 1959	2830	Mar 1986
ED60 5	Tōyō + Kisha Seizō	Dec 1959	2831	Feb 1986
ED60 6	Kawasaki	Oct 1959		Feb 1986
ED60 7	Kawasaki	Nov 1959		Mar 1986
ED60 8	Kawasaki	Mar 1960		Mar 1986

== See also ==
- Japan Railways locomotive numbering and classification
