= JNR Class EF61 =

Class of Japanese electric locomotives

- EF61 no. 207 seen in 1984
Type and origin
- Power type: Electric
- Builder: Kawasaki Electric Manufacturing / Kawasaki Motors / Toyo Denki Manufacturing
- Build date: 1961
- Total produced: 18
Specifications
- Configuration
  - AAR: Bo – Bo – Bo
- Gauge: 1,067 mm
- Length: 17,600 mm
- Width: 2,800 mm
- Height: 3,814 mm
- Adhesive weight: 96.0t
- Electric system/s: 1,500V DC
- Current pickup: Overhead cantenary
- Gear ratio: 16:82=1:5.13
Performance figures
- Maximum speed: 95 km/h
- Power output: 2,340kW
Career
- Operators: Japan National Railways, JNR Freight
- Withdrawn: Used in passenger service until March 1975, then in freigh service until fully withdrawn in 1991
- Preserved: none remain; EF61 201 (until scrapped in 1998), cab of EF61 (until scrapped in 2022)
- Scrapped: all scrapped by 1991

The JNR Class EF61 were a series of Japanese electric locomotives used in passenger service, then in freight service after arrival of the Shinkansen. All have been scrapped.

== Background and history ==
The Class EF61 were derived from JNR Class EF60 locomotives. They were intended for passenger train service, built with modified gearing for high-speed running and the addition of a steam generator. They were designed to be used for high-speed passenger trains of less than 1000 tons.

The EF61 had several design changes made from the EF60 model; an SG1B type steam generator for heating (compatible with general passenger train service) was installed behind the drivers cab, with heating oil and water tanks placed in the rear of the unit. The main equipment room inside the locomotive also varies from the EF60 model, mainly with the placement of the main electric motor cooling radiators and the air compressor equipment being moved, now located in the undercarriage. The addition of steam heat added an extra 1.6m to the length of the locomotive, with the addition of ventilation flaps and small windows on the sides were in a continuous, horizontal line. This allowed more light into the unit. The extra windows allowed the fireman to visually inspect the steam generator. This design would be copied on later locomotives.

The bogies used were also based on those used on the first-generation EF60 locomotives, with DT115 bogies used at both ends. However, due to the distance increase between the bogie centers (compared to the EF60) and intermediate one was used, the DT116A. The DT116A was equipped with a swing bolster suspension link system, using an almost straight-line displacement mechanism, that had been used on a trial basis on EF60 locomotive No. 2.

The addition of the steam heat equipment increased the overall weight of the locomotive, but other equipment that was not needed in passenger service was removed (the vernier control and the motor re-adhesion device), keeping the final weight of the EF61 close to that of the EF60.

Due to their excellent high-speed performance, EF61 locomotives were used to haul 20-Series sleeper cars and were also frequently found running as helper locomotives along the Senohachi Pass line, with Series 151 or 153 locomotives. By this time, passenger trains were on the decline and only 18 EF61 units were built. In later years, the EF61s were used to haul freight trains on the Sanyo Main Line, only to be replaced by the type EF160 locomotives in 1984.

Most units were scrapped in the 1980s, with some kept in the reserve fleet for freight service, before being retired due to their aged and eventually scrapped in the 1990s.
