= Aki-ku =

Ward in Hiroshima, Japan

Aki-ku 安芸区
- Ward
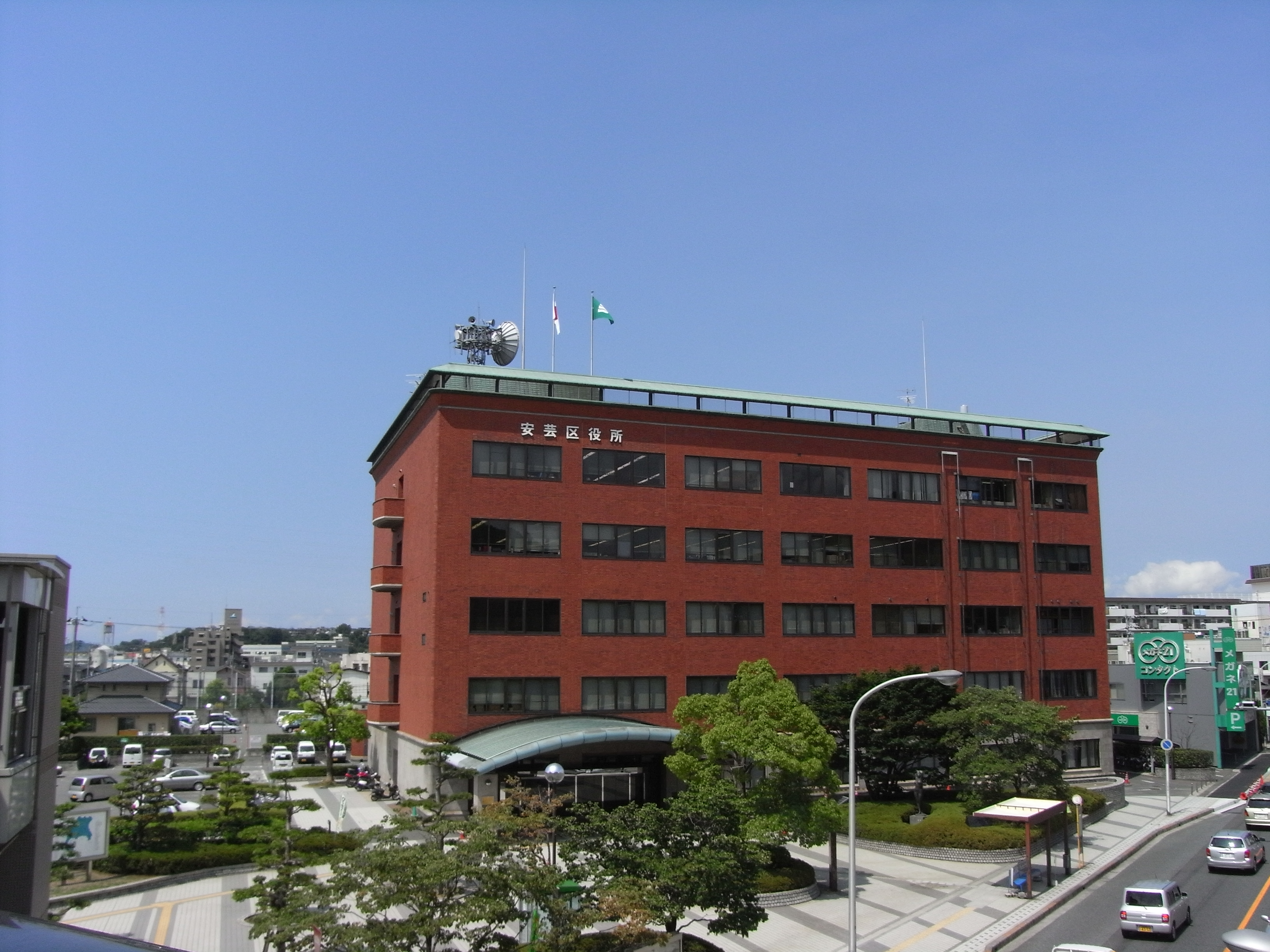
- Aki Ward Office

- Flag Seal

- Location of Aki-ku in Hiroshima City

- Location within Japan
- Coordinates: 34.3989°N 132.5906°E
- Country: Japan
- Region: Chūgoku (Sanyo)
- Prefecture: Hiroshima
- City: Hiroshima
- Established: April 1, 1980

Area
  - Total: 94.01 km^{2} (36.30 sq mi)

Population (August 1, 2026)
  - Total: 71,996
  - Density: 765/km^{2} (1,980/sq mi)
- Time zone: UTC+9 (Japan Standard Time)
- Postal: 736-8501
- Aki Ward Office's Address: 4-36 Funakoshi-minami 3-chome, Aki-ku, Hiroshima City, Hiroshima Prefecture (広島県広島市安芸区船越南三丁目4番36号)
- Website: Official site

Aki-ku (安芸区) is one of the eight wards of the city of Hiroshima, Japan.

As of November 1, 2005, the ward has an estimated population of 76,858 and a density of 817.55 persons per km^{2}. The total area is 94.01 km^{2}.
