= Mukainada Station =

Railway station in Fuchū town, Hiroshima Prefecture, Japan

Mukainada Station 向洋駅
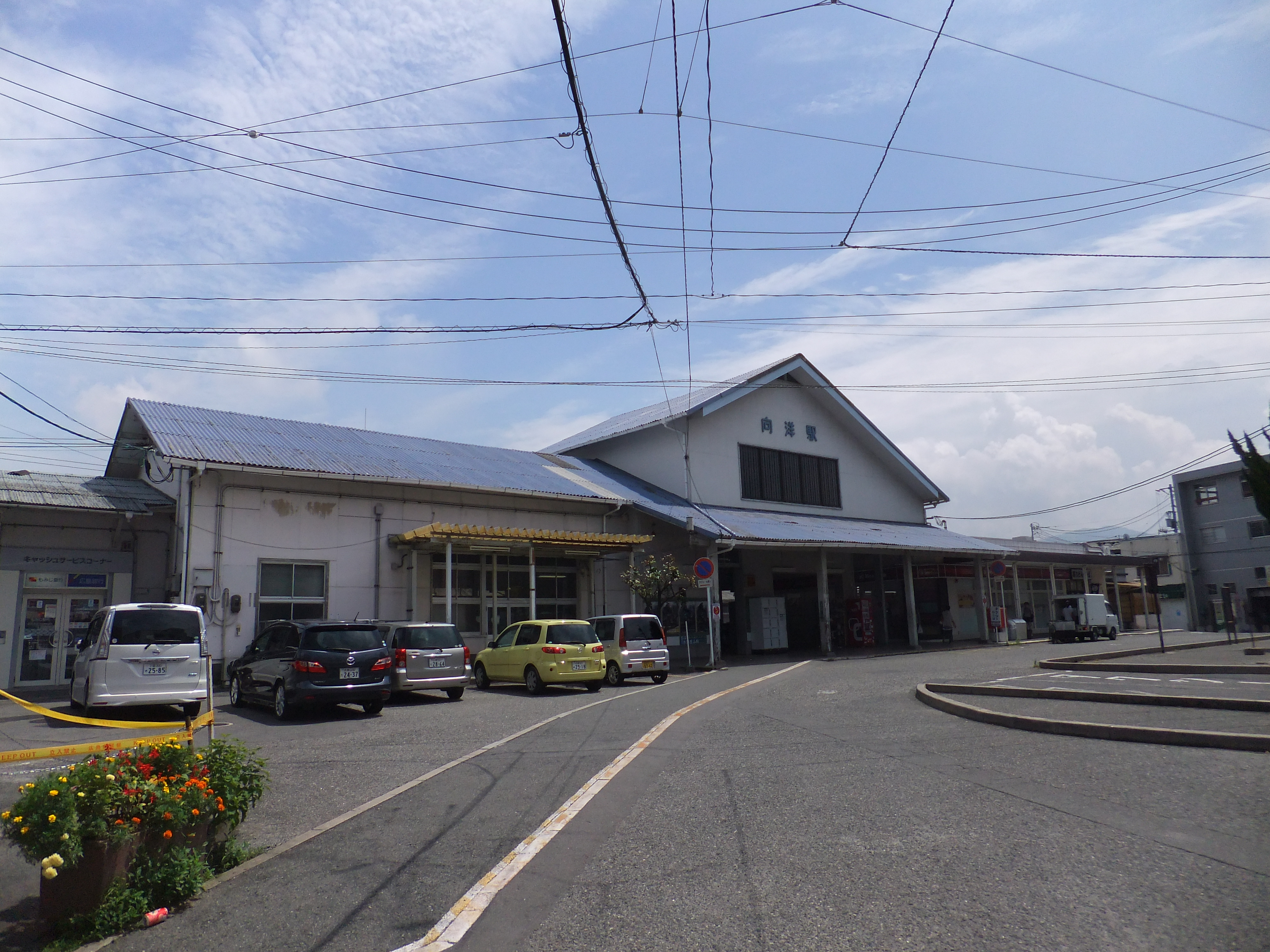
- Mukainada Station in August 2014

General information
- Location: Aosakiminami, Fuchu-cho, Aki-gun, Hiroshima-ken 735-0017; Japan
- Coordinates: 34°22′35.7″N 132°30′21.2″E
- Owner: West Japan Railway Company
- Operator: West Japan Railway Company
- Line: G Sanyō Main Line Y Kure Line
- Distance: 300.6 km (186.8 miles) from Kobe
- Platforms: 2 side platforms
- Tracks: 4
- Connections: Bus stop

Construction
- Accessible: Yes

Other information
- Status: Staffed
- Station code: JR-G03, JR-Y03
- Website: Official website

History
- Opened: 1 August 1920

Passengers
- FY2019: 11,976

Services
Preceding station	JR West	Following station
Tenjingawa towards Hiroshima	San'yō Line Local	Kaitaichi towards Itozaki
Tenjingawa towards Hiroshima	Kure Line Local	Kaitaichi towards Mihara
Location
- Location within Hiroshima Prefecture Location within Japan

Mukainada Station (向洋駅, Mukainada-eki) is a passenger railway station located in the town of Fuchū, Aki District, Hiroshima Prefecture, Japan. It is operated by the West Japan Railway Company (JR West).

== Lines ==
Mukainada Station is served by the JR West Sanyō Main Line, and is located 300.6 kilometers from the terminus of the line at Kobe. It is also serviced by trains of the Kure Line and is 89.3 kilometers from the terminus of that line at Mihara

== Station layout ==
The station consists of two opposed side platforms connected by a footbridge. The outer sides of the platforms are used for passenger traffic, and the inner two tracks (without passenger platform facilities) are used for freight trains and through traffic. The station is staffed.

== Platforms ==
1	■ G Sanyō Main Line	for Hiroshima and Iwakuni
1	■ Y Kure Line	for Hiroshima
4	■ G Sanyō Main Line	for Saijō and Mihara
4	■ Y Kure Line	for Kure and Hiro

== History ==
Mukainada Station was opened on 1 August 1920.

== Passenger statistics ==
In fiscal 2019, the station was used by an average of 11,976 passengers daily.

== Surrounding area ==
- Japan National Route 2
- Mazda HQ
- Mazda Museum

== See also ==
- List of railway stations in Japan
