= Hachihonmatsu Station =

Railway station in Higashihiroshima, Hiroshima Prefecture, Japan

Hachihonmatsu Station 八本松駅
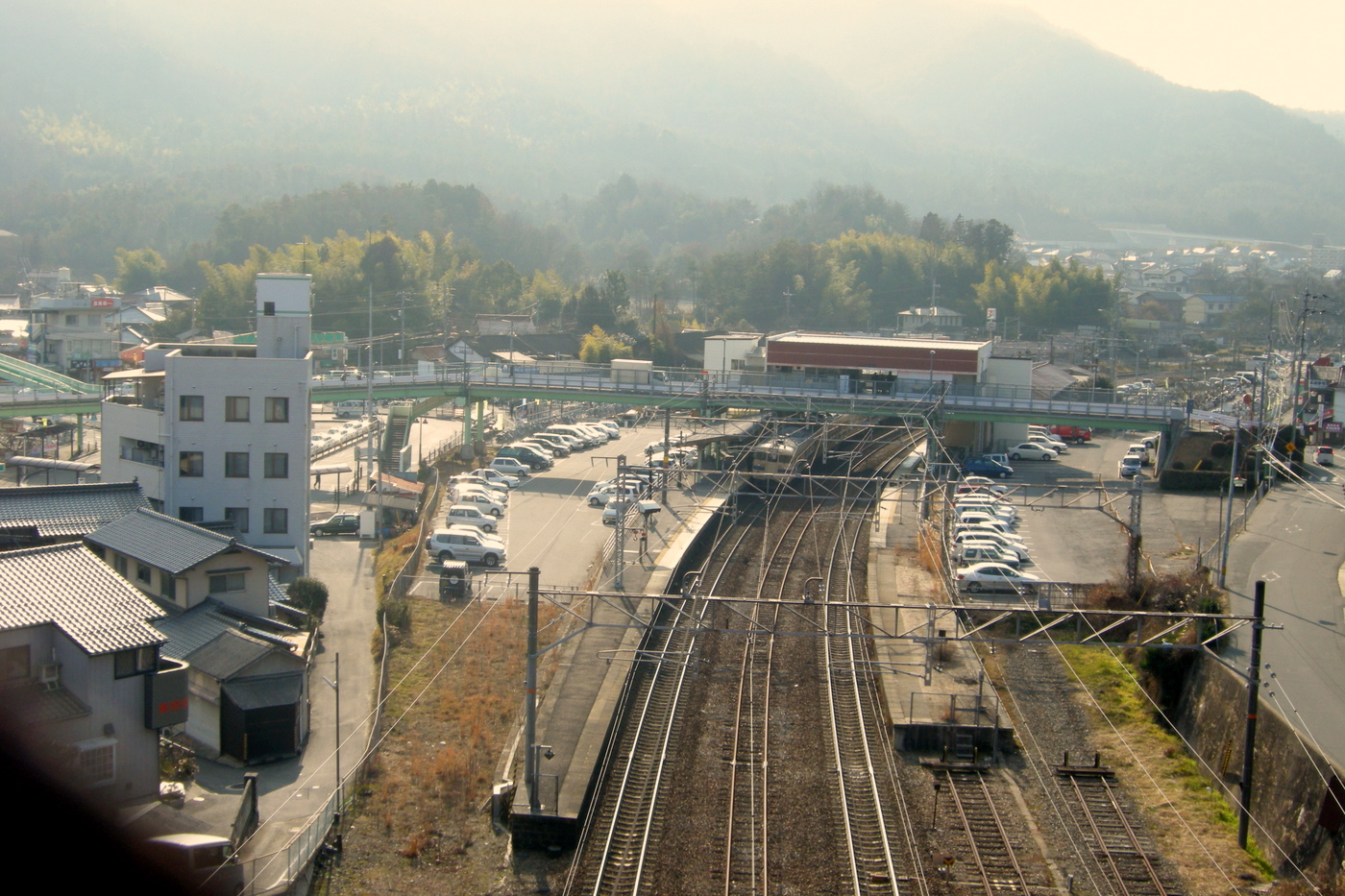
- Hachihonmatsu Station in January 2009

General information
- Location: 1539 Iida, Hachihonmatsu-cho, Higashihiroshima-shi, Hiroshima-ken 739-0141; Japan
- Coordinates: 34°26′44.29″N 132°41′18.22″E
- Owner: West Japan Railway Company
- Operator: West Japan Railway Company
- Line: G Sanyō Main Line
- Distance: 278.9 km (173.3 miles) from Kobe
- Platforms: 2 side platforms
- Tracks: 2
- Connections: Bus stop

Construction
- Accessible: Yes

Other information
- Status: Staffed (Midori no Madoguchi )
- Station code: JR-G08
- Website: Official website

History
- Opened: 4 April 1895

Passengers
- FY2019: 3883

Services
Preceding station	JR West	Following station
Kaitaichi towards Hiroshima	San'yō Line Rapid	Jike towards Itozaki
Seno towards Hiroshima	San'yō Line Local	Jike towards Itozaki
Location
- Location within Hiroshima Prefecture Location within Japan

Hachihommatsu Station (八本松駅, Hachihonmatsu-eki) is a passenger railway station located in the city of Higashihiroshima, Hiroshima Prefecture, Japan. It is operated by the West Japan Railway Company (JR West).

== Lines ==
Hachihommatsu Station is served by the JR West Sanyō Main Line, and is located 278.9 kilometers from the terminus of the line at Kobe.

== Station layout ==
The station consists of two opposed side platforms connected by an elevated station building. In the middle there is a central line without a platform. In addition, there are several sidings on the south side of Platform 2, which are used by maintenance vehicles. The station has a Midori no Madoguchi staffed ticket office.

== Platforms ==
1	■ G Sanyō Main Line	for Saijō and Mihara
2	■ G Sanyō Main Line	for Hiroshima and Iwakuni

== History ==
Hachihonmatsu Station was opened on 4 April 1895. It is located in the northwest of the Saijō Basin and is surrounded by mountains. The area around the station is the uppermost part of the Seno River system, which flows to Hiroshima City, but it turns into the Kurose River system, which flows to Kure in the east, with the watershed near the Kamigumi district on the east side. Mountainside alluvial fans have also been cleared, and many terraced rice fields can be seen. Before World War II, the main settlement was located only on the north side of the railroad tracks, in the Kamigumi area on the north and northeast sides of the station, and on the south side of the station, there were almost no houses and it was all paddy fields. On the northwest side of the station was the Imperial Japanese Army's Kawakami Ammunition Depot, which has been managed by the U.S. Forces in Japan after the war. Since the 1960s, the mountains northeast of the station have been cleared to create an industrial park, and much of the paddy fields were reclaimed and converted into a commuter town for Hiroshima and Mihara. Since development progressed mainly on the south side of the station, in 1968 a new station building was built on the overpass directly above the tracks to improve access to the south side, and the station building on the north side was closed. The villages on the north side of the station are lined up along Prefectural Route 46. The section near the station on Prefectural Route 46 was the former Sanyōdō highway in the Edo period.

With the privatization of the Japanese National Railways (JNR) on 1 April 1987, the station came under the control of JR West.

== Passenger statistics ==
In the 2019 fiscal year, the station was used by an average of 3883 passengers daily.

== Surrounding area ==
- Higashihiroshima City Hachihonmatsu Branch Office (city hall branch office)
- Higashihiroshima Municipal Hachihonmatsu Junior High School
- Higashihiroshima Municipal Hachihonmatsu Elementary School
- Higashihiroshima Municipal Kawakami Elementary School
- U.S. Forces Japan Kawakami Ammunition Depot

== See also ==
- List of railway stations in Japan
