= Kaitaichi Station =

Railway station in Kaita, Hiroshima Prefecture, Japan

Kaitaichi Station 海田市駅
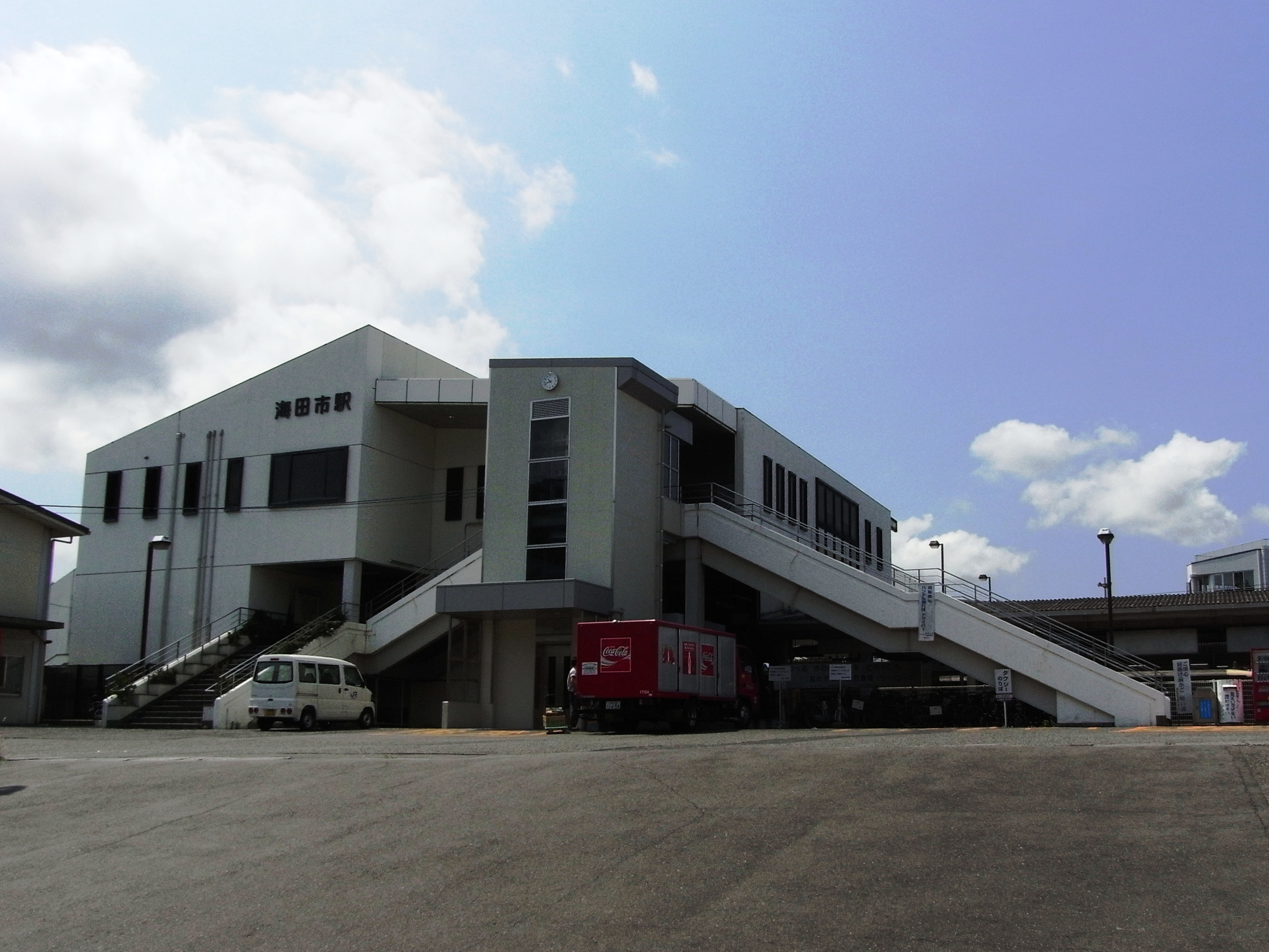
- Kaitaichi Station in July 2008

General information
- Location: 20-20 Shinmachi Kaita-cho, Aki-gun, Hiroshima-ken 736-0068; Japan
- Coordinates: 34°22′19.52″N 132°31′49.95″E
- Owner: West Japan Railway Company
- Operator: West Japan Railway Company
- Line: G Sanyō Main Line Y Kure Line
- Distance: 298.3 km (185.4 miles) from Kobe
- Platforms: 1 side + 2 island platforms
- Tracks: 5
- Connections: Bus stop

Construction
- Accessible: Yes

Other information
- Status: Staffed
- Station code: JR-G04, JR-Y04
- Website: Official website

History
- Opened: 10 June 1894

Passengers
- FY2019: 9915

Services
Preceding station	JR West	Following station
Hiroshima Terminus	San'yō Line Rapid	Hachihonmatsu towards Itozaki
Mukainada towards Hiroshima	San'yō Line Local	Aki-Nakano towards Itozaki
Hiroshima Terminus	Kure Line Rapid; Akiji Liner	Yano towards Mihara
Mukainada towards Hiroshima	Kure Line Local	Yano towards Mihara
Location
- Location within Hiroshima Prefecture Location within Japan

Kaitaichi Station (海田市駅, Kaitaichi-eki) is a passenger railway station located in the town of Kaita, Aki District, Hiroshima Prefecture, Japan. It is operated by the West Japan Railway Company (JR West).

== Lines ==
Kaitaichi Station is served by the JR West Sanyō Main Line, and is located 298.3 kilometers from the terminus of the line at Kobe. It is also serviced by trains of the Kure Line and is 87.0 kilometers from the terminus of that line at Mihara. The track used by Kure Line trains bound for Yano splits off the track used by Sanyo Line trains around Aki-Nakano, located about 600m west from this station.

== Station layout ==
The station consists of one side platform and two island platforms connected by an elevated station building. The station is staffed.

== Platforms ==
1	■ G Sanyō Main Line	for Saijō and Mihara
2, 3	■ G Sanyō Main Line	for Hiroshima and Iwakuni
4	■ Y Kure Line	for Kure and Hiro
5	■ Y Kure Line	for Hiroshima and Iwakuni

== History ==
Kaitaichi Station was opened on 10 June 1894.

== Passenger statistics ==
In fiscal 2019, the station was used by an average of 9915 passengers daily.

== Surrounding area ==
- Hiroshima City Aki Ward Office
- Hiroshima Prefectural Kaita High School
- Kaita Town Office

== See also ==
- List of railway stations in Japan
