= Tenjingawa Station =

Railway station in Minami-ku, Hiroshima, Japan

Tenjingawa Station 天神川駅
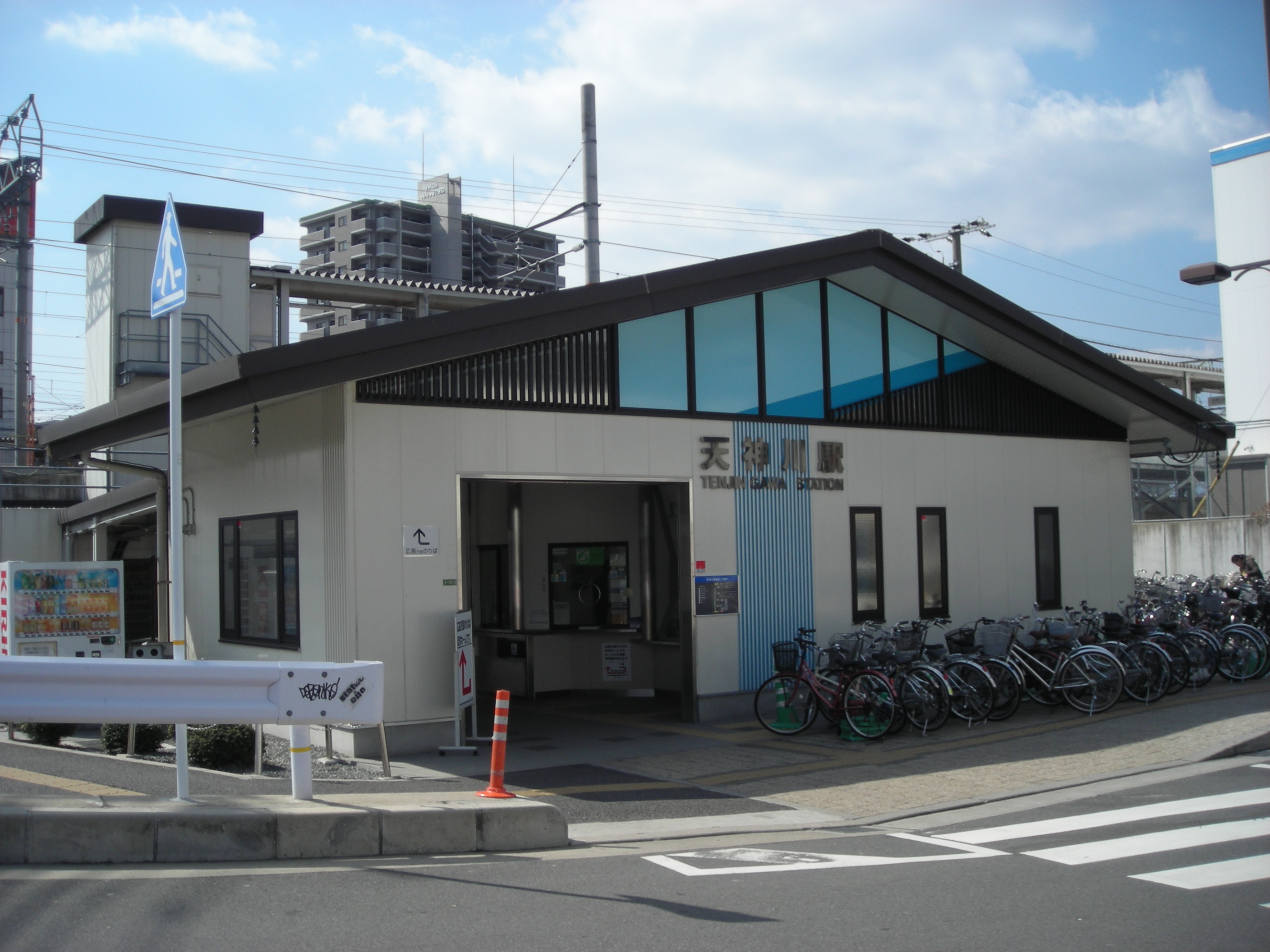
- Tenjingawa Station in March 2008

General information
- Location: 1 Higashiekimachi, Minami-ku, Hiroshima-shi, Hiroshima-ken, 732-0801; Japan
- Coordinates: 34°23′23.8″N 132°29′53.95″E
- Owner: West Japan Railway Company
- Operator: West Japan Railway Company
- Line: G Sanyō Main Line
- Distance: 302.4 km (187.9 miles) from Kobe
- Platforms: 2 side platforms
- Tracks: 2
- Connections: Bus stop

Construction
- Accessible: Yes

Other information
- Status: Staffed
- Station code: JR-G02 / JR-Y02
- Website: Official website

History
- Opened: 13 March 2004

Passengers
- FY2019: 10,551

Services
Preceding station	JR West	Following station
Hiroshima Terminus	San'yō Line Local	Mukainada towards Itozaki
Hiroshima Terminus	Kure Line Local	Mukainada towards Mihara
Location
- Location within Hiroshima Prefecture Location within Japan

Tenjingawa Station (天神川駅, Tenjingawa-eki) is a passenger railway station located in Minami-ku in the city of Hiroshima, Hiroshima Prefecture, Japan. It is operated by the West Japan Railway Company (JR West).

== Lines ==
Tenjingawa Station is served by the JR West Sanyō Main Line, and is located 302.4 kilometers from the terminus of the line at Kobe. It is also served by trains of the Kure Line and is 91.1 kilometers from the terminus of that line at Mihara.

== Station layout ==
The station consists of two opposed side platforms on an embankment, with the station facilities at ground level. The station is staffed.

== Platforms ==
1	■ G Sanyō Main Line	for Saijō and Mihara
1	■ Y Kure Line	for Kure and Hiro
2	■ G Sanyō Main Line	for Hiroshima, Iwakuni and Miyajimaguchi
2	■ Y Sanyō Main Line	for Hiroshima

== History ==
Tenjingawa station opened on 13 March 2004.

== Passenger statistics ==
In fiscal 2019, the station was used by an average of 10,551 passengers daily.

== Surrounding area ==
The container yard of the Hiroshima Freight Terminal Station and the vehicle yard of the Hiroshima Driver's Depot are located at this station.

- Fuchu Town Hall

== See also ==
- List of railway stations in Japan
