= Jike Station =

Railway station in Higashihiroshima, Hiroshima Prefecture, Japan

Jike Station 寺家駅
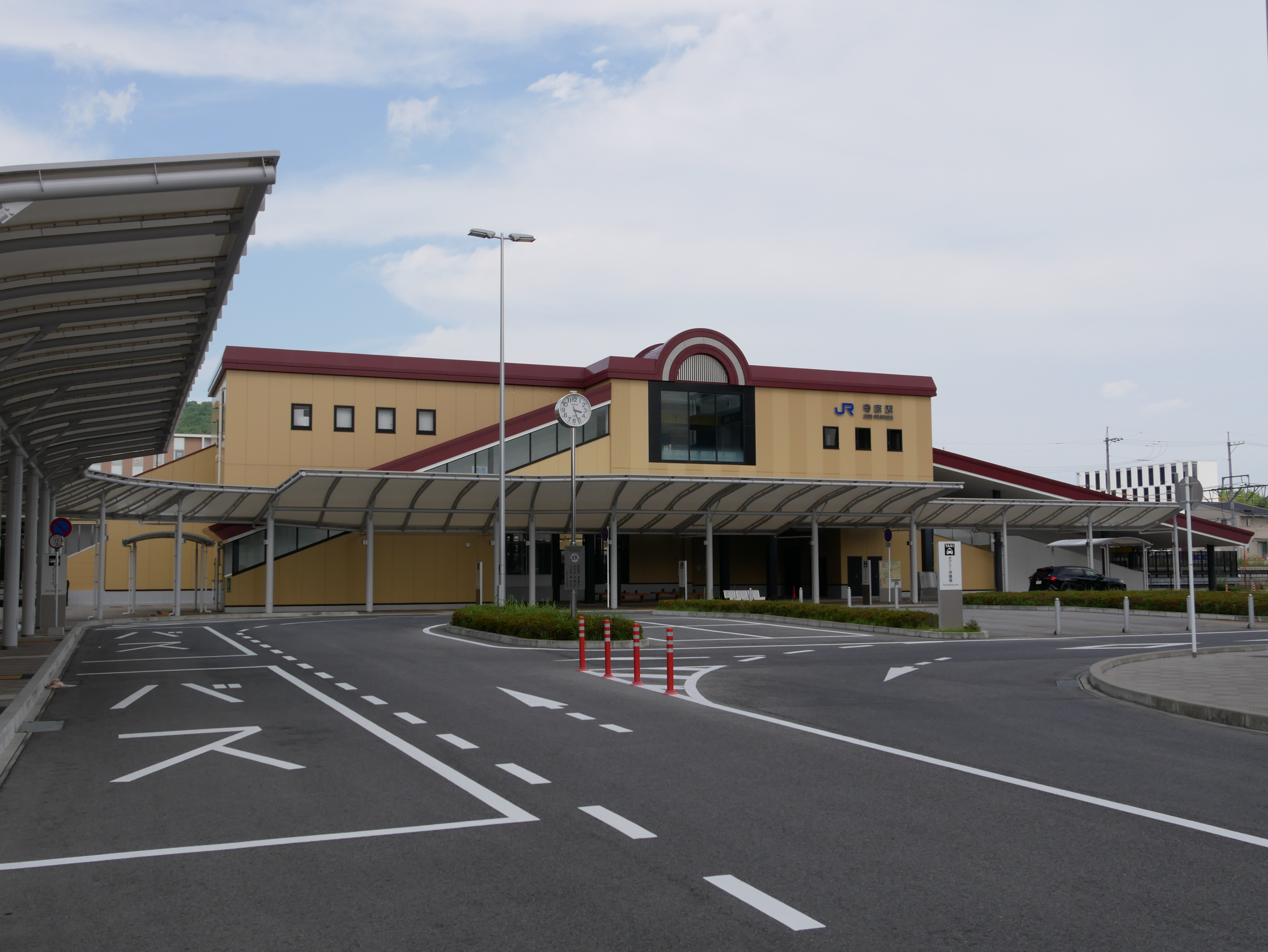
- The south side of Jike Station in June 2020

General information
- Location: 4369-311 Jike Saijo-cho, Higashihiroshima-shi, Hiroshima-ken 739-0041; Japan
- Coordinates: 34°26′21.2″N 132°43′21.8″E
- Owner: West Japan Railway Company
- Operator: West Japan Railway Company
- Line: G Sanyō Main Line
- Distance: 278.9 km (173.3 miles) from Kobe
- Platforms: 2 side platforms
- Tracks: 2
- Connections: Bus stop

Construction
- Accessible: Yes

Other information
- Status: Staffed (Midori no Madoguchi )
- Station code: JR-G09
- Website: Official website

History
- Opened: 4 March 2017

Passengers
- FY2019: 1867

Services
Preceding station	JR West	Following station
Hachihommatsu towards Hiroshima	San'yō Line Rapid	Saijo towards Itozaki
Hachihommatsu towards Hiroshima	San'yō Line Local	Saijo towards Itozaki
Location
- Location within Hiroshima Prefecture Location within Japan

Jike Station (寺家駅, Jike-eki) is a passenger railway station located in the city of Higashihiroshima, Hiroshima Prefecture, Japan. It is operated by the West Japan Railway Company (JR West).

== Lines ==
Jike Station is served by the JR West Sanyō Main Line, and is located 275.2 kilometers from the terminus of the line at Kobe.

== Station layout ==
The station consists of two opposed side platforms connected by an elevated station building. The station has a Midori no Madoguchi staffed ticket office.

== Platforms ==
1	■ G Sanyō Main Line	for Hachihonmatsu and Hiroshima
2	■ G Sanyō Main Line	for Saijō and Mihara

== History ==
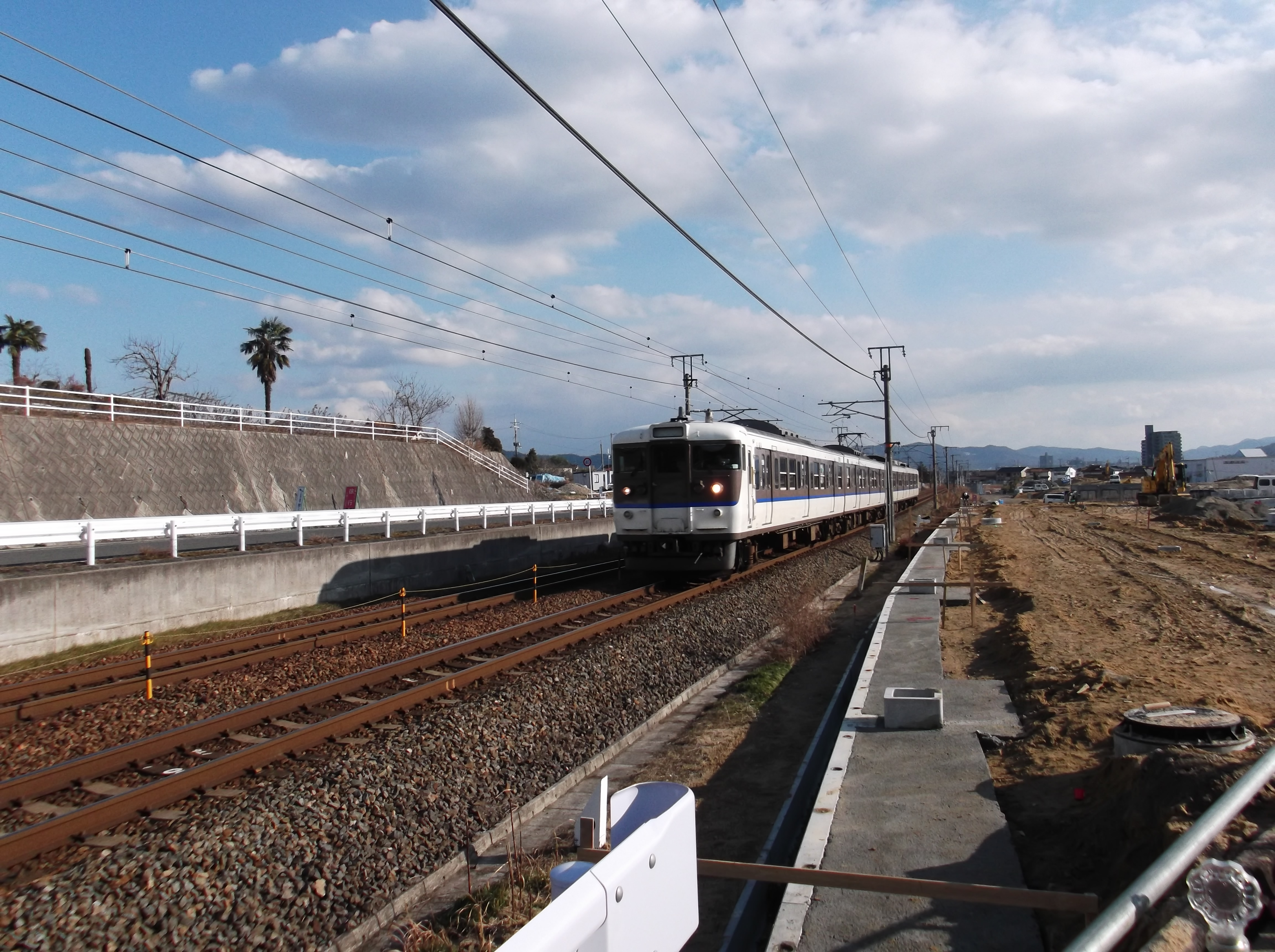
The site in January 2013 before the start of construction

The name of the new station was officially announced by JR West in July 2016. The station opened on 4 March 2017. The construction costs of approximately 2.1 billion yen were borne entirely by the city of Higashihiroshima.

== Passenger statistics ==
In fiscal 2019, the station was used by an average of 1867 passengers daily.

== Surrounding area ==
- National Route 486
- Hiroshima Prefectural Kamo High School
- Chuo Junior High School
- Saijo Junior High School
- Hiraiwa Elementary School
- Teranishi Elementary School

== See also ==
- List of railway stations in Japan
