= Jike =

Jike may refer to:

- Jike Station
- People's Daily
