= Yano Station =

Railway station in Aki-ku, Hiroshima, Japan

Yano Station 矢野駅
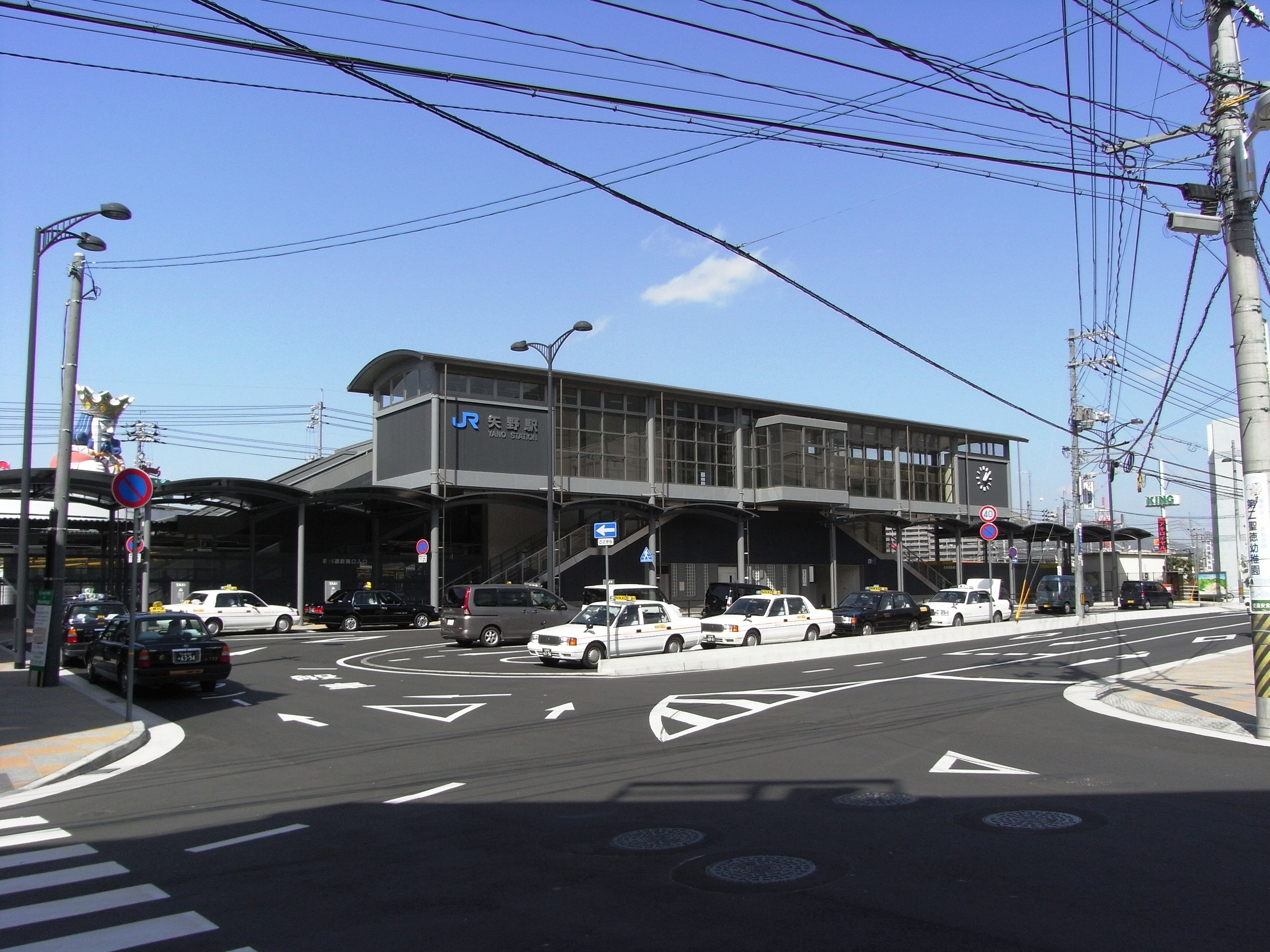
- Yano Station in February 2009

General information
- Location: 1-chōme-32 Yanonishi, Aki-ku, Hiroshima-shi, Hiroshima-ken 736-0085; Japan
- Coordinates: 34°21′7.78″N 132°31′55.29″E
- Owner: West Japan Railway Company
- Operator: West Japan Railway Company
- Line: Y Kure Line
- Distance: 84.4 km (52.4 miles) from Mihara
- Platforms: 2 side platforms
- Tracks: 2
- Connections: Bus stop

Construction
- Accessible: Yes

Other information
- Status: Staffed
- Station code: JR-Y05
- Website: Official website

History
- Opened: 27 December 1903

Passengers
- FY2019: 7717

Services
Preceding station	JR West	Following station
Kaitaichi towards Hiroshima	Kure Line Local	Saka towards Mihara
Hiroshima Terminus	Kure Line Rapid; Akiji Liner	Kure towards Mihara
Location
- Location within Hiroshima Prefecture Location within Japan

Yano Station (矢野駅, Yano-eki) is a passenger railway station located in Aki-ku in the city of Hiroshima, Hiroshima Prefecture, Japan. It is operated by the West Japan Railway Company (JR West).

== Lines ==
Yano Station is served by the JR West Kure Line, and is located 84.4 kilometers from the terminus of the line at Mihara.

== Station layout ==
The station consists of two opposed ground-level side platforms connected by an elevated station building. The station is staffed.The design of the current station building is based on the motifs of the old machiya (traditional Japanese townhouses) and the curve of kamoji (a traditional toupée), which was once a representative industry of the Yano district.

== Platforms ==
1	■ Y Kure Line	for Kure and Mihara
2	■ Y Kure Line	for Hiroshima

== History ==
Yano Station opened on 27 December 1903. With the privatization of the Japan National Railway (JNR) on 1 April 1987, the station came under the aegis of the West Japan Railway Company (JR West).

== Passenger statistics ==
In fiscal 2019, the station was used by an average of 7717 passengers daily.

== Surrounding area ==
The station is located is a residential area and shops are scattered here and there. There is a Self-Defense Forces garrison on the north side of the station, an industrial park on the northwest side of the station, and Hiroshima Prefectural Aki Minami High School and Saiseikai Hiroshima Hospital are located nearby.

== See also ==
- List of railway stations in Japan
