= X19 =

X19 may refer to:

- X19 (New York City bus)
- Aeroflot Flight X-19, which crashed in 1966
- Curtiss-Wright X-19, an American experimental tiltrotor
- Fiat X1/9, a sports car
- Itozaki Station, in Hiroshima Prefecture, Japan
