= Hiroshima Freight Terminal =

Coordinates: 34°23′23″N 132°29′52″E

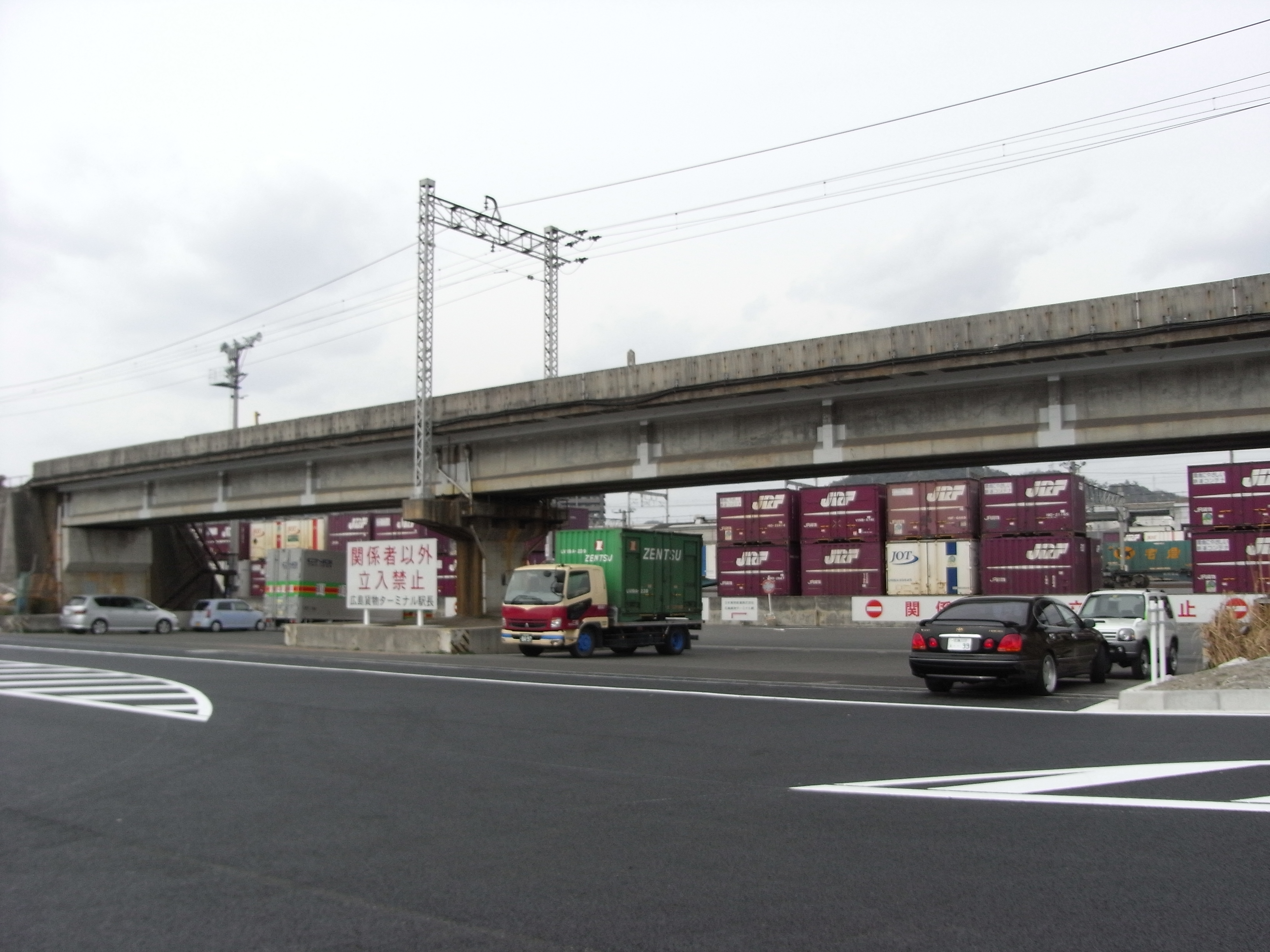
- Hiroshima Freight Terminal, March 2009
- Interactive map of Hiroshima Freight Terminal

Location
- Location: Minami-ku, Hiroshima

Details
- Built: ?
- Operated by: ?
- Rail lines: Sanyō Main Line; Geibi Line

Hiroshima Freight Terminal (広島貨物ターミナル駅, Hiroshima Kamotsu Tāminaru-eki) is a railway freight terminal in Higashi Eki-chō, Minami-ku, Hiroshima, Japan, owned and operated by Japan Freight Railway Company (JR Freight).

== Location ==
Hiroshima Freight Terminal is situated between Hiroshima and Tenjingawa stations on the JR West Sanyō Main Line and between Hiroshima and Yaga on the Geibi Line. It is located adjacent to Hiroshima motive power depot.

The terminal has four loading and unloading tracks, and seven arrival and departure tracks.

== Recent Developments ==
As of 2025, there are no public records of major upgrades or expansions specific to Hiroshima Freight Terminal. However, JR Freight has been testing new technologies such as the integration of rail freight with automated truck systems, which may influence operations at major terminals in the future.
