= Takehara Station =

Railway station in Takehara, Hiroshima Prefecture, Japan

Takehara Station 竹原駅
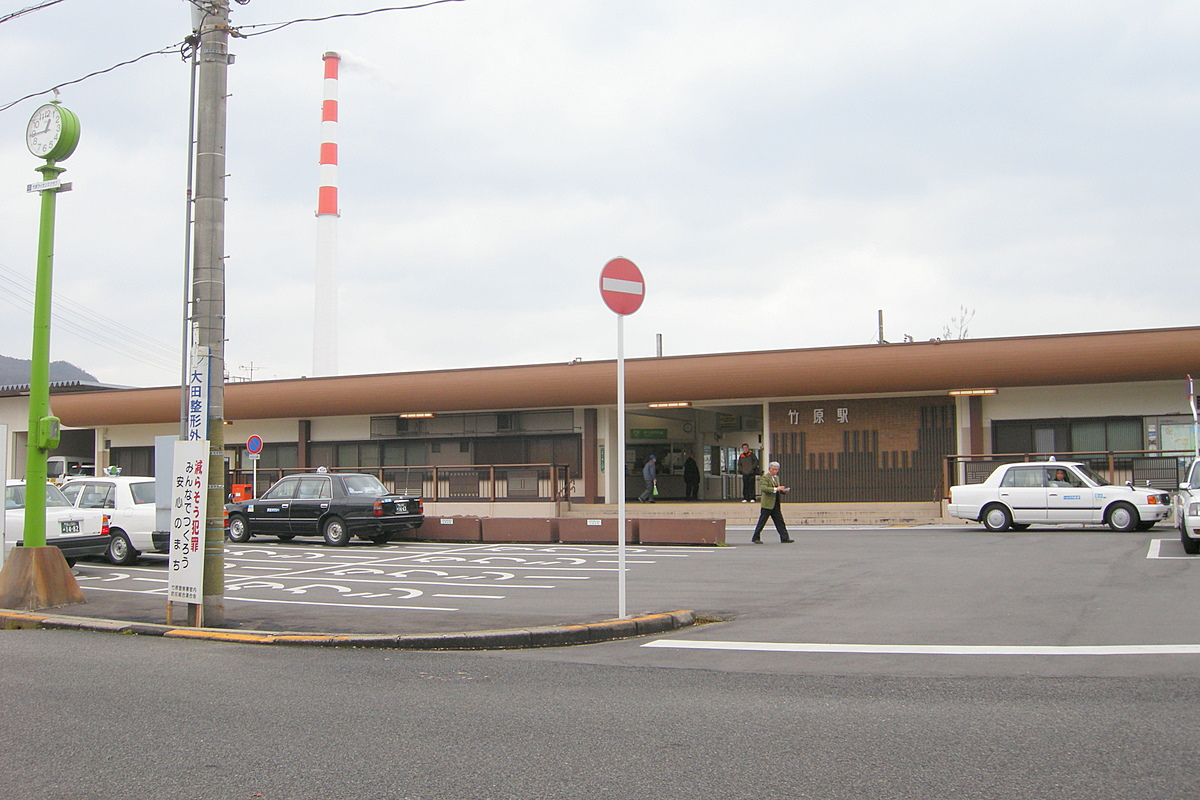
- Takehara Station, 2009

General information
- Location: 1-chōme-1 Chuo, Takehara-shi, Hiroshima-ken 725-0026; Japan
- Coordinates: 34°20′22.18″N 132°54′36.08″E
- Owner: West Japan Railway Company
- Operator: West Japan Railway Company
- Line: Y Kure Line
- Distance: 25.3 km (15.7 miles) from Mihara
- Platforms: 2 island platform
- Tracks: 2
- Connections: Bus stop

Construction
- Structure type: Ground level
- Accessible: Yes

Other information
- Status: Unstaffed
- Station code: JR-Y25
- Website: Official website

History
- Opened: 10 July 1932

Passengers
- FY2019: 792

Services
Preceding station	JR West	Following station
Yoshina towards Hiroshima	Kure Line Local	Ōnori towards Mihara
Location
- Location within Hiroshima Prefecture Location within Japan

Takehara Station (竹原駅, Takehara-eki) is a passenger railway station located in the city of Takehara, Hiroshima Prefecture, Japan. It is operated by the West Japan Railway Company (JR West). Takehara Station is mentioned in the slice-of-life anime series Tamayura.

== Lines ==
Takehara Station is served by the JR West Kure Line, and is located 25.3 kilometers from the terminus of the line at Mihara.

== Station layout ==
The station consists of one ground-level island platform connected to the station building by a footbridge. The station is staffed.

== Platforms ==
1	■ Y Kure Line	for Mihara and Fukuyama
2	■ Y Kure Line	for Kure and Hiroshima

== History ==
Tadanouchi Station was opened on 10 July 1932. With the privatization of the Japanese National Railways (JNR) on 1 April 1987, the station came under the control of JR West.

== Passenger statistics ==
In fiscal 2019, the station was used by an average of 792 passengers daily.

== Surrounding area ==
- Takehara City Hall
- Hiroshima Prefectural Takehara High School
- Takehara City Takehara Junior High School
- Takehara City Takehara Elementary School

== See also ==
- List of railway stations in Japan
