= Hiroshima Station =

Major railway and tram station in Hiroshima, Japan

Coordinates: 34°23′54″N 132°28′33″E

B 01 G 01 P 01 R 01 Y 01 Hiroshima Station 広島駅
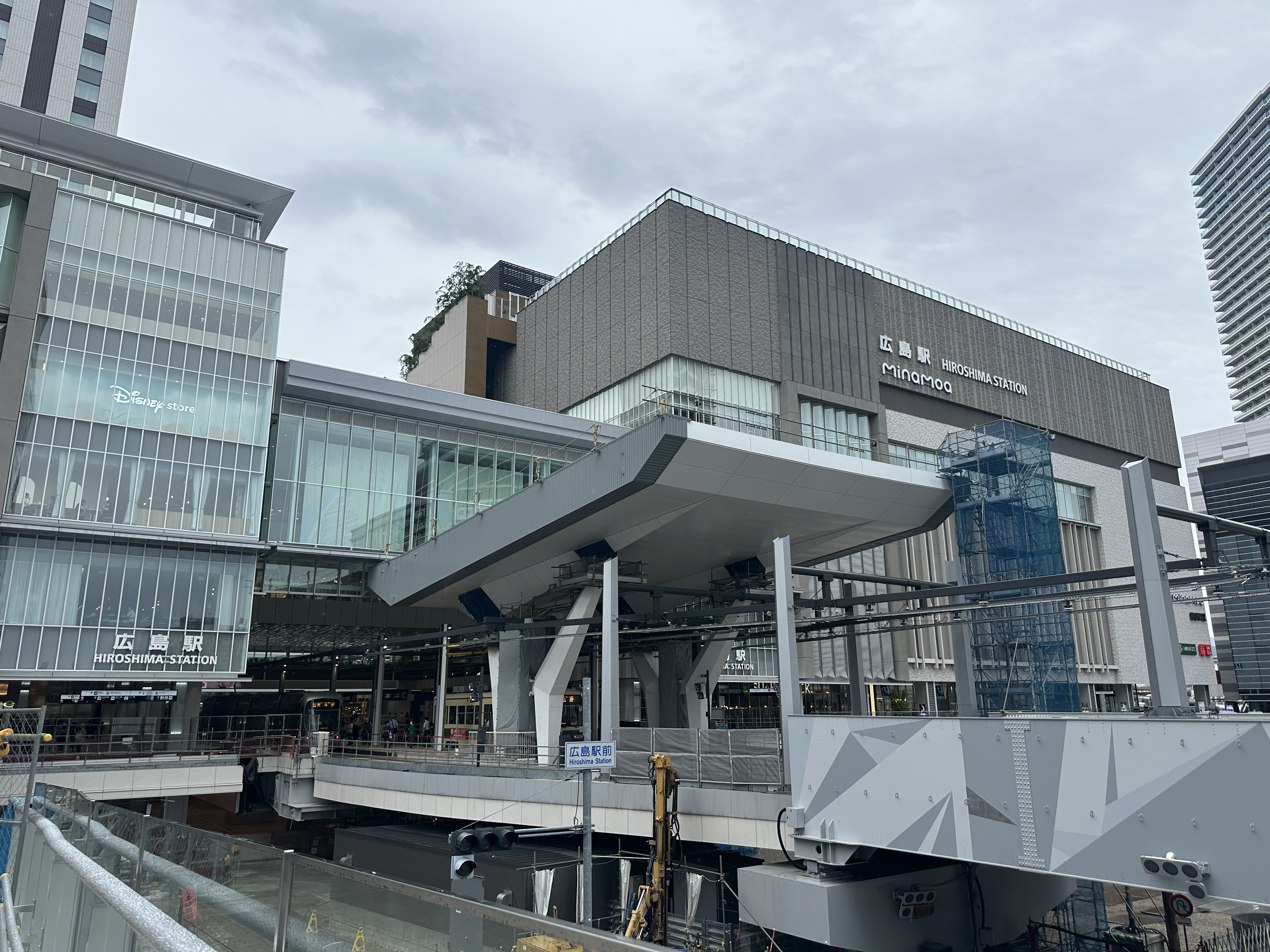
- Station building and tram terminal at South Exit, June 2026

Japanese name
- Shinjitai: 広島駅
- Kyūjitai: 廣島驛
- Hiragana: ひろしまえき

General information
- Location: 2-37 Matsubara-chō; Minami, Hiroshima; Japan
- Operator: JR West
- Lines: San'yō Shinkansen; San'yō Line; Geibi Line
- Connections: Bus terminal; Hiroden

Construction
- Structure type: Elevated (Shinkansen); At grade (conventional lines)

Other information
- Station code: JR-G01; JR-R01; JR-Y01; JR-B01; JR-P01

History
- Opened: 10 June 1894; 132 years ago

Services
Preceding station	JR West	Following station
Shin-Yamaguchi towards Hakata	San'yō Shinkansen Mizuho	Fukuyama towards Shin-Ōsaka
Tokuyama towards Hakata	San'yō Shinkansen Sakura	Fukuyama towards Shin-Ōsaka
Tokuyama towards Hakata	San'yō Shinkansen Nozomi	Fukuyama towards Shin-Ōsaka
Shin-Iwakuni towards Hakata	San'yō Shinkansen Hikari	Mihara towards Shin-Ōsaka
Shin-Iwakuni towards Hakata or Hakataminami	San'yō Shinkansen Kodama	Higashi-Hiroshima towards Shin-Ōsaka
Other services
B G R P Y
Preceding station	JR West	Following station
Shin-Hakushima towards Aki-Kameyama	Kabe Line Rapid	Yano towards Hiro
Miyajimaguchi towards Shimonoseki	San'yō Line West Express Ginga	Saijo towards Osaka
Terminus	Geibi Line Local Miyoshi Liner	Yaga towards Miyoshi
Yokogawa towards Iwakuni	San'yō Line City Liner	Terminus
Shin-Hakushima towards Iwakuni	San'yō Line Rapid	Kaitaichi towards Mihara
Shin-Hakushima towards Iwakuni	San'yō Line Local	Tenjingawa towards Mihara
Terminus	Kure Line Rapid	Yano towards Mihara
Terminus	Kure Line Akiji Liner	Kaitaichi towards Mihara
Terminus	Kure Line etSETOra	Kure towards Onomichi
Terminus	Kure Line Local	Tenjingawa towards Mihara
Location
- Location within Hiroshima Prefecture Location within Japan

Hiroshima Station (広島駅, Hiroshima-eki) is a major railway station in Minami-ku, Hiroshima, Japan, operated by West Japan Railway Company (JR West). Hiroshima Station is the terminal station for several lines, and all San'yō Shinkansen trains stop here.

== Station layout ==
Hiroshima Station has two main entrances: the north — or Shinkansen — entrance, and the south entrance. Until the 1975 opening of the Shinkansen service, the Shinkansen entrance was called the "north entrance", and many local residents, newspapers, and real estate advertisements continue to refer to it as the "north entrance".

A pedestrian tunnel connects the area in front of the Shinkansen entrance to an underground plaza underneath the south entrance to Hiroshima Station. The tunnel includes many gift shops and restaurants, as well as two exits to Fukuya, one to the Hiroshima Station Tram Stop, one in front of the Hiroshima Higashi Post Office, and one directly in front of the south entrance to Hiroshima Station.

Elevator and escalator access is available for several of the entrances. Events are sometimes held in the large area of the underground plaza in front of the entrance to Fukuya.

Prior to 2017, the south entrance connected the plaza outside directly to the platform for track 1; passengers wishing to access any other track from the south entrance were forced to first enter onto the track 1 platform and then ascend to the concourse above. Similarly, passengers wishing to exit the south entrance after arriving on any other platform were forced to descend from the concourse level to the track 1 platform to exit. To eliminate this bottleneck, the concourse level was expanded and a new south entrance was added slightly to the east of the old one. This design, which is standard for major Japanese rail stations, enables direct access to the concourse level from the south entrance. The new south section of the station was opened on May 28, 2017, and the old south entrance is now under construction. The new south exit and Hiroden platforms will be completely rebuilt. It is planned to reopen in 2025. The south exit is still usable, but often gets rerouted.

=== Platforms ===
The Shinkansen station has two island platforms which serve a total of four tracks. The non-Shinkansen lines use three island platforms and one side platform serving eight tracks.

1/2	R San'yō Main Line	for Miyajimaguchi, Iwakuni, and Tokuyama
1/2	B Kabe Line	for Ōmachi, Midorii, and Kabe
3/4	Y Kure Line	for Kure, Hiro, and Takehara
3/4	B Kabe Line	for Ōmachi, Midorii, and Kabe
3/4	R San'yō Main Line	for Miyajimaguchi, Iwakuni, and Tokuyama
3/4	G San'yō Main Line	for Saijō, Mihara, and Fukuyama
5–7	G San'yō Main Line	for Saijō, Mihara, and Fukuyama
5–7	Y Kure Line	for Kure, Hiro, and Takehara
8/9	P Geibi Line	for Shiwaguchi and Miyoshi
11/12	San'yō Shinkansen	for Shin-Yamaguchi, Hakata, Kumamoto, and Kagoshima-Chūō
13/14	San'yō Shinkansen	for Okayama, Shin-Ōsaka, and Tokyo

Other tracks:

- 0: formerly a platform for the Ujina Line
- 10: formerly a platform for freight services
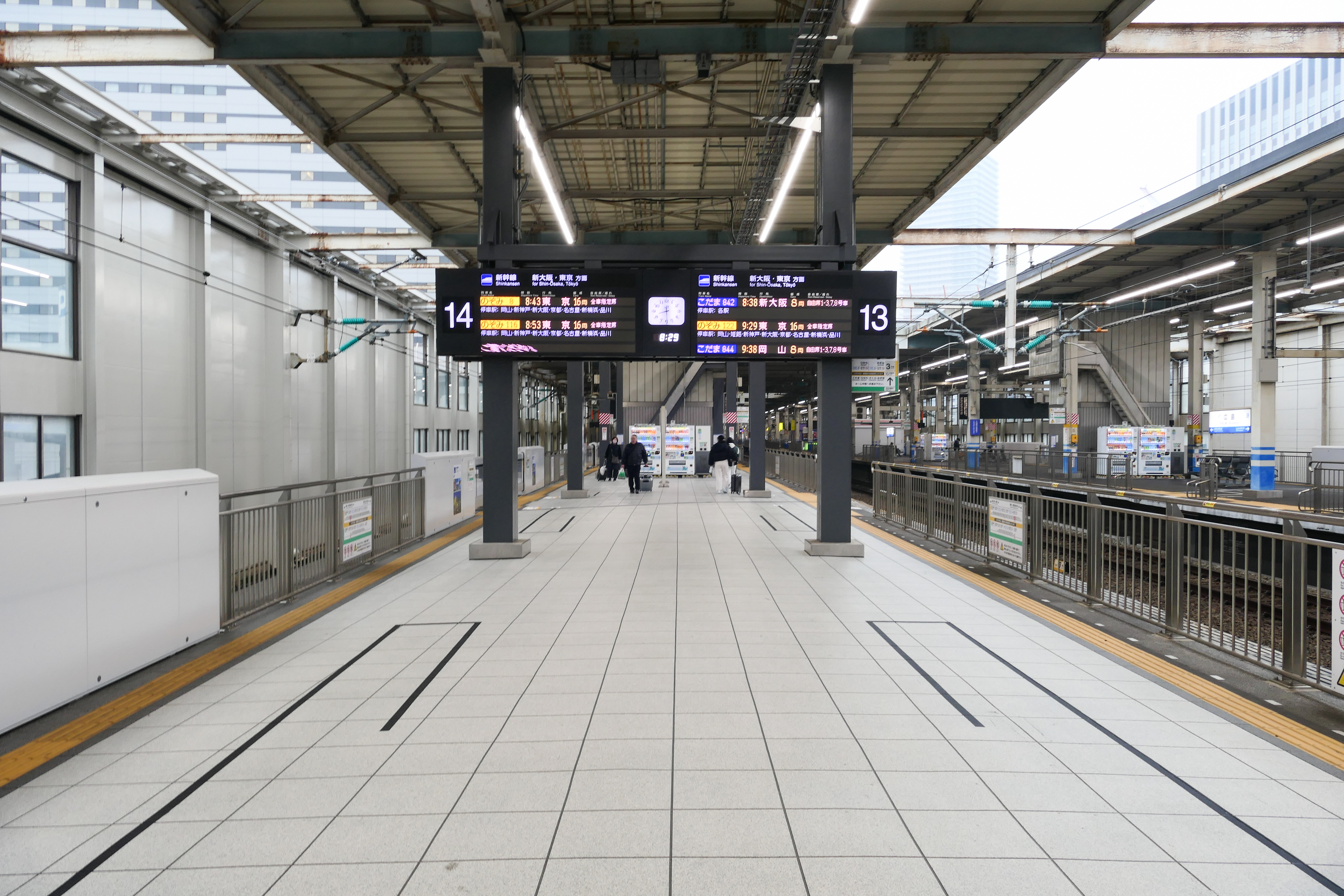
Platforms 13 and 14 for Shinkansens, in December 2023

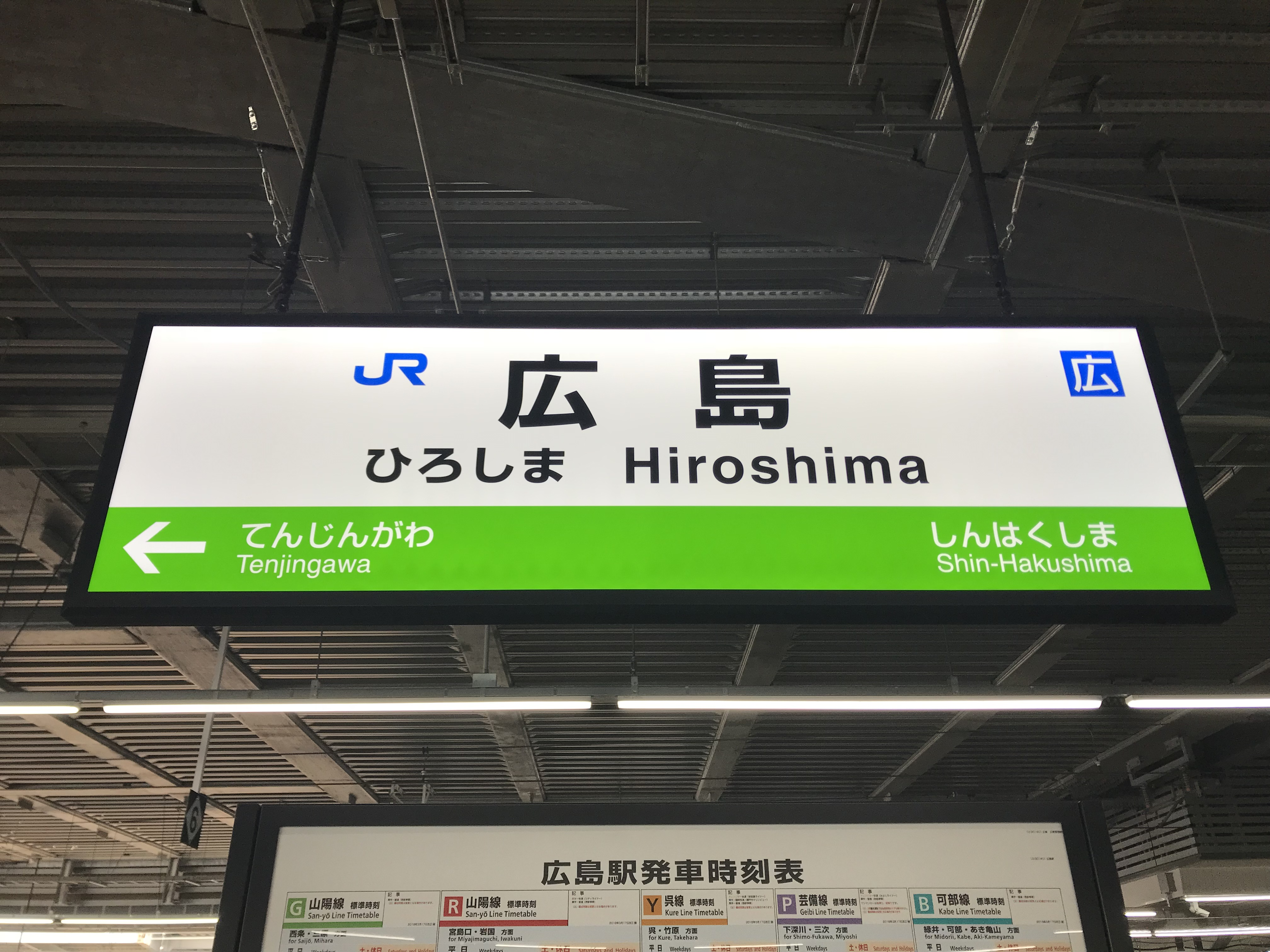
Platform sign at Hiroshima Station, between Tenjingawa and Shin-Hakushima Stations

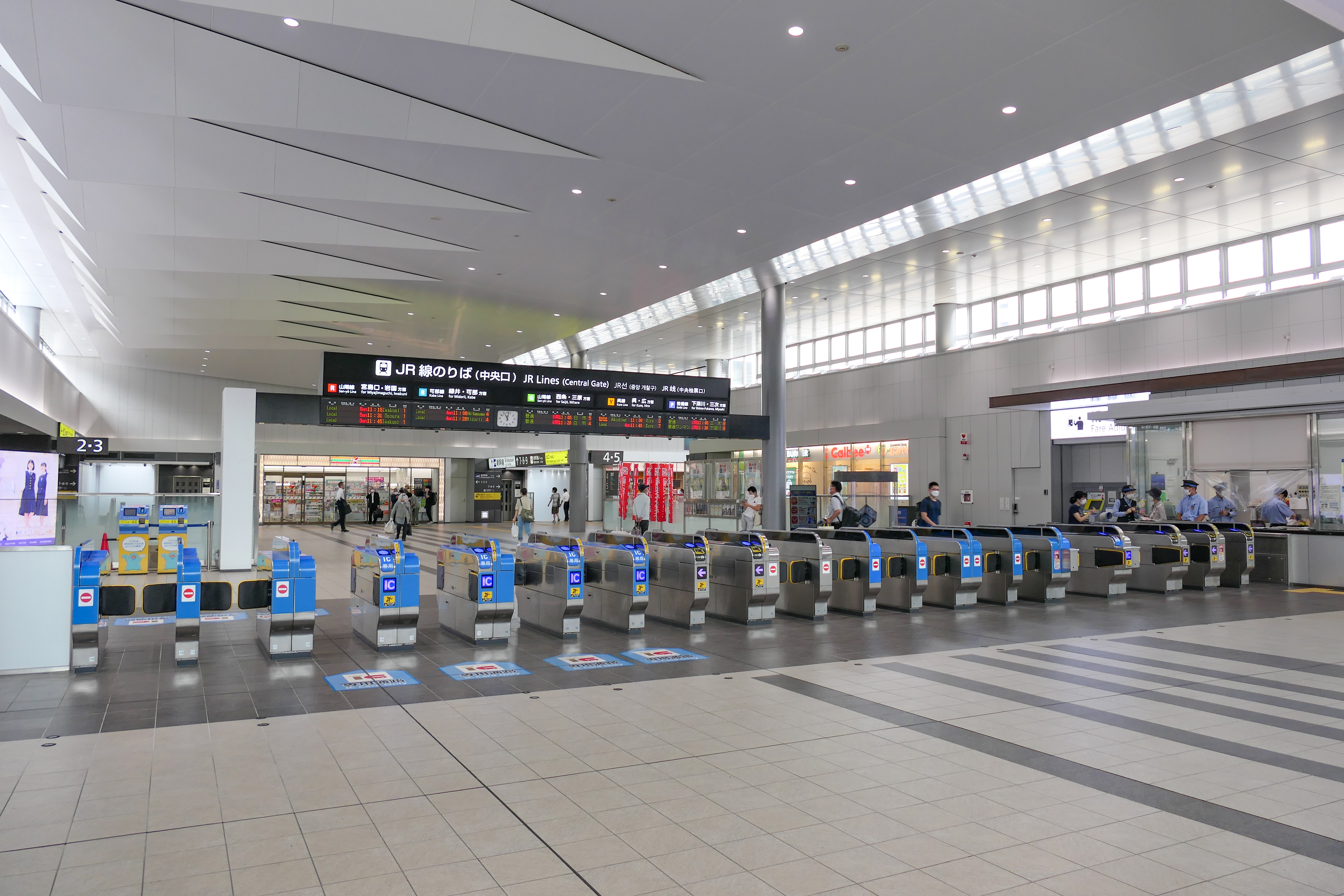
Central Gate for conventional lines, in 2022

=== Hiroden ===
Hiroshima Station 広島駅
- Train hall, November 2025

General information
- Location: Matsubara-cho; Minami, Hiroshima; Japan
- Operator: Hiroshima Electric Railway
- Line: Hiroden Main Line
- Tracks: 4

Other information
- Station code: M01

History
- Opened: 23 November 1912
Location

The Hiroshima Station tram stop (広島駅電停, Hiroshima-eki dentei) is a terminal station of the Main Line of Hiroshima Electric Railway, located on the second floor of the main JR station building "minamoa", directly level with the JR concourse. It has four tracks, one for each of the four routes serving the station, with Spanish solution platforms for the three longer tracks. The elevated station opened on August 3, 2025. Previously the terminal was located at ground level in front of the station building.

==== Routes ====
- Hiroshima Station - Hiroshima Port Route
- Hiroshima Station - Hiroden-miyajima-guchi Route
- Hiroshima Station - (via Hijiyama-shita) - Hiroshima Port Route
- Hiroshima Station - Eba Route

==== Connections ====
█ Main Line

Hiroshima Station — Inari-machi

==== History ====
- Opened as "Honeki-mae" tram stop on November 23, 1912.
- Renamed to "Hiroshima-ekimae" on March 30, 1960.
- Renamed to "Hiroshima-eki" as the present name "Hiroshima Station", on December 1, 2001.
- Moved to the second floor of the JR station building "minamoa" on August 3, 2025.
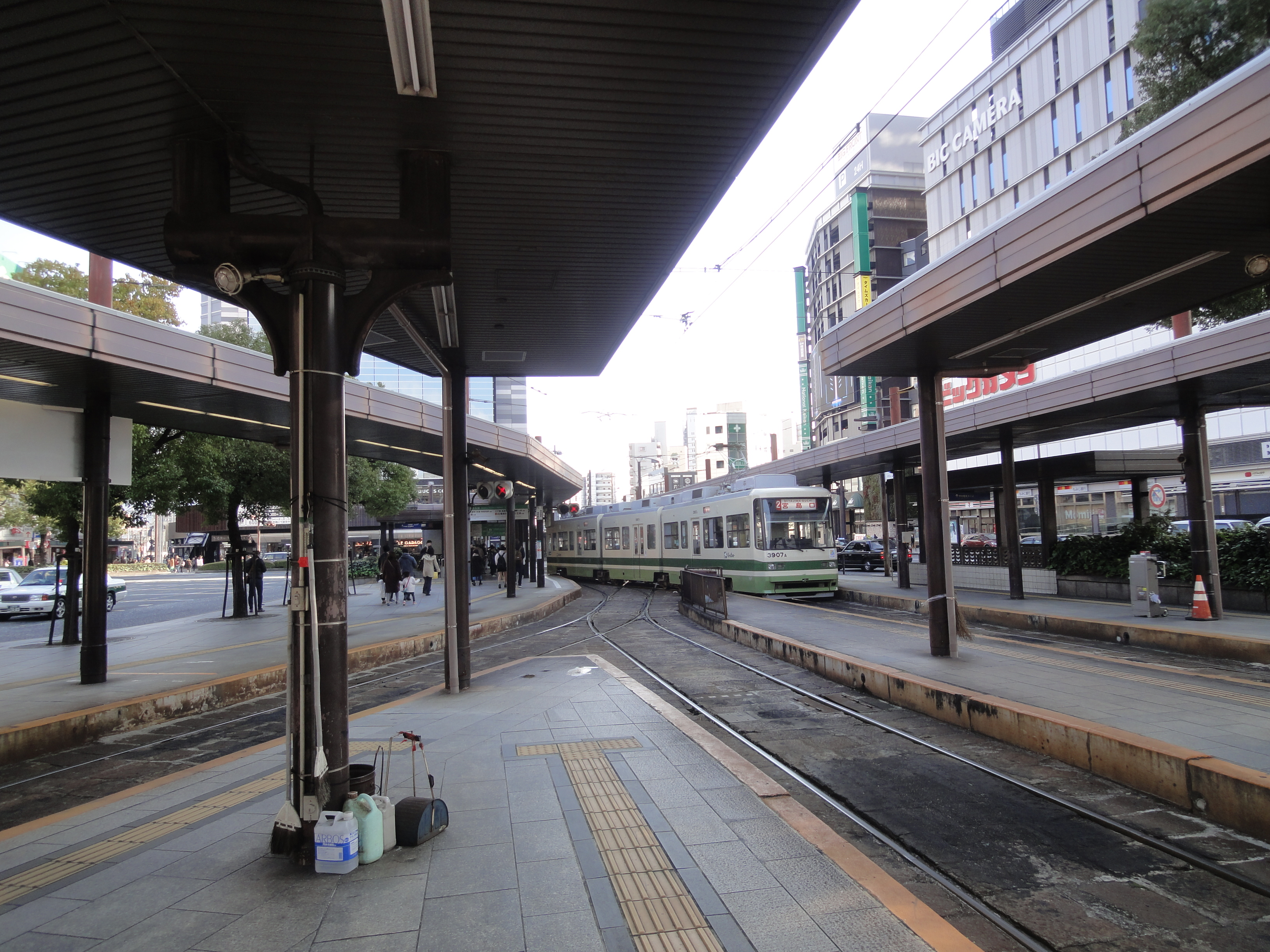
Former ground-level Hiroden terminal, in January 2020

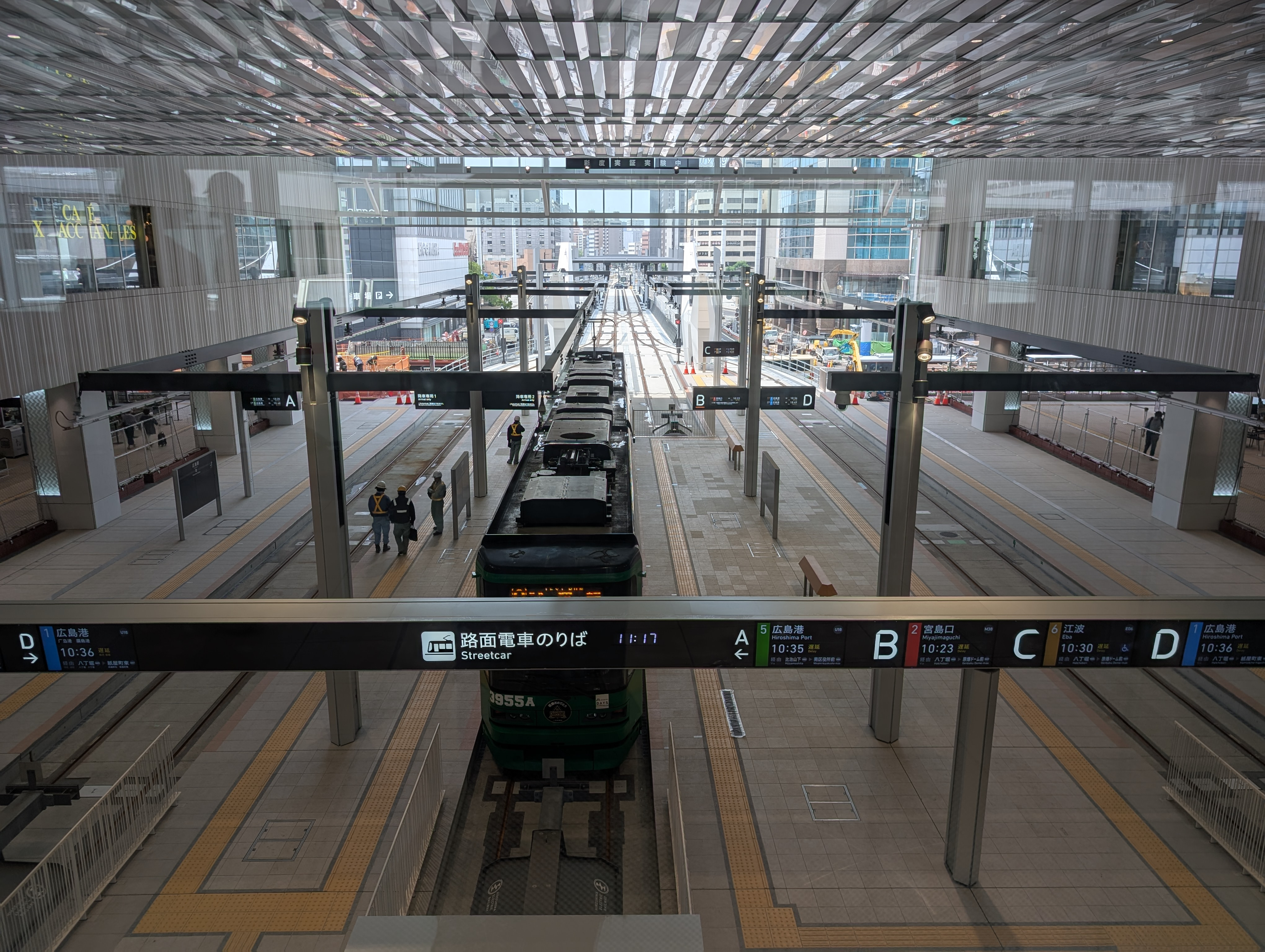
New Hiroden terminal under testing, July 2025

== History ==
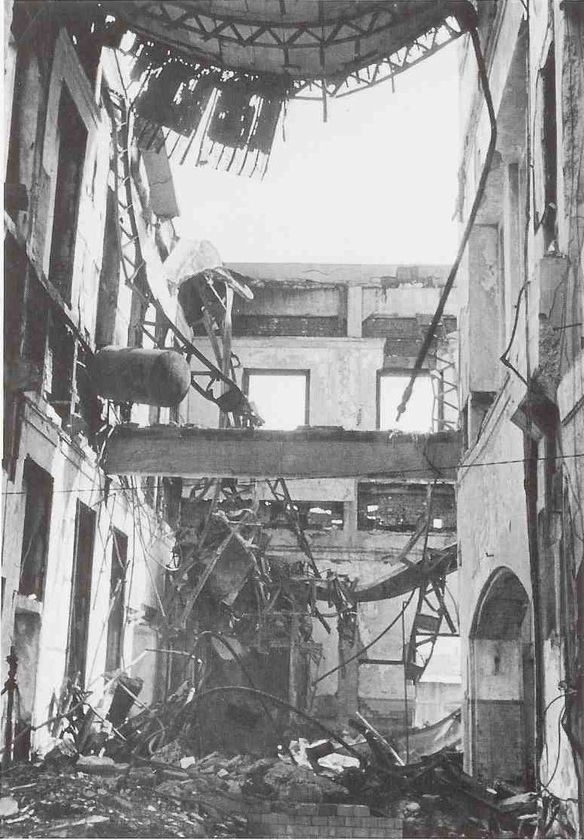
Hiroshima Station in October 1945, showing the damage caused by the atomic bomb

- Opened as a station of the Sanyo Railway and started both passenger and freight services between Itozaki Station on June 10, 1894.
- Opened the train services between Tokuyama Station on September 25, 1897.
- Nationalized as the station of the Japan National Railways on December 1, 1906.
- Opened Hiroden "Hon-ekimae", a stop in front of Hiroshima Station on November 23, 1912.
- Station building was destroyed in the atomic bombing on August 6, 1945.
- The Hiroden stop in front of the Hiroshima Station is renamed "Hiroshima Ekimae" on March 30, 1960.
- Completed the current station building and called "Hiroshima Minshu Eki" (Hiroshima the people's Station) in December 1965.
- Freight services transferred to "Higashi Hiroshima Station" (now Hiroshima Freight Terminal) on March 1, 1969.
- Stopped the passenger train services on Ujina Line on March 31, 1972.
- Started the train services on the Sanyō Shinkansen and renamed the north entrance as the "Shinkansen Entrance" on March 10, 1975.
- Privatized and started operation as a station of the JR West on April 1, 1987.
- Redecorated the south entrance and named the building as "ASSE" in April 1999.
- The Hiroden stop in front of Hiroshima Station is renamed "Hiroshima Station Tram Stop" on November 1, 2001.
- The Hiroshima Station Shinkansen entrance begins using automated ticket gates on February 27, 2005.
- Spring 2007: All station entrances began using automated ticket gates
- Summer 2007: The ICOCA card was introduced at Hiroshima Station and all stations within the Hiroshima City Network
- May 2017: The old south entrance was closed and the new south entrance was opened.
- March 2020: The station building “ASSE” has closed and reconstruction has begun.
- March 24, 2025: The new station building, "minamoa", opens.
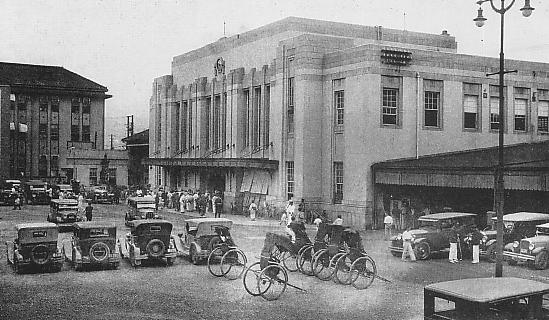
Second station building (1912–1964)

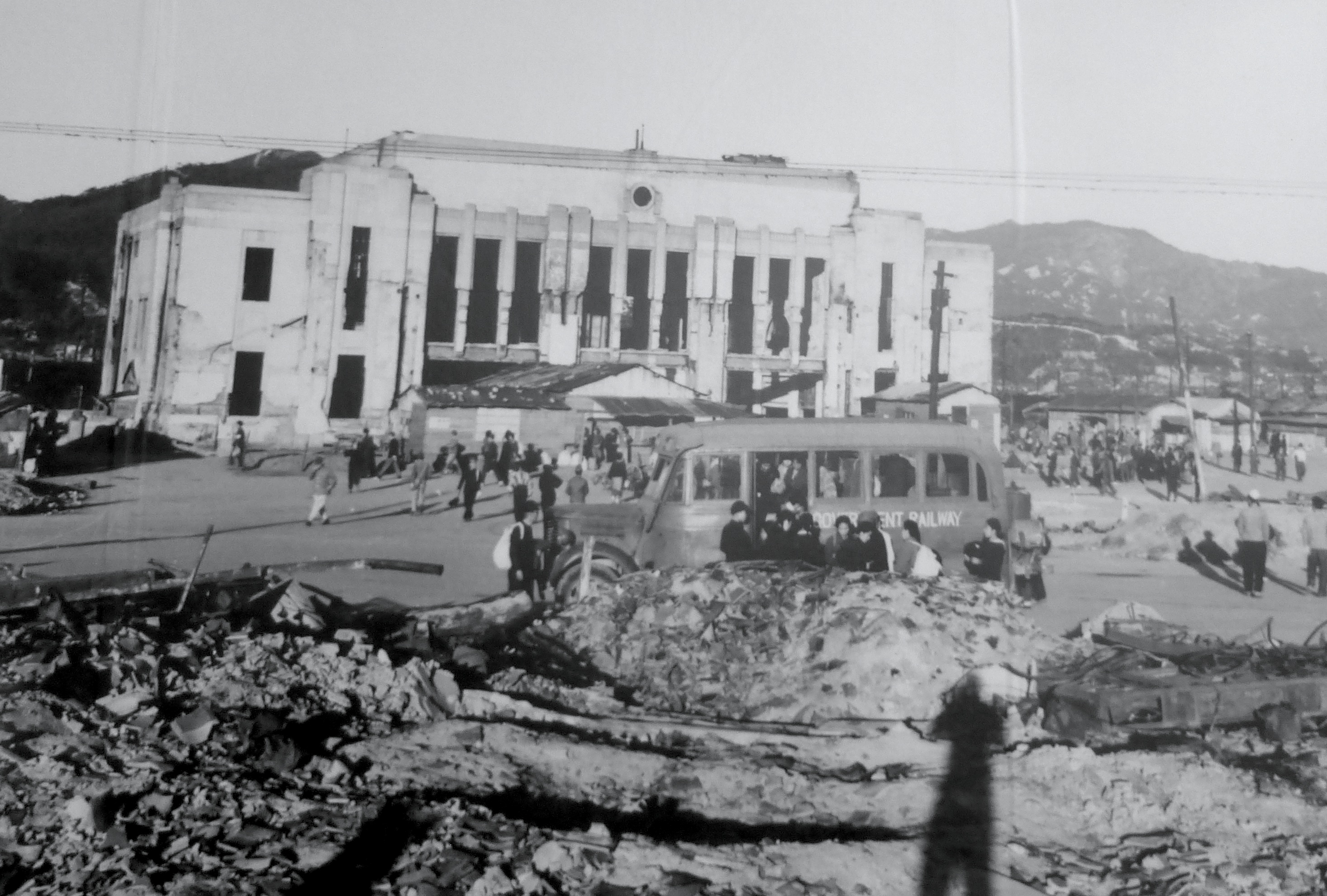
Station front after atomic bomb, in 1945

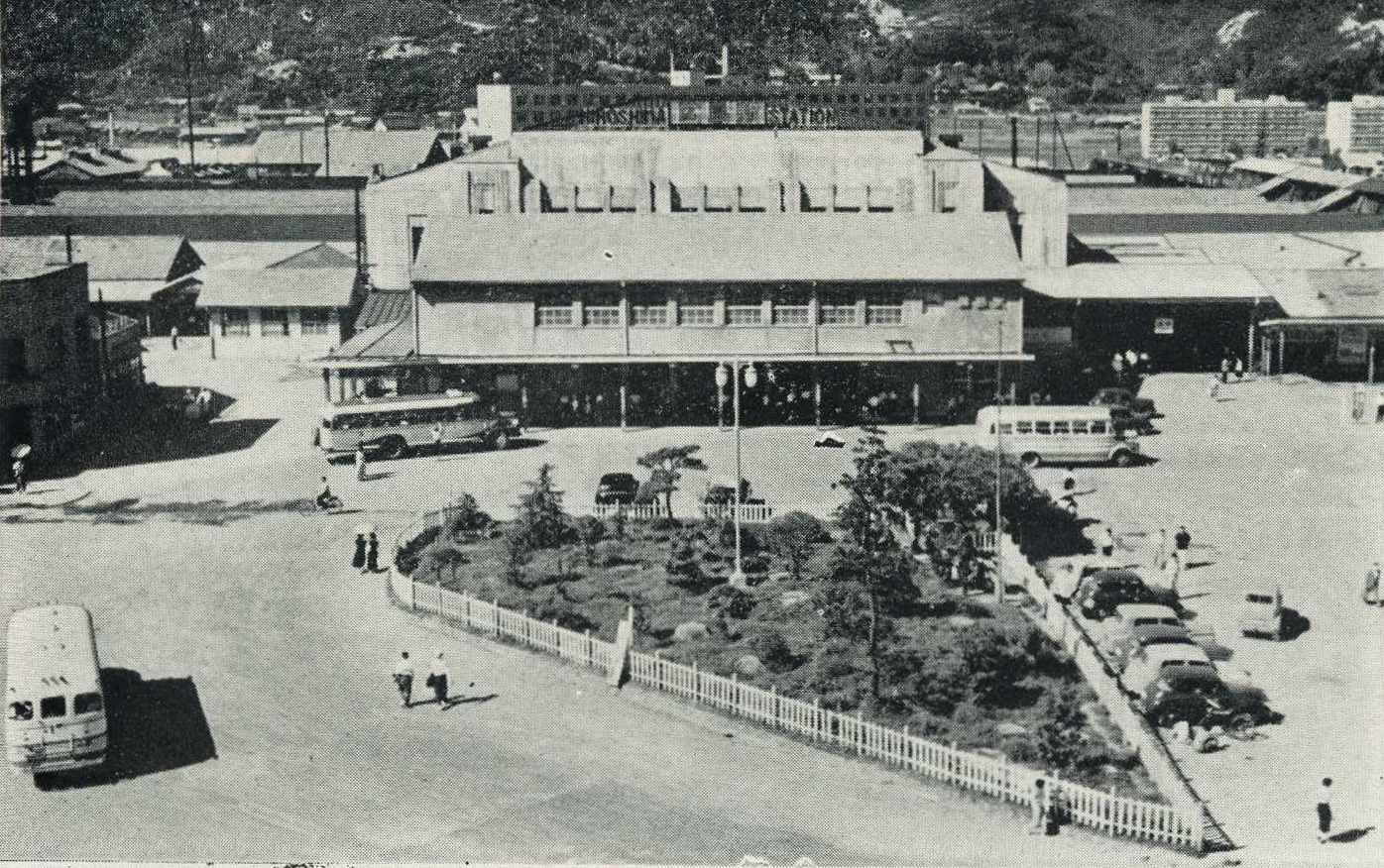
Station front in 1955

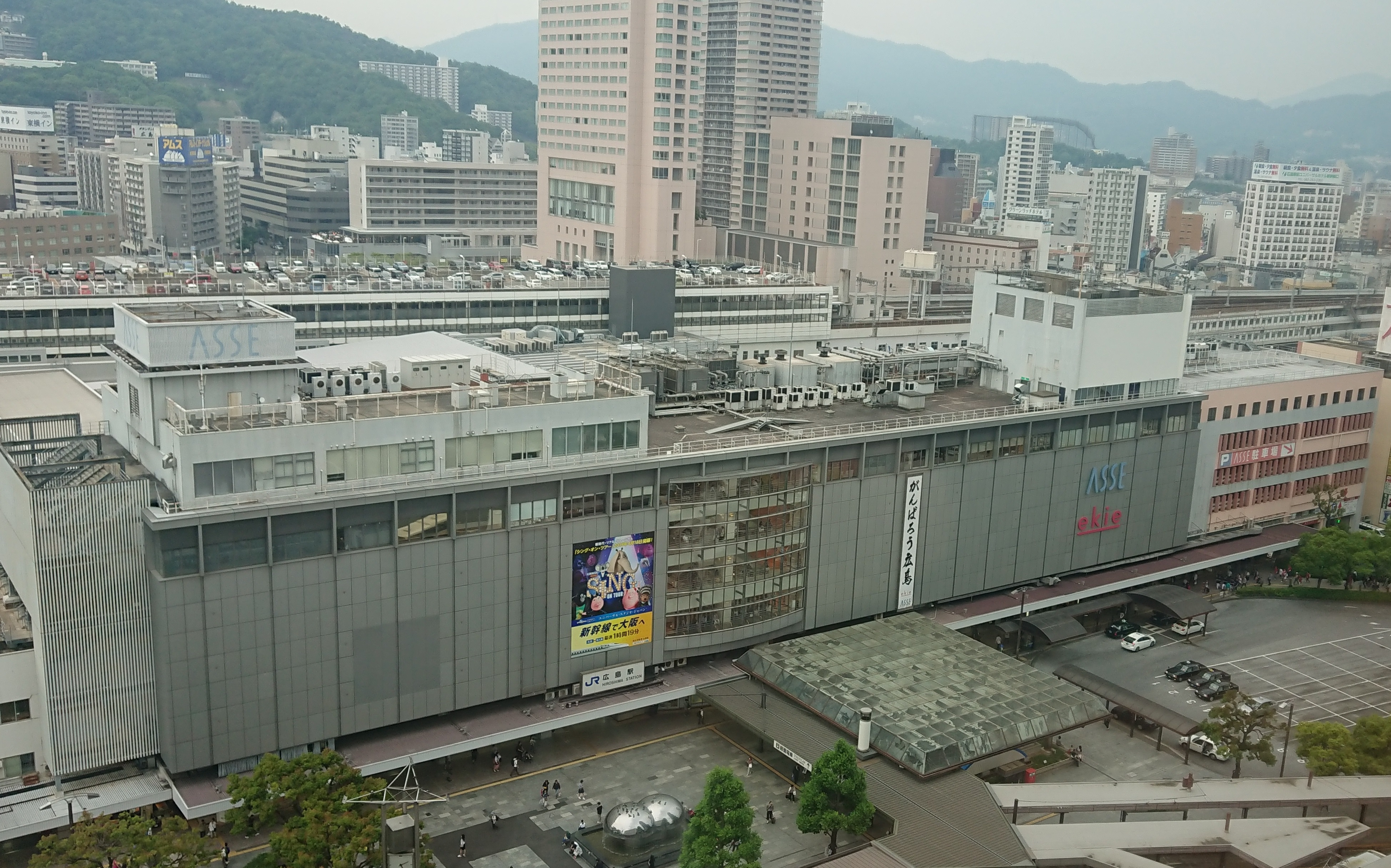
Third station building (1965–2020) in its post-1999 “ASSE” guise, in 2019

== Connecting bus routes ==
=== Chugoku JR Bus ===
Chugoku JR bus services are operated between Hiroshima Station at the "Shinkansen entrance" (North side) and next stations via Hiroshima Bus Center.

- Tokyo Station "Yaesu entrance"
- Yokohama Station
- Nagoya Station and Sakae Bus Terminal
- Kyoto Station "Karasuma entrance"
- Osaka Station "Sakurabashi entrance" and USJ
- Nanba Station and Tennoji Station
- Takamatsu Station
- Hiroshima Airport limousine bus

=== Hiroden Bus ===
Airport limousine bus service is operated from "Shinkansen entrance" (North side).

- Hiroshima Airport limousine bus

Other bus services are operated from "Shinkansen entrance" and "Minami entrance" (South side).

=== Hiroshima Bus ===
Airport limousine bus service is operated from "Shinkansen entrance" (North side).

- Hiroshima Airport Limousine bus

Other bus services are operated from "Minami entrance" (South side).

=== Geiyo Bus ===
Airport limousine bus service is operated from "Shinkansen entrance" (North side).

- Hiroshima Airport Limousine bus

Other bus services are operated from "Minami entrance" (South side).

- Tadanoumi Station, Onori Station, Takehara Station
- Mihara Station
- Saijo Station

=== Hiroshima Kotsu ===
Airport limousine bus service is operated from "Shinkansen entrance" (North side).

- Hiroshima Airport Limousine bus

Other bus services are operated from "Minami entrance" (South side).

== Highway access ==
- Japan National Route 54
- Hiroshima Prefectural Route 37 (Hiroshima-Miyoshi Route)
- Hiroshima Prefectural Route 70 (Hiroshima-Nakashima Route)
- Hiroshima Prefectural Route 84 (Higashi Kaita Hiroshima Route)
- Hiroshima Prefectural Route 164 (Hiroshima-Kaita Route)
- Hiroshima Prefectural Route 264 (Nakayama-Onaga Route)

== Surrounding area ==
Hatchobori and Kamiyacho, the center of Hiroshima City, and Hiroshima Peace Memorial Park are located on the south exit side.

=== South ===
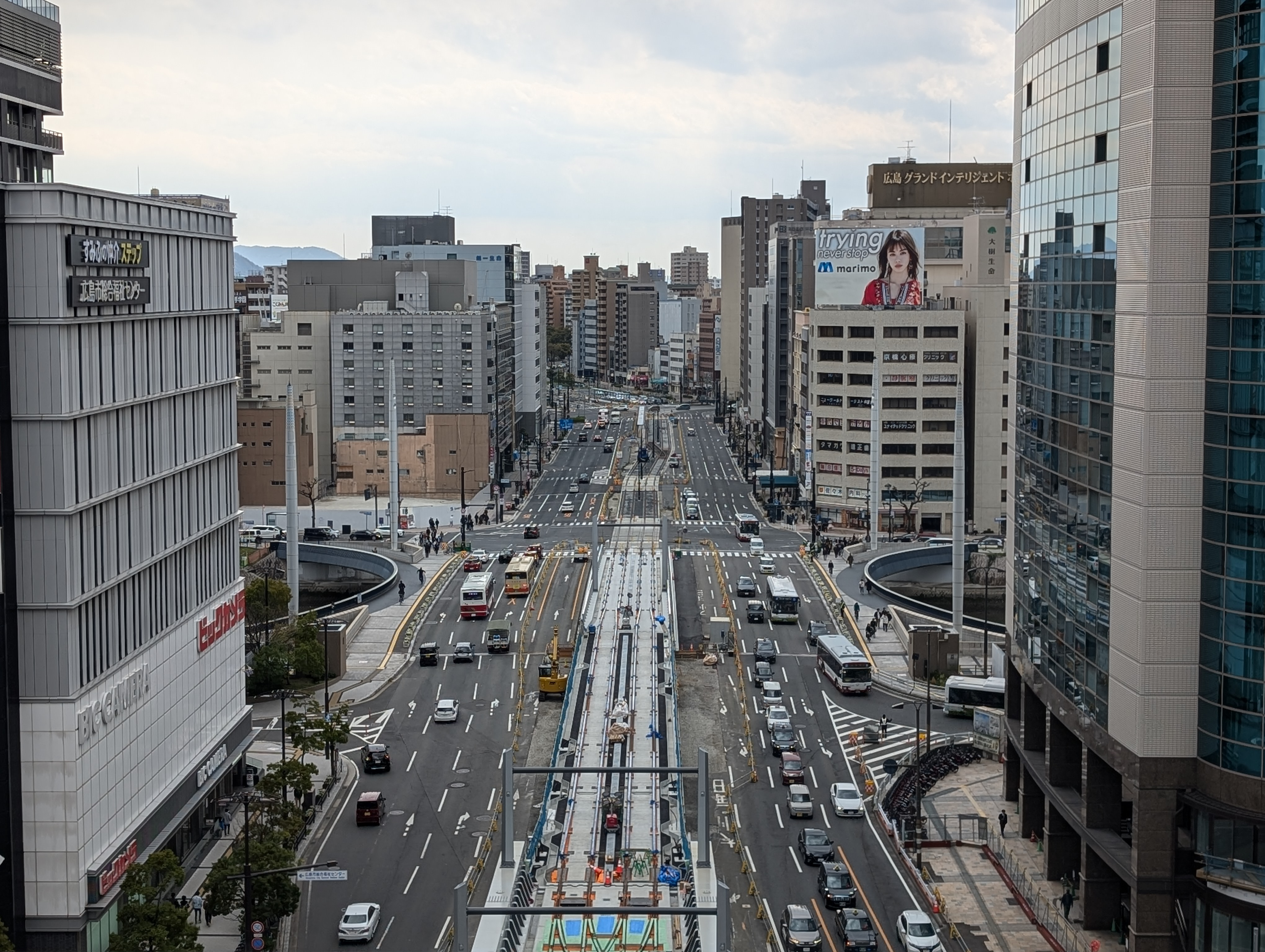
View of Ekimae-Ōdōri and the cityscape southwest from the rooftop of minamoa (March 2025)

- minamoa - the station building
- Yale Yale A-kan - Fukuya Hiroshima Ekimae Store
- Hiroshima JP building - "Hiroshima JP building Post Office" is located here.
- Grand Cross Tower Hiroshima - Edion Tsutaya Electrics
- City Tower Hiroshima - Bic Camera and Hotel Kawashima
- Hiroshima City Noboricho Junior High School - Sadako Sasaki was enrolled here
- Mazda Stadium
- Shukkei-en

=== North ===
- Hotel Granvia Hiroshima
- Sheraton Grand Hotel Hiroshima
- Hiroshima Tōshō-gū
- Hiroshima General Hospital of West Japan Railway
- Hiroshima Television Head Office
- Hiroshima Higashi Ward Office
- Hiroshima City Higashi Ward Library
- Onaga Elementary School
- Futaba Junior High school
- Setouchi High School

== See also ==
- Hiroden lines and routes
