= Kure Station =

Railway station in Kure, Hiroshima Prefecture, Japan

Kure Station 呉駅
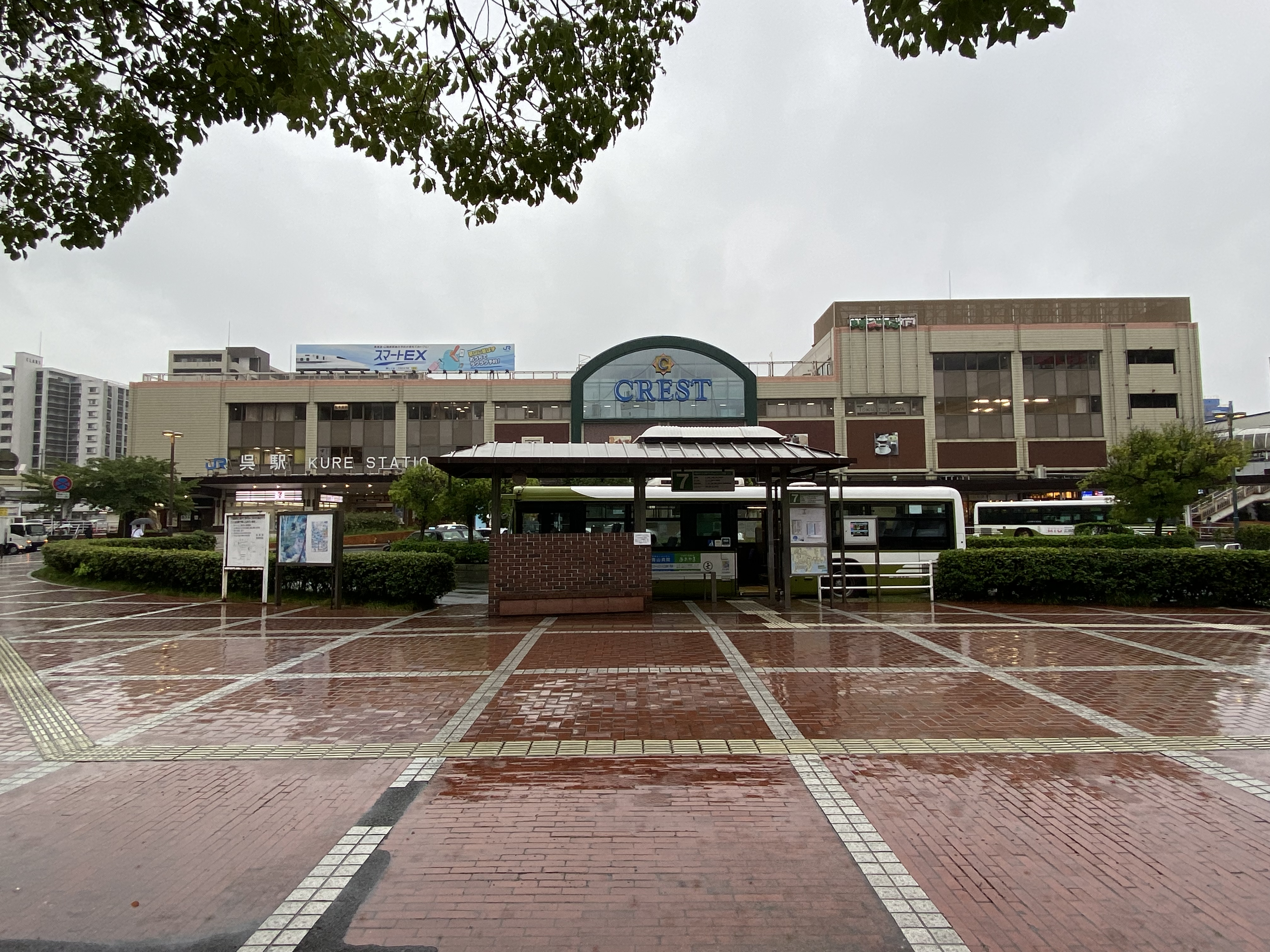
- Kure Station, September 2021

General information
- Location: 1 Takaramachi, Kure-shi, Hiroshima-ken 737-0029; Japan
- Coordinates: 34°14′41.28″N 132°33′27.56″E
- Owner: West Japan Railway Company
- Operator: West Japan Railway Company
- Line: Y Kure Line
- Distance: 67.0 km (41.6 miles) from Mihara
- Platforms: 1 side + 1 island platform
- Tracks: 2
- Connections: Bus stop

Construction
- Structure type: Elevated level
- Cycle facilities: Yes
- Accessible: No

Other information
- Status: Staffed (Midori no Madoguchi)
- Station code: JR-Y14
- Website: Official website

History
- Opened: 27 December 1903

Passengers
- FY2019: 10,548

Services
Preceding station	JR West	Following station
Saka towards Hiroshima	Kure Line Rapid Akiji Liner	Terminus
Yano towards Hiroshima	Kure Line Rapid	Terminus
Kawaraishi towards Hiroshima	Kure Line Local	Akiaga towards Mihara
Location
- Location within Hiroshima Prefecture Location within Japan

Kure Station (呉駅, Kure-eki) is a passenger railway station located in the city of Kure, Hiroshima Prefecture, Japan. It is operated by the West Japan Railway Company (JR West).

== Lines ==
Kure Station is served by the JR West Kure Line, and is located 67.0 kilometers from the terminus of the line at Mihara.

== Station layout ==
The station consists of one side platform and one island platform, connected by an elevated station building.The station has a Midori no Madoguchi staffed ticket office.

== Platforms ==
1	■ Y Kure Line	for Hiro and Mihara
2, 3	■ Y Kure Line	for Hiroshima

== History ==
Kure Station was opened on 27 December 1903. The station was completely destroyed by fire in the Kure Air Raid on 2 July 1945. The current station building opened on 7 July 1981. With the privatization of the Japanese National Railways (JNR) on 1 April 1987, the station came under the control of JR West.

== Passenger statistics ==
In fiscal 2019, the station was used by an average of 10,548 passengers daily.

== Surrounding area ==
- Babcock-Hitachi K.K
- Yamato Museum
- Kure Port
- Kure University - Kure Station Campus, Extension Center
- Kure City Hall

== See also ==
- List of railway stations in Japan
