= Itozaki Station =

Railway station in Mihara, Hiroshima Prefecture, Japan

Itozaki Station 糸崎駅
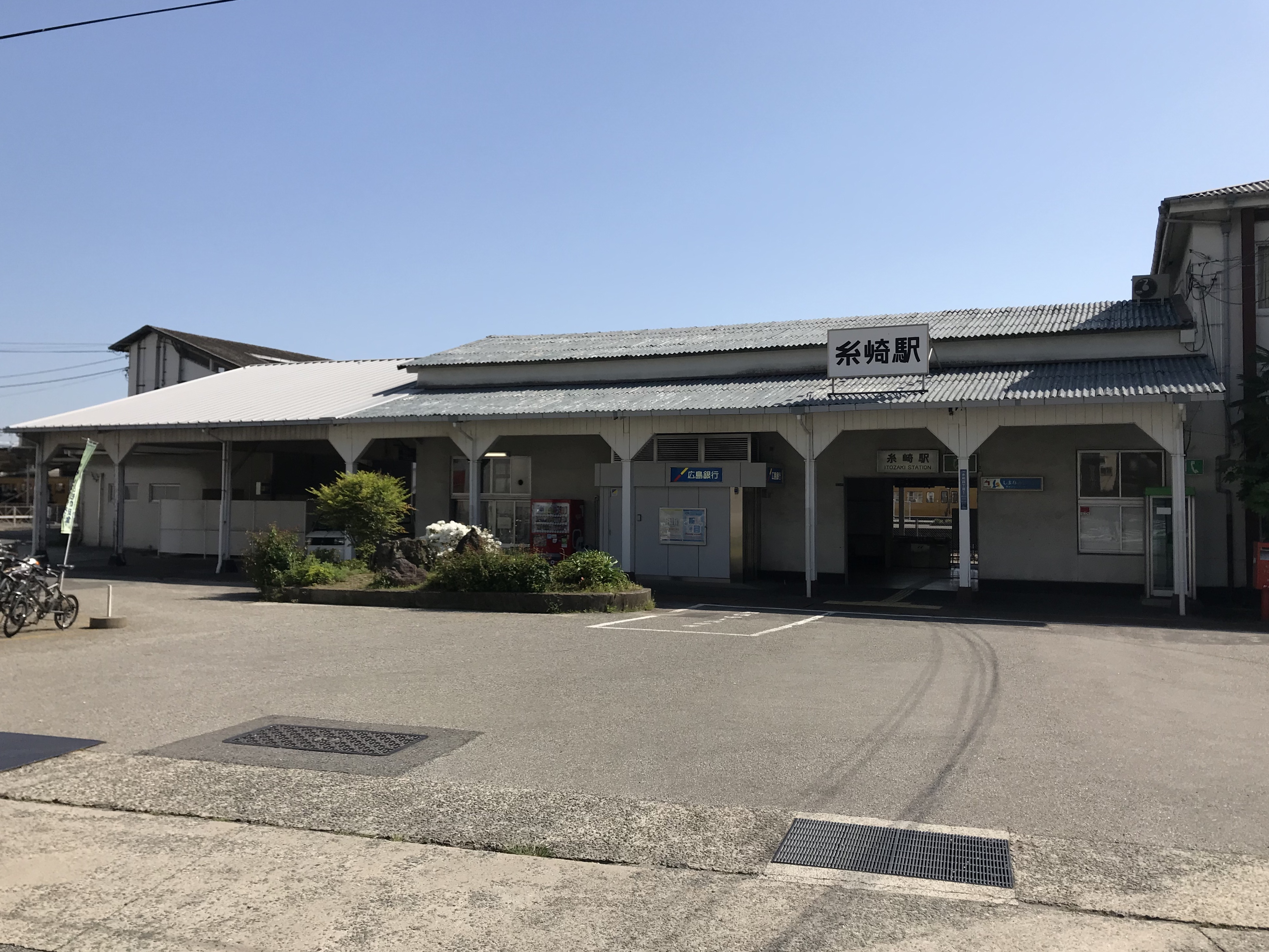
- Itozaki Station in 2018

General information
- Location: 4-chōme-1 Itosaki, Mihara-shi, Hiroshima-ken 729-0324; Japan
- Coordinates: 34°23′32.74″N 133°6′15.54″E
- Owner: West Japan Railway Company
- Operator: West Japan Railway Company; Japan Freight Railway Company
- Lines: G Sanyō Main Line; X Sanyō Main Line
- Distance: 230.9 km (143.5 miles) from Kobe
- Platforms: 2 island platforms
- Tracks: 2
- Connections: Bus stop

Construction
- Accessible: Yes

Other information
- Status: Unstaffed
- Station code: JR-X19 / JR-G17
- Website: Official website

History
- Opened: 20 July 1892
- Former names: Mihara (until 1894)

Passengers
- FY2019: 676

Services
Preceding station	JR West	Following station
Mihara Terminus	San'yō Line Local	Onomichi towards Fukuyama
Location
- Location within Hiroshima Prefecture Location within Japan

Itozaki Station (糸崎駅, Itozaki-eki) is a passenger railway station located in the city of Mihara, Hiroshima Prefecture, Japan. It is operated by the West Japan Railway Company (JR West). It is also a freight depot for the Japan Freight Railway Company (JR Freight)

== Lines ==
Itozaki Station is served by the JR West Sanyō Main Line, and is located 230.9 kilometers from the terminus of the line at Kobe.

== Station layout ==
The station consists of two ground-level island platforms connected by a footbridge. The station has been unstaffed since March 2020. There are many sidings in the south of the station.

== Platforms ==
1, 2	■ G Sanyō Main Line	for Onomichi and Fukuyama
3, 4	■ G X Sanyō Main Line	for Mihara and Hiroshima for Takehara and Kure

== History ==
Itozaki Station was opened as the terminus of the Sanyō Railway on 20 July 1892 as Mihara Station (三原駅, Mihara-eki) when the line was extended from Onomichi to this station.. It was renamed 10 June 1894 when the line was further extended to Hiroshima Station. With the privatization of the Japanese National Railways (JNR) on 1 April 1987, the station came under the control of JR West.

== Passenger statistics ==
In fiscal 2019, the station was used by an average of 676 passengers daily.

== Surrounding area ==
- Onomichi Itozaki Port
- Mitsubishi Heavy Industries Machinery Systems Co., Ltd. Mihara Plant
- Japan National Route 185

== See also ==
- List of railway stations in Japan
