= Mihara Station =

Railway station in Mihara, Hiroshima Prefecture, Japan

G 16 Y 31 X 20 Mihara Station 三原駅
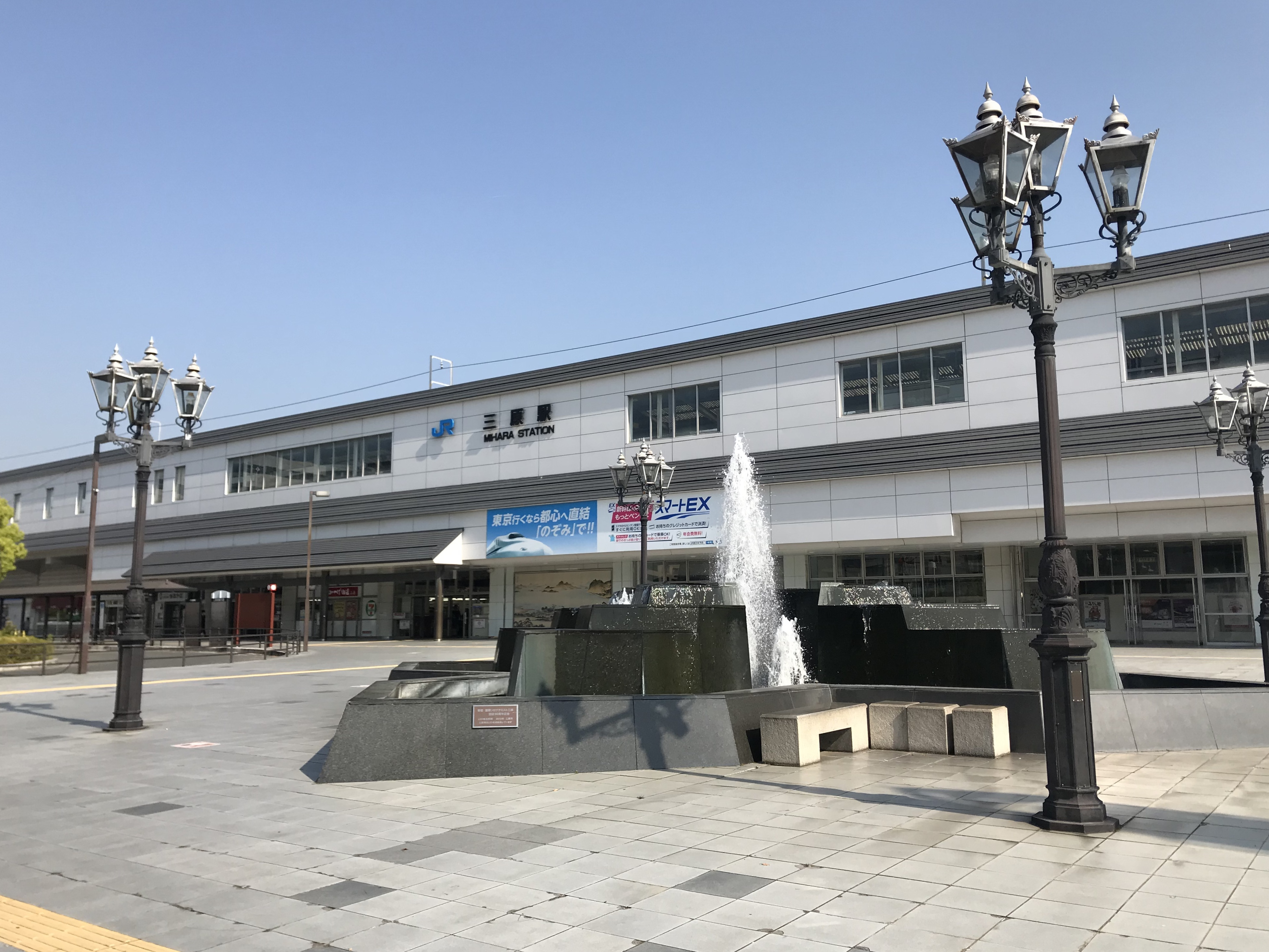
- Mihara Station in 2018

General information
- Location: 1-1-1 Shiromachi, Mihara-shi, Hiroshima-ken 723-0014; Japan
- Coordinates: 34°24′2.4″N 133°4′59.5″E
- Owner: West Japan Railway Company
- Operator: West Japan Railway Company
- Lines: San'yō Shinkansen; G Sanyō Main Line; X Sanyō Main Line; Y Kure Line
- Distance: 233.3 km (145.0 miles) from Kobe
- Platforms: 2 side + 2 island platforms
- Tracks: 4 (Local lines); 2 (Shinkansen)
- Connections: Bus stop

Construction
- Structure type: Elevated
- Accessible: Yes

Other information
- Status: Staffed (Midori no Madoguchi)
- Station code: JR-G16, JR-Y31, JR-X20
- Website: Official website

History
- Opened: 10 June 1894; 132 years ago

Passengers
- FY2019: 6230

Services
Preceding station	JR West	Following station
Hiroshima towards Hakata	San'yō Shinkansen Hikari	Fukuyama towards Shin-Ōsaka
Higashi-Hiroshima towards Hakata or Hakataminami	San'yō Shinkansen Kodama	Shin-Onomichi towards Shin-Ōsaka
Sunami towards Hiroshima	Kure Line Local	Terminus
Hongō towards Hiroshima	San'yō Line Rapid	Terminus
Hongō towards Hiroshima	San'yō Line Local	Itozaki Terminus
Saijo towards Shimonoseki	San'yō Line West Express Ginga	Fukuyama towards Osaka
Location
- Location within Hiroshima Prefecture Location within Japan

Mihara Station (三原駅, Mihara-eki) is a passenger railway station located in the city of Mihara, Hiroshima Prefecture, Japan. It is operated by the West Japan Railway Company (JR West). It is also a freight depot for the Japan Freight Railway Company (JR Freight)

== Lines ==
Mihara Station is served by the Sanyō Shinkansen and is 245.6 kilometers from Shin-Osaka and 761.0 kilometers from Tokyo. It is also JR West Sanyō Main Line, and is located 233.3 kilometers from the terminus of the line at Kobe. Mihara Station is also the eastern terminus of the 93.4 kilometer Kure Line to Hiroshima.

== Station layout ==
The station consists of two elevated side platforms for Shinkansen services and two elevated island platforms for conventional lines. There is only one ticket gate for conventional lines on the first floor of the station building, and there is no ticket gate dedicated to Shinkansen. When using the Shinkansen, it is necessary to pass through the transfer gates, and enter the conventional line concourse. The station has a Midori no Madoguchi staffed ticket office. A Shinkansen track maintenance section has been set up near the outbound tracks of this station.

== Platforms ==
1	■ Y Kure Line	for Takehara
2	■ G San'yo Main Line	for Saijō
3, 4	■ G X Sanyō Main Line	for Fukuyama

6	■ San'yō Shinkansen	for Hiroshima
7	■ San'yō Shinkansen	for Okayama

== History ==
Itozaki Station was opened as the terminus of the Sanyō Railway on 10 June 1894 when the line was extended to Hiroshima Station. With the privatization of the Japanese National Railways (JNR) on 1 April 1987, the station came under the control of JR West.

== Passenger statistics ==
In fiscal 2019, the station was used by an average of 6203 passengers daily.

== Surrounding area ==
- Mihara Castle ruins
- Mihara City Hall
- Hiroshima University Mihara Elementary/Junior High School

== See also ==
- List of railway stations in Japan
