= Hiroshima =

City in Chūgoku, Japan

Hiroshima 広島市
- Prefecture capital and Designated city
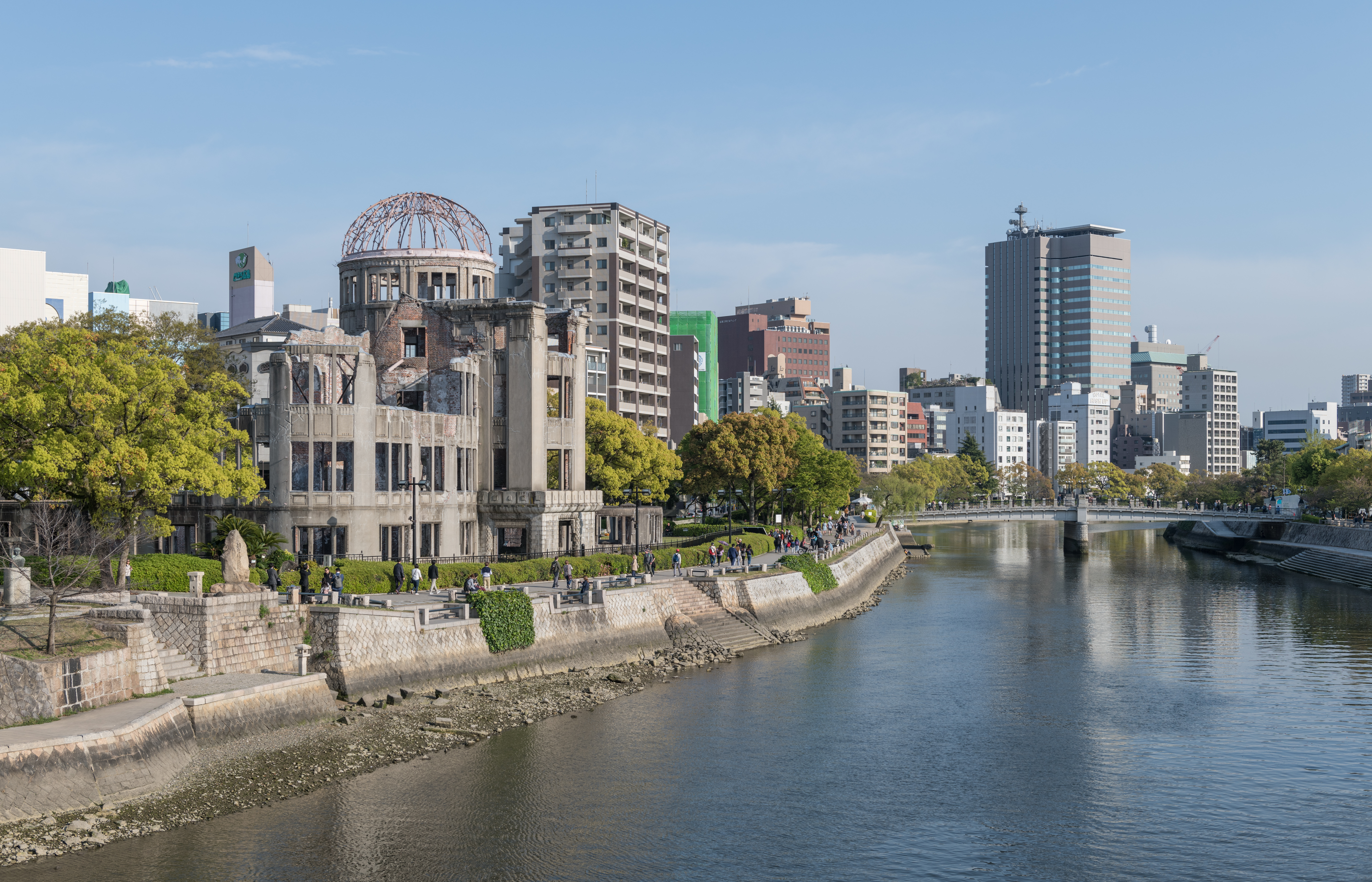
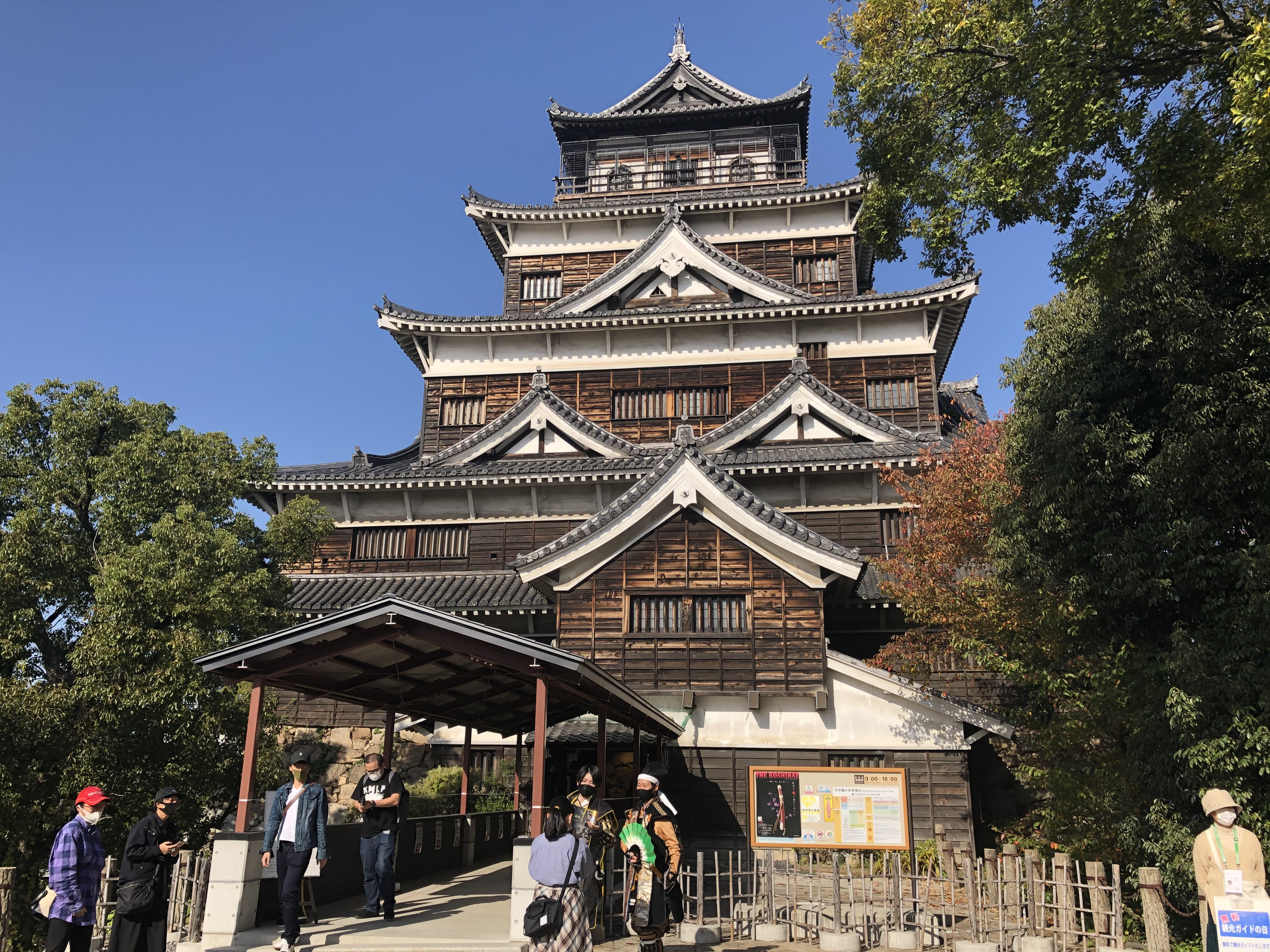
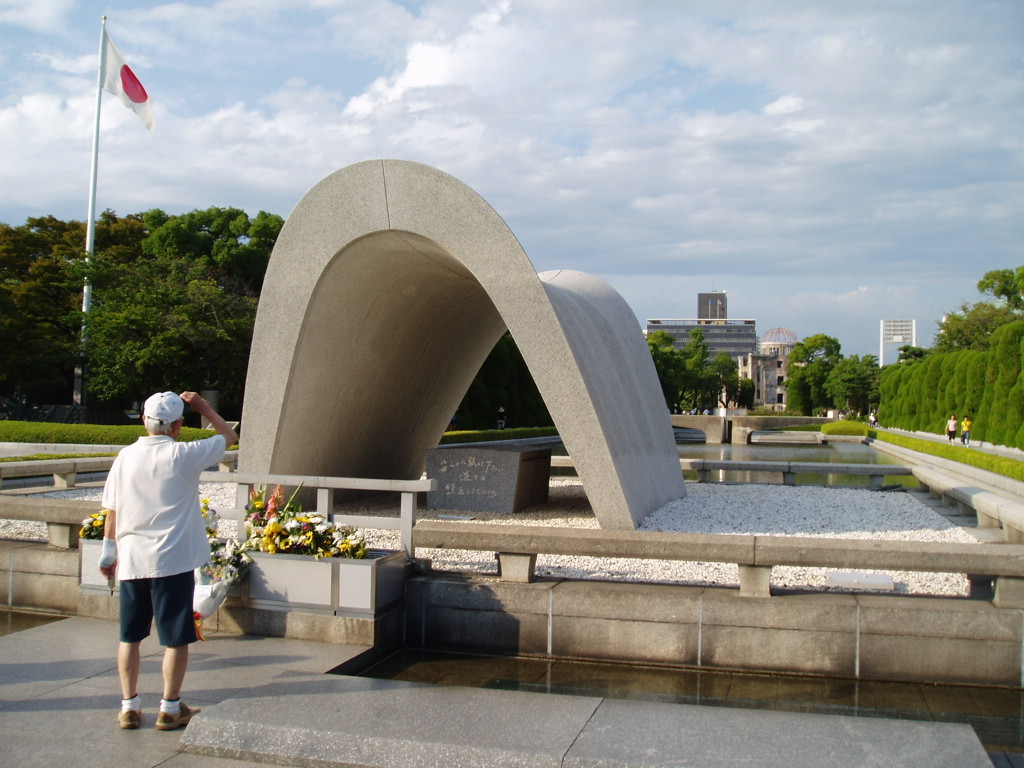
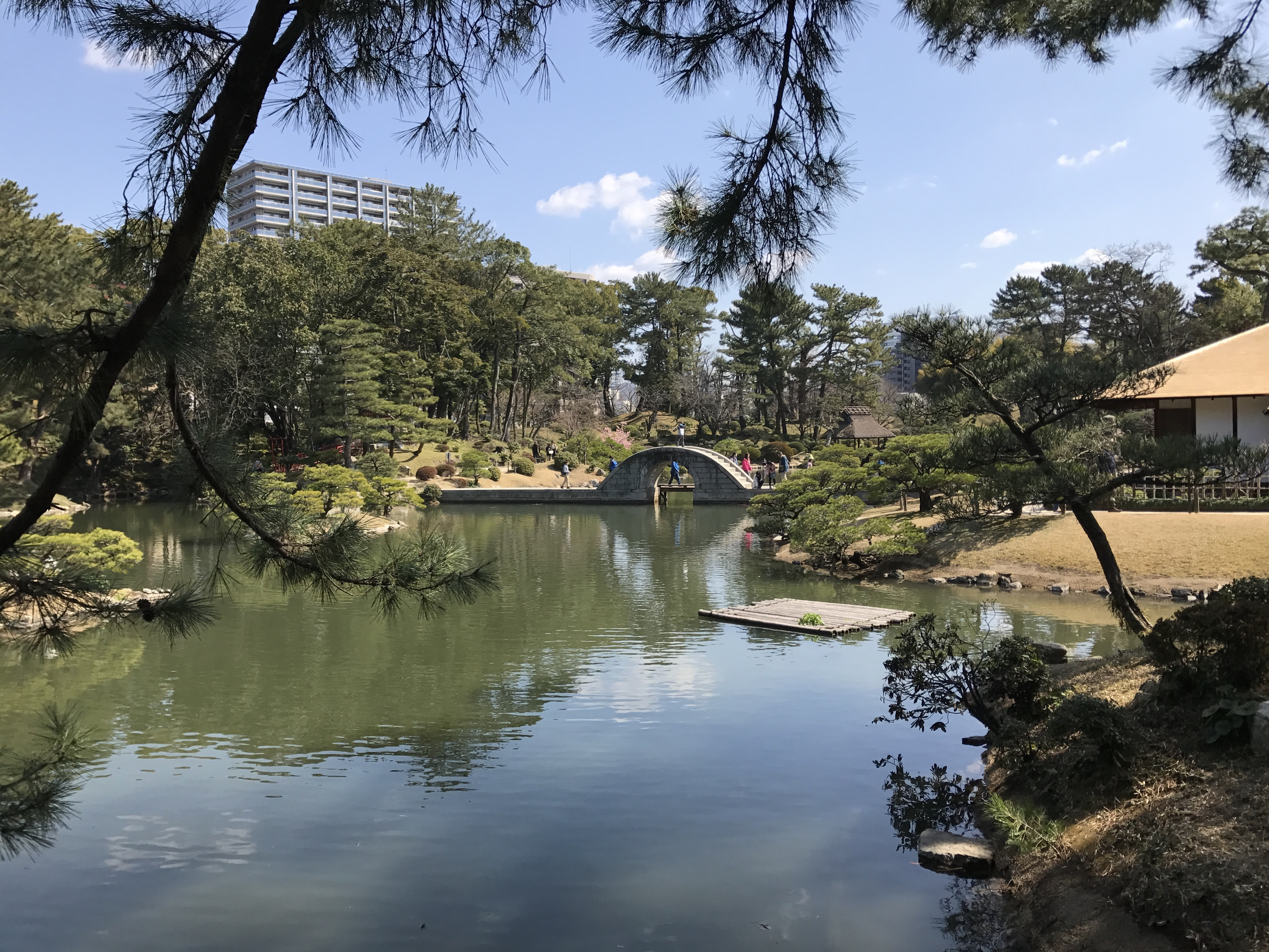
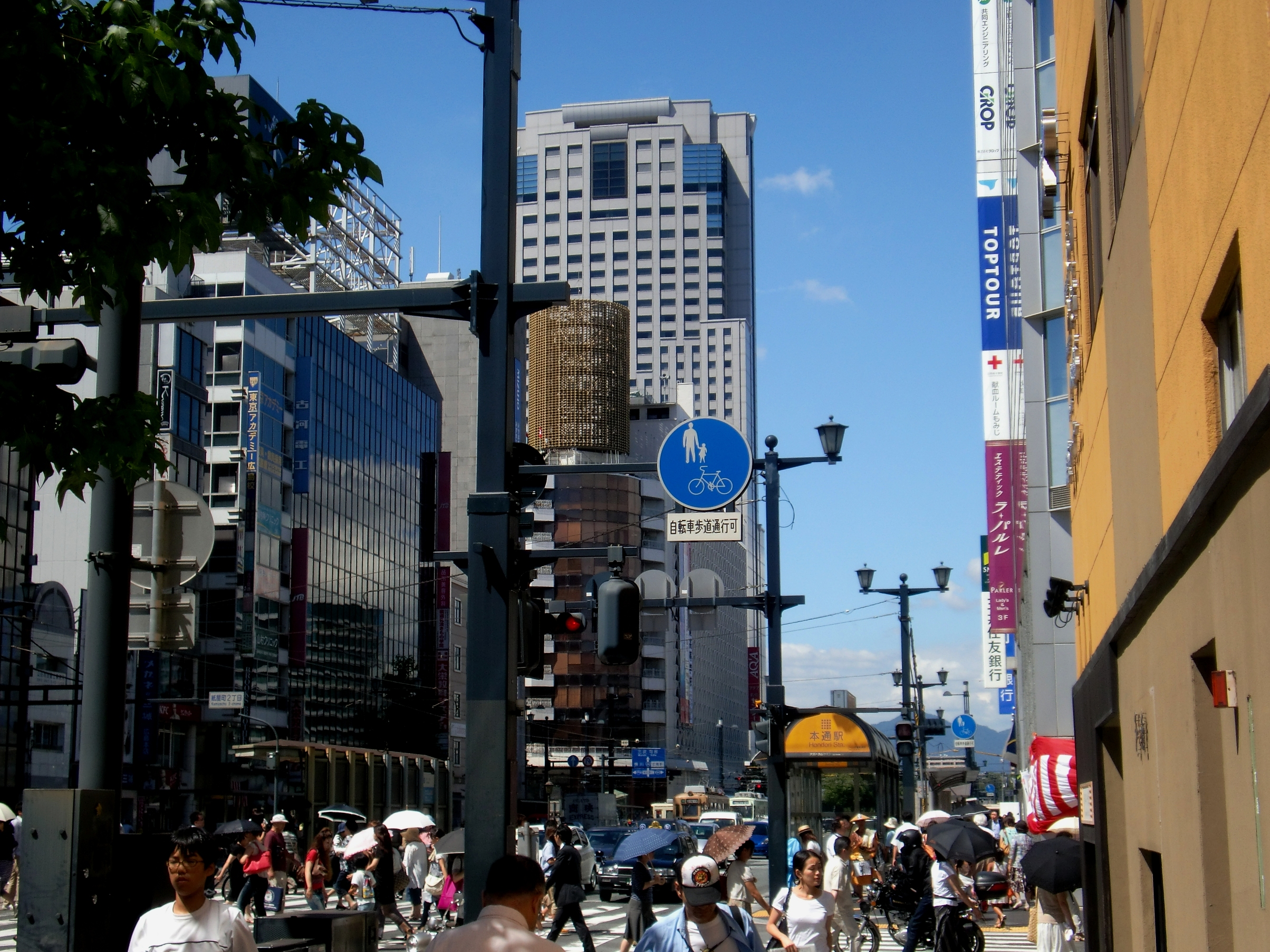
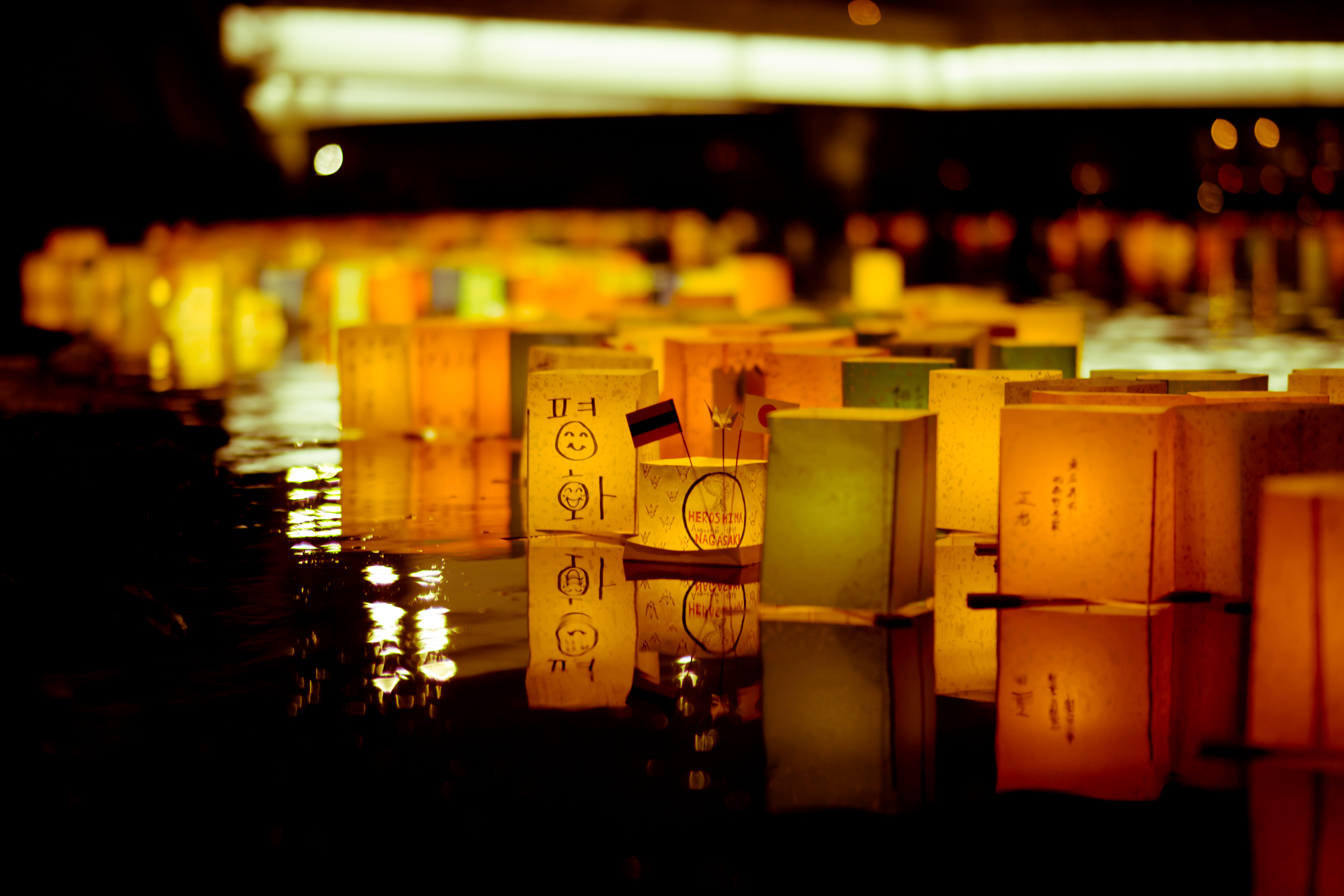
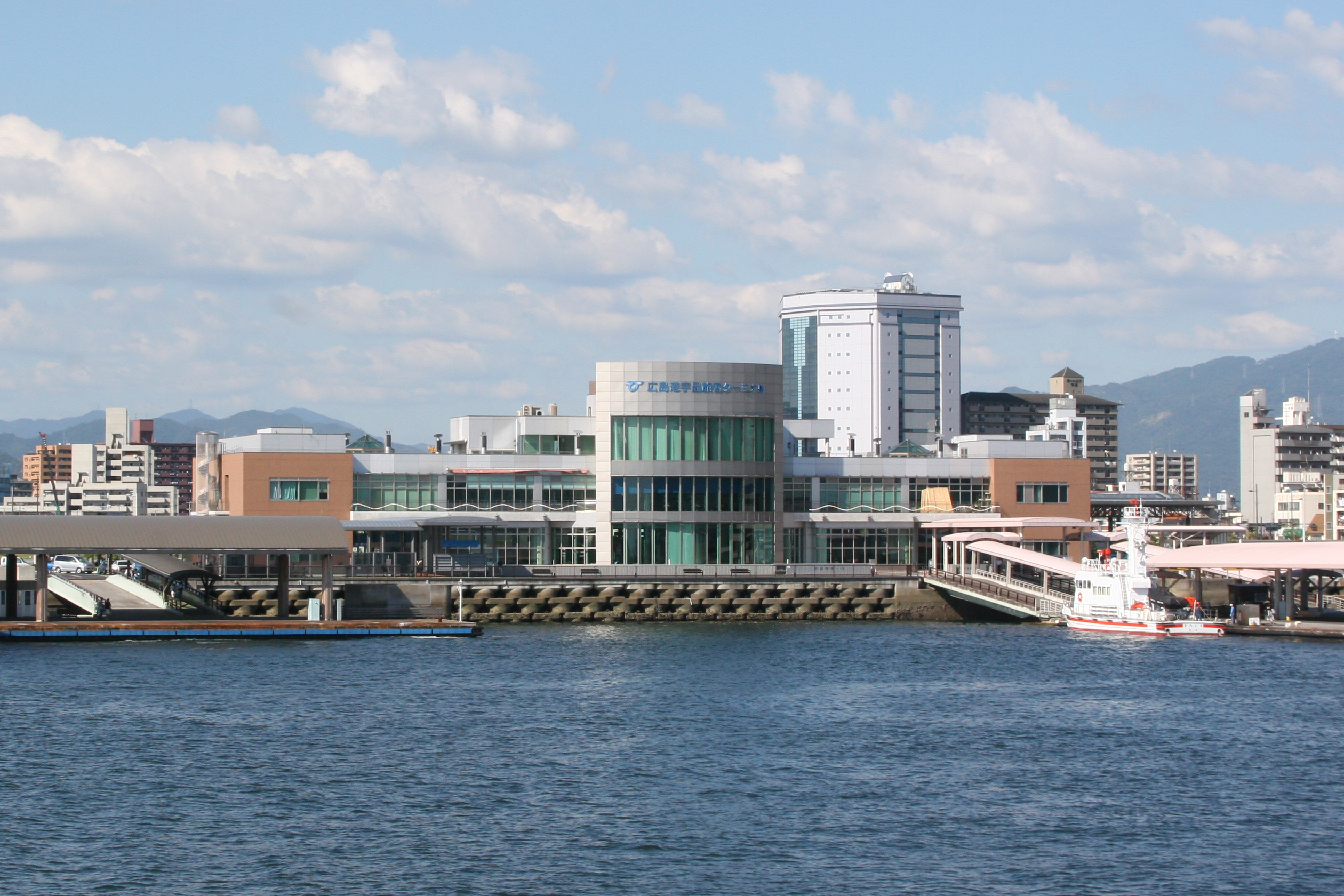
- Hiroshima skyline within A-Bomb Dome Hiroshima Castle Hiroshima Peace Memorial Museum and Park Shukkei-en Hondōri (Downtown) Peace Message (Water lantern) Port of Hiroshima

- Flag Seal

- Location of Hiroshima in Hiroshima Prefecture

- Hiroshima (Asia) Hiroshima (Earth)
- Coordinates: 34°23′29″N 132°27′07″E
- Country: Japan
- Region: Chūgoku (San'yō)
- Prefecture: Hiroshima Prefecture
- Founder: Mōri Terumoto

Government
  - Mayor: Kazumi Matsui

Area
  - Prefecture capital and Designated city: 906.68 km^{2} (350.07 sq mi)

Population (June 1, 2019)
  - Prefecture capital and Designated city: 1,199,391
  - Density: 1,322.8/km^{2} (3,426.1/sq mi)
  - Metro (2015): 1,431,634 (10th)
- Time zone: UTC+9 (Japan Standard Time)
- Tree: Camphor laurel
- Flower: Oleander
- Phone number: 082-245-2111
- Address: 1-6-34 Kokutaiji, Naka-ku, Hiroshima-shi 730-8586
- Website: www.city.hiroshima.lg.jp

Hiroshima
- "Hiroshima" in shinjitai kanji

Japanese name
- Kyūjitai: 廣島
- Shinjitai: 広島
Transcriptions
- Romanization: Hiroshima

Hiroshima Urban Employment Area

Hiroshima (広島市, Hiroshima-shi) (Note: English: /hɪ.ˈrɒʃ.ɪm.ə, hə-, -əm-, -ˈroʊʃ-, ˌhɪr.ə.ˈʃiːm-, -ɒ-, -oʊ-/ Japanese: [çì.ɾó̞.ɕí.mä́(.ɕì)]) is the capital of Hiroshima Prefecture in Japan. As of August 1, 2026, the city had an estimated population of 1,170,194. The gross domestic product (GDP) in Greater Hiroshima, Hiroshima Urban Employment Area, was US$61.3 billion as of 2010. Kazumi Matsui has been the city's mayor since April 2011. The Hiroshima metropolitan area is the second largest urban area in the Chugoku Region of Japan, following the Okayama metropolitan area.

Hiroshima was founded in 1589 as a castle town on the Ōta River delta. Following the Meiji Restoration in 1868, Hiroshima rapidly transformed into a major urban center and industrial hub. In 1889, Hiroshima officially gained city status. The city was a center of military activities during the imperial era, playing significant roles such as in the First Sino-Japanese War, the Russo-Japanese War, and the two world wars.

Hiroshima was the first military target of a nuclear weapon in history. This occurred on August 6, 1945, in the Pacific theatre of World War II, at 8:15 a.m., when the United States Army Air Forces dropped the atomic bomb "Little Boy" on the city. Most of Hiroshima was destroyed, and by the end of the year between 90,000 and 166,000 had died as a result of the blast and its effects. The Hiroshima Peace Memorial (a UNESCO World Heritage Site) serves as a memorial of the bombing.

Since being rebuilt after the war, Hiroshima has become the largest city in the Chūgoku region of western Honshu.

== History ==
=== Early history ===
The region where Hiroshima stands today was originally a small fishing village along the shores of Hiroshima Bay. From the 12th century, the village was rather prosperous and was economically attached to a Zen Buddhist temple called Mitaki-dera. This new prosperity was partly caused by the increase of trade with the rest of Japan under the auspices of the Taira clan.

=== Sengoku and Edo periods (1589–1871) ===
Hiroshima was established on the delta coastline of the Seto Inland Sea in 1589 by powerful warlord Mōri Terumoto. Hiroshima Castle was quickly built, and in 1593 Mōri moved in. The name Hiroshima means wide island in Japanese. Terumoto was on the losing side at the Battle of Sekigahara. The winner of the battle, Tokugawa Ieyasu, deprived Mōri Terumoto of most of his fiefs, including Hiroshima and gave Aki Province to Masanori Fukushima, a daimyō (Feudal Lord) who had supported Tokugawa. From 1619 until 1871, Hiroshima was ruled by the Asano clan.

Gallery

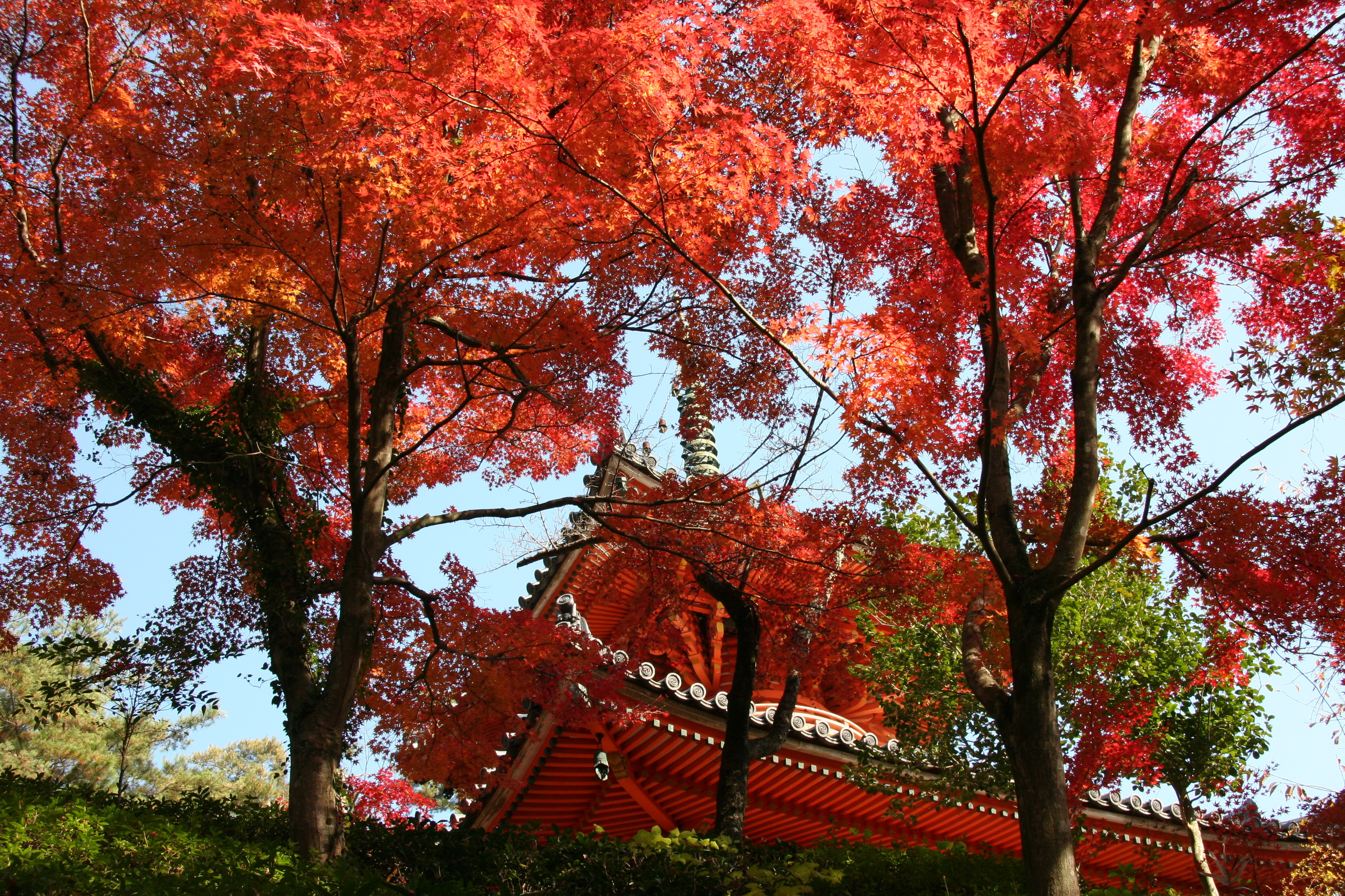
Mitaki-dera

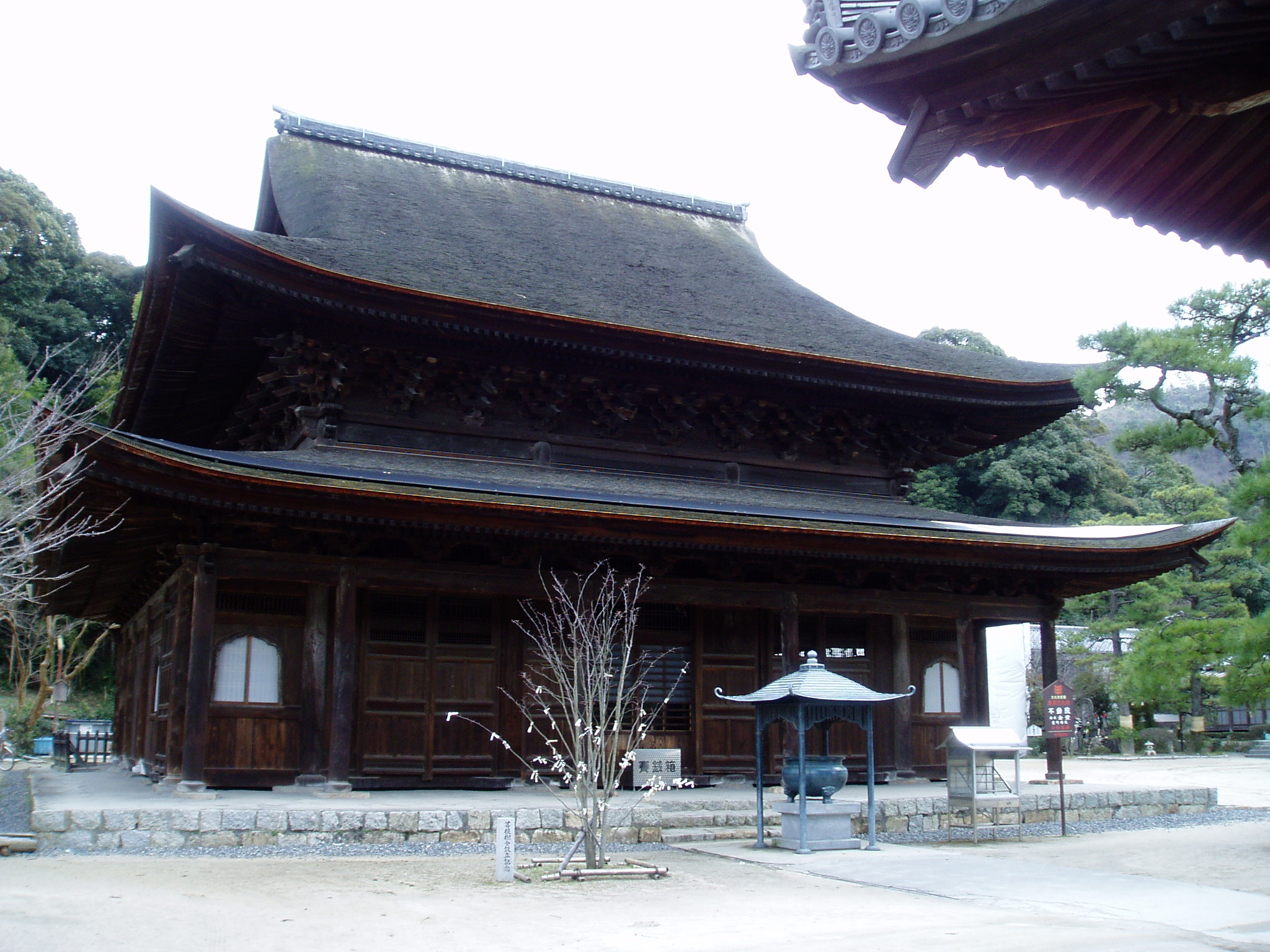
Fudoin

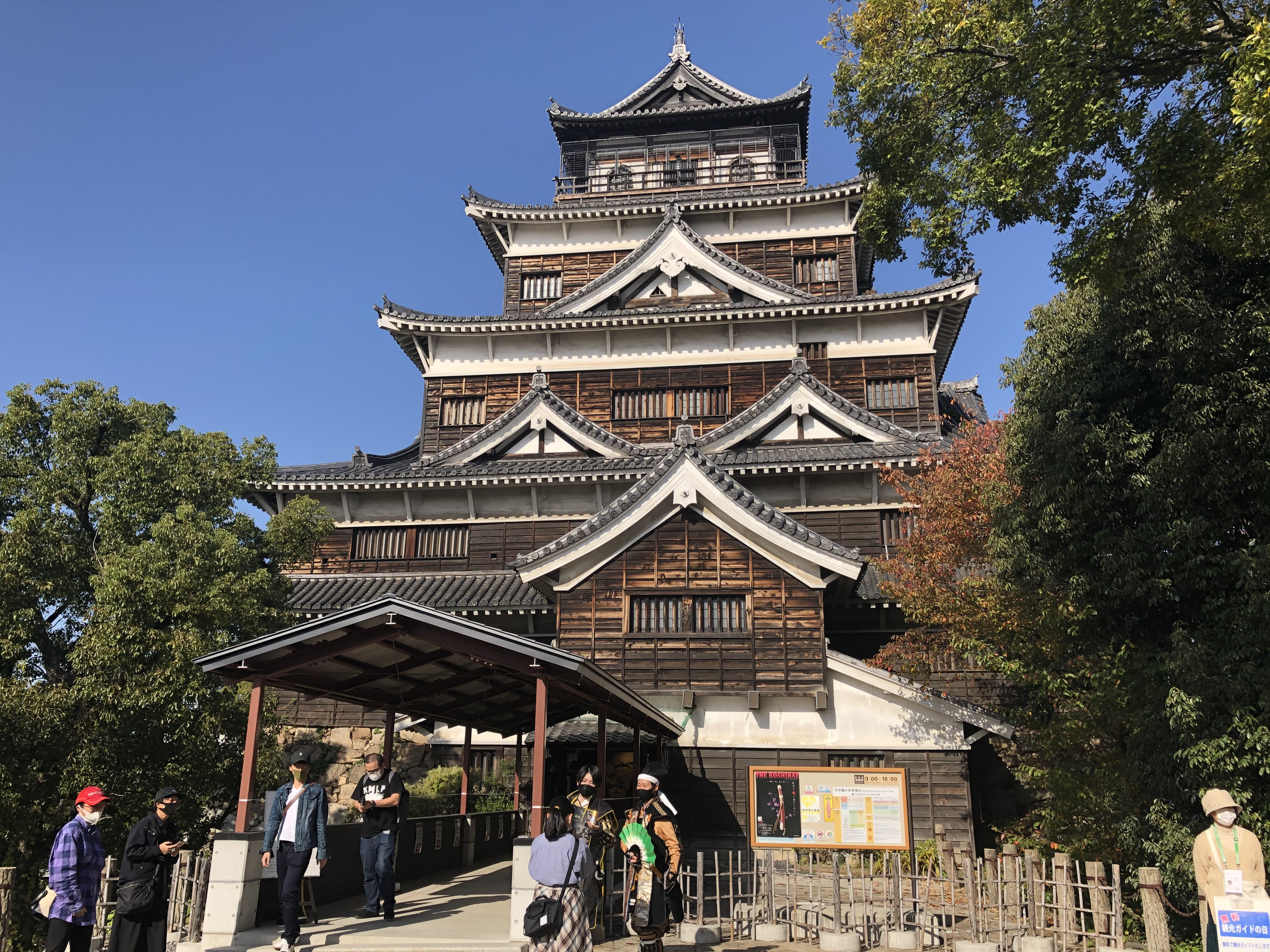
Hiroshima Castle

=== Meiji and Showa periods (1871–1939) ===
After the Han was abolished in 1871, the city became the capital of Hiroshima Prefecture. Hiroshima became a major urban center during the imperial period, as the Japanese economy shifted from primarily rural to urban industries. During the 1870s, one of the seven government-sponsored English language schools was established in Hiroshima. Ujina Harbor was constructed through the efforts of Hiroshima Governor Sadaaki Senda in the 1880s, allowing Hiroshima to become an important port city.

The San'yō Railway was extended to Hiroshima in 1894, and a rail line from the main station to the harbor was constructed for military transportation during the First Sino-Japanese War. During that war, the Japanese government moved temporarily to Hiroshima, and Emperor Meiji maintained his headquarters at Hiroshima Castle from September 15, 1894, to April 27, 1895. The significance of Hiroshima for the Japanese government can be discerned from the fact that the first round of talks between Chinese and Japanese representatives to end the Sino-Japanese War was held in Hiroshima, from February 1 to 4, 1895. New industrial plants, including cotton mills, were established in Hiroshima in the late 19th century. Further industrialization in Hiroshima was stimulated during the Russo-Japanese War in 1904, which required development and production of military supplies. The Hiroshima Prefectural Commercial Exhibition Hall was constructed in 1915 as a center for trade and the exhibition of new products. Later, its name was changed to Hiroshima Prefectural Product Exhibition Hall, and again to Hiroshima Prefectural Industrial Promotion Hall. The building, now known as the A-Bomb Dome, part of the Hiroshima Peace Memorial, a World Heritage Site since 1996, permanently remains the only structure still standing and is a state of preserved ruin.

During World War I, Hiroshima became a focal point of military activity, as the Japanese government joined the Allies at war. About 500 German POWs were held in Ninoshima Island in Hiroshima Bay. The growth of Hiroshima as a city continued after the First World War, as the city now attracted the attention of the Catholic Church, and on May 4, 1923, an Apostolic Vicar was appointed for that city.

Gallery

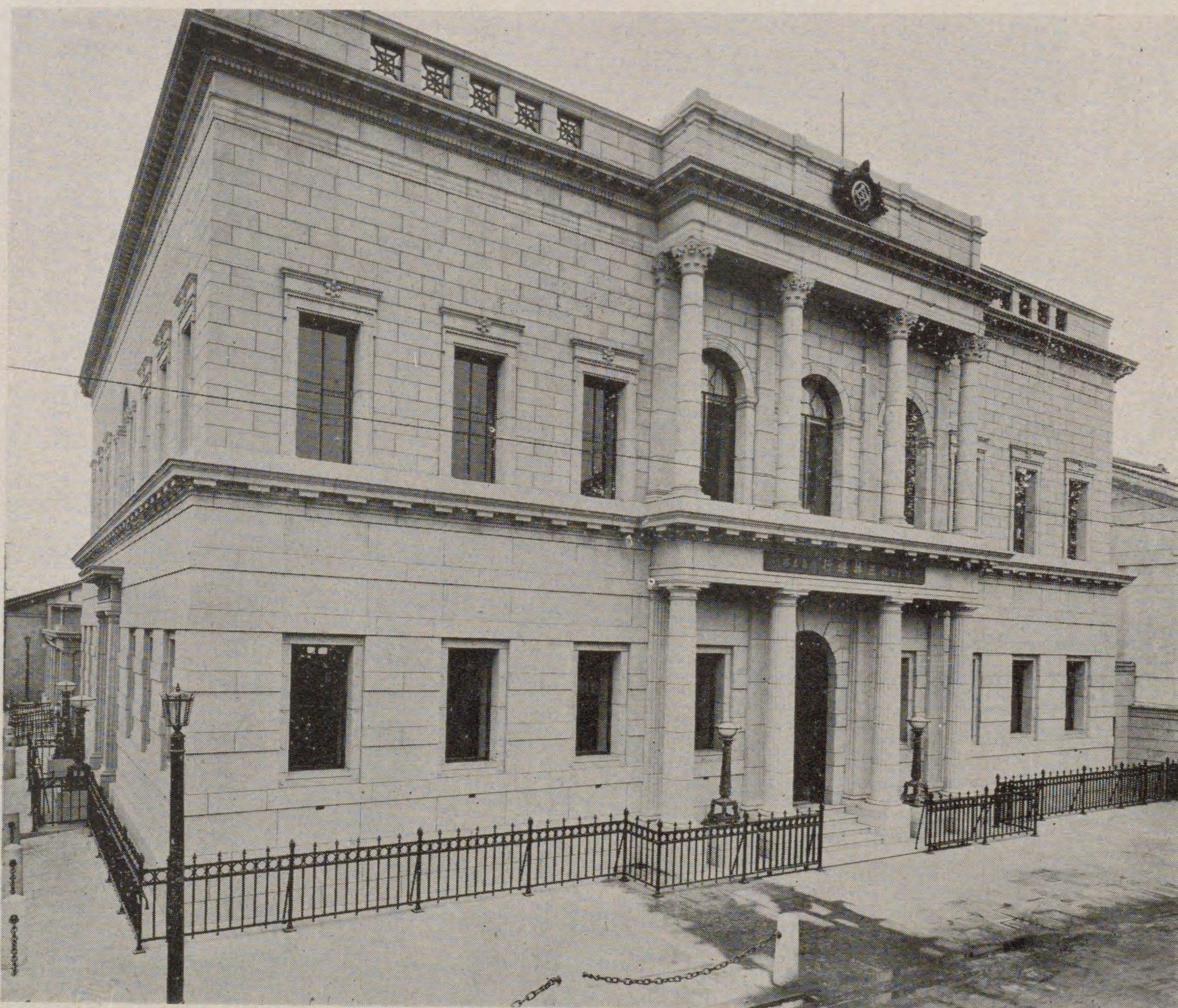
Old Mitsui Bank Hiroshima Branch (1928)

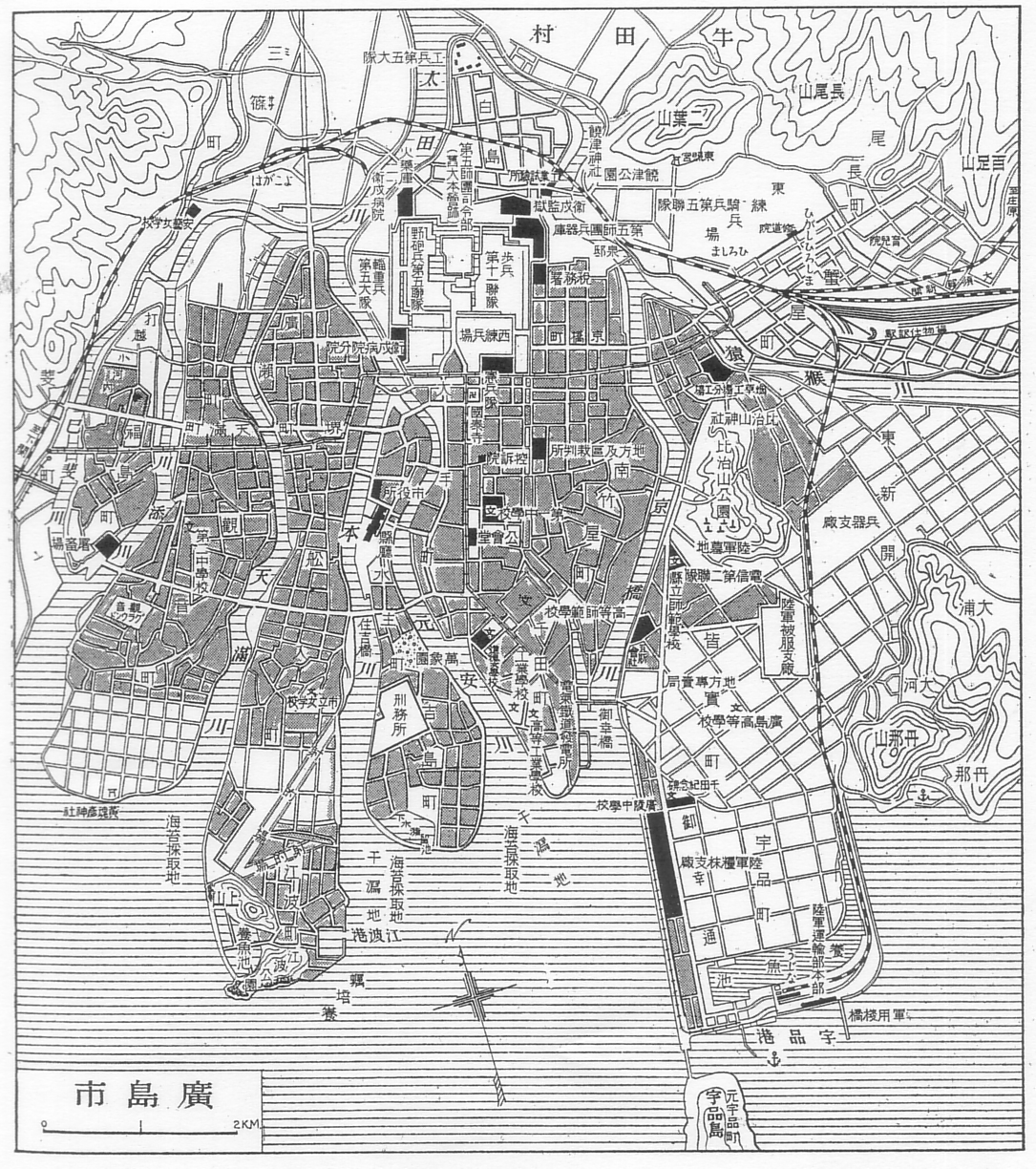
Map of Hiroshima City in the 1930s (Japanese edition)

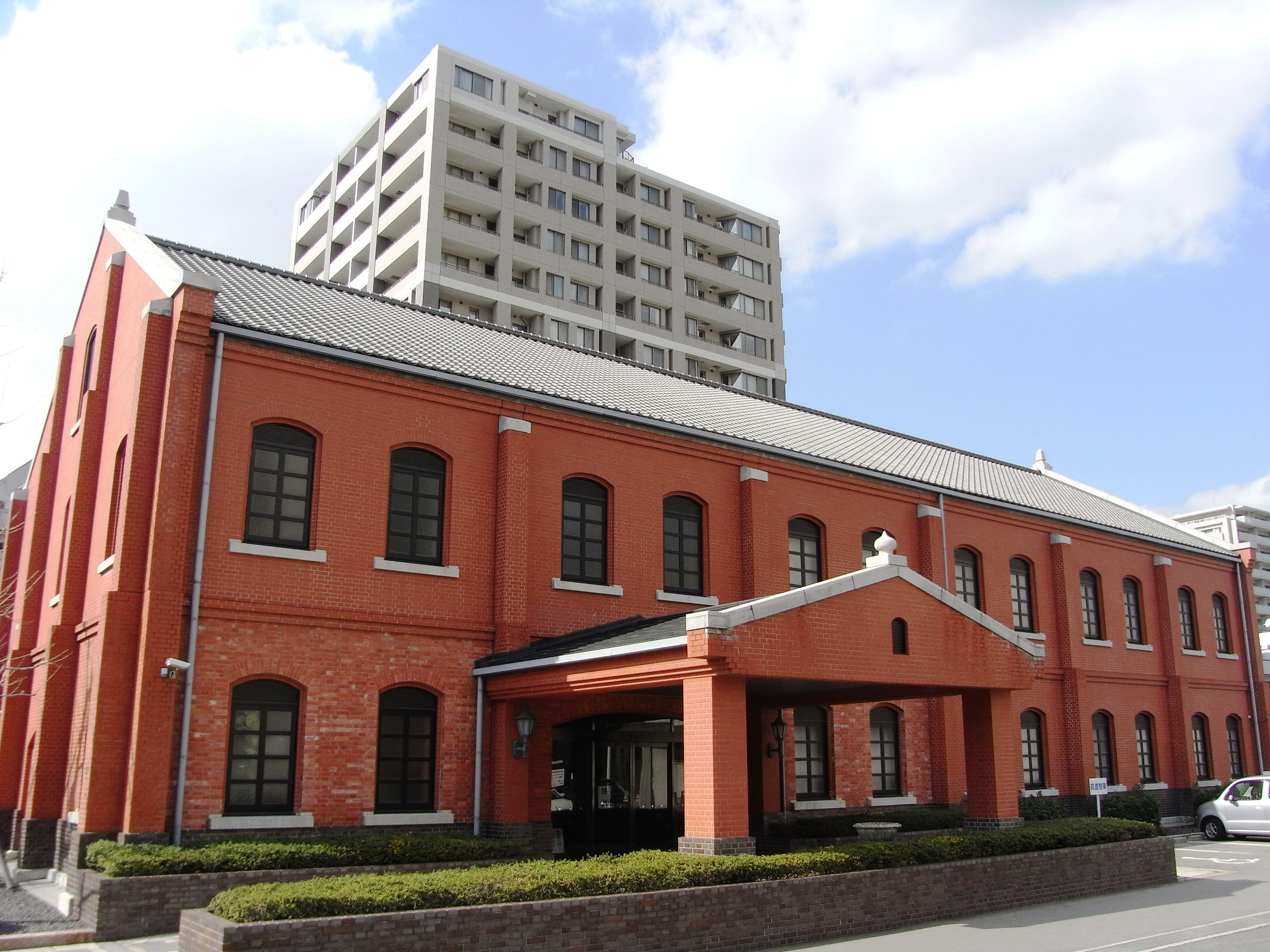
Old Hiroshima Army Weapon Depot

=== World War II and the atomic bombing (1939–1945) ===
During World War II, the Second General Army and Chūgoku Regional Army was headquartered in Hiroshima, and the Army Marine Headquarters was located at Ujina port. The city also had large depots of military supplies, and was a key center for shipping.

The bombing of Tokyo and other cities in Japan during World War II caused widespread destruction and hundreds of thousands of civilian deaths. There were no such air raids on Hiroshima. However, a real threat existed and was recognized. To protect against potential firebombings in Hiroshima, school children aged 11–14 years were mobilized to demolish houses and create firebreaks.

On Monday, August 6, 1945, at 8:15 a.m. (Hiroshima time), an American Boeing B-29 Superfortress, the Enola Gay, flown by Paul Tibbets (23 February 1915 – 1 November 2007), dropped the nuclear weapon "Little Boy" on Hiroshima, directly killing at least 70,000 people, including thousands of Korean slave laborers. Fewer than 10% of the casualties were military. By the end of the year, injury and radiation brought the total number of deaths to 90,000–140,000. The population before the bombing was around 345,000. About 70% of the city's buildings were destroyed, and another 7% severely damaged.

The public release of film footage of the city following the attack, and some of the Atomic Bomb Casualty Commission research on the human effects of the attack, were restricted during the occupation of Japan, and much of this information was censored until the signing of the Treaty of San Francisco in 1951, restoring control to the Japanese.

As Ian Buruma observed:

News of the amazing explosion of the atom bomb attacks on Japan was deliberately withheld from the Japanese public by US military censors during the Allied occupation—even as they sought to teach the natives the virtues of a free press. Casualty statistics were suppressed. Film shot by Japanese cameramen in Hiroshima and Nagasaki after the bombings was confiscated. "Hiroshima", the account written by John Hersey for The New Yorker, had a huge impact in the US, but was banned in Japan. As [John] Dower says: "In the localities themselves, suffering was compounded not merely by the unprecedented nature of the catastrophe ... but also by the fact that public struggle with this traumatic experience was not permitted."

The book Hiroshima by John Hersey was originally published in article form in the magazine The New Yorker, on August 31, 1946. It is reported to have reached Tokyo, in English, at least by January 1947 and the translated version was released in Japan in 1949. Although the article was planned to be published over four issues, "Hiroshima" made up the entire contents of one issue of the magazine. Hiroshima narrates the stories of six bomb survivors immediately before and four months after the dropping of the Little Boy bomb.

Oleander (Nerium) is the official flower of the city of Hiroshima because it was the first to bloom again after the explosion of the atomic bomb in 1945.

Gallery

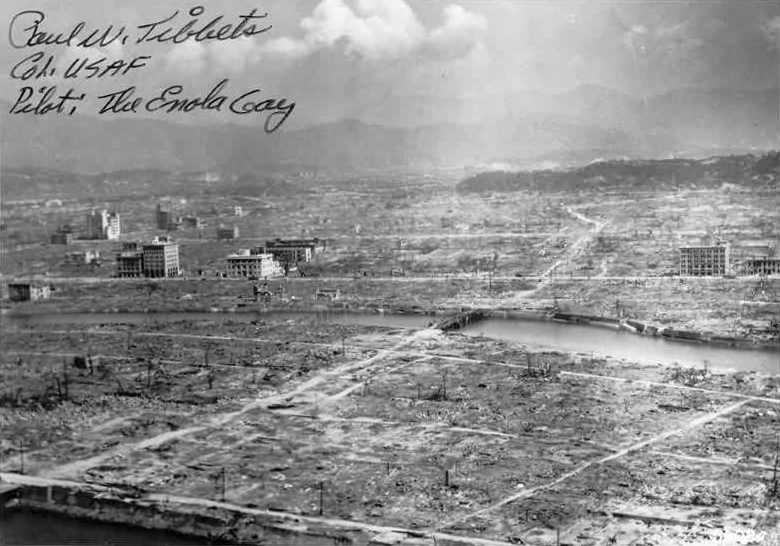
Hiroshima August 1945

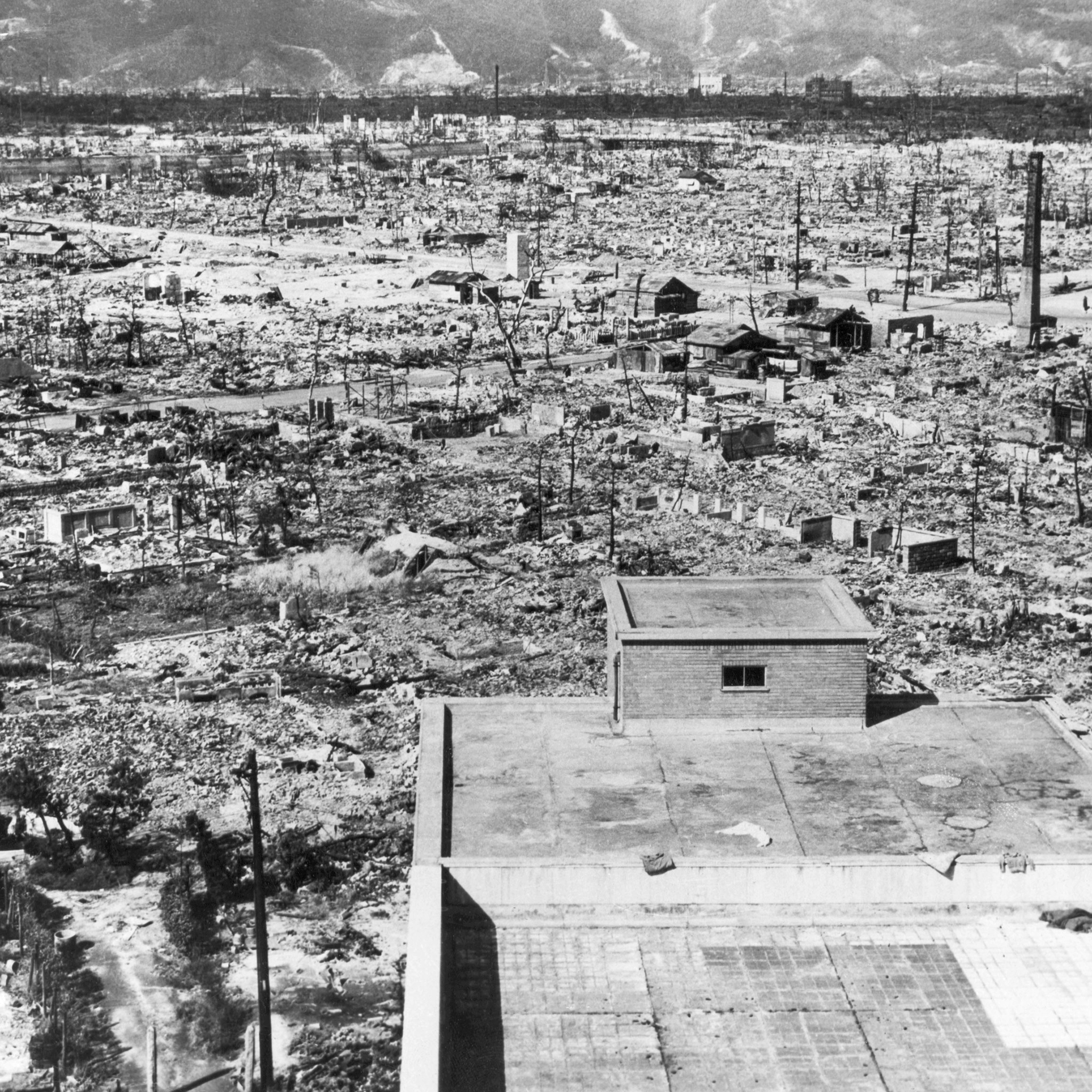
Hiroshima in October 1945, two months after the bombing

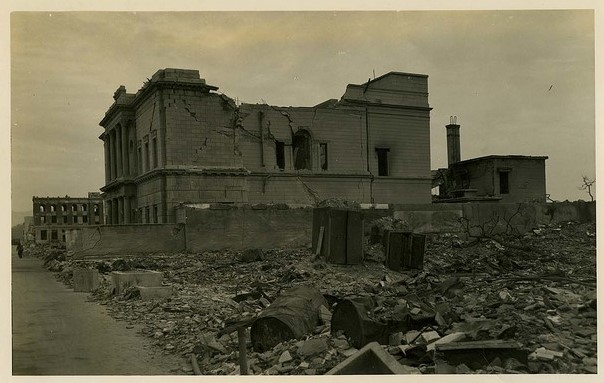
Old Teikoku Bank Hiroshima Branch (1945)

=== Postwar period (1945–present) ===
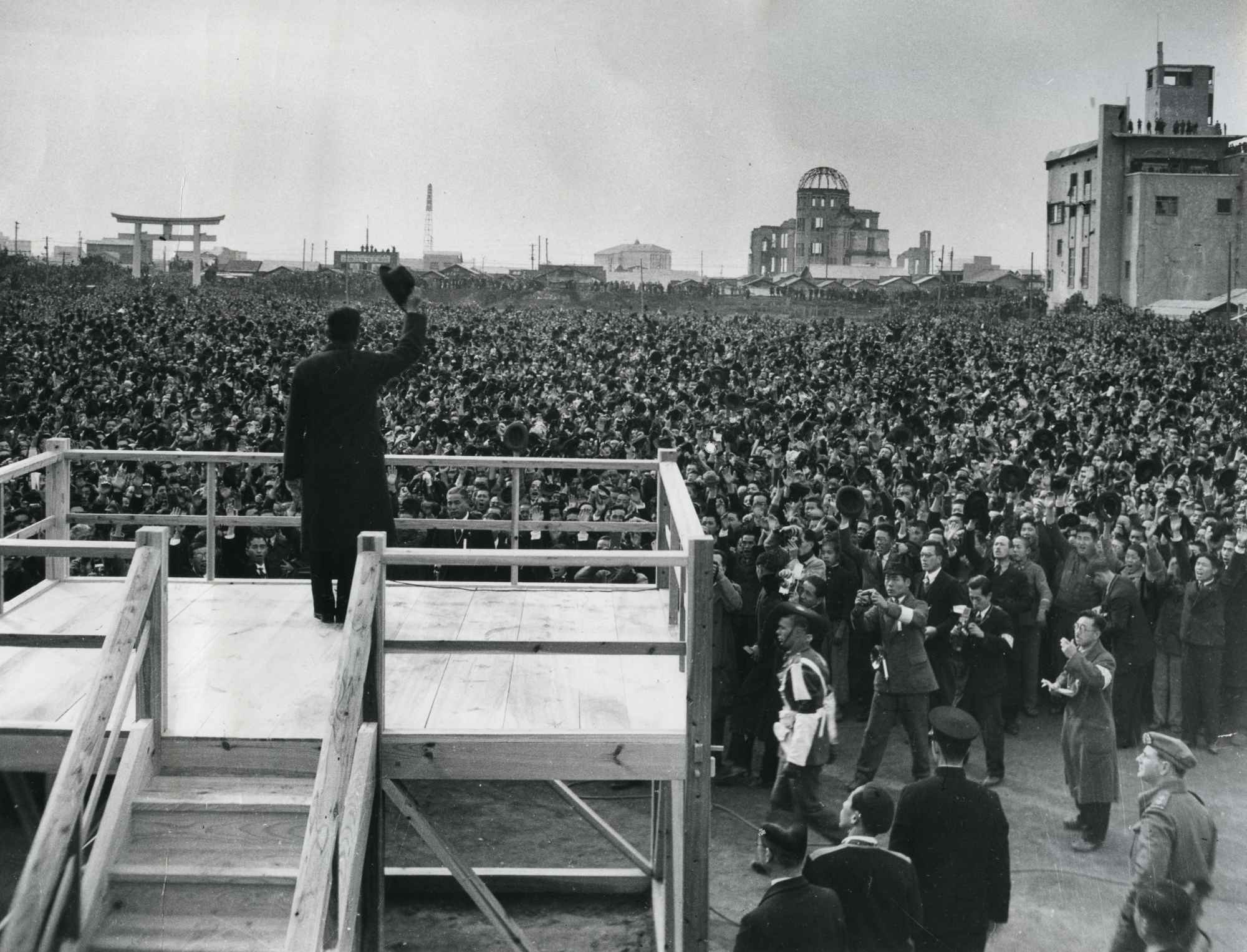
Emperor Hirohito visiting Hiroshima in 1947, where he held a speech encouraging the city's citizens in the aftermath of the war. The domed Hiroshima Peace Memorial can be seen in the background.

On September 17, 1945, Hiroshima was struck by the Makurazaki Typhoon (Typhoon Ida). Hiroshima Prefecture suffered more than 3,000 deaths and injuries, about half the national total. More than half the bridges in the city were destroyed, along with heavy damage to roads and railroads, further devastating the city.

From 1945 to 1952, Hiroshima came under occupation forces from the British Empire.

Hiroshima was rebuilt after the war, with help from the national government through the Hiroshima Peace Memorial City Construction Law passed in 1949. It provided financial assistance for reconstruction, along with land donated that was previously owned by the national government and used by the Imperial military.

In 1949, a design was selected for the Hiroshima Peace Memorial Park. Hiroshima Prefectural Industrial Promotion Hall, the closest surviving building to the location of the bomb's detonation, was designated the Genbaku Dome (原爆ドーム) or "Atomic Dome", a part of the Hiroshima Peace Memorial Park. The Hiroshima Peace Memorial Museum was opened in 1955 in the Peace Park. The historic castle of Hiroshima was rebuilt in 1958.

Hiroshima also contains a Peace Pagoda, built in 1966 by Nipponzan-Myōhōji. Uniquely, the pagoda is made of steel, rather than the usual stone.

Hiroshima was proclaimed a City of Peace by the Japanese parliament in 1949, at the initiative of its mayor, Shinzo Hamai (1905–1968). As a result, the city of Hiroshima received more international attention as a desirable location for holding international conferences on peace as well as social issues. As part of that effort, the Hiroshima Interpreters' and Guide's Association (HIGA) was established in 1992 to facilitate interpretation for conferences, and the Hiroshima Peace Institute was established in 1998 within the Hiroshima University. The city government continues to advocate the abolition of all nuclear weapons and the Mayor of Hiroshima is the president of Mayors for Peace, an international Mayoral organization mobilizing cities and citizens worldwide to abolish and eliminate nuclear weapons by 2020.

On May 27, 2016, Barack Obama became the first sitting United States president to visit Hiroshima. The 49th annual G7 summit was held in Hiroshima in May 2023.

Gallery

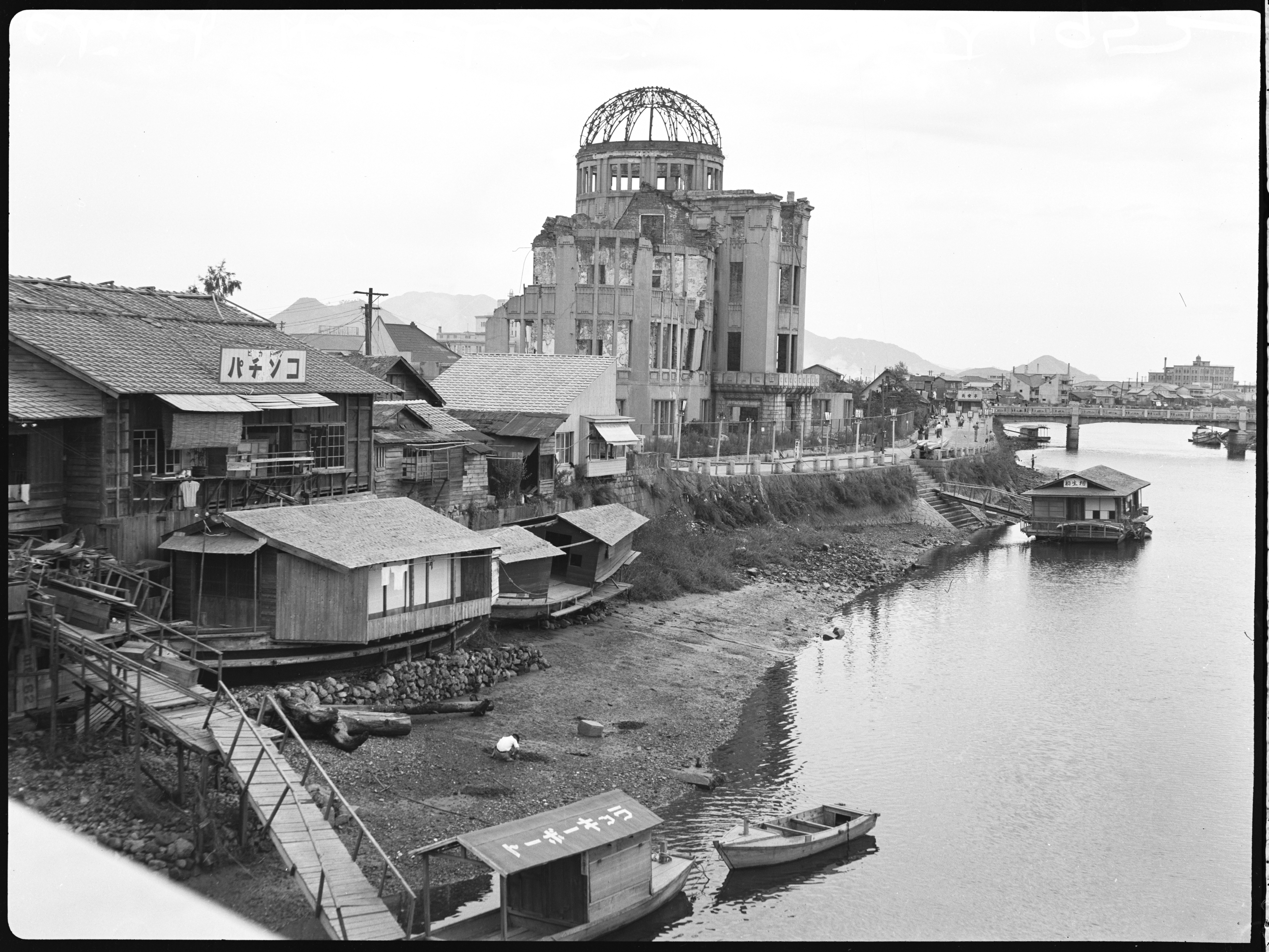
Hiroshima Peace Memorial (Genbaku Dome), Hiroshima, Japan, October 1952

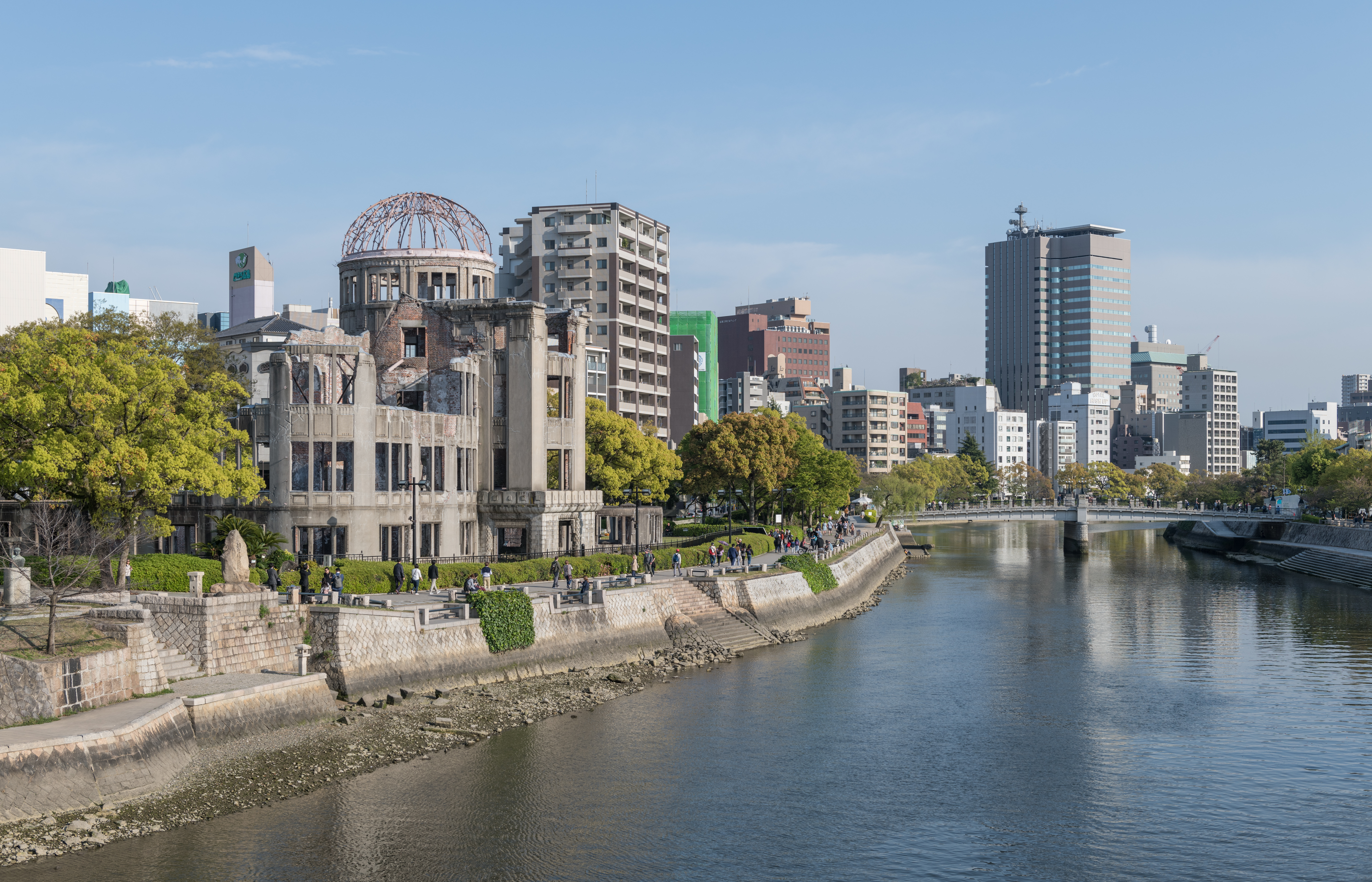
Atomic Bomb Dome by Jan Letzel and modern Hiroshima

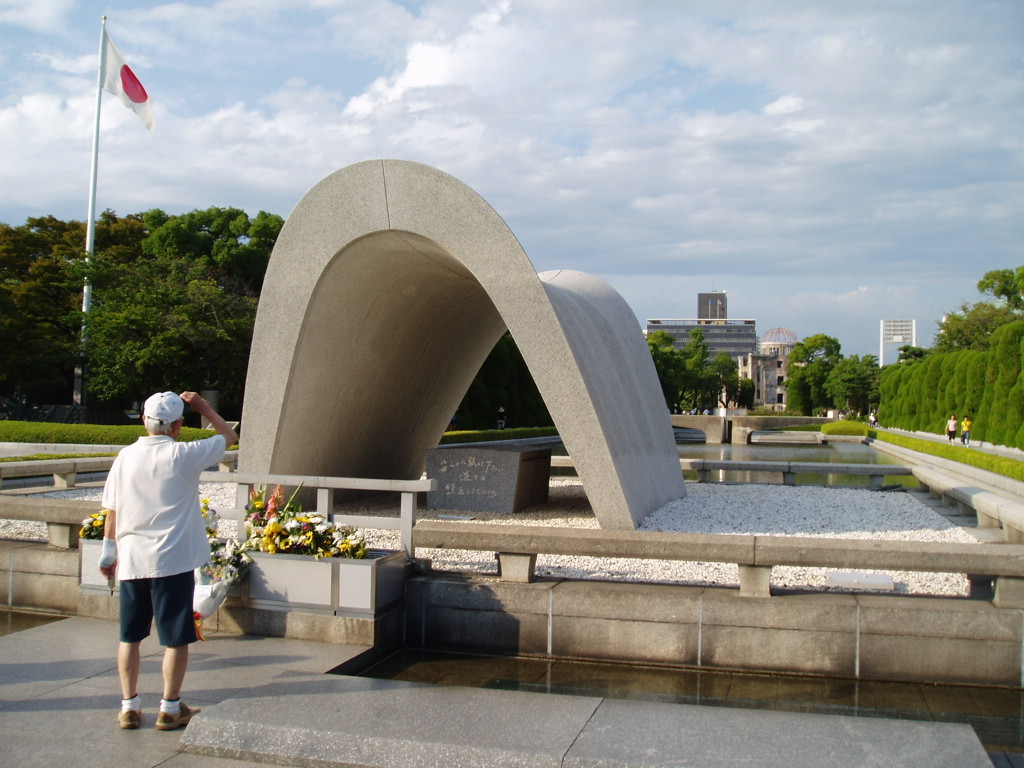
Hiroshima Peace Memorial Park

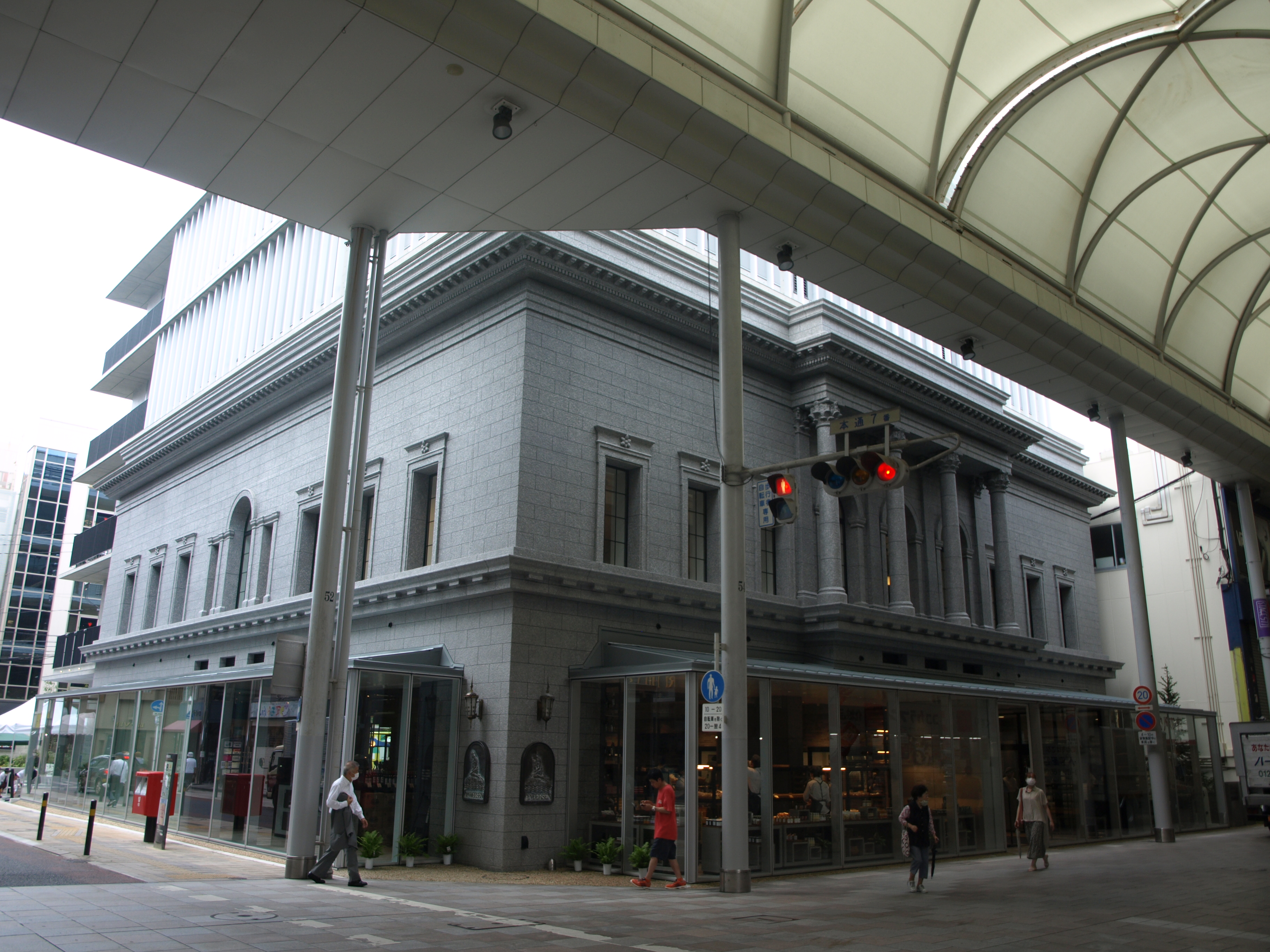
Andersen Takaki Bakery

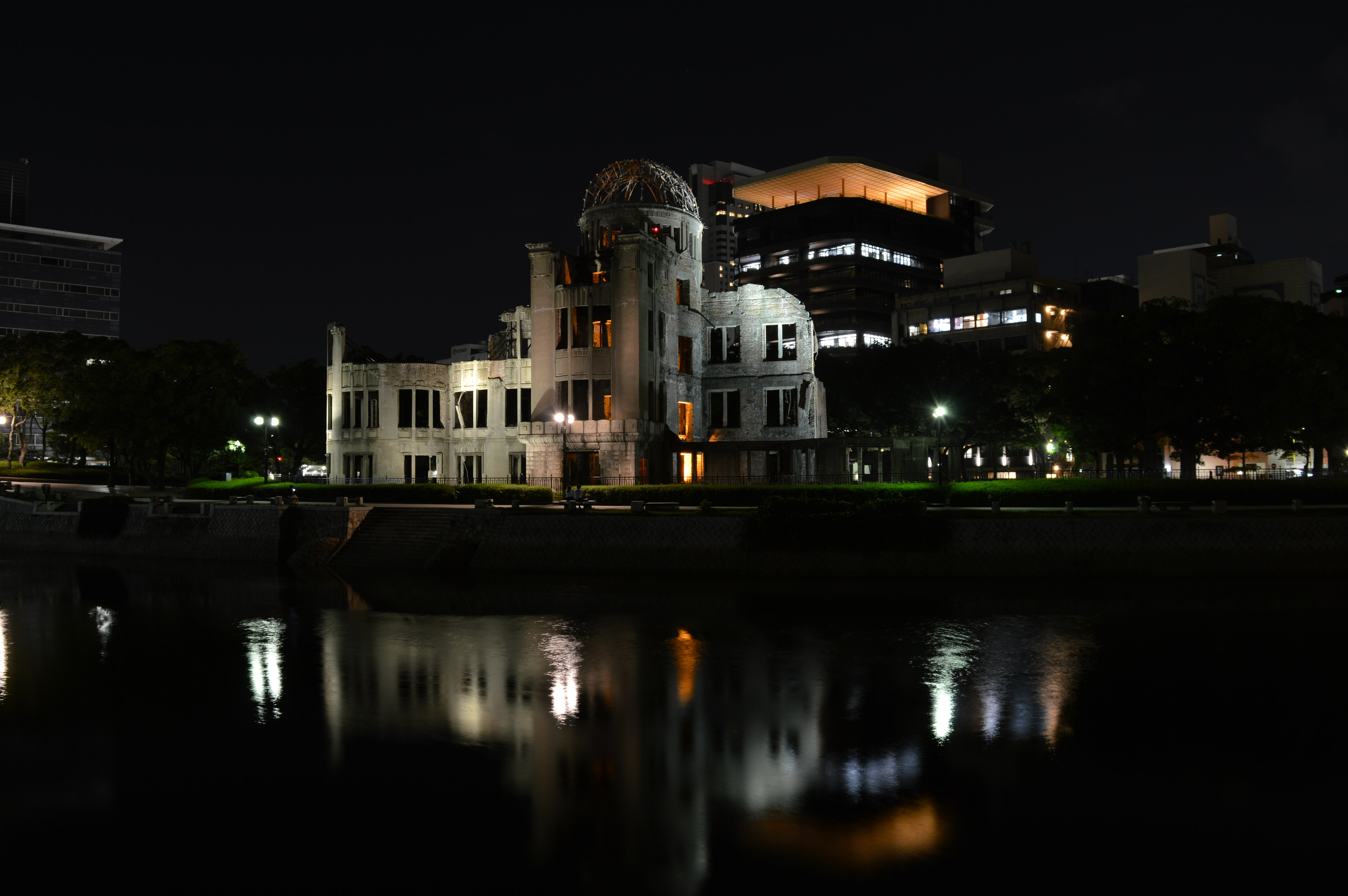
Atomic Bomb Dome by night

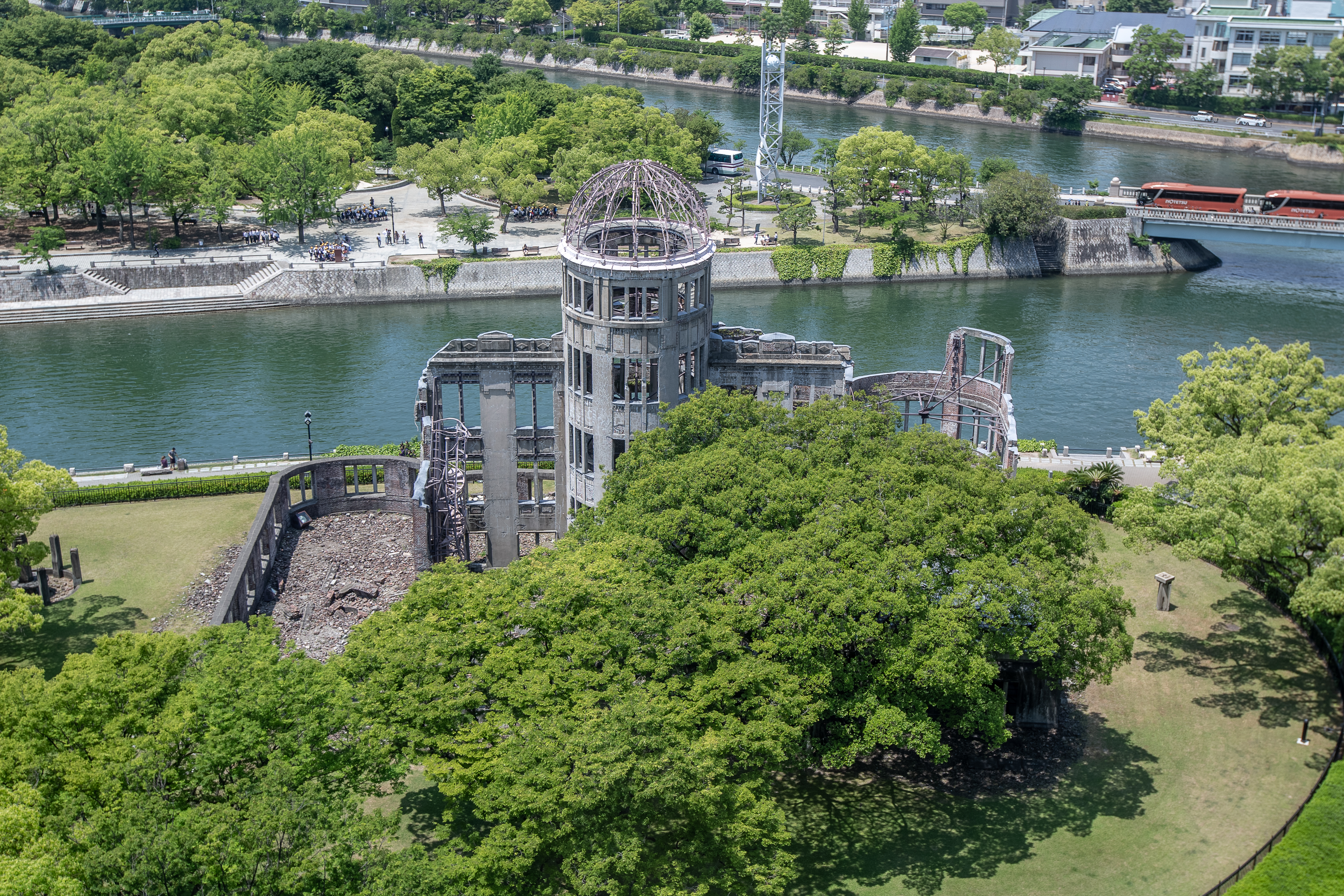
Genbaku Dome seen from Orizuru tower in 2019

== Geography ==
=== Climate ===
Hiroshima has a humid subtropical climate characterized by cool to mild winters and hot, humid summers. Like much of Japan, Hiroshima experiences a seasonal temperature lag in summer, with August rather than July being the warmest month of the year. Precipitation occurs year-round, although winter is the driest season. Rainfall peaks in June and July, with August experiencing sunnier and drier conditions.

Climate data for Hiroshima (1991–2020 normals, extremes 1879–present)
Month	Jan	Feb	Mar	Apr	May	Jun	Jul	Aug	Sep	Oct	Nov	Dec	Year
Record high °C (°F)	18.8 (65.8)	21.5 (70.7)	24.2 (75.6)	29.0 (84.2)	31.5 (88.7)	34.4 (93.9)	38.7 (101.7)	38.7 (101.7)	37.4 (99.3)	32.6 (90.7)	26.3 (79.3)	22.3 (72.1)	38.7 (101.7)
Mean maximum °C (°F)	14.7 (58.5)	17.0 (62.6)	20.8 (69.4)	25.7 (78.3)	29.3 (84.7)	31.7 (89.1)	35.2 (95.4)	36.1 (97.0)	33.7 (92.7)	28.3 (82.9)	22.9 (73.2)	17.4 (63.3)	36.4 (97.5)
Mean daily maximum °C (°F)	9.9 (49.8)	10.9 (51.6)	14.5 (58.1)	19.8 (67.6)	24.4 (75.9)	27.2 (81.0)	30.9 (87.6)	32.8 (91.0)	29.1 (84.4)	23.7 (74.7)	17.7 (63.9)	12.1 (53.8)	21.1 (70.0)
Daily mean °C (°F)	5.4 (41.7)	6.2 (43.2)	9.5 (49.1)	14.8 (58.6)	19.6 (67.3)	23.2 (73.8)	27.2 (81.0)	28.5 (83.3)	24.7 (76.5)	18.8 (65.8)	12.9 (55.2)	7.5 (45.5)	16.5 (61.7)
Mean daily minimum °C (°F)	1.6 (34.9)	2.2 (36.0)	5.1 (41.2)	10.1 (50.2)	15.1 (59.2)	19.8 (67.6)	24.1 (75.4)	25.1 (77.2)	21.1 (70.0)	14.9 (58.8)	8.9 (48.0)	3.9 (39.0)	12.7 (54.9)
Mean minimum °C (°F)	−1.9 (28.6)	−1.7 (28.9)	0.0 (32.0)	3.4 (38.1)	9.7 (49.5)	15.2 (59.4)	20.4 (68.7)	21.4 (70.5)	15.9 (60.6)	8.9 (48.0)	3.3 (37.9)	−0.2 (31.6)	−2.6 (27.3)
Record low °C (°F)	−8.5 (16.7)	−8.3 (17.1)	−7.2 (19.0)	−1.4 (29.5)	1.8 (35.2)	6.6 (43.9)	14.1 (57.4)	13.7 (56.7)	8.6 (47.5)	1.5 (34.7)	−2.6 (27.3)	−8.6 (16.5)	−8.6 (16.5)
Average precipitation mm (inches)	46.2 (1.82)	64.0 (2.52)	118.3 (4.66)	141.0 (5.55)	169.8 (6.69)	226.5 (8.92)	279.8 (11.02)	131.4 (5.17)	162.7 (6.41)	109.2 (4.30)	69.3 (2.73)	54.0 (2.13)	1,572.2 (61.90)
Average snowfall cm (inches)	3 (1.2)	3 (1.2)	0 (0)	0 (0)	0 (0)	0 (0)	0 (0)	0 (0)	0 (0)	0 (0)	0 (0)	2 (0.8)	8 (3.1)
Average precipitation days (≥ 0.5 mm)	6.8	8.3	10.6	9.9	9.7	11.9	11.6	8.6	9.6	7.1	6.9	7.6	108.6
Average relative humidity (%)	66	65	62	61	63	71	73	69	68	66	67	68	67
Mean monthly sunshine hours	138.6	140.1	176.7	191.9	210.8	154.6	173.4	207.3	167.3	178.6	153.3	140.6	2,033.1
Source: Japan Meteorological Agency

=== Wards ===
Hiroshima has eight wards (ku):

Ward	Japanese	Population	Area (km^{2})	Density (per km^{2})	Map
Aki-ku (Aki ward)	安芸区	80,702	94.08	857	
Asakita-ku (Asa-North ward)	安佐北区	148,426	353.33	420	
Asaminami-ku (Asa-south ward)	安佐南区	241,007	117.24	2,055	
Higashi-ku (East ward)	東区	121,012	39.42	3,069	
Minami-ku (South ward)	南区	141,219	26.30	5,369	
Naka-ku (Central ward) *administrative center	中区	130,879	15.32	8,543	
Nishi-ku (West ward)	西区	189,794	35.61	5,329	
Saeki-ku (Saeki ward)	佐伯区	137,838	225.22	612	
Population as of March 31, 2016

=== Cityscape ===
Gallery

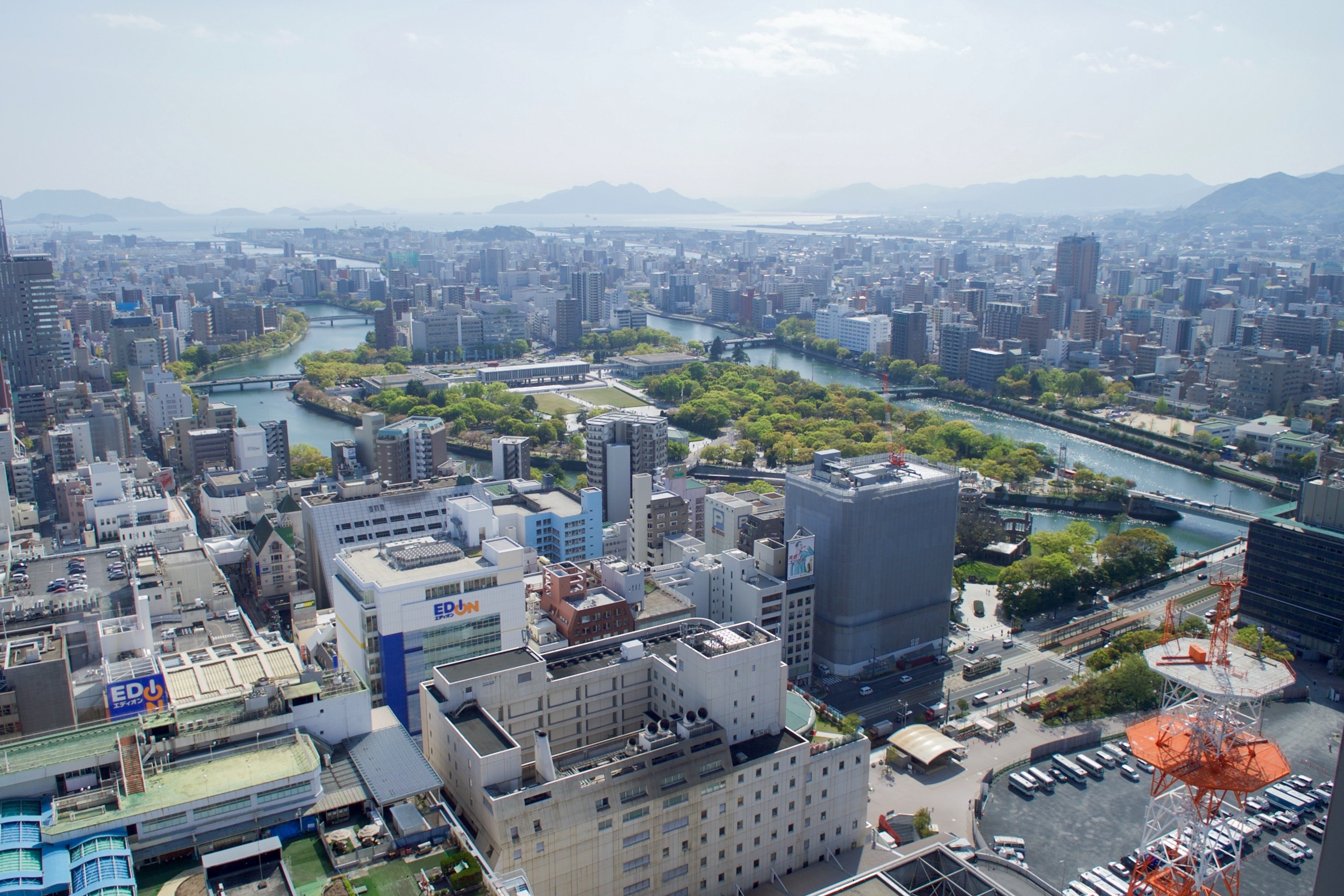
Hiroshima City CBD (2016)

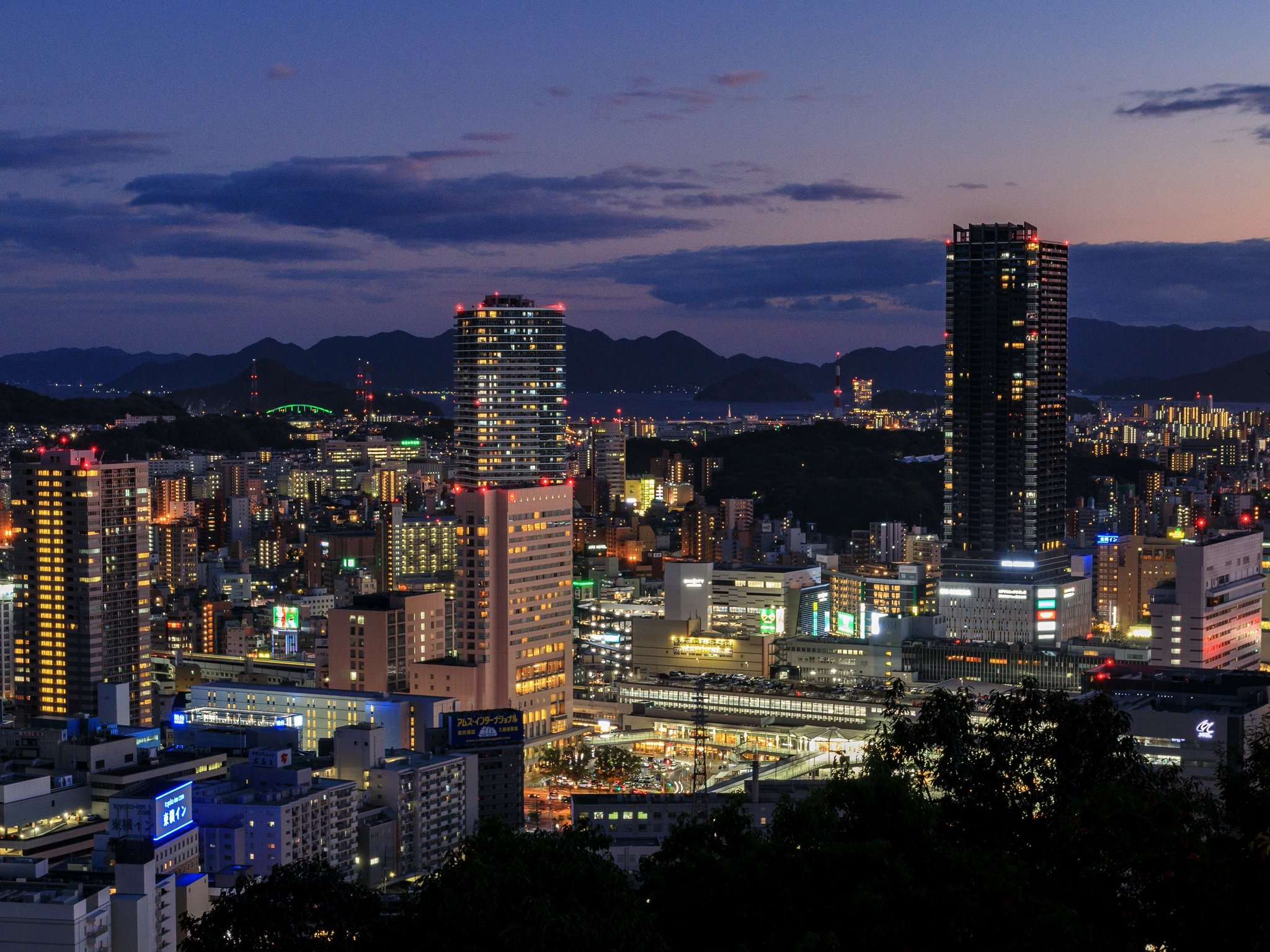
Skyline of Hiroshima City from Mount Futaba (2019)

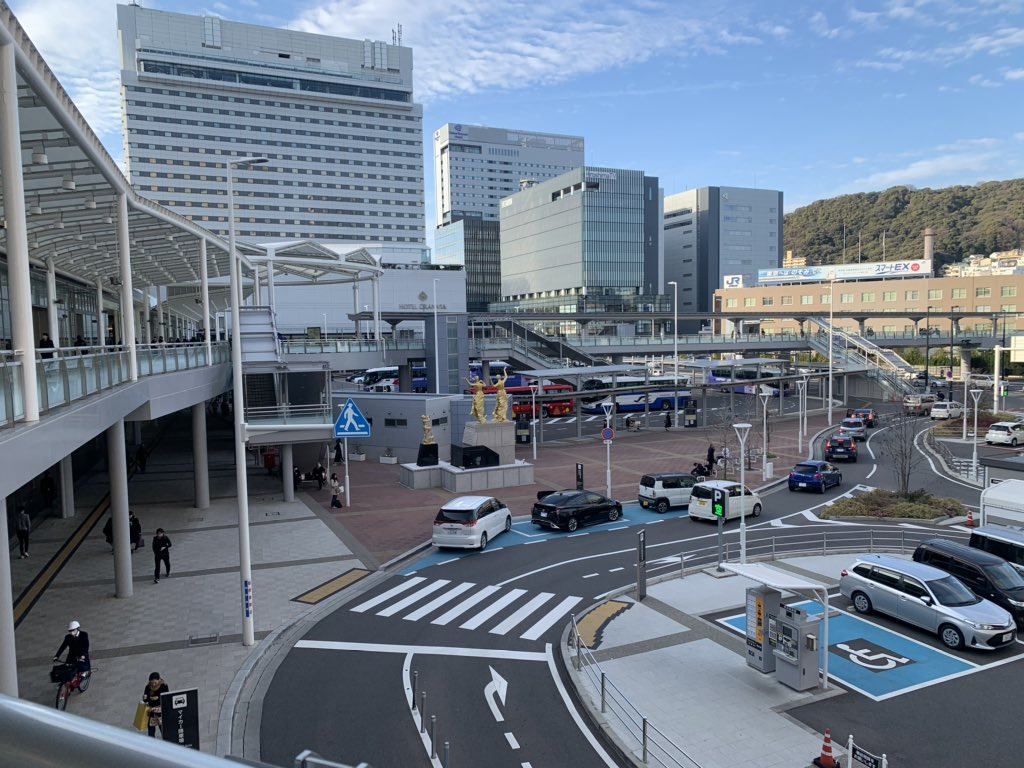
Hiroshima Station (2021)

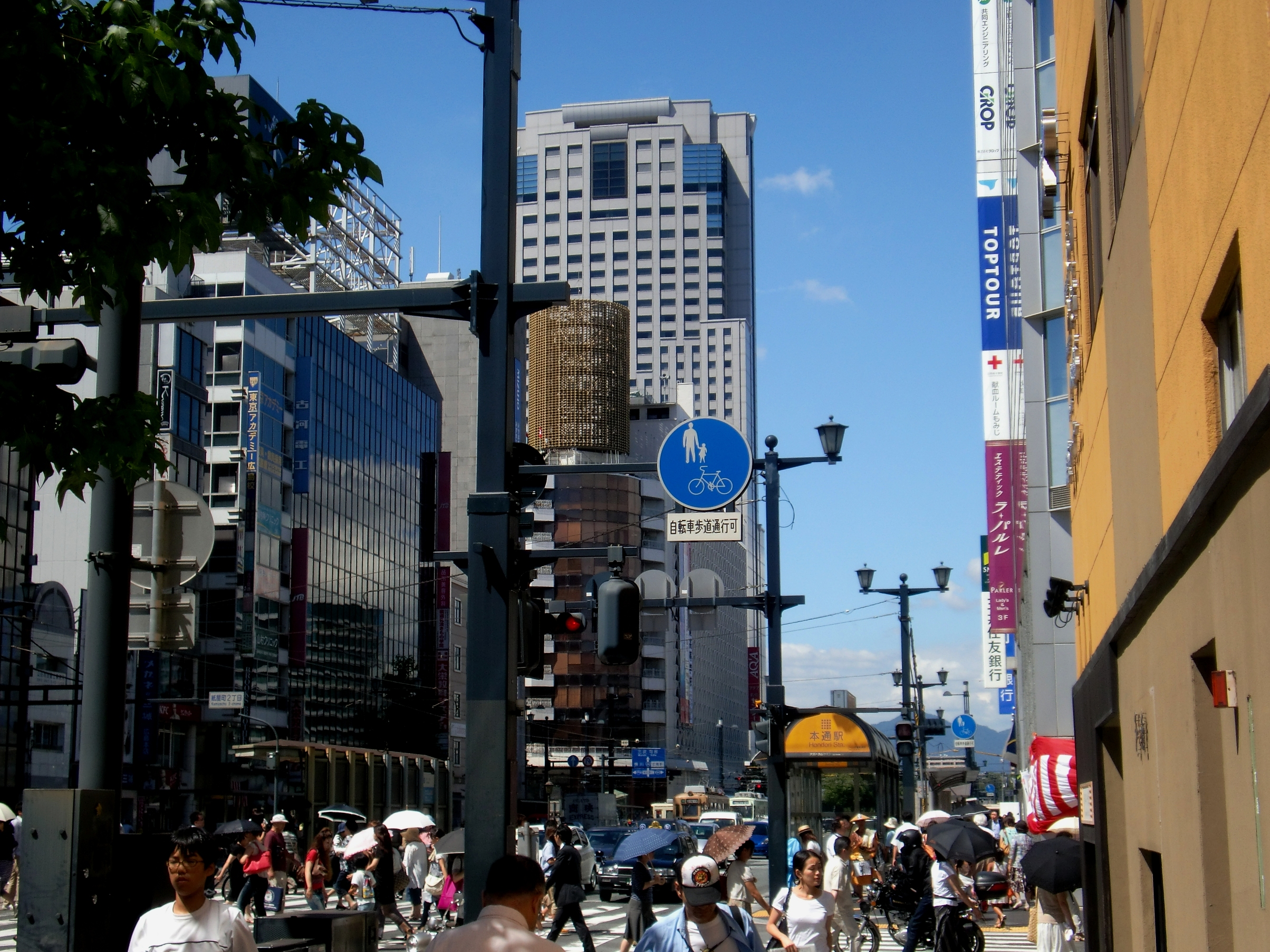
Around Hondōri Station (2010)

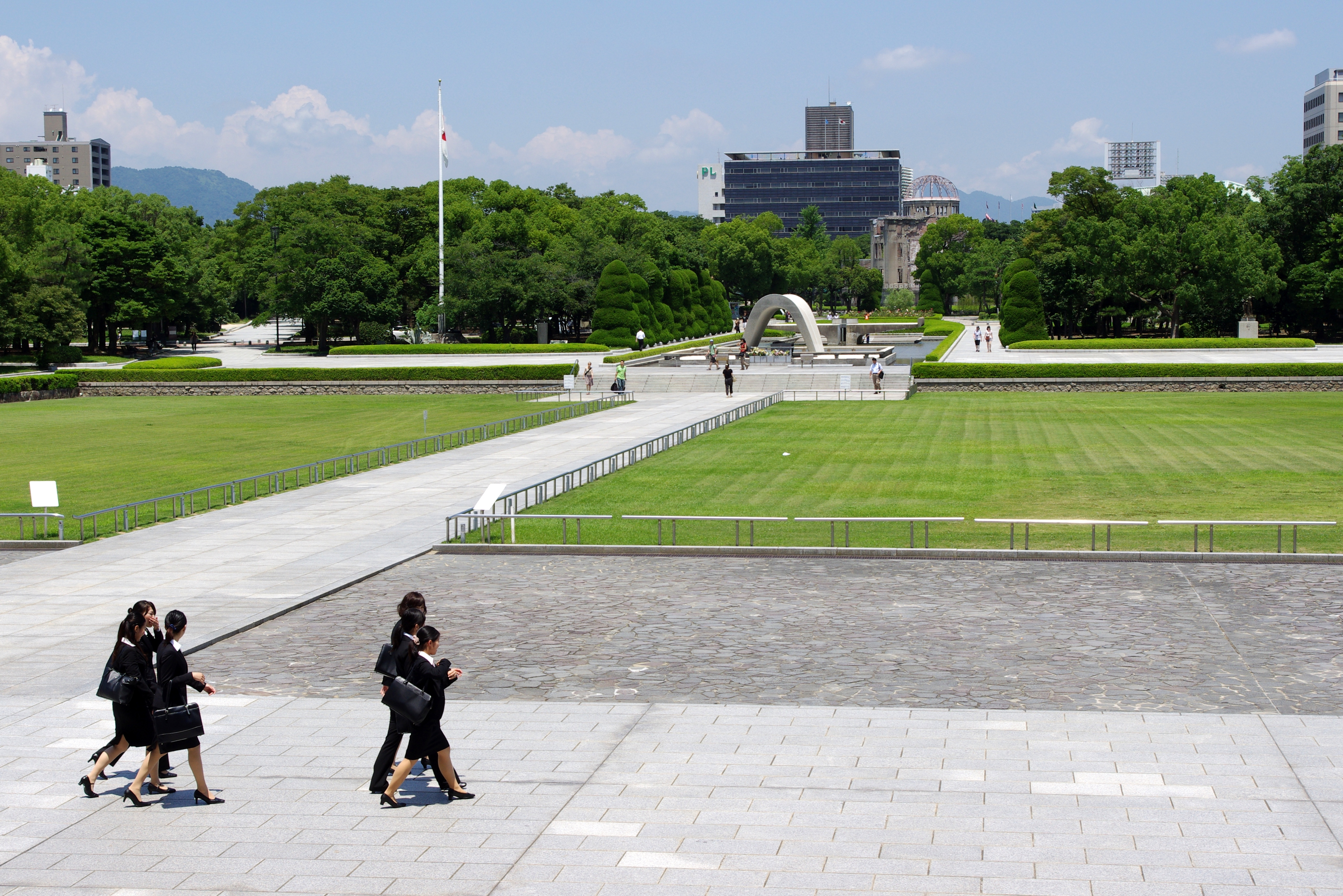
Hiroshima Peace Memorial Park (2010)

=== Demographics ===
Hiroshima prefecture population pyramid in 2020

Historical population
Year	Pop.	±%
1920	160,510	—
1925	195,731	+21.9%
1930	270,417	+38.2%
1935	310,118	+14.7%
1940	343,968	+10.9%
1945	137,197	−60.1%
1950	285,712	+108.2%
1955	357,287	+25.1%
1960	540,972	+51.4%
1965	665,289	+23.0%
1970	798,540	+20.0%
1975	862,611	+8.0%
1980	992,736	+15.1%
1985	1,044,118	+5.2%
1990	1,085,705	+4.0%
1995	1,105,203	+1.8%
2000	1,134,134	+2.6%
2005	1,151,888	+1.6%
2010	1,174,209	+1.9%
2015	1,186,655	+1.1%
2020	1,199,186	+1.1%

In 2017, the city had an estimated population of 1,195,327. The total area of the city is 905.08 square kilometres (349.45 sq mi), with a population density of 1321 persons per km^{2}. As of 2023, the city has a population of 1,183,696.

The population around 1910 was 143,000. Before World War II, Hiroshima's population had grown to 360,000, and peaked at 419,182 in 1942. Following the atomic bombing in 1945, the population dropped to 137,197. By 1955, the city's population had returned to pre-war levels.

=== Surrounding municipalities ===
Hiroshima Prefecture

- Kure
- Higashihiroshima
- Akitakata
- Hatsukaichi
- Akiota
- Kitahiroshima
- Fuchū
- Saka
- Kumano
- Kaita

== International relations ==
=== Twin towns – sister cities ===
Hiroshima has six sister cities:

- Chongqing, China (since October 1986)
- Daegu, South Korea (since May 1997)
- Hanover, Germany (since June 1983)
- Honolulu, United States (since June 1959)
- Montreal, Canada (since June 1998)
- Volgograd, Russia (since September 1972)

Within Japan, Hiroshima has a similar relationship with Nagasaki.

== Economy and infrastructure ==
- Mazda Motor Corporation
- Mitsubishi, Kawasaki, JMUcor IHI Kure Works, Mitsui and other shipyards on the area
- Mitsubishi HI Kanon and Eba Works, IHI Kure machinery

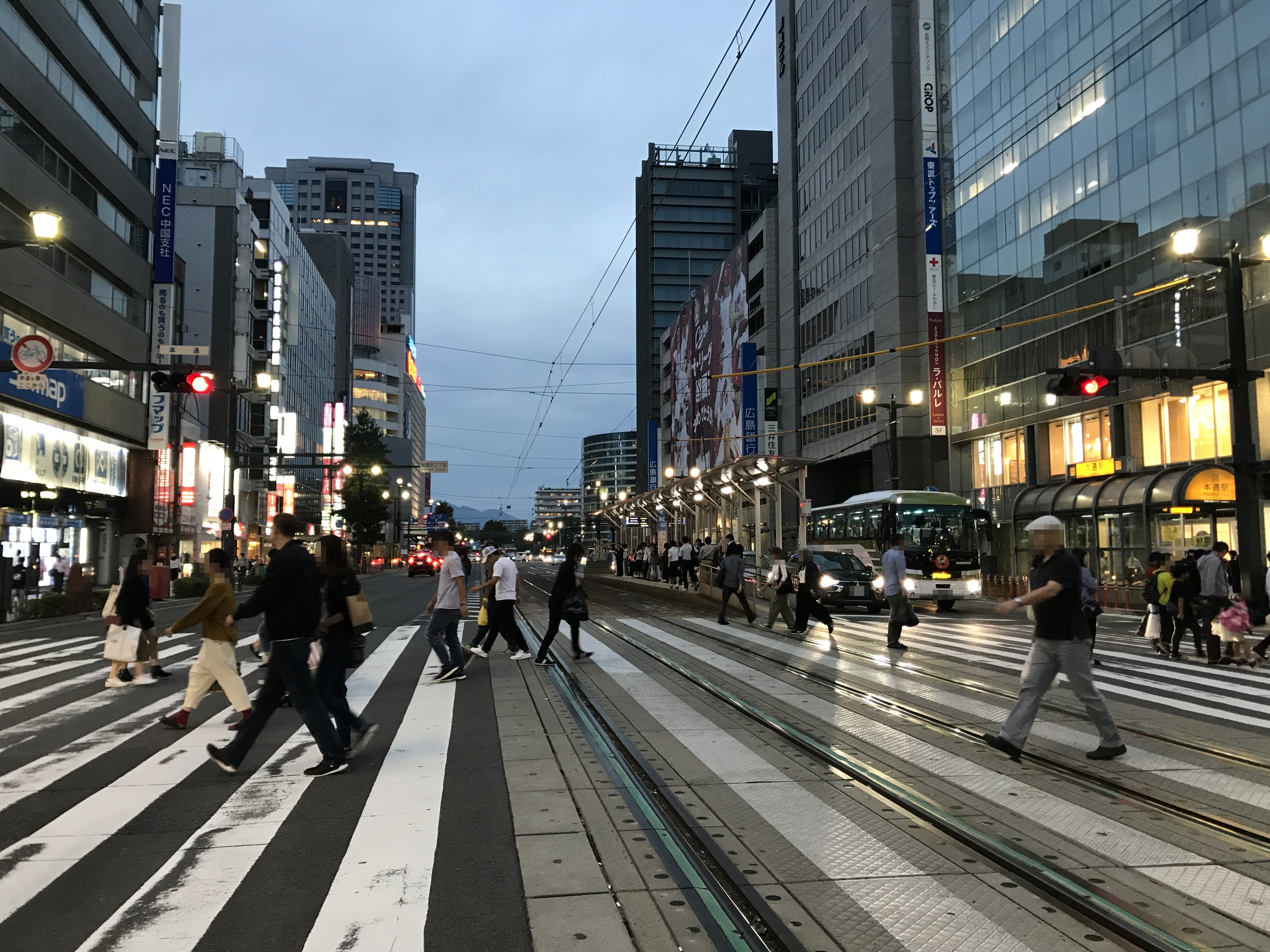
Downtown Hiroshima

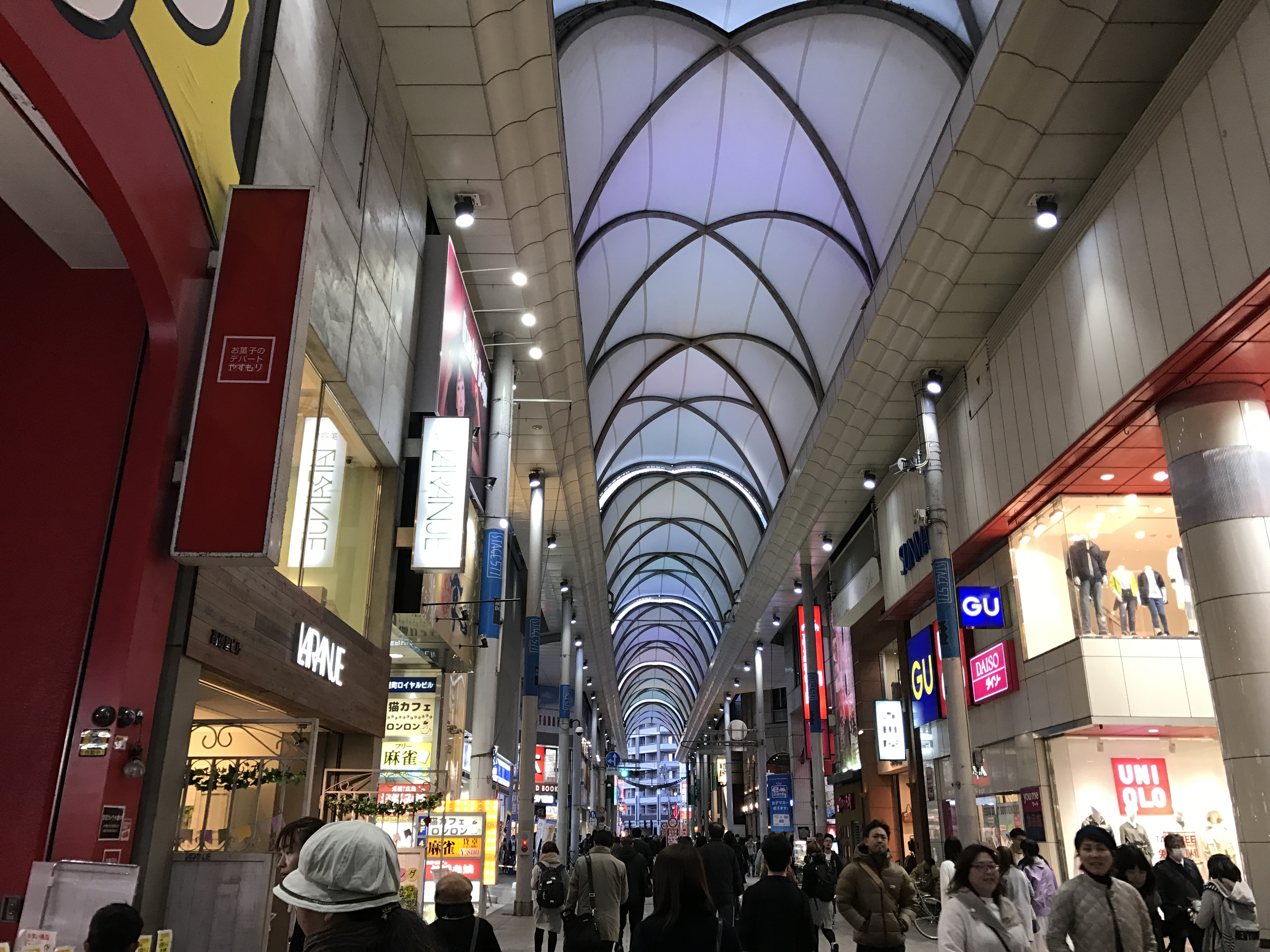
Hondōri Shopping Street

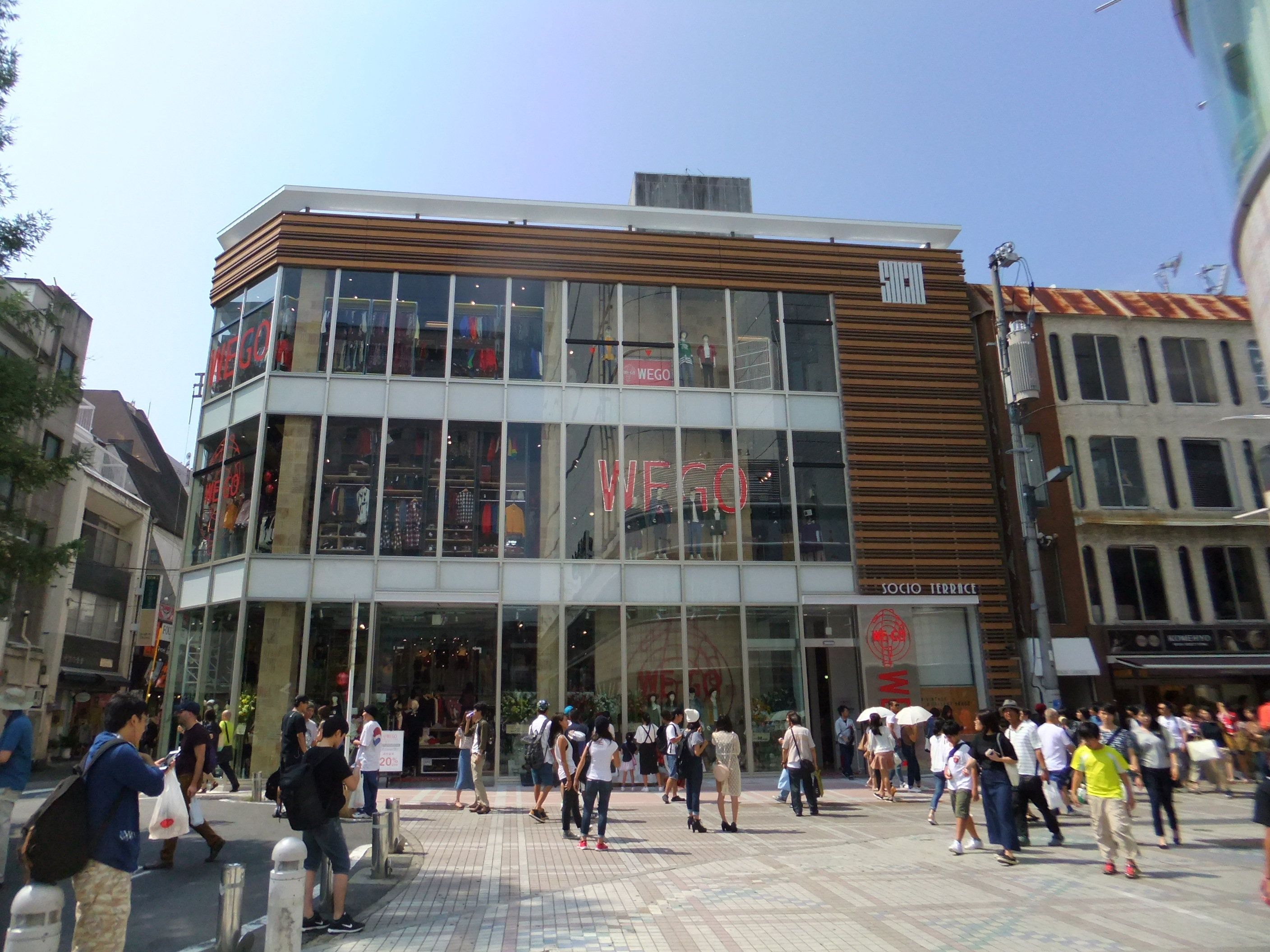
Hiroshima Zero Gate

== Media ==
The Chūgoku Shimbun is the local newspaper serving Hiroshima. It publishes both morning and evening editions. Television stations include Hiroshima Home Television, Hiroshima Telecasting, Shinhiroshima Telecasting, and the RCC Broadcasting. Radio stations include Hiroshima FM, Chugoku Communication Network, FM Fukuyama, FM Nanami, and Onomichi FM. Hiroshima is also served by NHK, Japan's public broadcaster, with television and radio broadcasting.

== Education ==
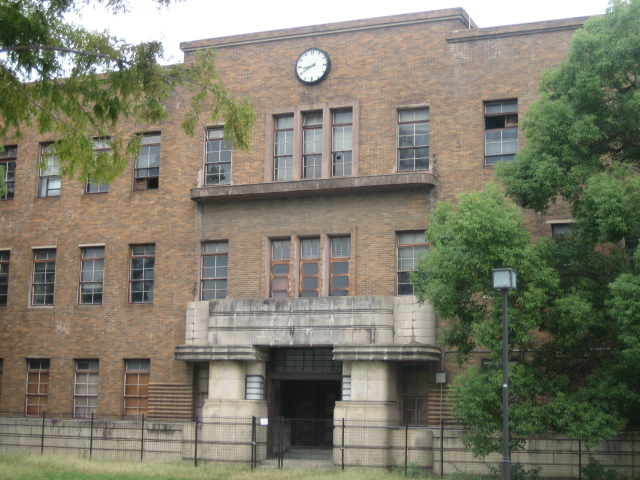
Former Faculty of Science Building No. 1 at Hiroshima University

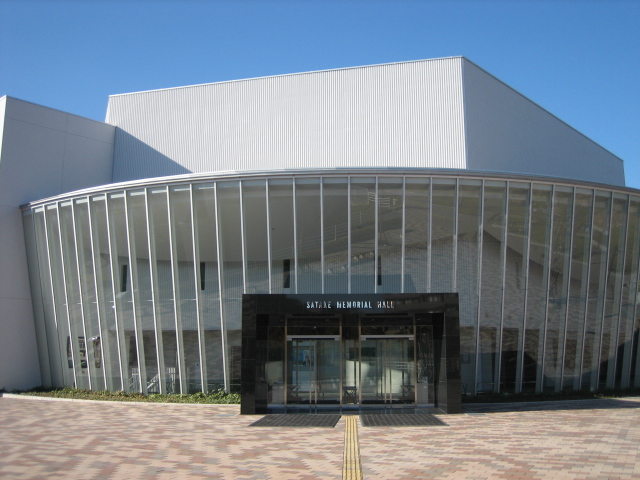
Satake Memorial Hall at Hiroshima University in Higashihiroshima City

=== University ===
Hiroshima University was established in 1949, as part of a national restructuring of the education system. One national university was set up in each prefecture, including Hiroshima University, which combined eight existing institutions (Hiroshima University of Literature and Science, Hiroshima School of Secondary Education, Hiroshima School of Education, Hiroshima Women's School of Secondary Education, Hiroshima School of Education for Youth, Hiroshima Higher School, Hiroshima Higher Technical School, and Hiroshima Municipal Higher Technical School), with the Hiroshima Prefectural Medical College added in 1953. In 1972, Hiroshima University moved from Hiroshima City to a larger campus in Higashihiroshima City. By 1995, almost all campuses were relocated to Higashihiroshima. The schools of medicine, dentistry, pharmaceutical sciences, and the graduate schools in these fields on the Kasumi Campus and the law school and Center for Research on Regional Economic System on the Higashi-Senda Campus are still in Hiroshima City.

Notable art institutions include the Elisabeth University of Music and Actor's School Hiroshima.

== Notable people ==
- Reiji Okazaki (岡崎 令治, 1930–1975), molecular biologist, discoverer of Okazaki fragments
- Mika Kobayashi, singer and musician
- Kumi Tanioka, composer and pianist
- Suzuka Nakamoto, Babymetal singer
- Nozomu Sasaki, voice actor and singer
- Mana, visual kei musician
- Unicorn (Japanese band), rock band
- Perfume (Japanese band), girl group
- Sohji Izumi, actor

== Transportation ==
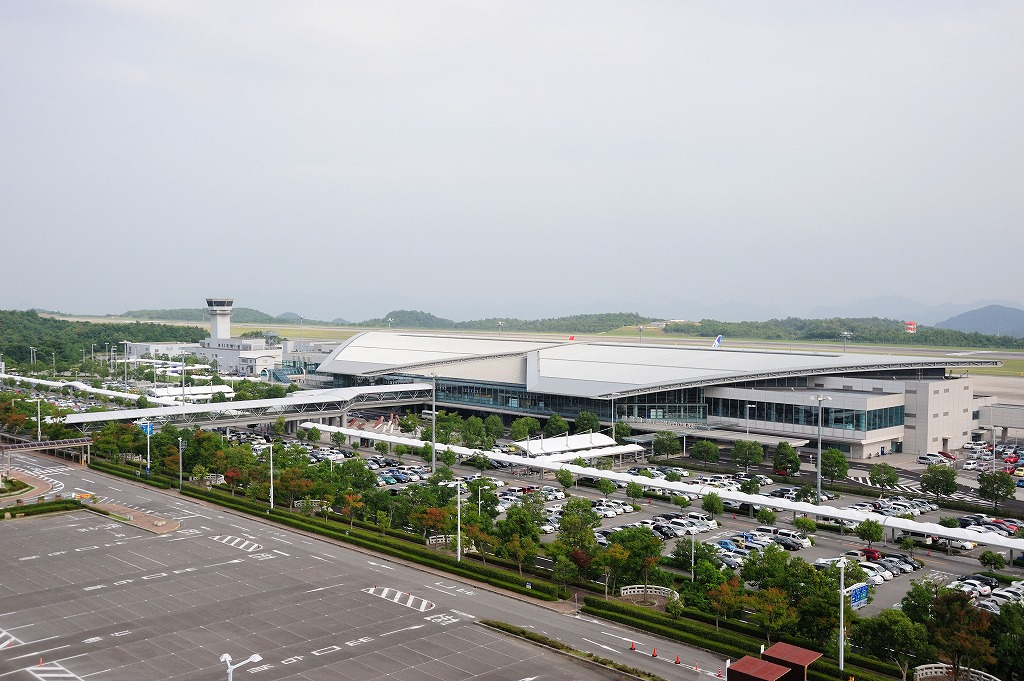
Hiroshima Airport

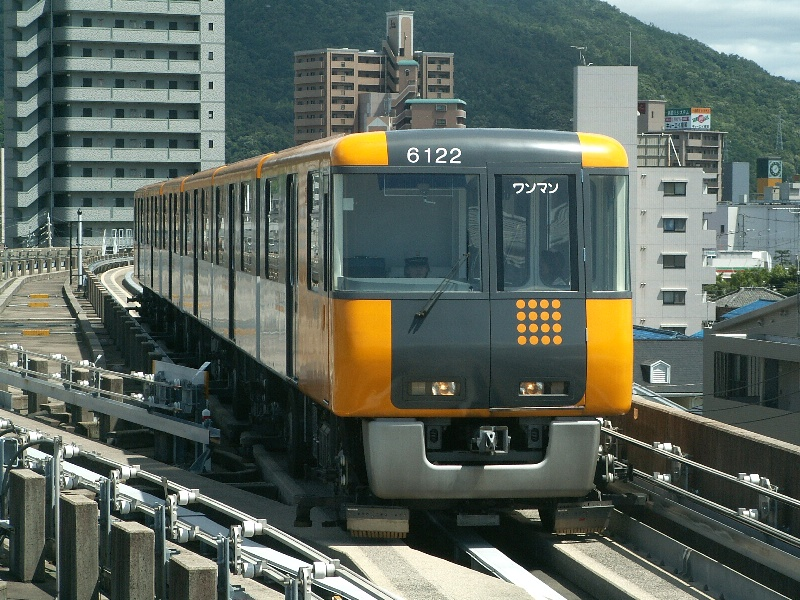
Astram Line

=== Airways ===
==== Airport ====
Hiroshima is served by Hiroshima Airport (IATA: HIJ, ICAO: RJOA), located 50 kilometres (31 mi) east of the city, with regular flights to Tokyo, Sapporo, Sendai, Okinawa, and also to China, Taiwan and South Korea.

The other nearest airport is Iwakuni Kintaikyo Airport, located 43 kilometres (27 mi) south-west of Hiroshima, re-instated commercial flights on December 13, 2012.

=== Railways ===
==== High-speed rail ====
JR West

- San'yō Shinkansen

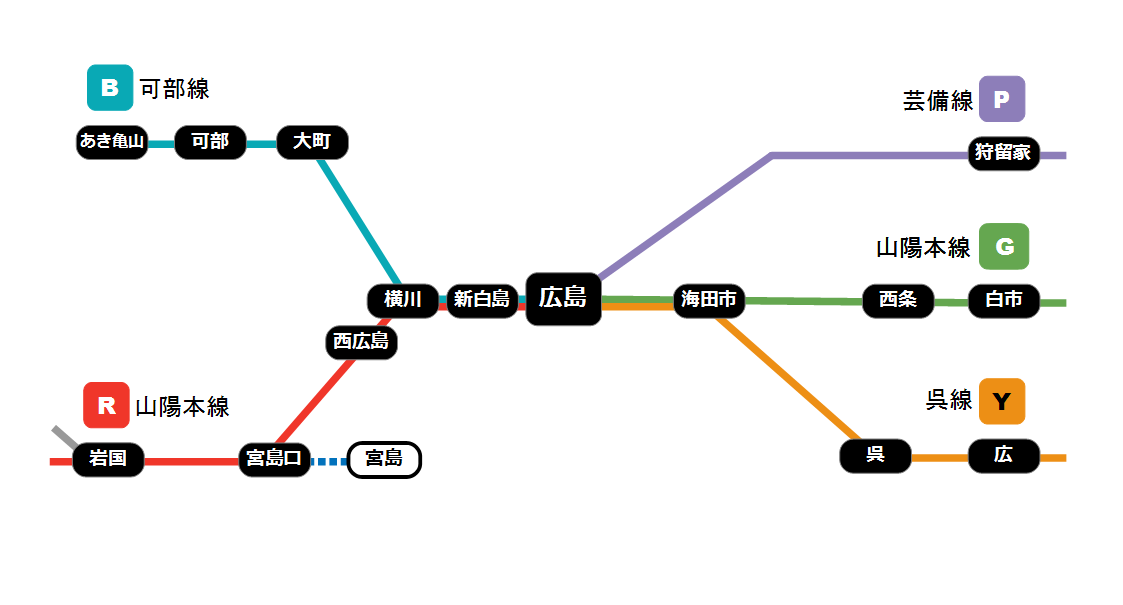
Hiroshima City Network

==== Trains ====
JR West

- Hiroshima City Network: San'yō Main Line, Kure Line, Geibi Line, Kabe Line

Hiroshima Rapid Transit

- Hiroshima New Transit Line 1 (Astram Line)

Skyrail Service

- Hiroshima Short Distance Transit Seno Line

=== Tramways ===
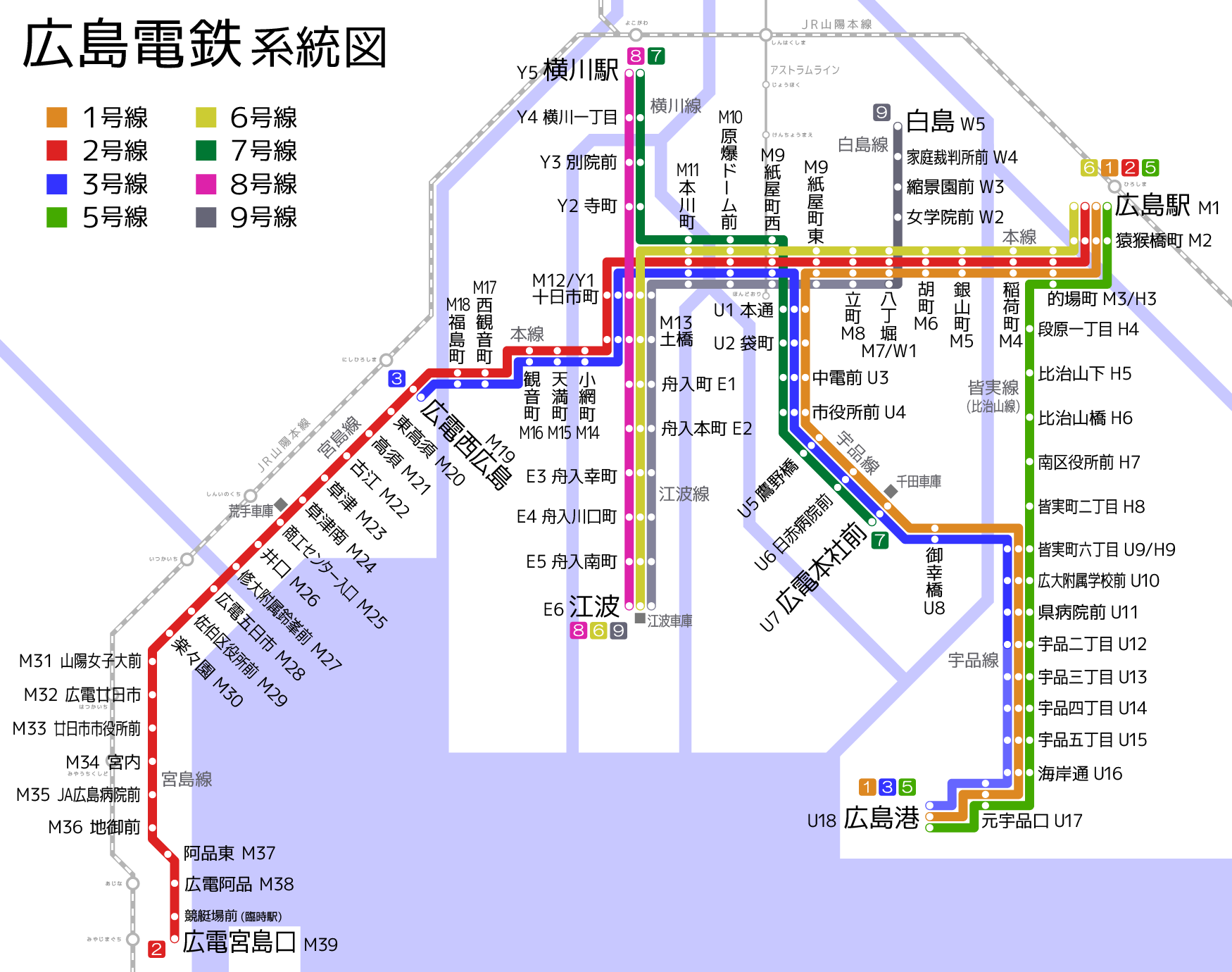
Hiroden route map

Hiroshima is notable, in Japan, for its light rail system, nicknamed Hiroden, and the "Moving Streetcar Museum". Streetcar service started in 1912, was interrupted by the atomic bomb, and was restored as soon as was practical. (Service between Koi/Nishi Hiroshima and Tenma-cho was started up three days after the bombing.)

Streetcars and light rail vehicles are still rolling down Hiroshima's streets, including streetcars 651 and 652, which survived the atomic blast and are among the older streetcars in the system. When Kyoto and Fukuoka discontinued their trolley systems, Hiroshima bought them up at discounted prices, and, by 2011, the city had 298 streetcars, more than any other city in Japan.

- Hiroden
  - Main Line, Ujina Line, Eba Line, Hakushima Line, Hijiyama Line, Yokogawa Line, Miyajima Line

=== Roads ===
==== Expressway ====
- Hiroshima Expressway

==== Japan National Route ====
Hiroshima is served by Japan National Route 2, Japan National Route 54, Japan National Route 183, Japan National Route 261, Japan National Route 433, Japan National Route 487, Japan National Route 488.

==== Prefectural Route ====
Hiroshima Prefectural Route 37 (Hiroshima-Miyoshi Route), Hiroshima Prefectural Route 70 (Hiroshima-Nakashima Route), Hiroshima Prefectural Route 84 (Higashi Kaita Hiroshima Route), Hiroshima Prefectural Route 164 (Hiroshima-Kaita Route), and Hiroshima Prefectural Route 264 (Nakayama-Onaga Route).

=== Seaways ===
==== Seaport ====
- Port of Hiroshima

==== Sealane ====
Ishizaki Kisen

- Port of Hiroshima - Port of Kure - Port of Matsuyama

First Beach

- Port of Hiroshima - Port of Etajima

Other

- Port of Hiroshima - Nino-shima Island
- Port of Hiroshima - Kanawa-jima Island
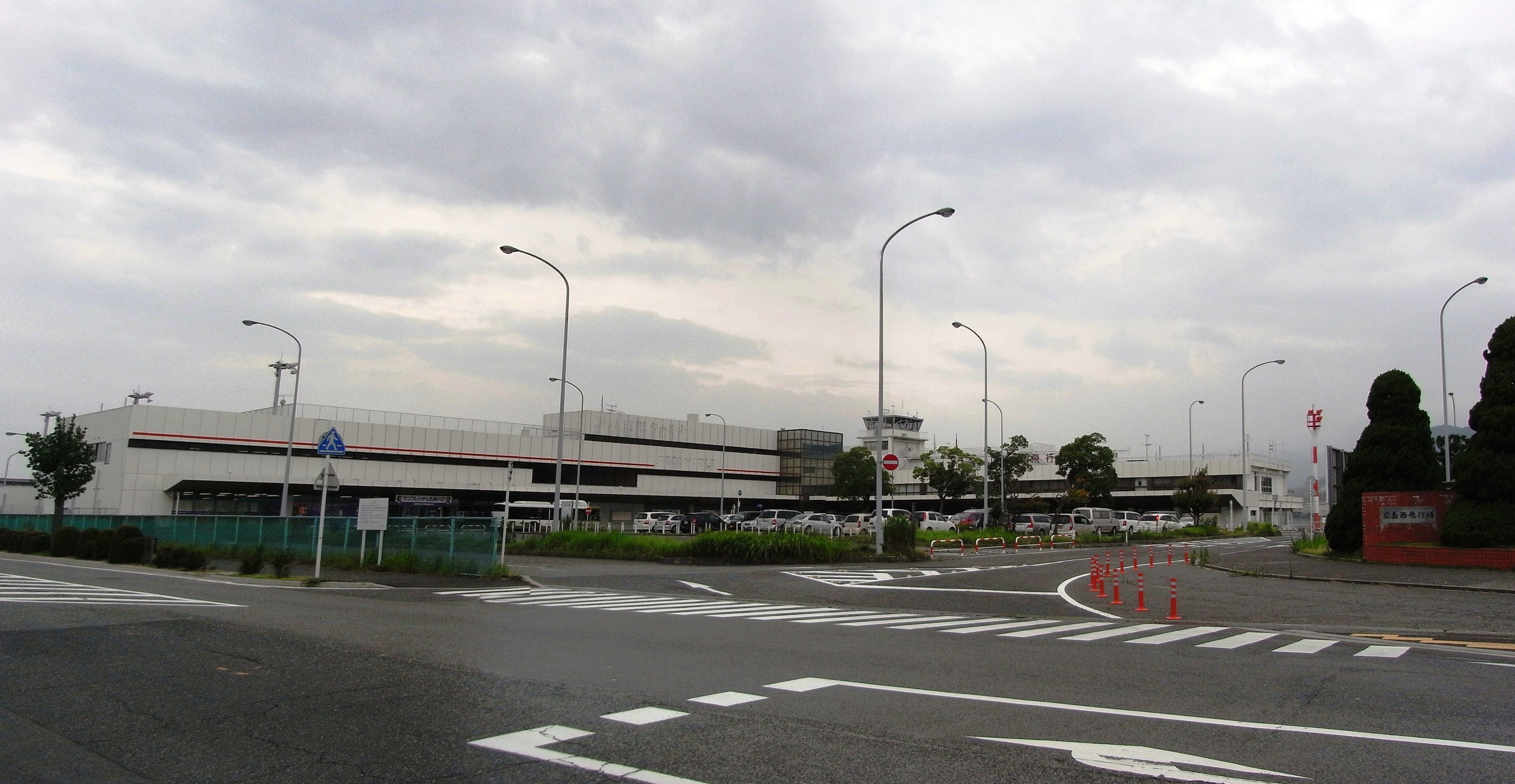
Hiroshima–Nishi Airport

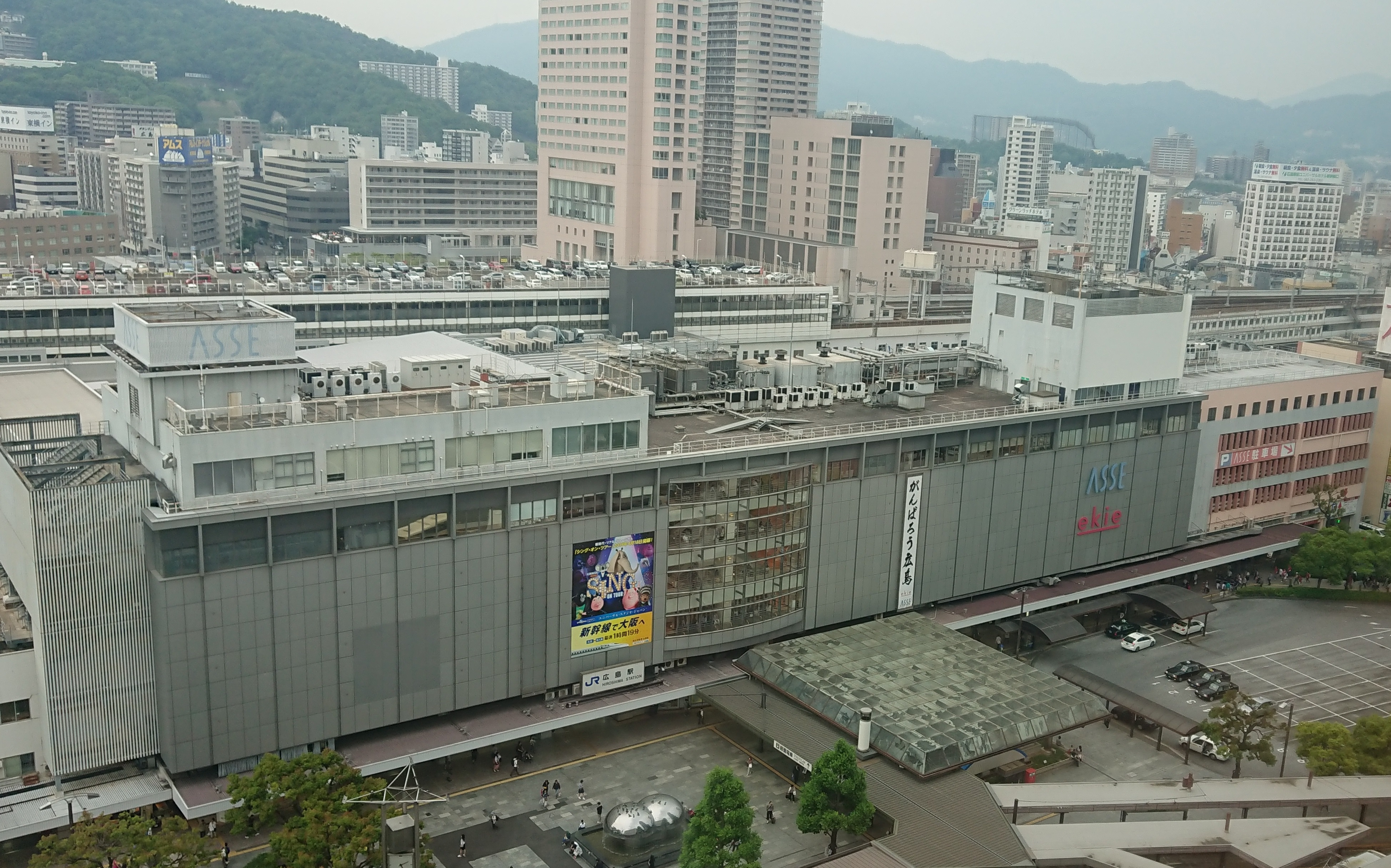
Hiroshima Station

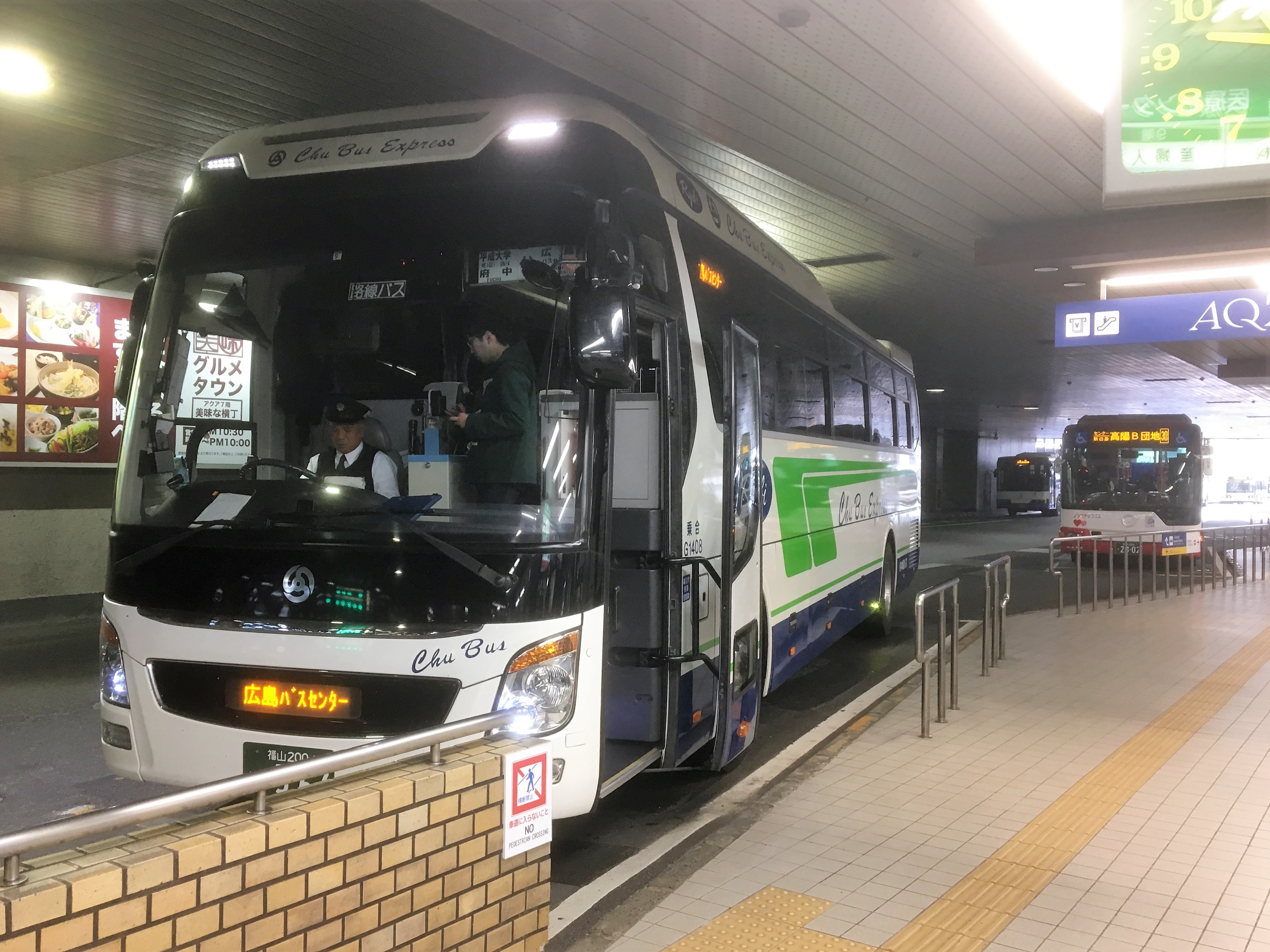
Hiroshima Bus Center

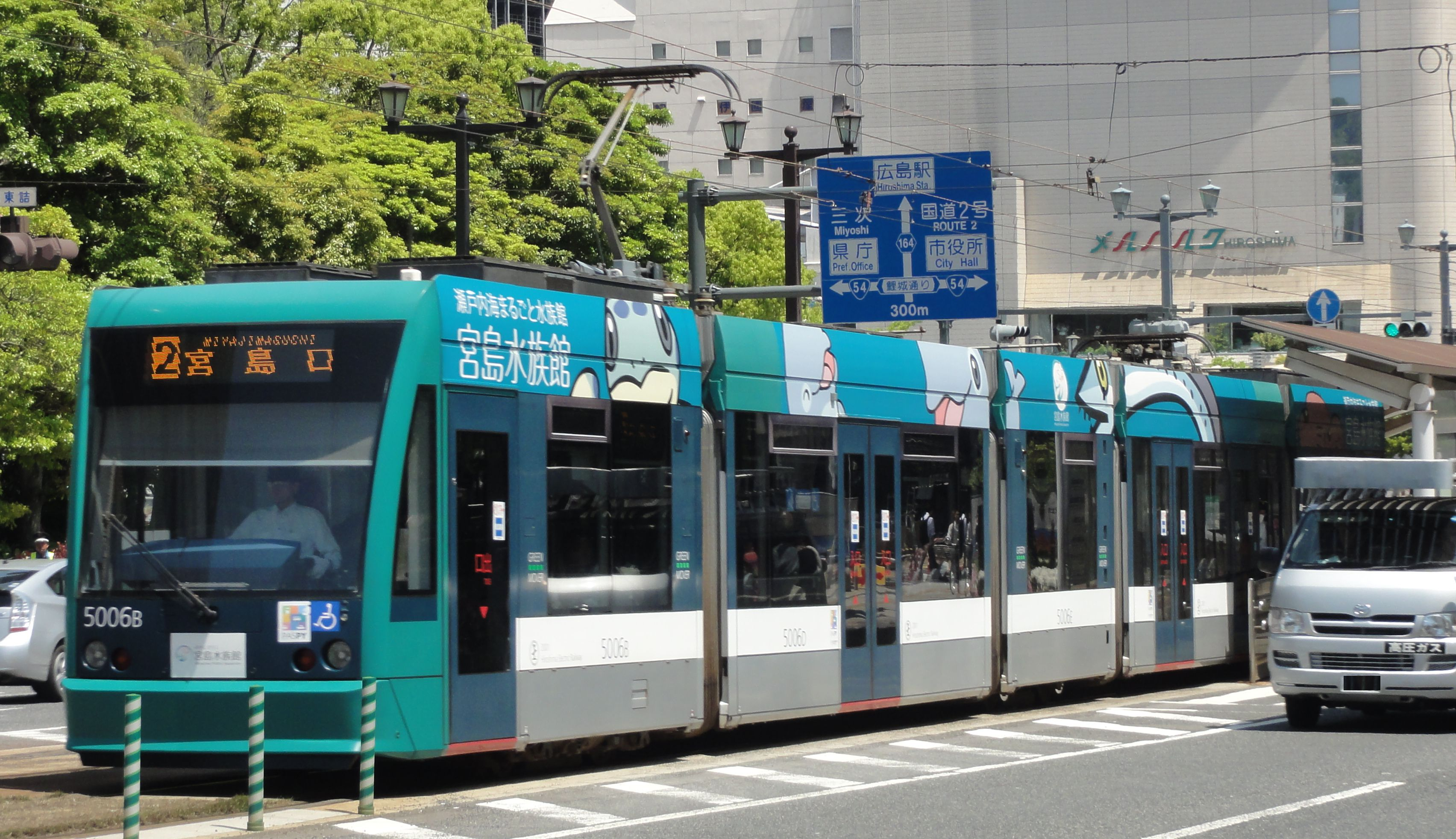
A Hiroshima tram, 2015

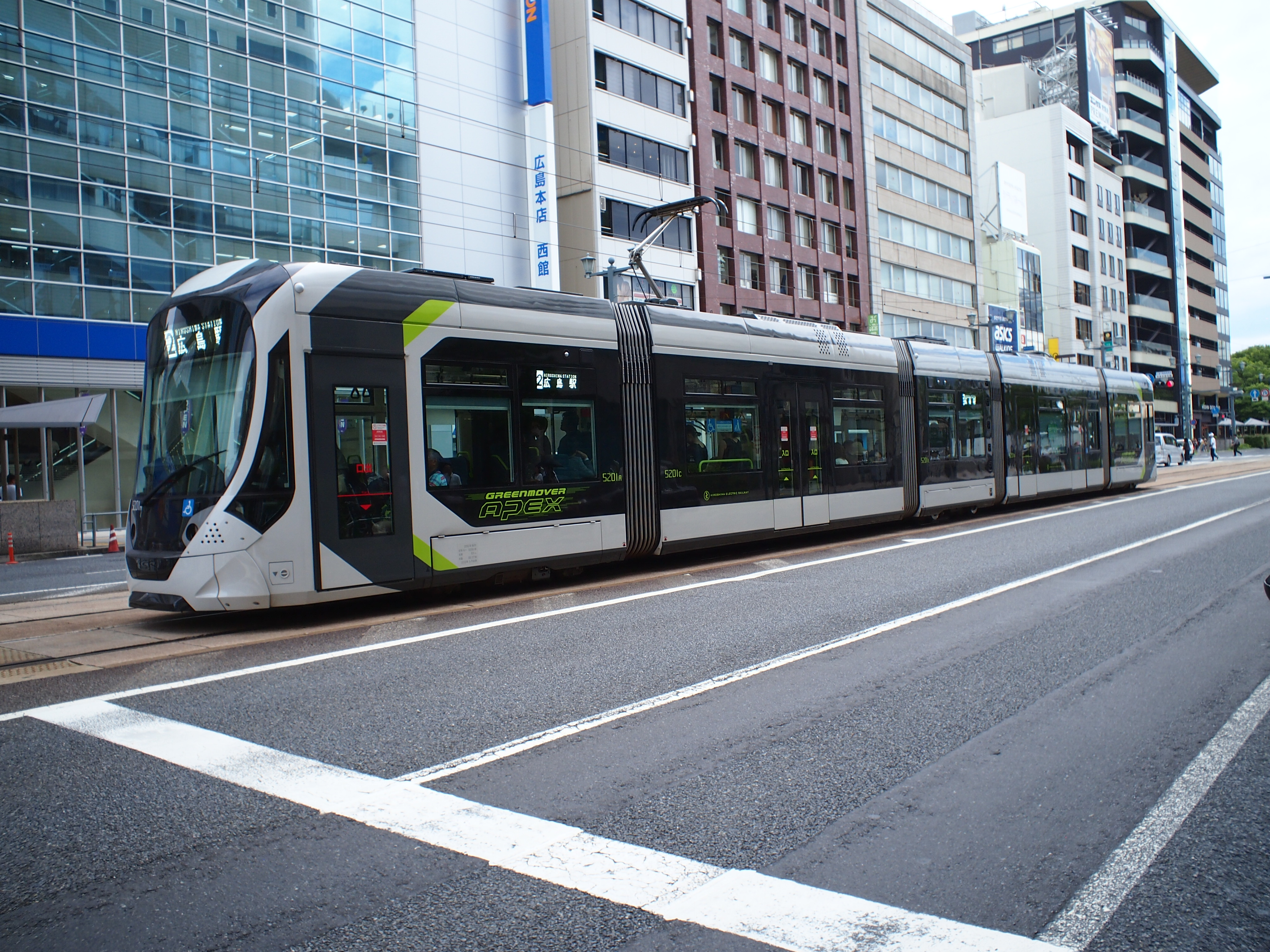
Hiroden

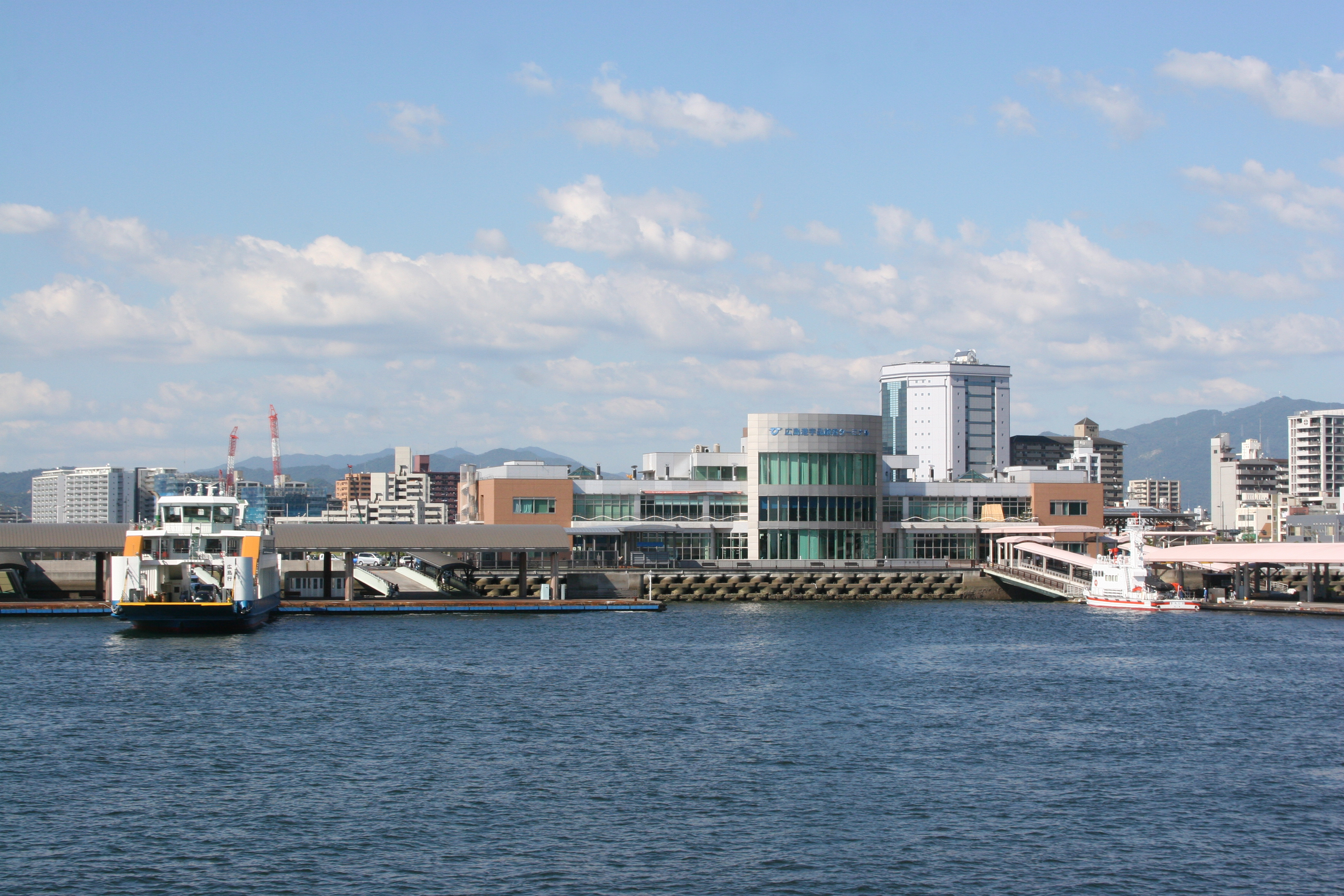
Port of Hiroshima

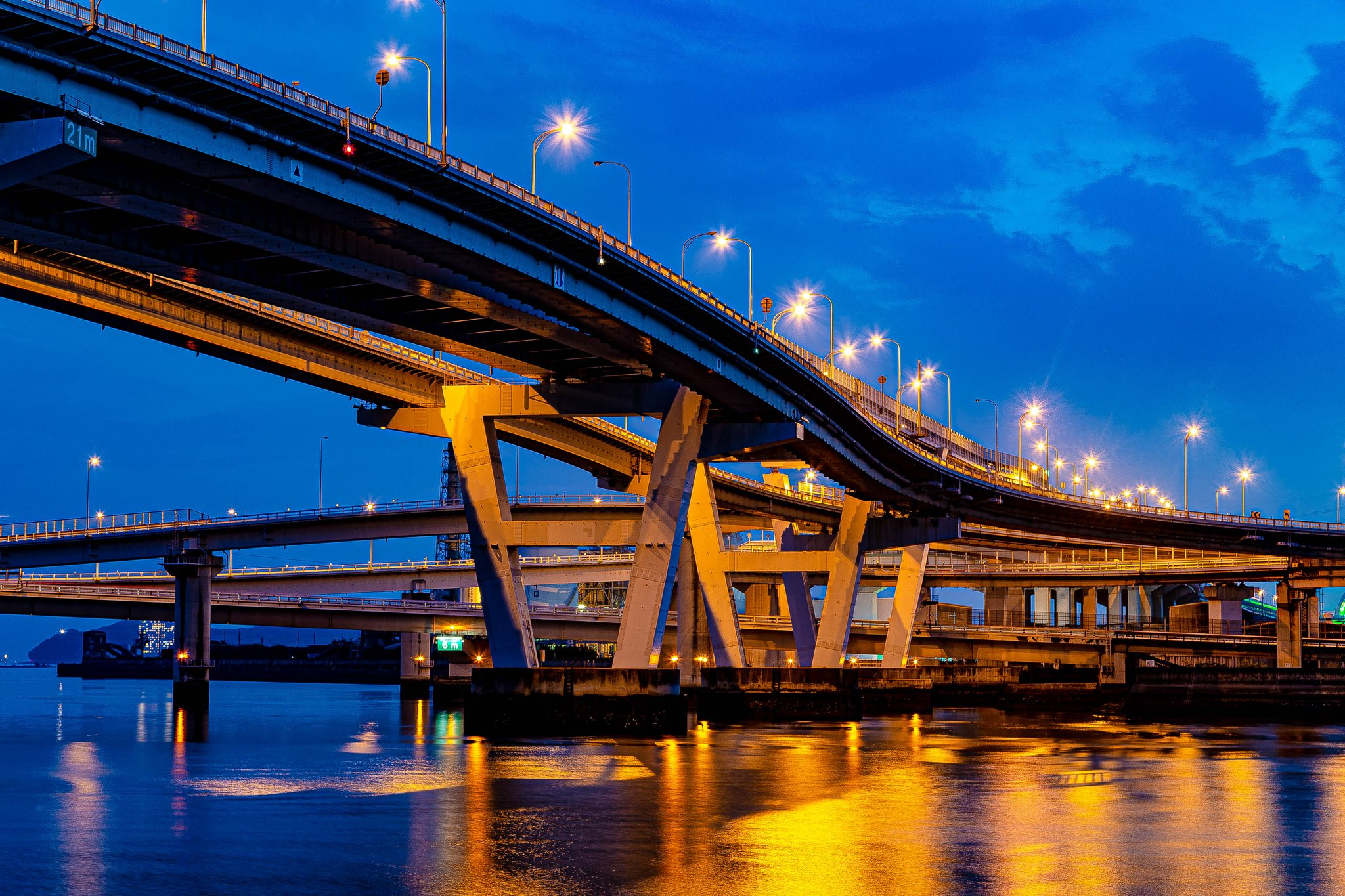
Niho JCT

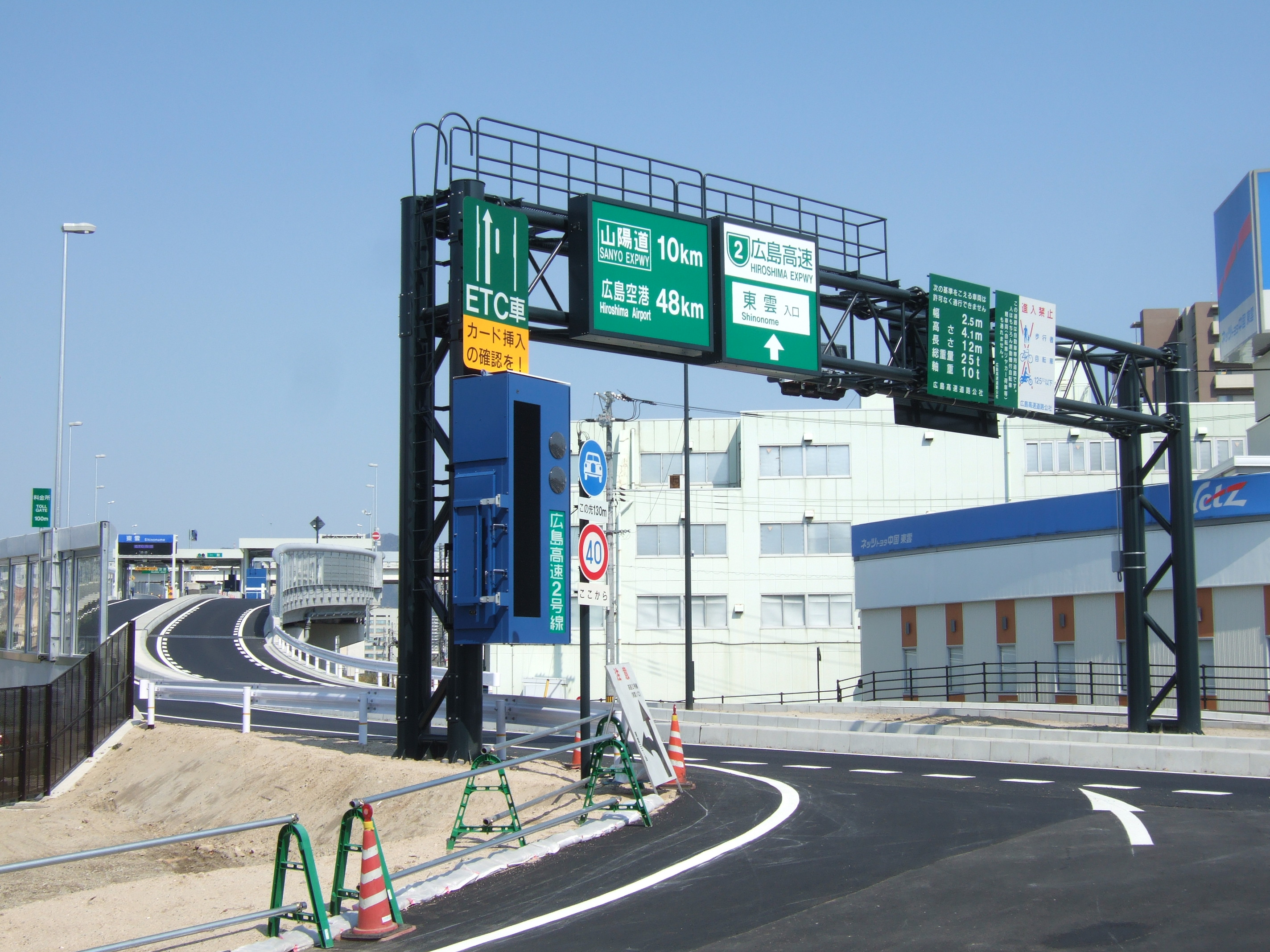
Hiroshima Expressway

== Culture ==
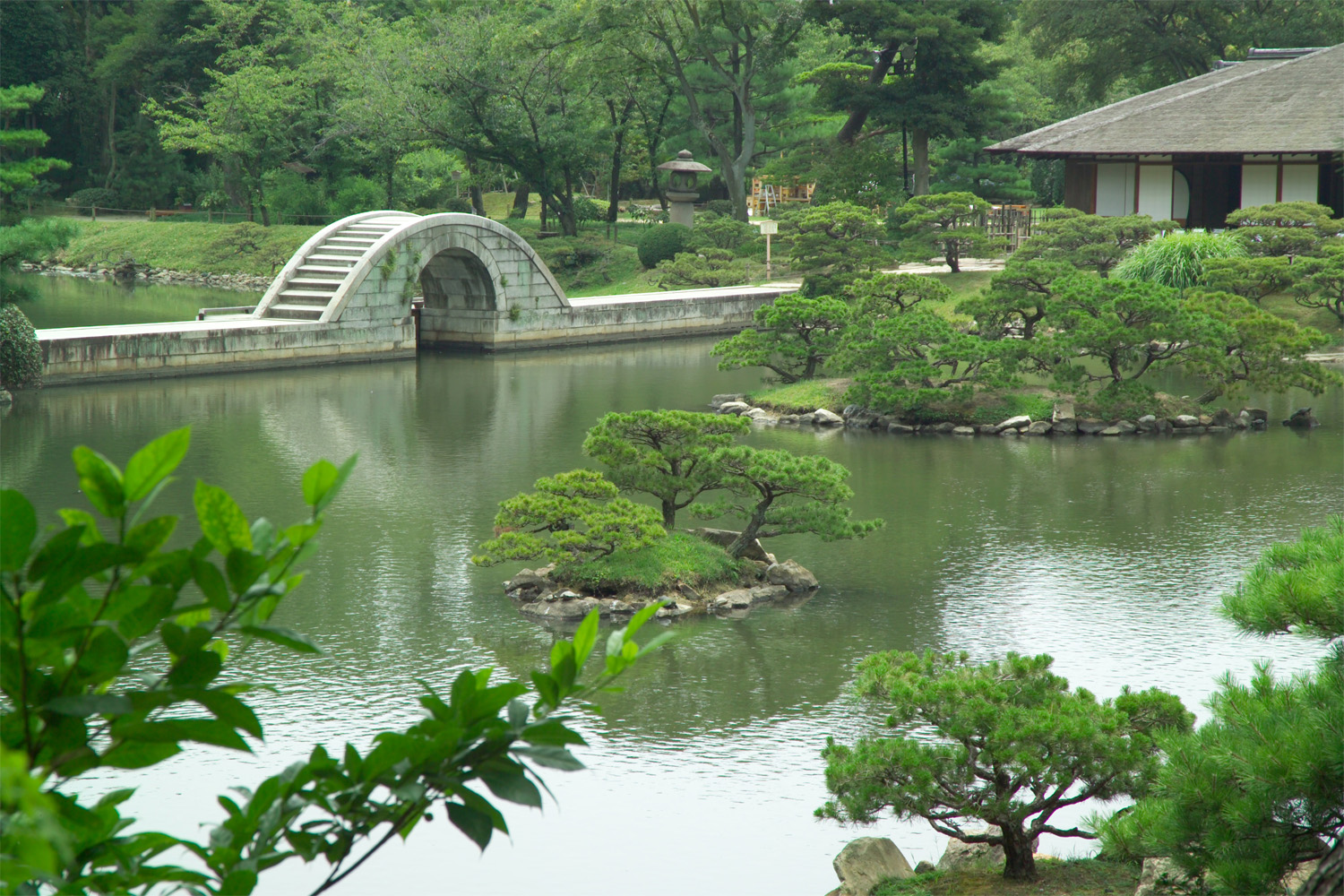
Shukkei-en

Hiroshima has a professional symphony orchestra, which has performed at Wel City Hiroshima since 1963. There are also many museums in Hiroshima, including the Hiroshima Peace Memorial Museum, along with several art museums. The Hiroshima Museum of Art, which has a large collection of French renaissance art, opened in 1978. The Hiroshima Prefectural Art Museum opened in 1968 and is located near Shukkei-en gardens. The Hiroshima City Museum of Contemporary Art, which opened in 1989, is located near Hijiyama Park.

Festivals include Hiroshima Flower Festival and Hiroshima International Film Festival. The Hiroshima International Animation Festival was held biennially from 1985 until 2020.

Hiroshima Peace Memorial Park, which includes the Hiroshima Peace Memorial, draws many visitors from around the world, especially for the Hiroshima Peace Memorial Ceremony, an annual commemoration held on the date of the atomic bombing. The park also contains a large collection of monuments, including the Children's Peace Monument, the Hiroshima National Peace Memorial Hall for the Atomic Bomb Victims and many others.

Hiroshima's rebuilt castle (nicknamed Rijō, meaning Koi Castle) houses a museum of life in the Edo period. Hiroshima Gokoku Shrine is within the walls of the castle. Other attractions in Hiroshima include Shukkei-en, Fudōin, Mitaki-dera, Hiroshima Tōshō-gū, and Hijiyama Park.

=== Events ===
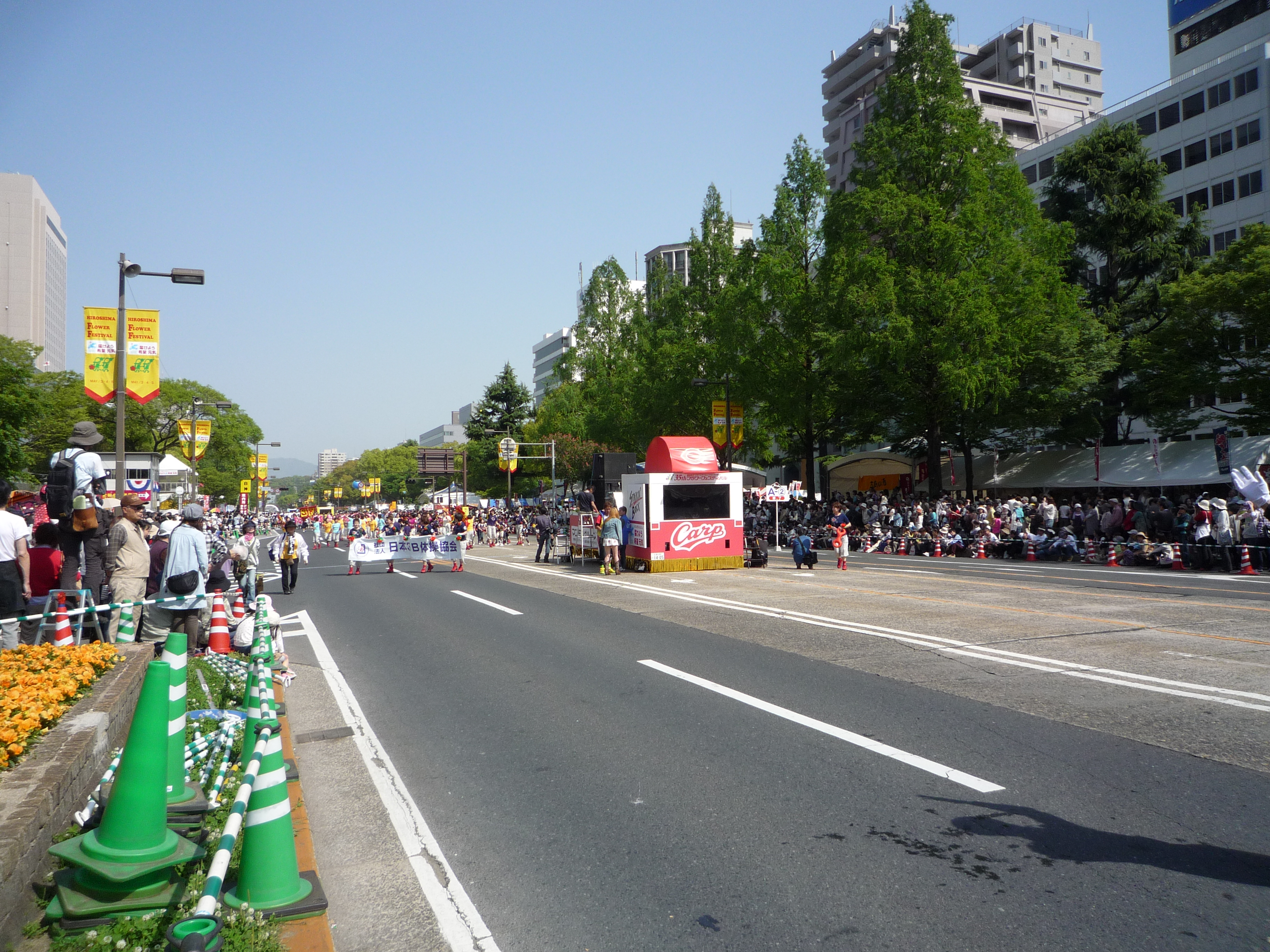
Hiroshima Flower Festival 2011

- 1994 Asian Games
- Ebisu Festival, November, Ebisucho, Hacchobori, Chuo Dori
- Hiroshima Flower Festival, May, Heiwa Odori, Hiroshima Peace Memorial Park
- Hiroshima International Film Festival, held annually in November
- Hiroshima Peace Memorial Ceremony, August 6, Hiroshima Peace Memorial Park
- Toukasan, first Friday to Sunday in June, Mikawa-Cho, Chuo Dori

=== Cuisine ===
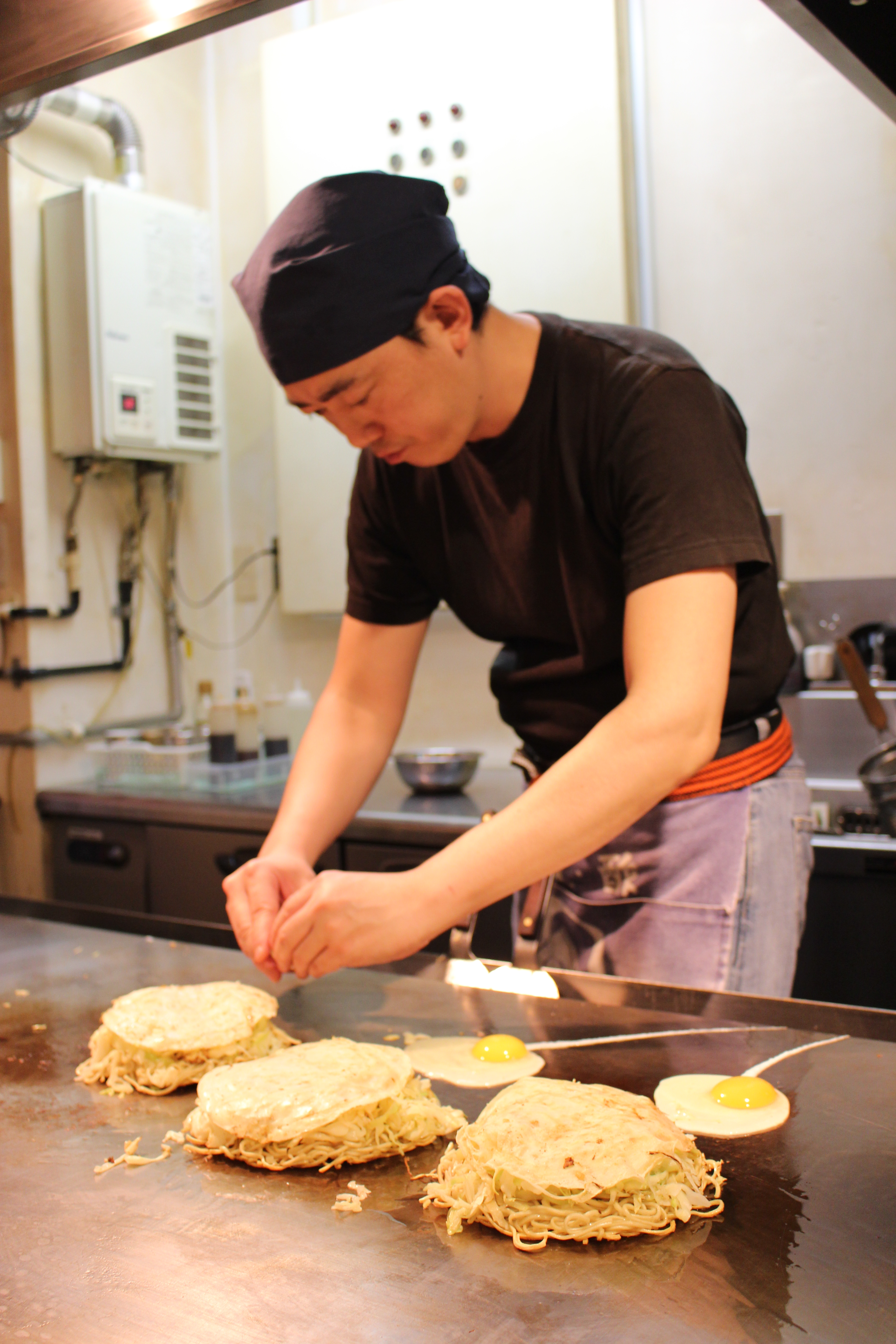
A man making an okonomiyaki at a restaurant in Hiroshima

Hiroshima is known for okonomiyaki, a savory (umami) pancake cooked on an iron plate, usually in front of the customer. It is cooked with various ingredients, which are layered rather than mixed as done with the Osaka version of okonomiyaki. The layers are typically egg, cabbage, bean sprouts (moyashi), sliced pork/bacon with optional items (mayonnaise, fried squid, octopus, cheese, mochi, kimchi, etc.), and noodles (soba, udon) topped with another layer of egg and a generous dollop of okonomiyaki sauce (Carp and Otafuku are two popular brands). The amount of cabbage used is usually 3 to 4 times the amount used in the Osaka style. It starts piled very high and is generally pushed down as the cabbage cooks. The order of the layers may vary slightly depending on the chef's style and preference, and ingredients will vary depending on the preference of the customer.

=== Sports ===
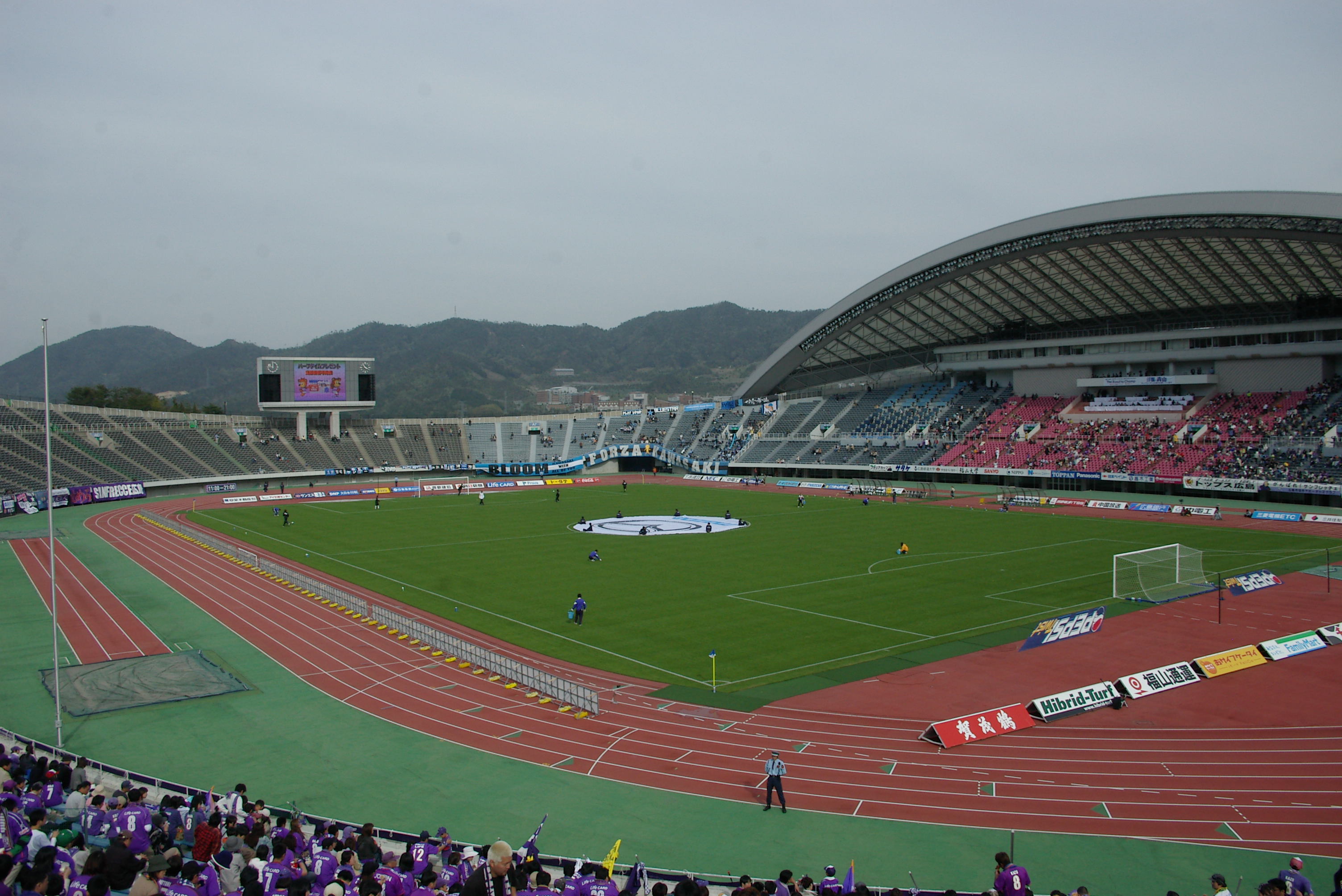
Edion Stadium Hiroshima

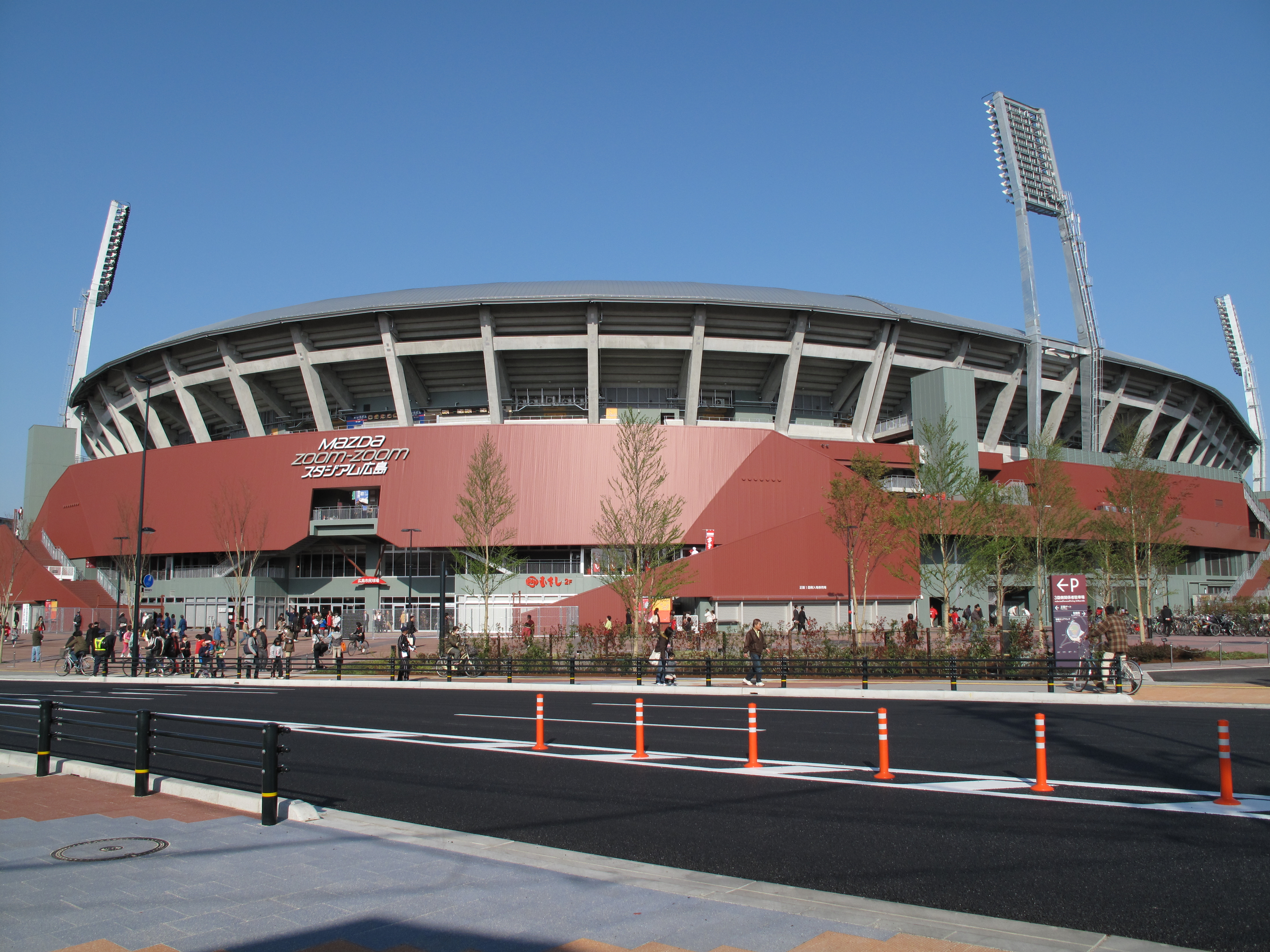
Mazda Stadium, home of Hiroshima Toyo Carp

Hiroshima has several professional sports clubs.

==== Football ====
The city's main association football club is Sanfrecce Hiroshima, who play at the Edion Peace Wing Hiroshima. As Toyo Kogyo Soccer Club, they won the Japan Soccer League five times between 1965 and 1970 and the Emperor's Cup in 1965, 1967 and 1969. After adopting their current name in 1992, the club won the J.League in 2012, 2013 and 2015.

The city's main women's football club is Angeviolet Hiroshima. Defunct clubs include Rijo Shukyu FC, who won the Emperor's Cup in 1924 and 1925, and Ẽfini Hiroshima SC.

==== Baseball ====
Hiroshima Toyo Carp are the city's major baseball club, and play at the Mazda Zoom-Zoom Stadium Hiroshima. Members of the Central League, the club won the Central League in 1975, 1979, 1980, 1984, 1986, 1991, 2016, 2017 and 2018, the club won the Japan Series in 1979, 1980 and 1984.

==== Basketball ====
Hiroshima Dragonflies (basketball).

==== Handball ====
Hiroshima Maple Reds (handball).

==== Volleyball ====
JT Thunders (volleyball).

==== Other sports ====
The Woodone Open Hiroshima was part of the Japan Golf Tour between 1973 and 2007. The city also hosted the 1994 Asian Games, using the Big Arch stadium, which is now used for the annual Mikio Oda Memorial International Amateur Athletic Game. The now-called Hiroshima Prefectural Sports Center was one of the host arenas of the 2006 FIBA World Championship (basketball).

== Tourism ==
The Japanese city and the Prefecture of Hiroshima may have been devastated by the atomic bomb 81 years ago, but today, this site of the destruction is one of the top tourist destinations in the entire country. Statistics released by the nation's tourist agency revealed that around 363,000 visitors went to the metropolis during 2012, with Americans making up the vast majority of that figure, followed by Australians and Chinese. In 2016, some 1.18 million foreigners visited Hiroshima, a 3.2-fold jump from about 360,000 in 2012. Americans were the largest group, accounting for 16%, followed by Australians at 15%, Italians at 8% and Britons at 6%. The numbers of Chinese and South Korean visitors were small, representing only 1% and 0.2% of the total.

=== Places of interest ===
There are many popular tourist destinations near Hiroshima. A popular destination outside the city is Itsukushima Island, also known as Miyajima, which is a sacred island with many temples and shrines. But inside Hiroshima there are many popular destinations as well, and according to online guidebooks, these are the most popular tourist destinations in Hiroshima:

1. Hiroshima Peace Memorial Museum
2. The Atomic Bomb Dome
3. Hiroshima Peace Memorial Park
4. Mazda Zoom-Zoom Stadium Hiroshima
5. Hiroshima Castle
6. Shukkei-en
7. Mitaki-dera Temple
8. Hiroshima Gokoku Shrine
9. Kamiyacho and Hatchobori (A major center in Hiroshima which is a shopping area. It is directly connected to the Hiroshima Bus Center)
10. Hiroshima City Asa Zoological Park
11. Hiroshima Botanical Garden

Other popular places in the city include the Hondōri shopping arcade.
