= Adriatic Sea =

Body of water between the Italian and Balkan Peninsulas

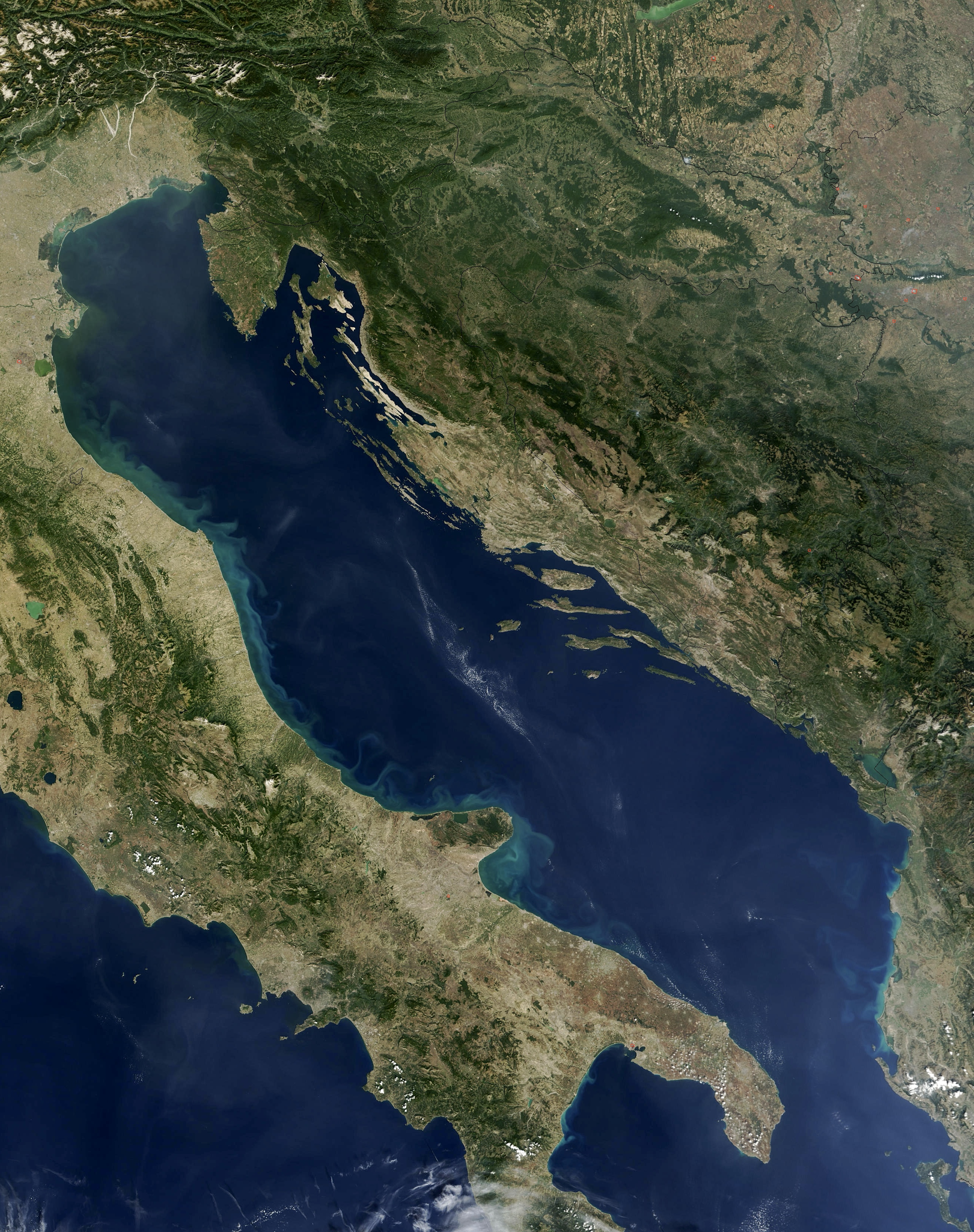
- Satellite image of the Adriatic Sea

- Location within Mediterranean
- Location: Southern Europe
- Coordinates: 43°N 15°E
- Type: Sea
- Etymology: From the ancient city of Adria
- Primary inflows: Adige, Buna, Drin, Krka, Neretva, Po, Soča
- Primary outflows: Ionian Sea
- Catchment area: 235,000 km^{2} (91,000 sq mi)
- Basin countries: Bordering: Albania, Bosnia and Herzegovina, Croatia, Italy, Montenegro and Slovenia; Not bordering: France, Greece, Kosovo, North Macedonia, San Marino, Serbia and Switzerland (drainage basins for inflow rivers)
- Max. length: 800 km (500 mi)
- Max. width: 200 km (120 mi)
- Surface area: 138,600 km^{2} (53,500 sq mi)
- Average depth: 252.5 m (828 ft)
- Max. depth: 1,233 m (4,045 ft)
- Water volume: 35,000 km^{3} (2.8×10^{10} acre⋅ft)
- Residence time: 3.4±0.4 years
- Salinity: 38–39 PSU
- Shore length^{1}: 3,739.1 km (2,323.4 mi)
- Max. temperature: 28 °C (82 °F)
- Min. temperature: 9 °C (48 °F)
- Islands: Over 1300
- Settlements: Ancona, Bari, Dubrovnik, Durrës, Koper, Neum, Pescara, Rijeka, Rimini, Split, Šibenik, Trieste, Venice, Vlorë, Zadar
- ^{1} Shore length is not a well-defined measure.

The Adriatic Sea (/ˌeɪdriˈætɪk/) is a body of water separating the Italian Peninsula from the Balkan Peninsula. The Adriatic is the northernmost arm of the Mediterranean Sea, extending from the Strait of Otranto (where it connects to the Ionian Sea) to the northwest and the Po Valley. The countries with coasts on the Adriatic are Albania, Bosnia and Herzegovina, Croatia, Italy, Montenegro, and Slovenia.

The Adriatic contains more than 1,300 islands, mostly located along its eastern coast. It is divided into three basins, the northern being the shallowest and the southern being the deepest, with a maximum depth of 1,233 metres (4,045 ft). The prevailing currents flow counterclockwise from the Strait of Otranto. Tidal movements in the Adriatic are slight, although larger amplitudes occur occasionally. The Adriatic's salinity is lower than the Mediterranean's because it collects a third of the fresh water flowing into the Mediterranean, acting as a dilution basin. The surface water temperatures generally range from 30 °C (86 °F) in summer to 12 °C (54 °F) in winter, significantly moderating the Adriatic Basin's climate. The Adriatic Sea sits on the Apulian or Adriatic Microplate.

In the Late Oligocene, the Italian Peninsula first formed, separating the Adriatic Basin from the rest of the Mediterranean. The western coast is alluvial or terraced, while the eastern coast is highly indented with pronounced karstification. There are dozens of marine protected areas in the Adriatic, designed to protect the sea's habitats and biodiversity—more than 7,000 species are identified as native to the Adriatic, many of them endemic, rare and threatened ones.

The Adriatic's shores are populated by more than 3.5 million people; the largest cities are Bari, Venice, Trieste and Split. Early settlements on the Adriatic shores were Etruscan, Illyrian, and Greek. By the 2nd century BC, the region was under Rome's control. In the Middle Ages, the sea was controlled, to a varying extent, by a series of states—most notably the Byzantine Empire, the Croatian Kingdom, the Republic of Venice, the Habsburg monarchy and the Ottoman Empire. The Napoleonic Wars resulted in the Austrian Empire gaining control of most of the eastern Adriatic shore and the Po Valley, while the Kingdom of Italy gradually took control of the remaining Italian coast during the 19th century. Following the collapse of Austria-Hungary in 1918, control of the eastern coast passed to Yugoslavia and Albania, which agreed on their maritime boundaries with Italy in 1975 and 1992 respectively. After Yugoslavia's dissolution during the 1990s, its four coastal successor states—Slovenia, Croatia, Bosnia and Herzegovina, and Montenegro—continued to recognise the previous maritime border with Italy, but have disputed the borders between themselves.

Fisheries and tourism are significant sources of income along the Adriatic coast. Maritime transport is also a significant branch of the area's economy—there are 19 seaports in the Adriatic that each handle more than a million tonnes of cargo per year. The largest Adriatic seaport by annual cargo turnover is the Port of Trieste, while the Port of Split is the largest by passengers served per year.

== Name ==
The origins of the name Adriatic are linked to the Etruscan settlement of Adria, which probably derives its name from Illyrian adur 'water, sea'. In classical antiquity, the sea was known as Mare Adriaticum (Mare Hadriaticum, also sometimes simplified to Adria) or, less frequently, as Mare Superum '[the] upper sea'. The two terms were not synonymous, however. Mare Adriaticum generally corresponds to the Adriatic Sea's extent, spanning from the Gulf of Venice to the Strait of Otranto. That boundary became more consistently defined by Roman authors—early Greek sources place the boundary between the Adriatic and Ionian seas at various places ranging from adjacent to the Gulf of Venice to the southern tip of the Peloponnese, eastern shores of Sicily and western shores of Crete. Mare Superum on the other hand normally encompassed both the modern Adriatic Sea and the sea off the Apennine peninsula's southern coast, as far as the Strait of Sicily. Another name used in the period was Mare Dalmaticum, applied to waters off the coast of Dalmatia or Illyricum. During the early modern period, the entire sea was also known as the Gulf of Venice (Italian: golfo di Venezia), although that name is now informally applied only to the northern area of the sea, from Maestra Point in the Po Delta to Cape Kamenjak on the Istrian Peninsula.

The names for the sea in the languages of the surrounding countries include Albanian: Deti Adriatik; Emilian: Mèr Adriatic; Friulian: Mâr Adriatic; Greek: Αδριατική θάλασσα, romanized: Adriatikí thálassa; Istro Romanian: Marea Adriatică; Italian: Mare Adriatico; Serbo-Croatian: Jadransko more, Јадранско море; Slovene: Jadransko morje; Venetian: Mar Adriàtico. In Serbo-Croatian and Slovene, the sea is often referred to as simply Jadran.

== Geography ==
The Adriatic Sea is a semi-enclosed sea, bordered in the southwest by the Apennine or Italian Peninsula, in the northwest by the Italian regions of Veneto and Friuli-Venezia Giulia, and in the northeast by Slovenia, Croatia, Bosnia and Herzegovina, Montenegro, and Albania—the Balkan Peninsula. In the southeast, the Adriatic Sea connects to the Ionian Sea at the 72-kilometre (45 mi) wide Strait of Otranto. The International Hydrographic Organization (IHO) defines the boundary between the Adriatic and the Ionian seas as a line running from the Butrinto River's mouth (latitude 39°44'N) in Albania to the Karagol Cape in Corfu, through this island to the Kephali Cape (these two capes are in latitude 39°45'N), and on to the Santa Maria di Leuca Cape (latitude 39°48'N). It extends 800 kilometres (500 mi) from the northwest to the southeast and is 200 kilometres (120 mi) wide. It covers 138,600 square kilometres (53,500 sq mi) and has a volume of 35,000 cubic kilometres (8,400 cu mi). The Adriatic extends northwest from 40° to 45°47' north, representing the Mediterranean's northernmost portion. The sea is geographically divided into the Northern Adriatic, Central (or Middle) Adriatic, and Southern Adriatic.

The Adriatic Sea drainage basin encompasses 235,000 square kilometres (91,000 sq mi), yielding a land–sea ratio of 1.8. The drainage basin's mean elevation is 782 metres (2,566 ft) above sea level, with a mean slope of 12.1°. Major rivers discharging into the Adriatic include the Po, Soča, Krka, Neretva, Drin, Buna, and Vjosë. In the late 19th century, Austria-Hungary established a geodetic network with an elevation benchmark using the average Adriatic Sea level at the Sartorio pier in Trieste, Italy. The benchmark was subsequently retained by Austria, adopted by Yugoslavia, and retained by the states that emerged after its dissolution. In 2016, Slovenia adopted a new elevation benchmark referring to the upgraded tide gauge station in the coastal town of Koper.

The Alps, which also have a large meteorological impact on the Mediterranean, touch the Adriatic in the area around Trieste towards Duino and Barcola.

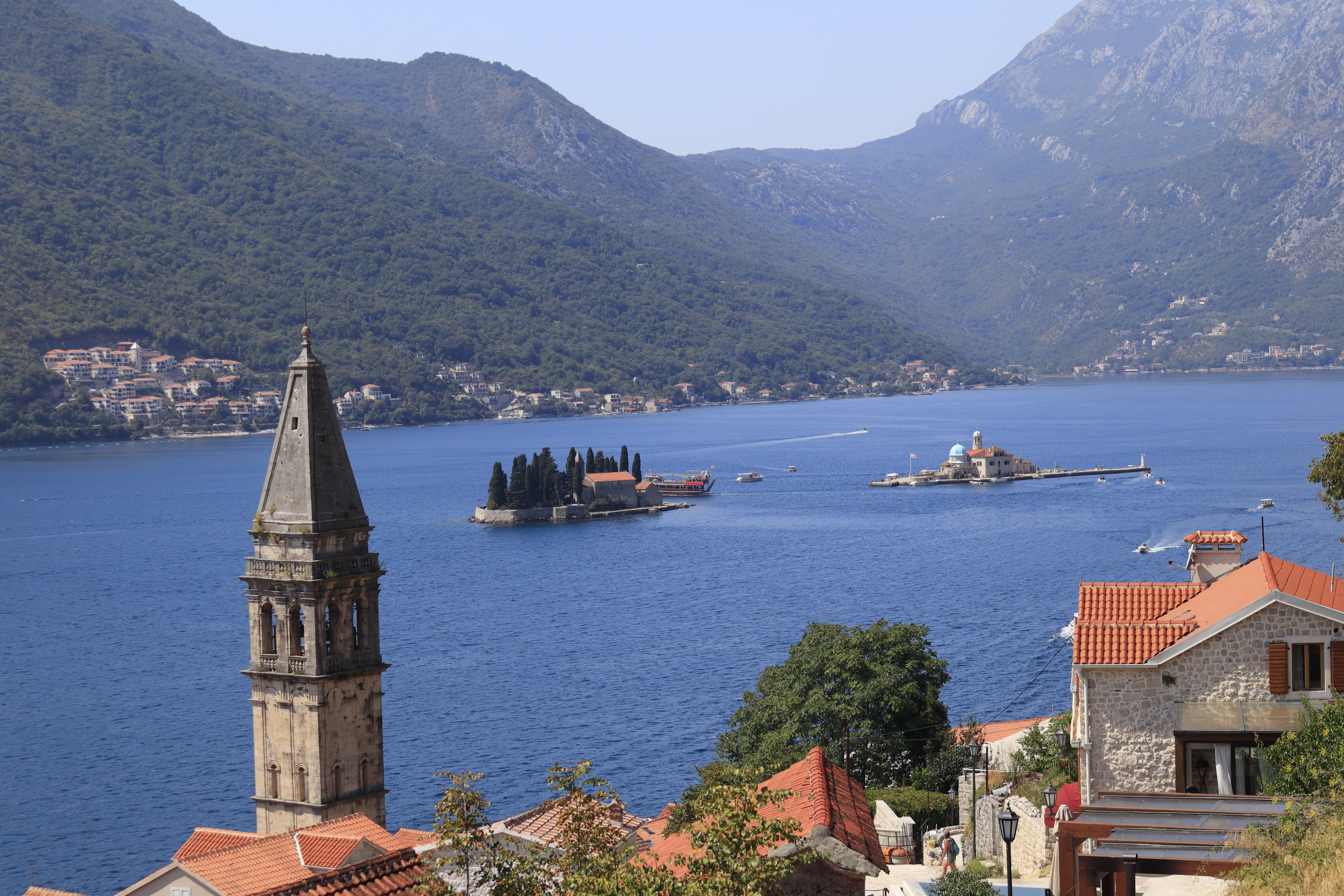
Bay of Kotor, a ria in the Southern Adriatic

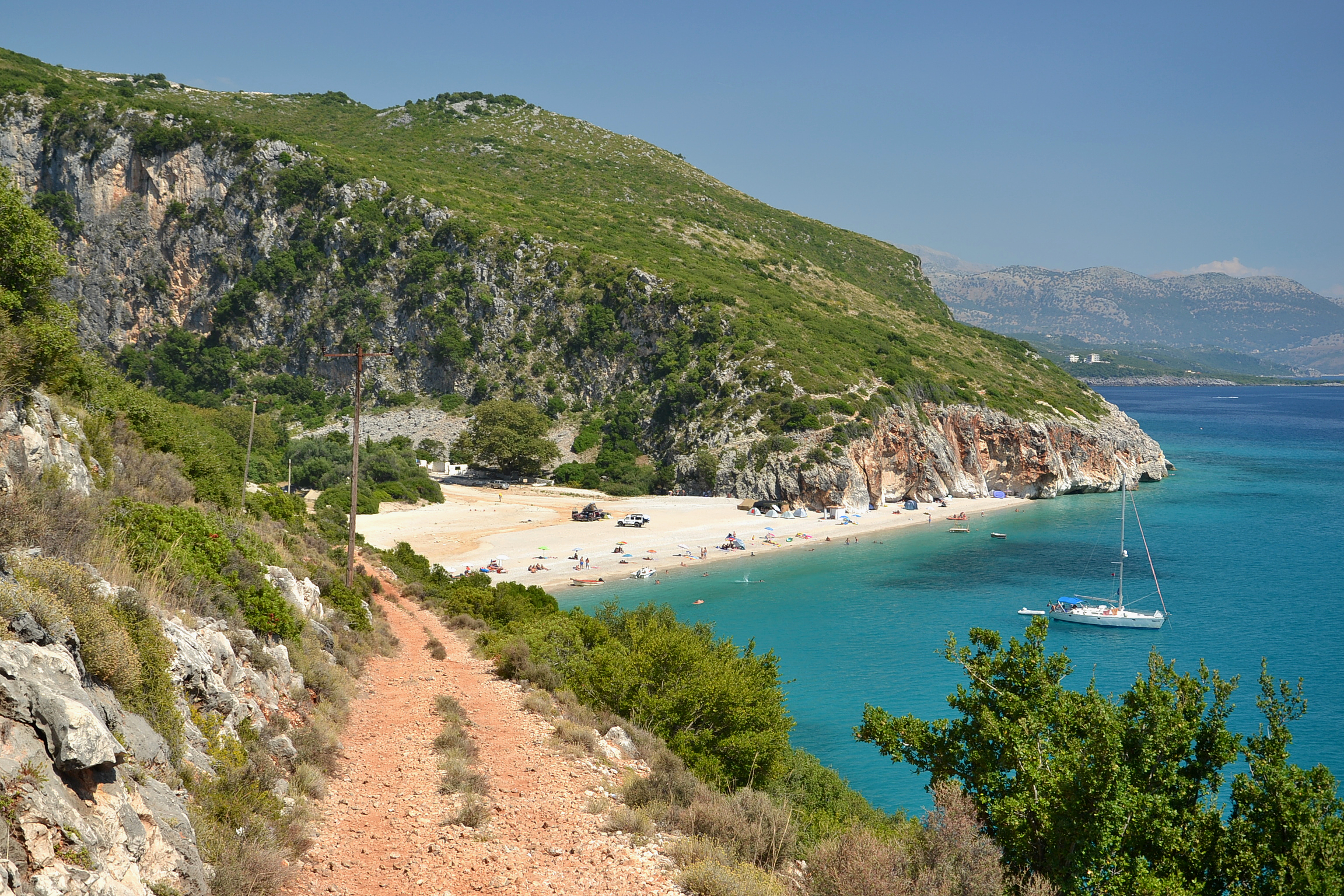
Gjipe Canyon in southern Albania, where the Adriatic Sea meets the Ionian Sea

Length in kilometres of Adriatic coastlines
Country	Mainland	Islands	Total	Coastal front^{a}
Croatia	1,777.3	4,058	5,835.3	526
Italy	1,249	23^{b}	1,272	926
Albania	396	10	406	265
Montenegro	249	11	260	92
Slovenia	46.6	0	46.6	17
Bosnia and Herzegovina	21.2	0	21.2	10.5
Total	3,739.1	4,102	7,841.1	1,836.5
Notes: ^{a} The distance between the extreme points of each state's coastline, ^{b} Not including islands in coastal lagoons
1.000 mi = 1.609 km; 1.000 km = 0.621 mi

The Adriatic Sea contains more than 1,300 islands and islets, most along the Adriatic's eastern coast—especially in Croatia, with 1,246 counted. The number includes islands, islets, and rocks of all sizes, including ones emerging at ebb tide only. The Croatian islands include the largest—Cres and Krk, each covering about the same area of 405.78 square kilometres (156.67 sq mi)—and the tallest—Brač, whose peak reaches 780 metres (2,560 ft) above sea level. The islands of Cres and the adjacent Lošinj are separated only by a narrow navigable canal dug in the time of classical antiquity; the original single island was known to the Greeks as Apsyrtides. The Croatian islands include 47 permanently inhabited ones, the most populous among them being Krk, Korčula and Brač. The islands along the Adriatic's western (Italian) coast are smaller and less numerous than those along the opposite coast; the best-known ones are the 117 islands on which the city of Venice is built. The northern shore of the Greek island of Corfu also lies in the Adriatic Sea as defined by the IHO. The IHO boundary places the Diapontia Islands (northwest of Corfu) in the Adriatic Sea.

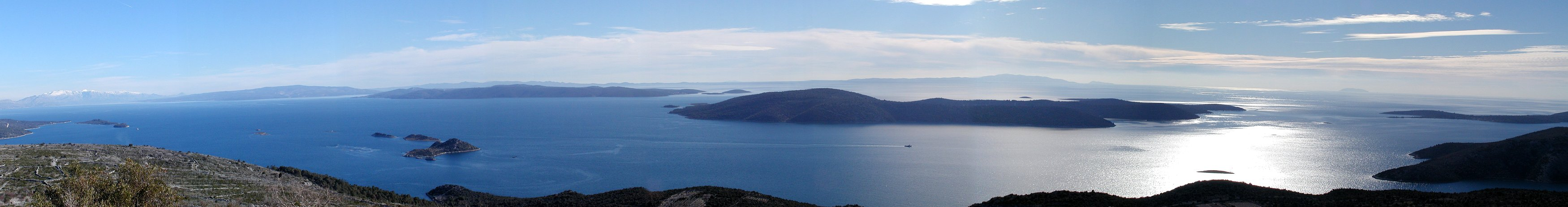
Adriatic islands off Croatia's coast

=== Exclusive economic zone ===
Exclusive economic zones in Adriatic Sea:

Number	Country	Area (Km^{2})
1	Italy	63,600
2	Croatia	55,961
3	Albania	11,105
4	Montenegro	7,460
5	Slovenia	192
6	Bosnia and Herzegovina	50
Total	Adriatic Sea	138,600

=== Bathymetry ===
Depth of the Adriatic Sea

The Adriatic Sea's average depth is 259.5 metres (851 ft), and its maximum depth is 1,233 metres (4,045 ft); however, the North Adriatic basin rarely exceeds a depth of 100 metres (330 ft). The North Adriatic basin, extending between Venice and Trieste towards a line connecting Ancona and Zadar, is only 15 metres (49 ft) deep at its northwestern end; it gradually deepens towards the southeast. It is the largest Mediterranean shelf and is simultaneously a dilution basin and a site of bottom water formation. The Middle Adriatic basin is south of the Ancona–Zadar line, with the 270-metre (890 ft) deep Middle Adriatic Pit (also called the Pomo Depression or the Jabuka Pit). The 170-metre (560 ft) deep Palagruža Sill is south of the Middle Adriatic Pit, separating it from the 1,200-metre (3,900 ft) deep South Adriatic Pit and the Middle Adriatic basin from the South Adriatic Basin. Further on to the south, the sea floor rises to 780 metres (2,560 ft) to form the Otranto Sill at the boundary to the Ionian Sea. The South Adriatic Basin is similar in many respects to the Northern Ionian Sea, to which it is connected. Transversely, the Adriatic Sea is also asymmetric: the Apennine peninsular coast is relatively smooth with very few islands and the Mount Conero and Gargano promontories as the only significant protrusions into the sea; in contrast, the Balkan peninsular coast is rugged with numerous islands, especially in Croatia. The coast's ruggedness is exacerbated by the Dinaric Alps' proximity to the coast, in contrast to the opposite (Italian) coast where the Apennine Mountains are further away from the shoreline.

=== Hydrology ===
Schematic layout of Adriatic Sea currents surface currents benthic currents

The coastal water dynamics are determined by the asymmetric coasts and the inflow of the Mediterranean seawater through the Straits of Otranto and further on along the eastern coast. The smooth Italian coast (with very few protrusions and no major islands) allows the Western Adriatic Current, which is composed of the relatively freshwater mass on the surface and the cold and dense water mass at the bottom, to flow smoothly. The coastal currents on the opposite shore are far more complex owing to the jagged shoreline, several large islands and the proximity of the Dinaric Alps to the shore. The last produces significant temperature variations between the sea and the hinterland, which leads to the creation of local jets. The tidal movement is normally slight, usually remaining below 30 centimetres (12 in). The amphidromic point is at the mid-width east of Ancona.

The normal tide levels are known to increase significantly in a conducive environment, leading to coastal flooding; this phenomenon is most famously known in Italy—especially Venice—as acqua alta. Such tides can exceed normal levels by more than 140 centimetres (55 in), with the highest tide level of 194 centimetres (76 in) observed on 4 November 1966. Such flooding is caused by a combination of factors, including the alignment of the Sun and Moon, meteorological factors such as sirocco related storm surges, and the basin's geometric shape (which amplifies or reduces the astronomical component). Moreover, the Adriatic's long and narrow rectangular shape is the source of an oscillating water motion (French: seiche) along the basin's minor axis. Finally, Venice is increasingly vulnerable to flooding due to coastal area soil subsidence. Such unusually high tides resulting in flooding have also been observed elsewhere in the Adriatic Sea, and have been recorded in recent years in the towns of Koper, Zadar and Šibenik as well.

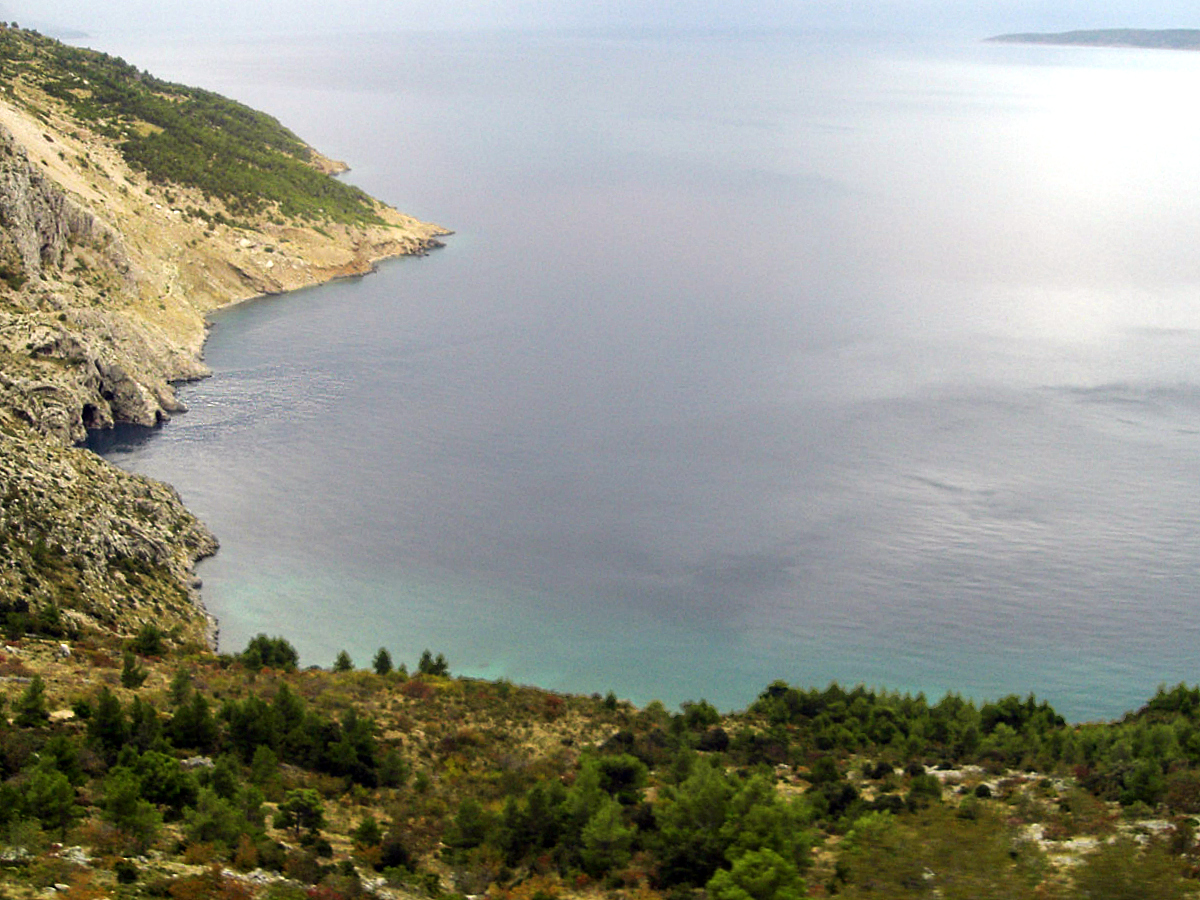
A submarine spring near Omiš, observed through sea surface rippling

It is estimated that the Adriatic's entire volume is exchanged through the Strait of Otranto in 3.4±0.4 years, a comparatively short period. (For instance, approximately 500 years are necessary to exchange all the Black Sea's water.) This short period is particularly important as the rivers flowing into the Adriatic discharge up to 5,700 cubic metres per second (200,000 cu ft/s). This rate of discharge amounts to 0.5% of the total Adriatic Sea volume, or a 1.3-metre (4 ft 3 in) layer of water each year. The greatest portion of the discharge from any single river comes from the Po (28%), with an average discharge from it alone of 1,569 cubic metres per second (55,400 cu ft/s). In terms of the annual total discharge into the entire Mediterranean Sea, the Po is ranked second, followed by the Neretva and Drin, which rank as third and fourth. Another significant contributor of freshwater to the Adriatic is the submarine groundwater discharge through submarine springs (Croatian: vrulja); it is estimated to comprise 29% of the total water flux into the Adriatic. The submarine springs include thermal springs, discovered offshore near the town of Izola. The thermal spring water is rich with hydrogen sulfide, has a temperature of 22 to 29.6 °C (71.6 to 85.3 °F), and has enabled the development of specific ecosystems. The inflow of freshwater, representing a third of the freshwater volume flowing into the Mediterranean, makes the Adriatic a dilution basin for the Mediterranean Sea. The Middle and South Adriatic Gyres (SAG), are significant cyclonic circulation features, with the former being intermittent and the latter permanent. The SAG measures 150 kilometres (93 miles) in diameter. It contributes to the flow of bottom water from the Adriatic to the Levantine Basin through the Ionian Sea. Through that process, the Adriatic Sea produces most of the East Mediterranean deep water.

=== Temperature and salinity ===
The Adriatic's surface temperature usually ranges from 22 to 30 °C (72 to 86 °F) in the summer, or 12 to 14 °C (54 to 57 °F) in the winter, except along the western Adriatic coast's northern part, where it drops to 9 °C (48 °F) in the winter. The distinct seasonal temperature variations, with a longitudinal gradient in the Northern and transversal gradient in the Middle and Southern Adriatic, are attributed to the continental characteristics of the Adriatic Sea: it is shallower and closer to land than are oceans. During particularly cold winters, sea ice may appear in the Adriatic's shallow coastal areas, especially in the Venetian Lagoon but also in isolated shallows as far south as Tisno (south of Zadar). The Southern Adriatic is about 8 to 10 °C (14 to 18 °F) warmer during the winter than the more northerly regions. The Adriatic's salinity variation over the year is likewise distinct: it ranges between 38 and 39 PSUs, somewhat higher than the range of 32 to 37 PSUs for the open ocean. The southern Adriatic is subjected to saltier water from the Levantine Basin.

=== Climate ===
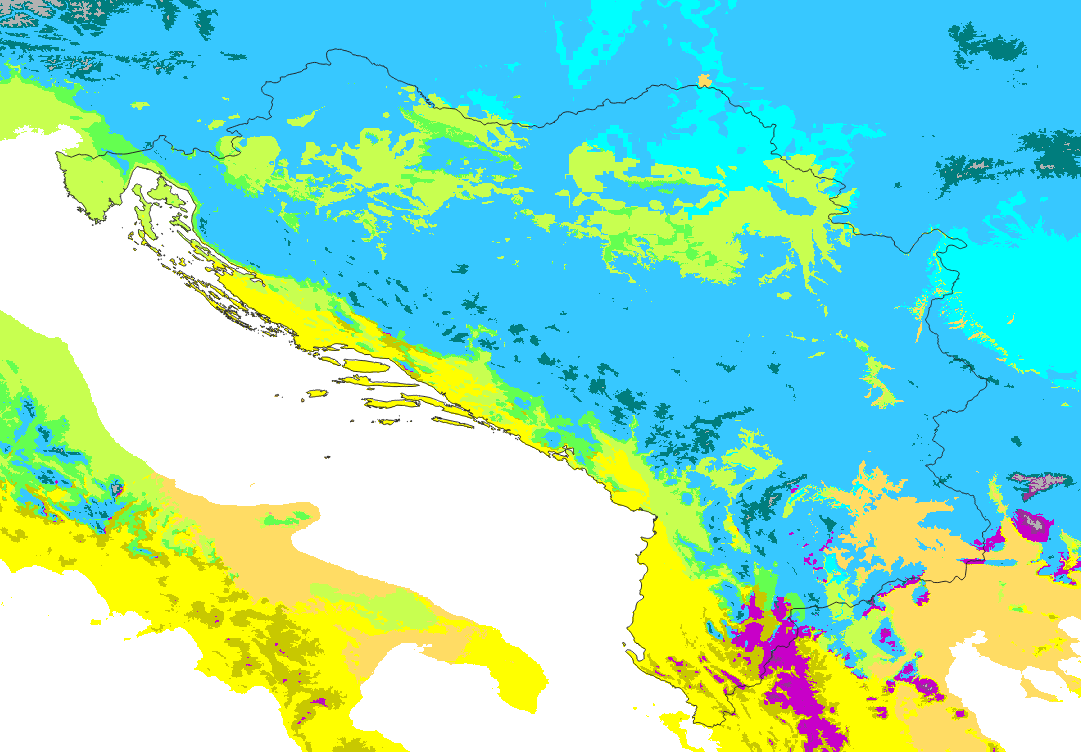
As seen from the map, most of the landmass surrounding the Adriatic sea is classified as Cfa, with the southern region (near the Ionian Sea) being Csa.

According to the Köppen climate classification, the upper half of the Adriatic is classified as humid subtropical climate (Cfa), with wetter summers and colder and drier winters, and the southern Adriatic are classified as hot-summer Mediterranean climate (Csa). The air temperature can fluctuate by about 20 °C (36 °F) during a season.

The predominant winter winds are the bora and sirocco (called jugo along the eastern coast). The bora is significantly conditioned by wind gaps in the Dinaric Alps bringing cold and dry continental air; it reaches peak speeds in the areas of Trieste, Senj, and Split, with gusts of up to 180 kilometres per hour (97 kn; 110 mph). The sirocco brings humid and warm air, often carrying Saharan sand causing rain dust.

Climate characteristics of some major Adriatic cities
City	Mean temperature (daily high)				Mean total rainfall					
City	January		July		January			July		
City	°C	°F	°C	°F	mm	in	days	mm	in	days
Bari	12.1	53.8	28.4	83.1	50.8	2.00	7.3	27.0	1.06	2.6
Dubrovnik	12.2	54.0	28.3	82.9	95.2	3.75	11.2	24.1	0.95	4.4
Rijeka	8.7	47.7	27.7	81.9	134.9	5.31	11.0	82.0	3.23	9.1
Split	10.2	50.4	29.8	85.6	77.9	3.07	11.1	27.6	1.09	5.6
Venice	5.8	42.4	27.5	81.5	58.1	2.29	6.7	63.1	2.48	5.7
Source: World Meteorological Organization

=== Population ===
Most populous urban areas on the Adriatic coast
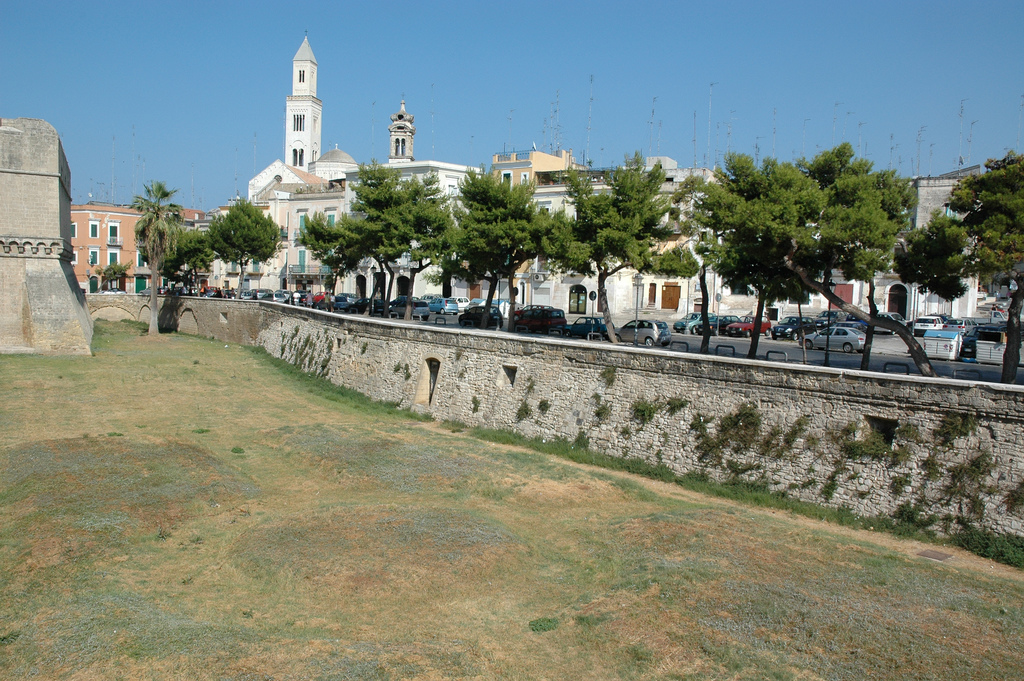
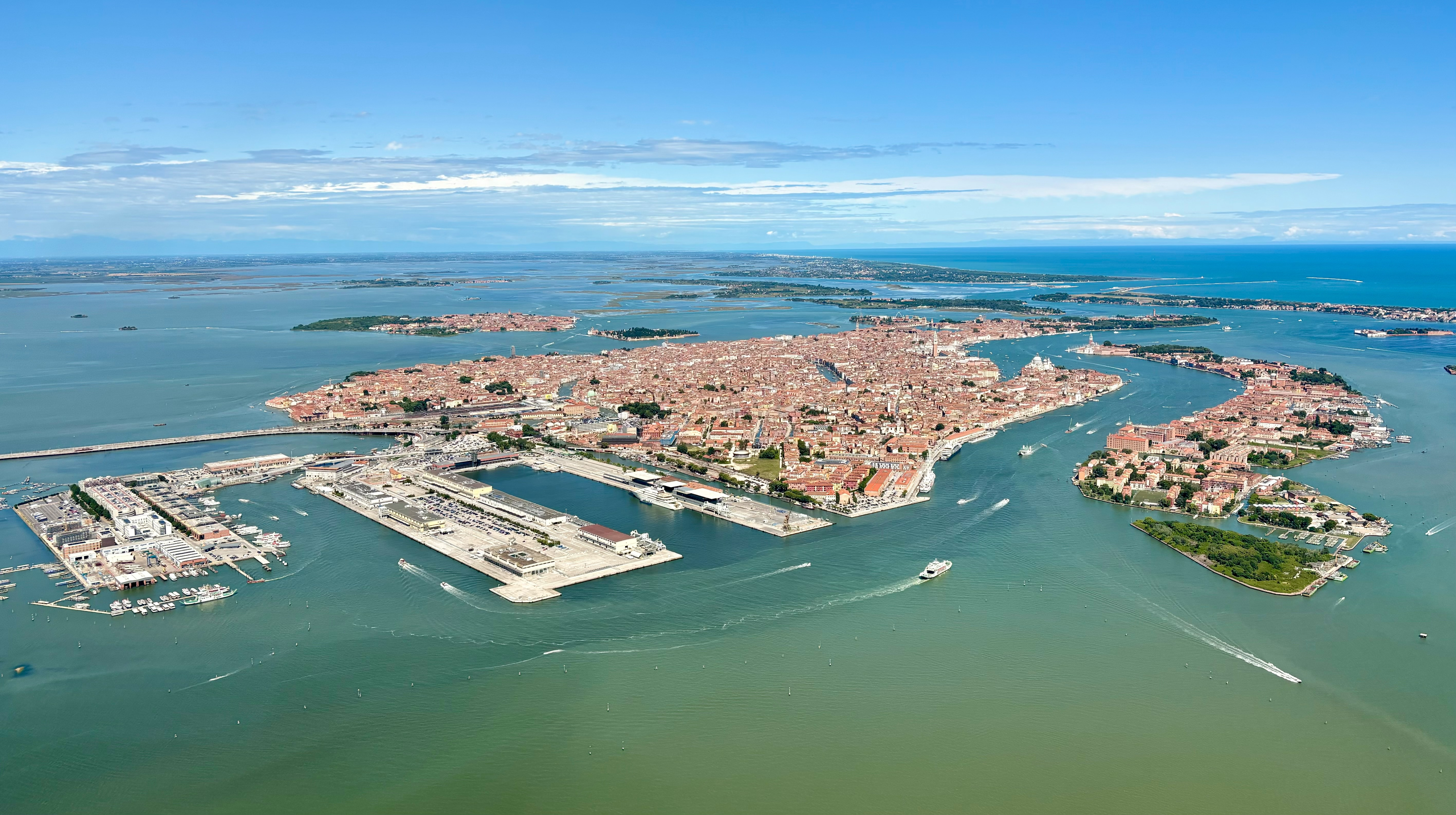
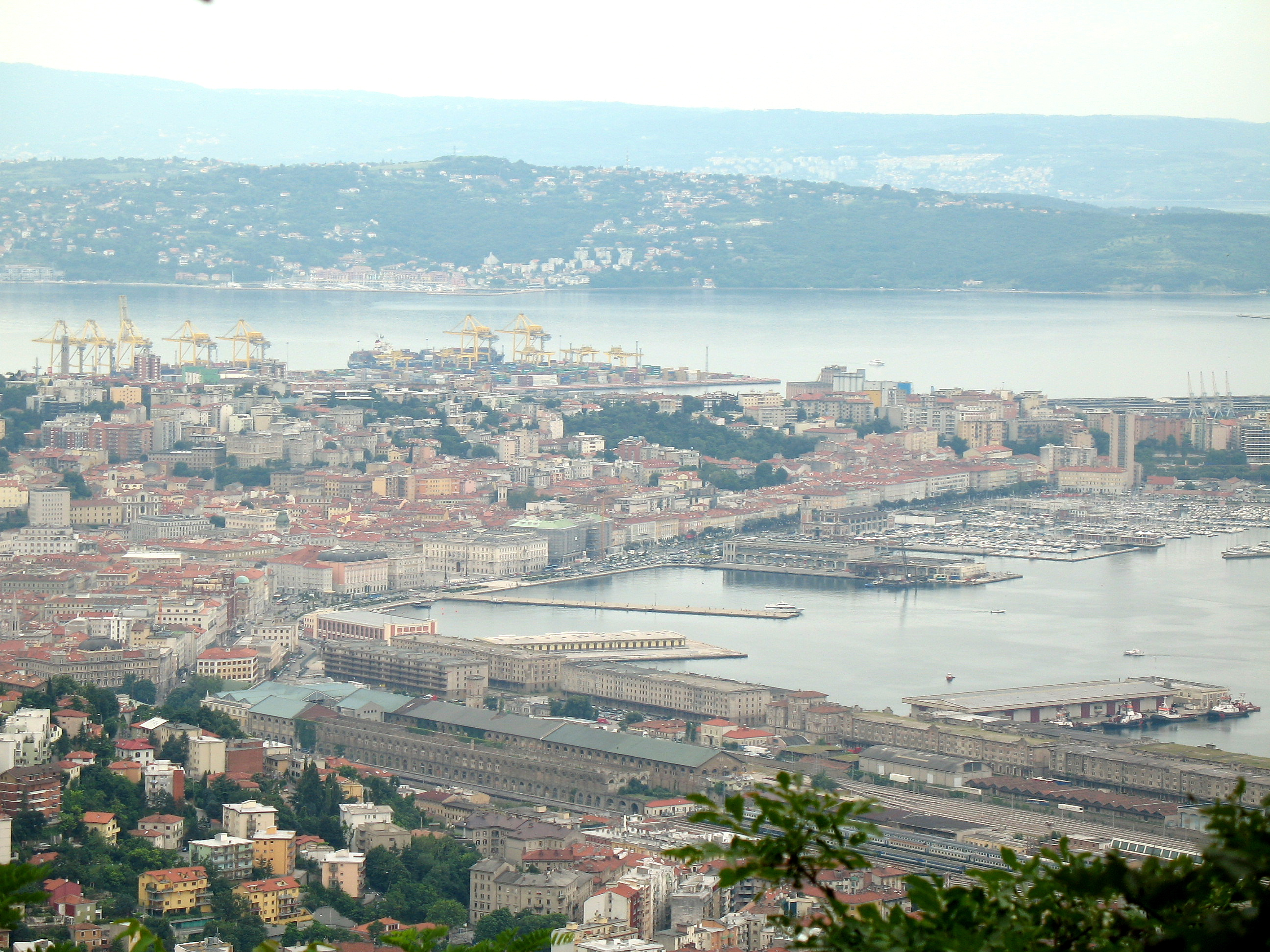
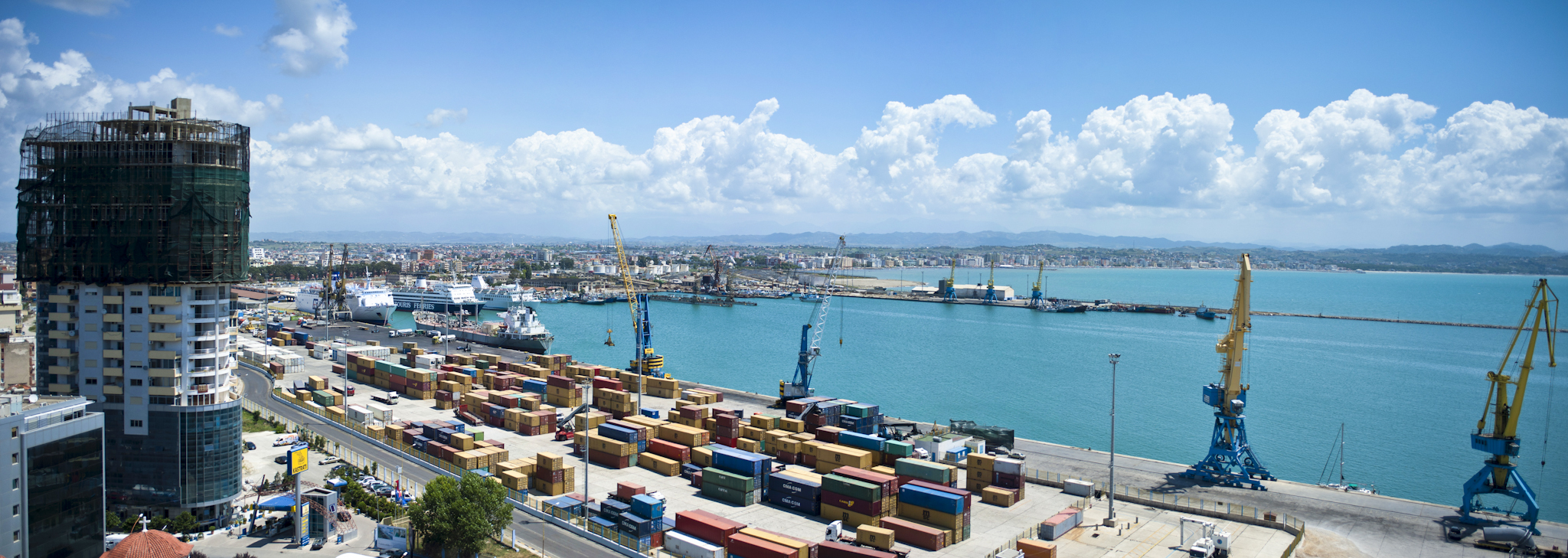
Bari Venice	Rank	City	Country	Region/County	Population (urban)	Trieste Durrës
Bari Venice	1	Bari	Italy	Apulia	320,475	Trieste Durrës
Bari Venice	2	Venice	Italy	Veneto	270,884	Trieste Durrës
Bari Venice	3	Trieste	Italy	Friuli-Venezia Giulia	205,535	Trieste Durrës
Bari Venice	4	Durrës	Albania	Durrës	199,073	Trieste Durrës
Bari Venice	5	Split	Croatia	Split-Dalmatia	178,102	Trieste Durrës
Bari Venice	6	Rimini	Italy	Emilia-Romagna	150,009	Trieste Durrës
Bari Venice	7	Rijeka	Croatia	Primorje-Gorski Kotar	128,384	Trieste Durrës
Bari Venice	8	Pescara	Italy	Abruzzo	123,103	Trieste Durrës
Bari Venice	9	Vlorë	Albania	Vlorë	117,850	Trieste Durrës
Bari Venice	10	Ancona	Italy	Marche	101,210	Trieste Durrës
Bari Venice	Sources: 2011 Croatian census, Italian National Institute of Statistics (2011), 2011 Albanian Census					Trieste Durrës

On the Adriatic Sea's coasts and islands, there are numerous small settlements and a number of larger cities. Among the largest are (counterclockwise) Trieste, Venice, Rimini, Ancona, Pescara and Bari in Italy; Vlorë and Durrës in Albania; Split, Zadar and Rijeka in Croatia; Koper in Slovenia. In total, more than 3.5 million people live on the Adriatic coasts. There are also some larger cities that are located very near the coast, such as the Italian cities of Ravenna and Lecce.

== Coastal management ==
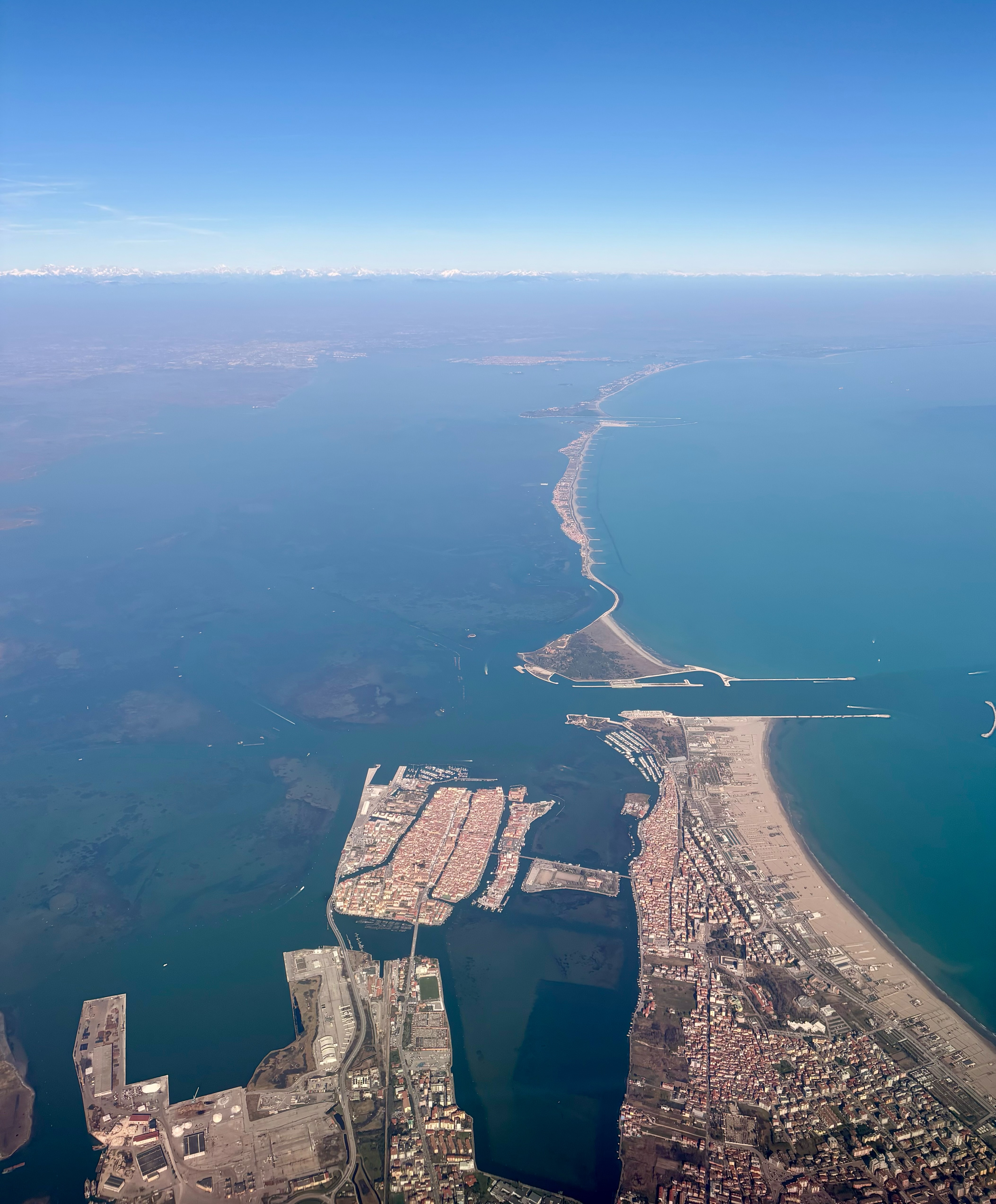
Venetian Lagoon and the barrier islands. The MOSE project is a system consisting of rows of mobile gates that can be raised to seal off the Venetian Lagoon from the Adriatic Sea during high tides.

Venice, which was originally built on islands off the coast, is most at risk due to subsidence, but the threat is present in the Po delta as well. The causes are a decrease in sedimentation rate due to loss of sediment behind dams, the deliberate excavation of sand for industrial purposes, agricultural use of water, and removal of ground water.

The sinking of Venice slowed after artesian wells were banned in the 1960s, but the city remains threatened by the acqua alta floods. Recent studies have suggested that the city is no longer sinking, but a state of alert remains in place. In May 2003, then-Prime Minister Silvio Berlusconi inaugurated the MOSE project (Italian: Modulo Sperimentale Elettromeccanico), an experimental model for evaluating the performance of inflatable gates. The project proposes laying a series of 79 inflatable pontoons across the sea bed at the three entrances to the Venetian Lagoon. When tides are predicted to rise above 110 centimetres (43 in), the pontoons will be filled with air and block the incoming water from the Adriatic Sea. This engineering work was due to be completed by 2014, but as of November 2020 is expected to be completed in 2021. Implemented for the first time on 3 October 2020, the barriers are made to seal off three inlets that lead to the Venetian Lagoon and counteract floods of up to ten feet; in addition to protecting the city from flooding, the barrier system is also intended to stabilize Venice's water levels so as to minimize erosion of the brick walls and, subsequently, the foundations of various buildings in the city. However, concern has been raised regarding the frequency of its use—while only necessary a few days a year, the worst-case sea level rise scenario between 2050 and 2100 would prompt deployment up to 187 days a year, essentially cutting off the Venetian Lagoon from the Adriatic Sea. Among other possible adverse effects, this can be expected to lower the lagoon's oxygen levels and trap pollution inside of the city.

== Geology ==
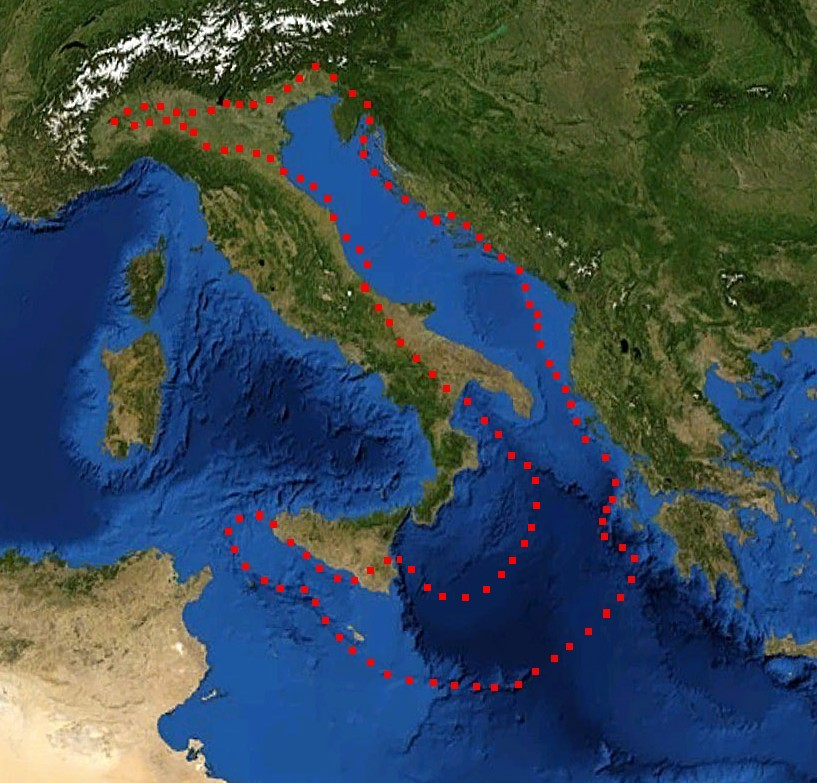
Adriatic Microplate boundaries

Geophysical and geological information indicate that the Adriatic Sea and the Po Valley are associated with a tectonic microplate—identified as the Apulian or Adriatic Plate—that separated from the African Plate during the Mesozoic era. This separation began in the Middle and Late Triassic, when limestone began to be deposited in the area. Between the Norian and Late Cretaceous, the Adriatic and Apulia Carbonate Platforms formed as a thick series of carbonate sediments (dolomites and limestones), up to 8,000 metres (26,000 ft) deep. Remnants of the former are found in the Adriatic Sea, as well as in the southern Alps and the Dinaric Alps, and remnants of the latter are seen as the Gargano Promontory and the Maiella mountain. In the Eocene and early Oligocene, the plate moved north and north-east, contributing to the Alpine orogeny (along with the African and Eurasian Plates' movements) via the tectonic uplift of the Dinarides and Alps. In the Late Oligocene, the motion was reversed and the Apennine Mountains' orogeny took place. An unbroken zone of increased seismic activity borders the Adriatic Sea, with a belt of thrust faults generally oriented in the northeast–southwest direction on the east coast and the northeast–southwest normal faults in the Apennines, indicating an Adriatic counterclockwise rotation.

An active 200-kilometre (120 mi) fault has been identified to the northwest of Dubrovnik, adding to the Dalmatian islands as the Eurasian Plate slides over the Adriatic microplate. Furthermore, the fault causes the Apennine peninsula's southern tip to move towards the opposite shore by about 0.4 centimetres (0.16 in) per year. If this movement continues, the seafloor will be completely consumed and the Adriatic Sea closed off in 50–70 million years. In the Northern Adriatic, the coast of the Gulf of Trieste and western Istria is gradually subsiding, having sunk about 1.5 metres (4 ft 11 in) in the past two thousand years. In the Middle Adriatic Basin, there is evidence of Permian volcanism in the area of Komiža on the island of Vis and the volcanic islands of Jabuka and Brusnik. Earthquakes have been observed in the region since the earliest historical records. A recent strong earthquake in the region was the 1979 Montenegro earthquake, measuring 7.0 on the Richter scale. Historical earthquakes in the area include the 1627 Gargano peninsula and the 1667 Dubrovnik earthquakes, both followed by strong tsunamis. In the last 600 years, fifteen tsunamis have occurred in the Adriatic Sea.

=== Seafloor sediment ===
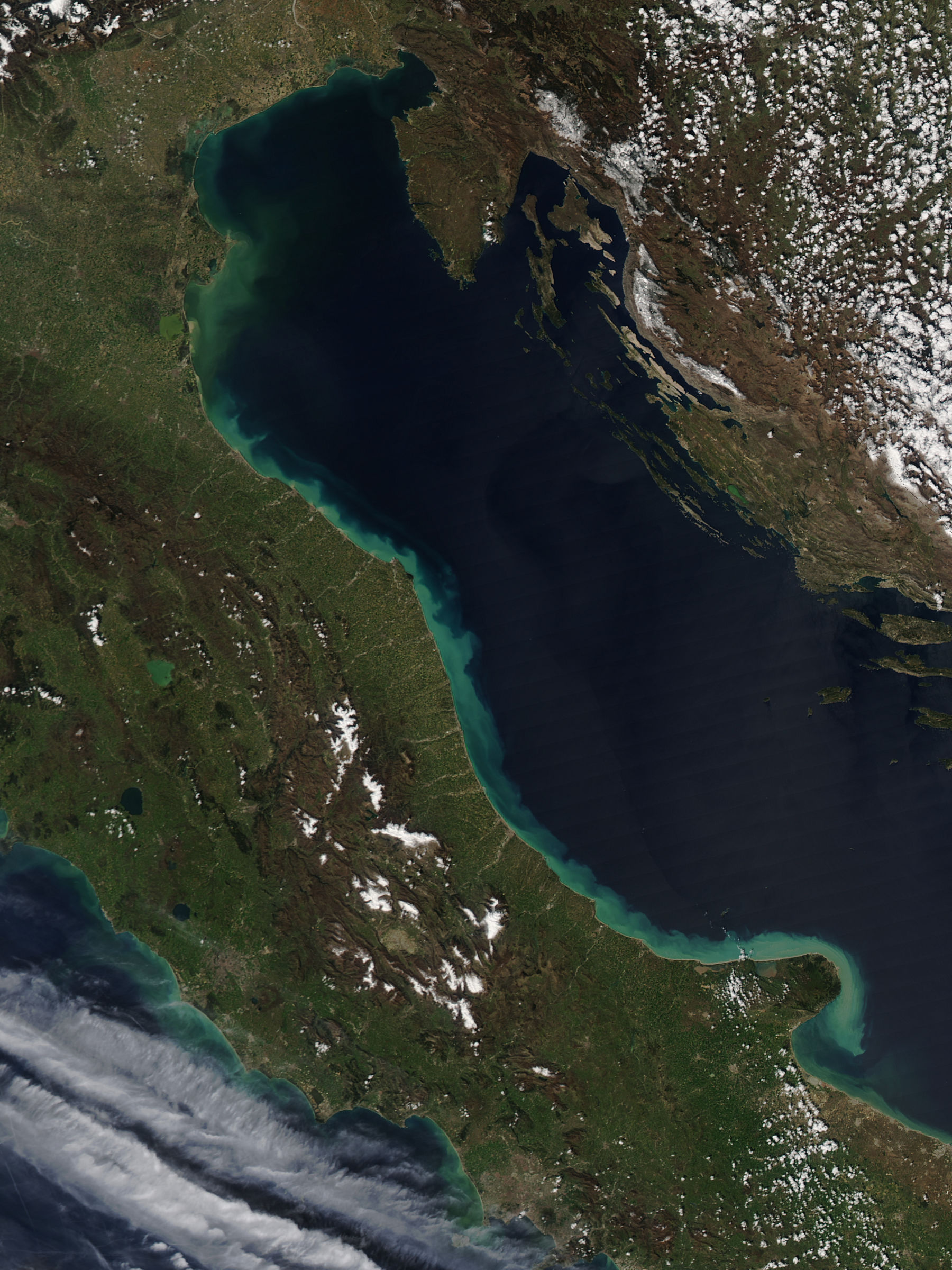
Sediment billowing out from Italy's shore into the Adriatic

All types of seafloor sediments are found in the Adriatic Sea. The Northern Adriatic's comparatively shallow seabed is characterised by relict sand (from times when the water level was lower and the area was a sandy beach), while a muddy bed is typical at depths below 100 metres (330 ft). There are five geomorphological units in the Adriatic: the Northern Adriatic (up to 100 metres (330 ft) deep); the North Adriatic islands area protected against sediments filling it in by outer islands (pre-Holocene karst relief); the Middle Adriatic islands area (large Dalmatian islands); the Middle Adriatic (characterized by the Middle Adriatic Depression); and the Southern Adriatic consisting of a coastal shelf and the Southern Adriatic Depression. Sediments deposited in the Adriatic Sea today generally come from the northwest coast, being carried by the Po, Reno, Adige, Brenta, Tagliamento, Piave and Soča rivers. The volume of sediments carried from the eastern shore by the Rječina, Zrmanja, Krka, Cetina, Ombla, Dragonja, Mirna, Raša and Neretva rivers is negligible, because these sediments are mostly deposited at the river mouths. The Adriatic's western shores are largely either alluvial or terraced, whereas the eastern shores are predominantly rocky, except for the southernmost part of the shore located in Albania that consists of sandy coves and rocky capes.

=== Coasts ===
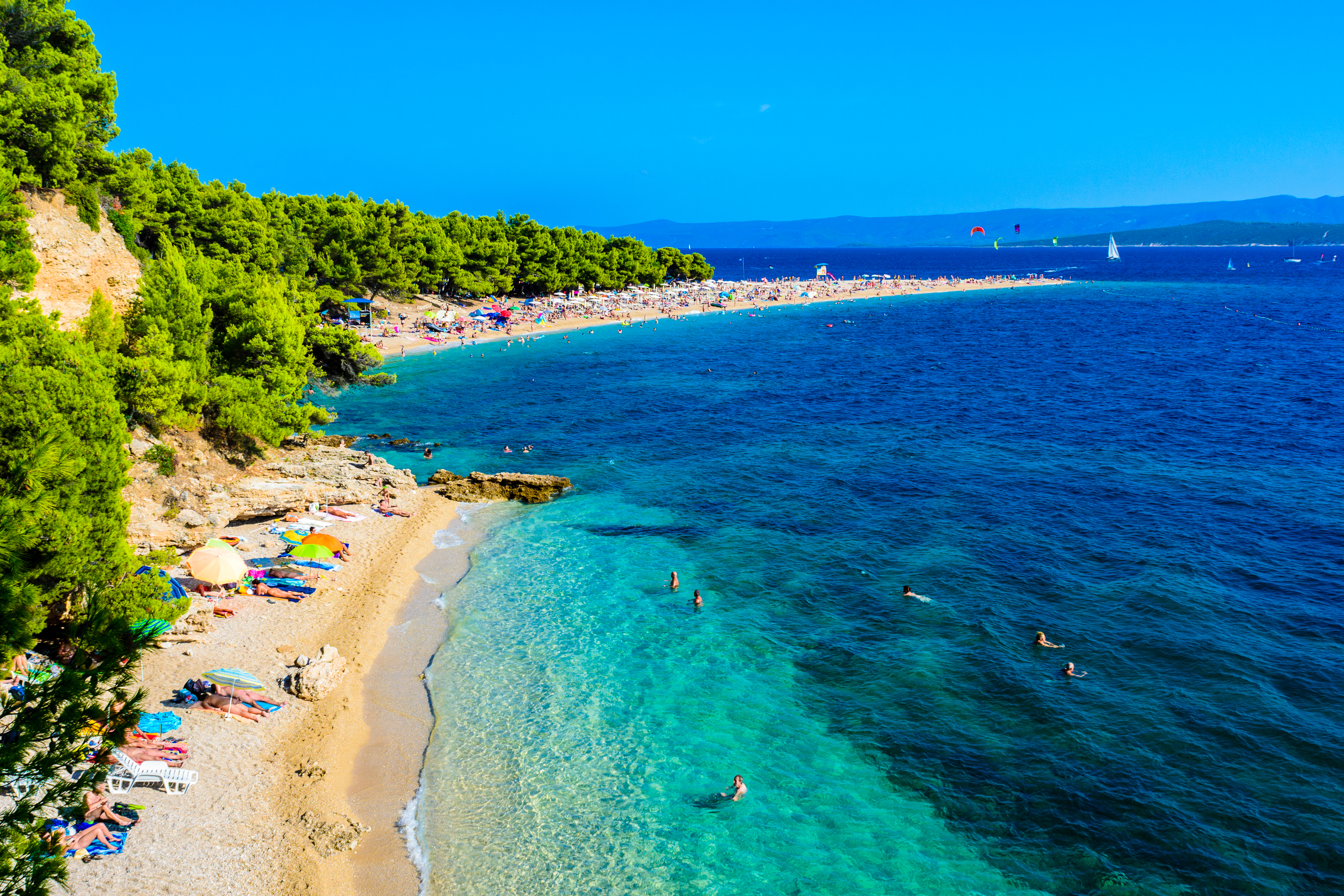
Pebble beach at Brač island, in the Adriatic Sea within Croatia

The eastern Adriatic shore's Croatian part is the most indented Mediterranean coastline. Most of the eastern coast is characterised by a karst topography, developed from the Adriatic Carbonate Platform's exposure to weathering. Karstification there largely began after the Dinarides' final uplift in the Oligocene and the Miocene, when carbonate deposits were exposed to atmospheric effects; this extended to the level of 120 metres (390 ft) below the present sea level, exposed during the Last Glacial Maximum. It is estimated that some karst formations are from earlier sea level drops, most notably the Messinian salinity crisis. Similarly, karst developed in Apulia from the Apulian Carbonate Platform.

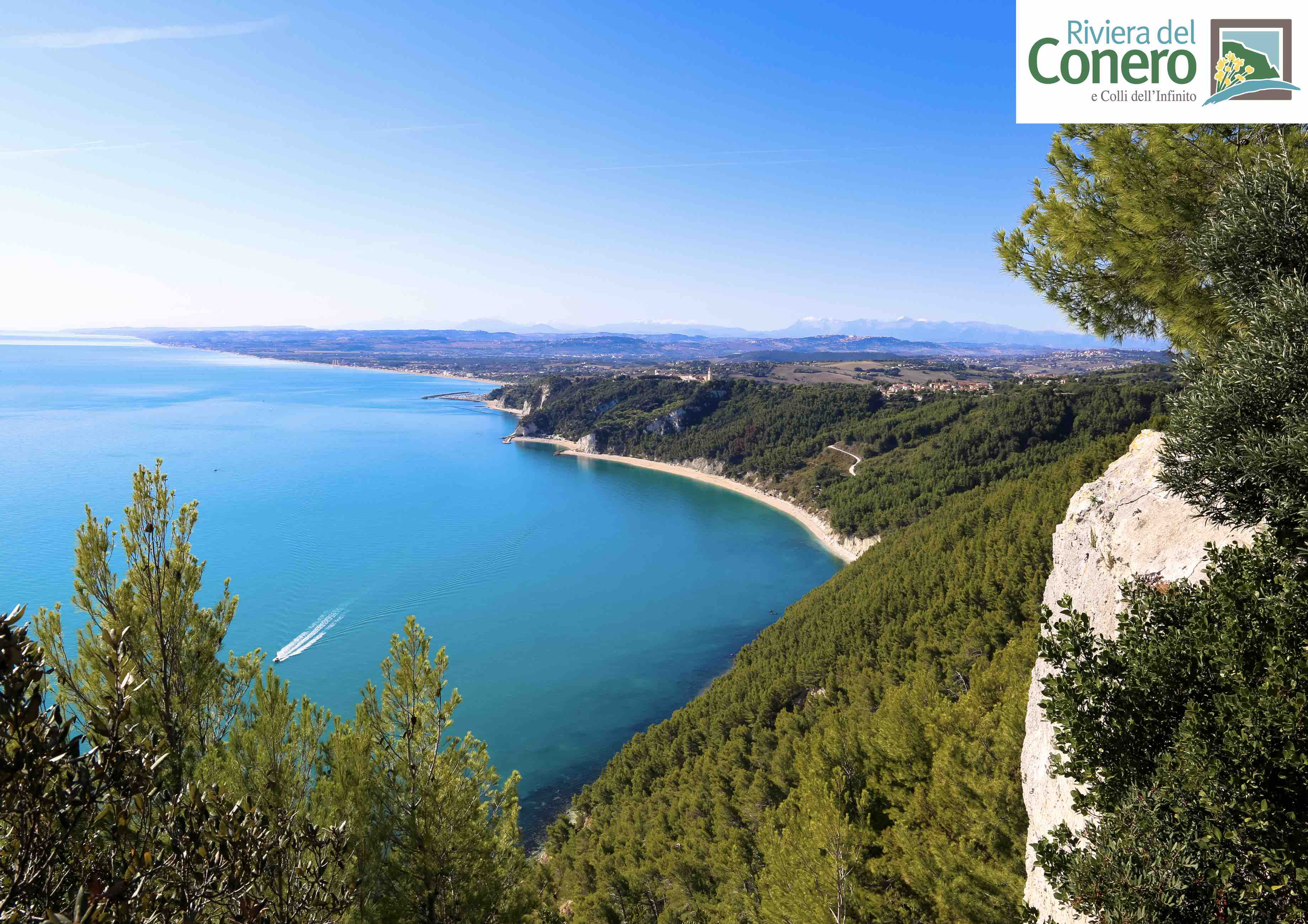
Coast of Mount Conero in Italy

The largest part of the eastern coast consists of carbonate rocks, while flysch (a particular type of sedimentary rock) is significantly represented in the Gulf of Trieste coast, especially along Slovenia's coast where the 80-metre (260 ft) Strunjan cliff—the highest cliff on the entire Adriatic and the only one of its type on the eastern Adriatic coast—is located, on the Kvarner Gulf coast opposite Krk, and in Dalmatia north of Split. Rocks of the same type are found in Albania and on the western Adriatic coast.

There are alternations of maritime and alluvial sediments occurring in the Po Valley, at the Adriatic's north-west coast, and as far west as Piacenza, dating to the Pleistocene as the sea advanced and receded over the valley. An advance began after the Last Glacial Maximum, which brought the Adriatic to a high point at about 5,500 years ago. Since then, the Po delta has been prograding (expanding/extending). The rate of coastal zone progradation between 1000 BC and 1200 AD was 4 metres (13 ft) per year. In the 12th century, the delta advanced at a rate of 25 metres (82 ft) per year. In the 17th century, the delta began to become a human-controlled environment, as the excavation of artificial channels started; the channels and new distributaries of the Po have been prograding at rates of 50 metres (160 ft) per year or more since then. There are more than 20 other rivers flowing into the Adriatic Sea in Italy alone, also forming alluvial coastlines, including the lagoons of Venice, Grado and Caorle. There are smaller eastern Adriatic alluvial coasts—in the deltas of the Dragonja, Buna and Neretva rivers.

== Biogeography and ecology ==
The Adriatic Sea is a unique water body in respect of its overall biogeochemical physiognomy. It exports inorganic nutrients and imports particulate organic carbon and nitrogen through the Strait of Otranto—acting as a mineralization site. The exchange of the substances is made more complex by bathymetry of the Adriatic Sea—75% of water flowing north through the strait recirculates at the Palagruža Sill and North Adriatic adds no more than 3–4% of water to the South Adriatic. This is reflected in its biogeography and ecology, and particularly in the composition and properties of its ecosystems. Its main biogeographic units are the Northern Adriatic, the Central Adriatic, and the Southern Adriatic.

=== Flora and fauna ===
The unique nature of the Adriatic gives rise to an abundance of endemic flora and fauna. The Croatian National Biodiversity Strategy Action Plan identified more than 7,000 animal and plant species in the Adriatic Sea. The Central Adriatic is especially abundant in endemic plant species, with 535 identified species of green, brown and red algae. Four out of five Mediterranean seagrass species are found in the Adriatic Sea. The most common species are Cymodocea nodosa and Zostera noltii, while Zostera marina and Posidonia oceanica are comparatively rare.

A number of rare and threatened species are also found along the Adriatic's eastern coast; it is relatively clearer and less polluted than the western Adriatic coast—in part because the sea currents flow through the Adriatic in a counterclockwise direction, thus bringing clearer waters up the eastern coast and returning increasingly polluted water down the western coast. This circulation has significantly contributed to the biodiversity of the countries along the eastern Adriatic coast; the common bottlenose dolphin is frequent in the eastern coast's waters only, and the Croatian coast provides refuge for the critically endangered monk seal and sea turtles. Recent studies revealed that cetaceans and other marine megafaunas, that were once thought to be vagrants to Adriatic Sea, migrate and live in the semi-closed sea on larger scales. Largest of these live normally is the fin whale, and sperm whale, the largest of toothed whales also migrate but less common than fin whales, followed by Cuvier's beaked whales. Basking sharks and manta rays are some of migrant species to the sea. Historical presences of depleted or extinct species such as North Atlantic right whales (extinct or functionally extinct), Atlantic gray whales (extinct), and humpback whales have been speculated as well.

Tuna has been caught by the locals in the upper Adriatic for thousands of years. The very large schools consisted mainly of little tunny and moved as far as the Gulf of Trieste. However, increasing fishing prevented the migration of large schools of fish to the north. The last major tuna catch was made there in 1954 by the fishermen from Santa Croce, Contovello and Barcola.

The Northern Adriatic in particular is rich in endemic fish fauna. Around thirty species of fish are found in only one or two countries bordering the Adriatic Sea. These are particularly due to or dependent upon the karst morphology of the coastal or submarine topography; this includes inhabiting subterranean habitats, karst rivers, and areas around freshwater springs. There are 45 known subspecies endemic to the Adriatic's coasts and islands. In the Adriatic, there are at least 410 species and subspecies of fish, representing approximately 70% of Mediterranean taxa, with at least 7 species endemic to the Adriatic. Sixty-four known species are threatened with extinction, largely because of overfishing. Only a small fraction of the fish found in the Adriatic are attributed to recent processes such as Lessepsian migration, and escape from mariculture.

=== Protected areas ===
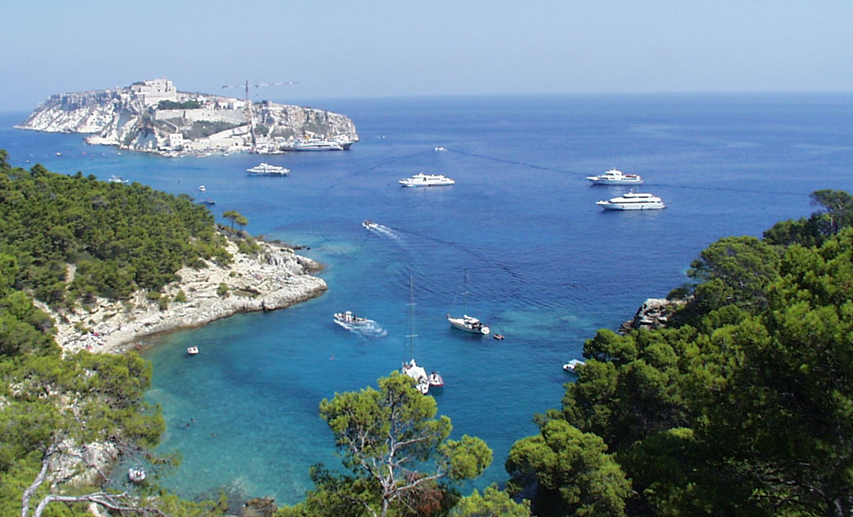
Tremiti Islands protected area

The biodiversity of the Adriatic is relatively high, and several marine protected areas have been established by countries along its coasts. In Italy, these are Miramare in the Gulf of Trieste (in the Northern Adriatic), Torre del Cerrano and Tremiti Islands in the Middle Adriatic basin and Torre Guaceto in southern Apulia. The Miramare protected area was established in 1986 and covers 30 hectares (74 acres) of coast and 90 hectares (220 acres) of sea. The area encompasses 1.8 kilometres (1.1 mi) of coastline near the Miramare promontory in the Gulf of Trieste. The Torre del Cerrano protected area was created in 2009, extending 3 nautical miles (5.6 km; 3.5 mi) into the sea and along 7 kilometres (4.3 mi) of coastline. Various zones of the protected area cover 37 square kilometres (14 sq mi) of sea surface. The Tremiti Islands reserve has been protected since 1989, while the Tremiti islands themselves are part of the Gargano National Park. The Torre Guaceto protected area, located near Brindisi and Carovigno, covers a sea surface of 2,227 hectares (5,500 acres) and is adjacent to the Torre Guaceto State Reserve covering 1,114 hectares (2,750 acres) of coast and sharing an 8-kilometre (5.0 mi) coastline with the marine protected area. Furthermore, there are 10 internationally important (Ramsar) wetland reserves in Italy located along the Adriatic coast.

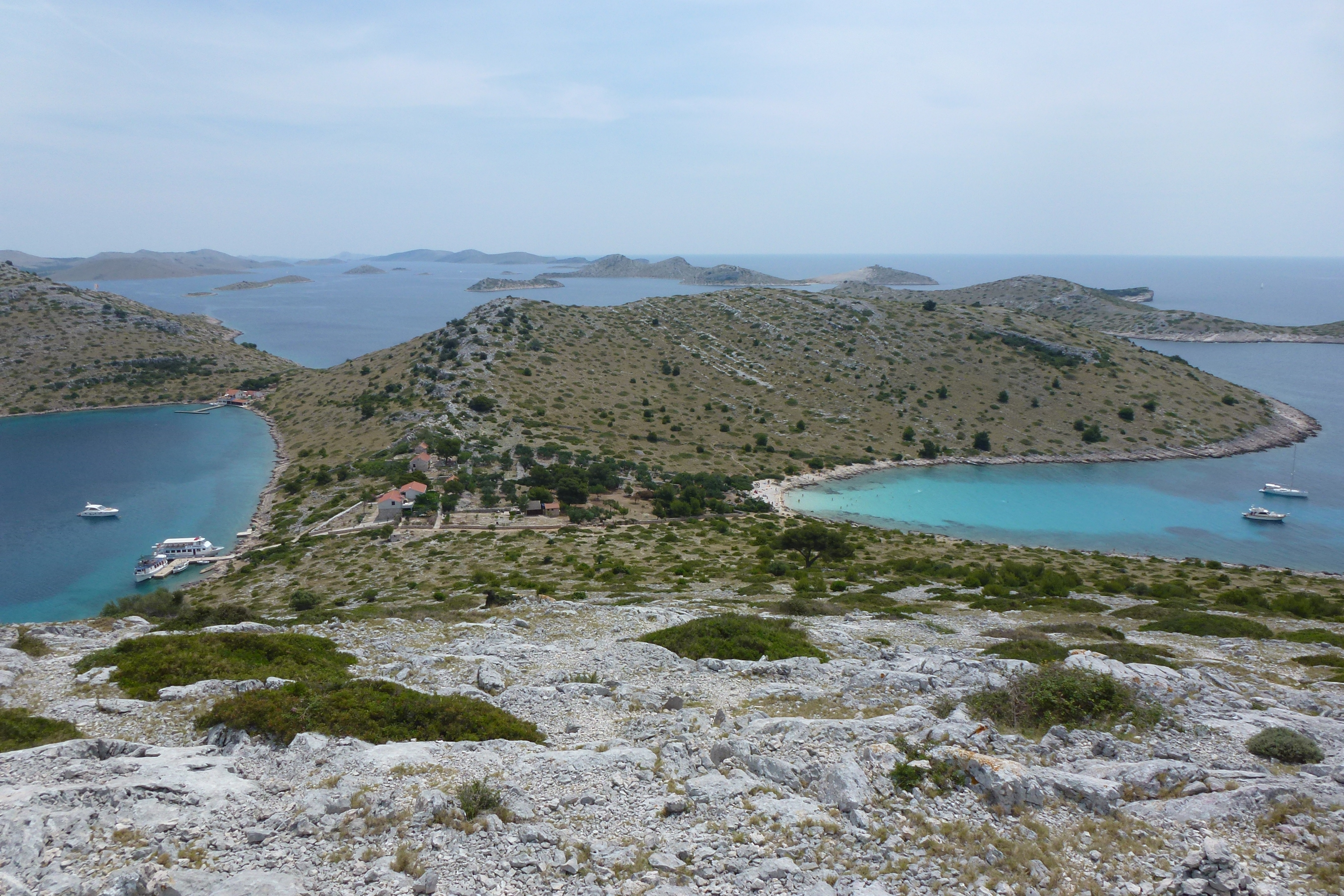
Kornati National Park

There are seven marine protected areas in Croatia: Brijuni and the Lim Canal off the Istria peninsula's coast, near Pula and Rovinj respectively; Kornati and Telašćica in the Middle Adriatic basin, near Zadar; and Lastovo, Bay of Mali Ston (Croatian: Malostonski zaljev) and Mljet in southern Dalmatia. The Brijuni national park encompasses the 743.3-hectare (1,837-acre) archipelago itself and 2,651.7 hectares (6,552 acres) of surrounding sea; it became a national park in 1999. The Lim Canal is a 10-kilometre (6.2 mi) ria of the Pazinčica river. The Kornati national park was established in 1980; it covers approximately 220 square kilometres (85 sq mi), including 89 islands and islets. The marine environment encompasses three-quarters of the total area, while the island shores' combined length equals 238 kilometres (148 mi). Telašćica is a nature park established on Dugi Otok in 1988. The park covers 69 kilometres (43 mi) of coastline, 22.95 square kilometres (8.86 sq mi) of land and 44.55 square kilometres (17.20 sq mi) of sea. The Bay of Mali Ston is located at the border of Croatia and Bosnia–Herzegovina, north of the Pelješac peninsula. The marine protected area covers 48 square kilometres (19 sq mi). The Lastovo nature park was established in 2006, and it includes 44 islands and islets, 53 square kilometres (20 sq mi) of land and 143 square kilometres (55 sq mi) of sea surface. The Mljet national park was established in 1960, covering a 24-square-kilometre (9.3 sq mi) marine protection area. In addition, there is a Ramsar wetland reserve in Croatia—the Neretva river's delta.

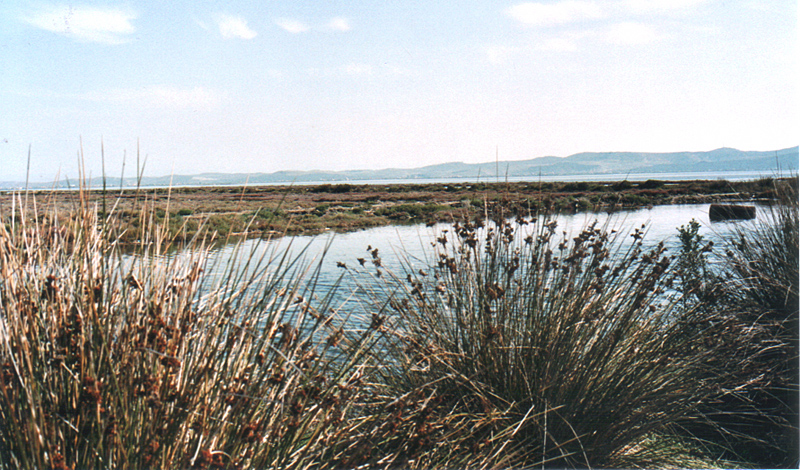
Karavasta Lagoon in Albania

In Slovenia, the marine and coastal protected nature areas are the Sečovlje Salina Landscape Park, Strunjan Landscape Park, Škocjan Inlet Nature Reserve, and the Debeli Rtič, Cape Madona and Lakes in Fiesa natural monuments. The Sečovlje Salina Landscape Park was established in 1990, covers 721 hectares (1,780 acres), and includes four nature reserves. In 1993, the area was designated a Ramsar site; it is also a site of international importance for waterbird species. The 429-hectare (1,060-acre) Strunjan Landscape Park was established in 2004 and comprises two nature reserves. It includes a 4 kilometres (2.5 mi) long cliff, the northernmost Mediterranean salt field and the only Slovenian lagoon system. It is also the northernmost point of growth of some Mediterranean plant species. The Škocjan Inlet Nature Reserve was established in 1998 and covers 122 hectares (300 acres). The Debeli Rtič natural monument covers 24 hectares (59 acres), the Cape Madona natural monument covers 12 hectares (30 acres), and the Lakes in Fiesa natural monument, with the coastal lake as the only brackish lake in Slovenia, covers 2.1 hectares (5.2 acres).

In 2010, Albania established its first marine protection area, the Karaburun-Sazan National Marine Park at the Karaburun Peninsula where the Adriatic and Ionian Seas meet. The park covers a total of 12,570 hectares (31,100 acres). Two additional marine protection areas are planned in Albania: the Cape of Rodon (Albanian: Kepi i Rodonit) and Porto Palermo. In addition, Albania is home to two Ramsar wetland reserves: Karavasta Lagoon, and Butrint. Neither Bosnia–Herzegovina nor Montenegro have or plan to establish any marine protection areas.

=== Pollution ===
The Adriatic Sea ecosystem is threatened by excessive input of nutrients through drainage from agricultural land and wastewater flowing from cities; this includes both along its coast and from rivers draining into the sea—especially from the Po River. Venice is often cited as an example of polluted coastal waters where shipping, transportation, farming, manufacturing and wastewater disposal contribute to polluting the sea. A further risk is presented by ballast water discharge by ships, especially tankers. Still, since most of the cargo handled by the Adriatic ports, and virtually all liquid (tanker) cargo handled by the ports, is coming to—not coming from—the Adriatic Basin, the risk from ballast water (from tankers expelling ballast water then loading in the Adriatic) remains minimal. However, proposed export oil pipelines were objected to specifically because of this issue. Oil spills are a major concern in terms of potential environmental impact and damage to tourism and fisheries. It is estimated that if a major oil spill happened, a million people would lose their livelihoods in Croatia alone. An additional risk is presented by oil refineries in the Po River basin where oil spills have occurred before, in addition to accidents occurring in the Adriatic already, so far with no significant environmental consequences. Since 2006, Italy has been considering the construction of an offshore and an onshore LNG terminal in the Gulf of Trieste, as well as a pipeline, in the immediate vicinity of the Slovenian–Italian border. The Slovenian government and municipalities, the municipal council of Trieste, and non-governmental organisations have voiced concern over their environmental hazards, effect on transport and effect on tourism.

Another source of pollution of the Adriatic is solid waste. Drifting waste—occasionally relatively large quantities of material, especially waste plastic—is transported northwest by the sirocco. Air pollution in the Adriatic Basin is associated with the large industrial centres in the Po River valley and the large industrial cities along the coast.

Italy and Yugoslavia established a joint commission to protect the Adriatic Sea from pollution in 1977; the organization later changed with Slovenia, Croatia and Montenegro replacing Yugoslavia. Future pollution hazards are addressed and pollution hotspots are assessed not only by nations in the basin but also through regional projects with World Bank support. 27 such hotspots have been determined as of 2011, 6 warranting an urgent response.

== History ==
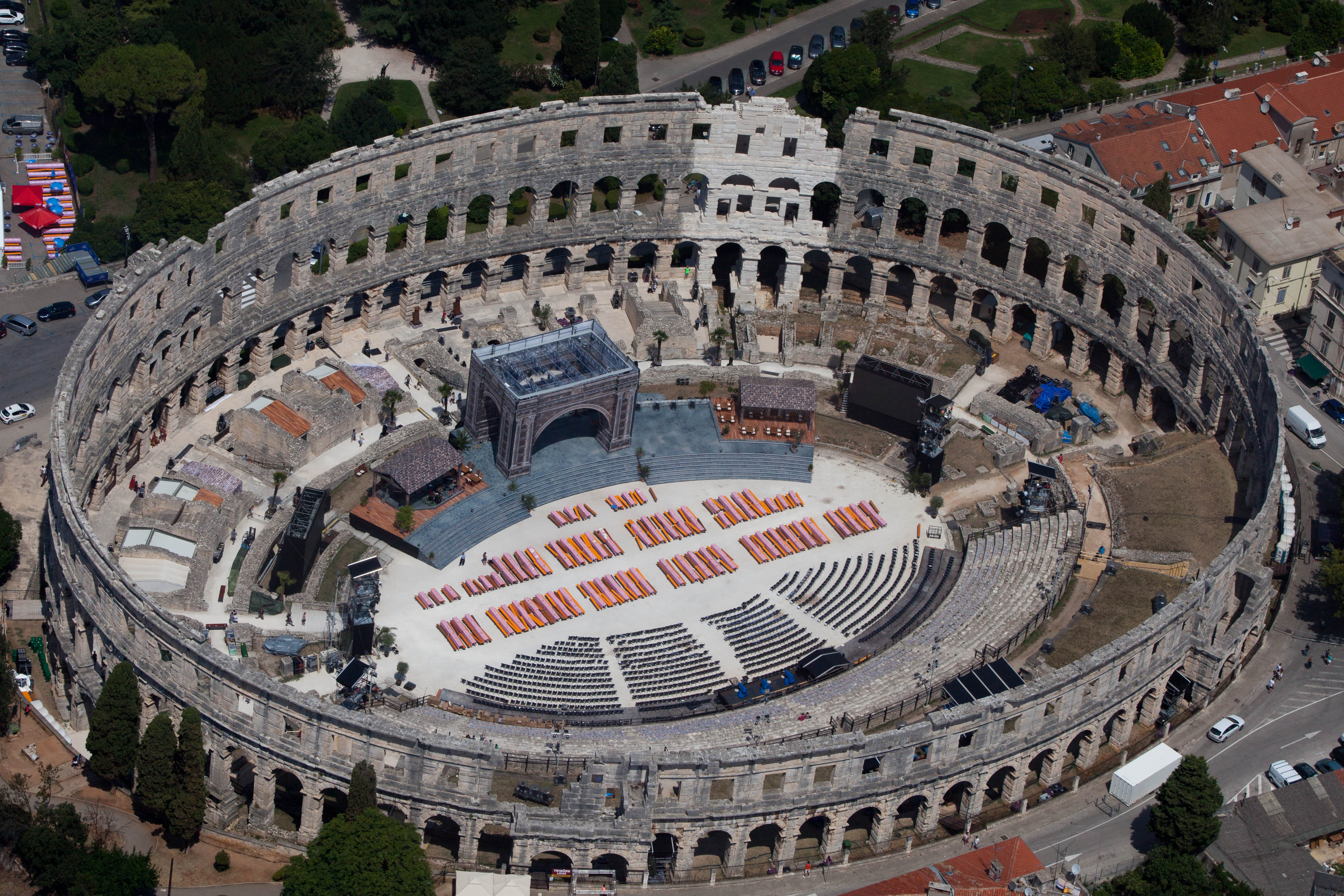
Pula Arena, one of the six largest surviving Roman amphitheatres

Settlements along the Adriatic dating to between 6100 and 5900 BC appear in Albania and Dalmatia on the eastern Adriatic coast, related to the Cardium pottery culture. During classical antiquity, Illyrians inhabited the eastern coast, and the western coast was inhabited by the peoples of Ancient Italy, mainly Etruscans, before the Roman Republic's rise. Greek colonisation of the Adriatic dates back to the 7th and 6th centuries BC when the ancient cities of Epidamnos and Apollonia were founded. The Greeks soon expanded further north establishing several cities, including Ancona, Black Corcyra, Epidaurus, Issa, with trade established as far north as the Po River delta, where an emporium (trading station) was founded in Adria.

=== Roman era ===
Roman economic and military influence in the region began to grow with the creation by 246 BC of a major naval base at Brundisium (now Brindisi), which was established to bar Carthaginian ships from the Adriatic during the Punic Wars. This led to conflict with the Illyrians, who lived in a collection of semi-Hellenized kingdoms that covered much of the Balkans and controlled the eastern shore of the sea, resulting in the Illyrian Wars from 229 to 168 BC. The initial Roman intervention in 229 BC, motivated in part by a desire to suppress Illyrian piracy in the Adriatic, marked the first time that the Roman navy crossed that sea to launch a military campaign. Those wars ended with the eastern shore becoming a province of the Roman Republic. However, resistance to Roman rule continued sporadically and Rome did not completely consolidate control of the region until Augustus's general Tiberius put down the Great Illyrian Revolt, a bitter struggle waged from 6 to 9 AD. Following the repression of the revolt the Roman province of Illyricum was split into Dalmatia and Pannonia. Most of the eastern shore of the Adriatic was part of Dalmatia, except for the southernmost portion, part of the province of Macedonia, and the peninsula of Istria on the northern part of the eastern shore; Istria contained the important Roman colony at Pula and was incorporated into the province of Italy.

During the Roman period, Brundisium, on the western shore, and Apollonia and Dyrrachium (originally called Epidamnos, now Durrës in Albania) on the eastern shore became important ports. Brundisium was linked by the Via Appia road to the city of Rome, and Dyrrachium and Apollonia were both on the Via Egnatia, a road that by about 130 BC the Romans had extended eastward across the Balkans to Byzantium (later Constantinople, now Istanbul). This made the sea passage across the Adriatic between Brundisium and Dyrrachium (or Apollonia) a link in the primary route for travelers, trade, and troop movements, between Rome and the East. This route played a major role in some of the military operations that marked the end of the Roman Republic and the start of the imperial period. Sulla used it during the First Mithridatic War. During Caesar's Civil War, there was a three-month delay in Caesar's Balkan campaign against Pompey caused when winter storms on the Adriatic and a naval blockade held up Mark Antony from reaching him from Brundisium with reinforcements; after the reinforcements finally arrived Caesar made an unsuccessful attempt to capture Dyrrachium before the campaign moved inland. Marc Antony and Octavian (later Augustus) crossed the Adriatic to Dyrrachium with their armies in their campaign against two of Caesar's assassins, Brutus and Cassius, that culminated in the Battle of Philippi. Brundisium and Dyrrachium remained important ports well after the Roman period, but an earthquake in the 3rd century AD changed the path of a river causing Apollonia's harbor to silt up, and the city to decline.

Another city on the Italian coast of the Adriatic that increased in importance during the Roman era was Ravenna. During the reign of Augustus, it became a major naval base as part of his program to re-organize the Roman navy to better protect commerce in the Mediterranean. During the 4th century AD the emperors of the Western Roman Empire had moved their official residence north from Rome to Mediolanum (now Milan) in order to be better able to control the military frontier with the Germanic tribes. In 402 AD, during a period of repeated Germanic invasions of Italy, the capital was shifted to Ravenna because nearby marshes made it more defensible, and the Adriatic provided an easy escape path by sea. When the Western Empire fell in 476 AD Ravenna became the capital of the Ostrogothic Kingdom of Italy.

=== Middle Ages ===
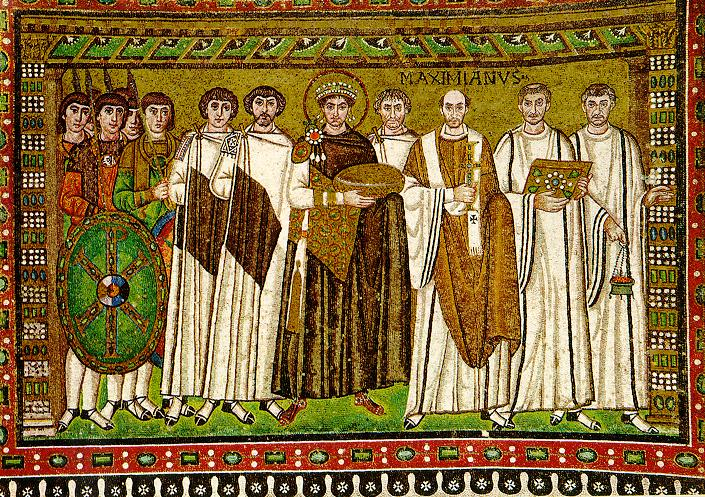
Mosaic of Emperor Justinian and his court, from the Basilica of San Vitale in Ravenna, Italy

In the Early Middle Ages, after the Roman Empire's decline, the Adriatic's coasts were ruled by Ostrogoths, Lombards and the Byzantine Empire. The Ostrogothic Kingdom ruled Italy following the fall of the Western Roman Empire in 476 AD. However, during the reign of Justinian the Byzantine Empire sent an army under the general Belisarius to regain control of Italy, resulting in the Gothic War (535–554). The Byzantines established the Exarchate of Ravenna and by 553 AD their viceroy (Exarch) ruled almost the entire Italian peninsula from that city. In 568 AD the Lombards invaded northern Italy, and over the course of the next century or so the importance of the Exarchate declined as the territory under Lombard control expanded and as the Byzantine outpost of Venice became increasingly independent. In 752 AD the Lombards overthrew the Exarchate, ending the influence of the Byzantine Empire on the western shore of the Adriatic for a few centuries.

The last part of the period saw the rise of the Carolingian Empire and then the Frankish Kingdom of Italy, which controlled the Adriatic Sea's western coast, while Byzantine Dalmatia on the east coast gradually shrunk into Dalmatian city-states following the Avar and Croatian invasions starting in the 7th century. The Republic of Venice, one of the maritime republics, was founded during this period and went on to become a significant maritime power after receiving a Byzantine tax exemption in 1082. The end of the period brought about the Holy Roman Empire's control over the Kingdom of Italy (which would last until the Peace of Westphalia in 1648), the establishment of an independent Kingdom of Croatia and the Byzantine Empire's return to the southern Apennine peninsula. In addition, the Papal States were carved out in the area around Rome and central Italy in the 8th century.

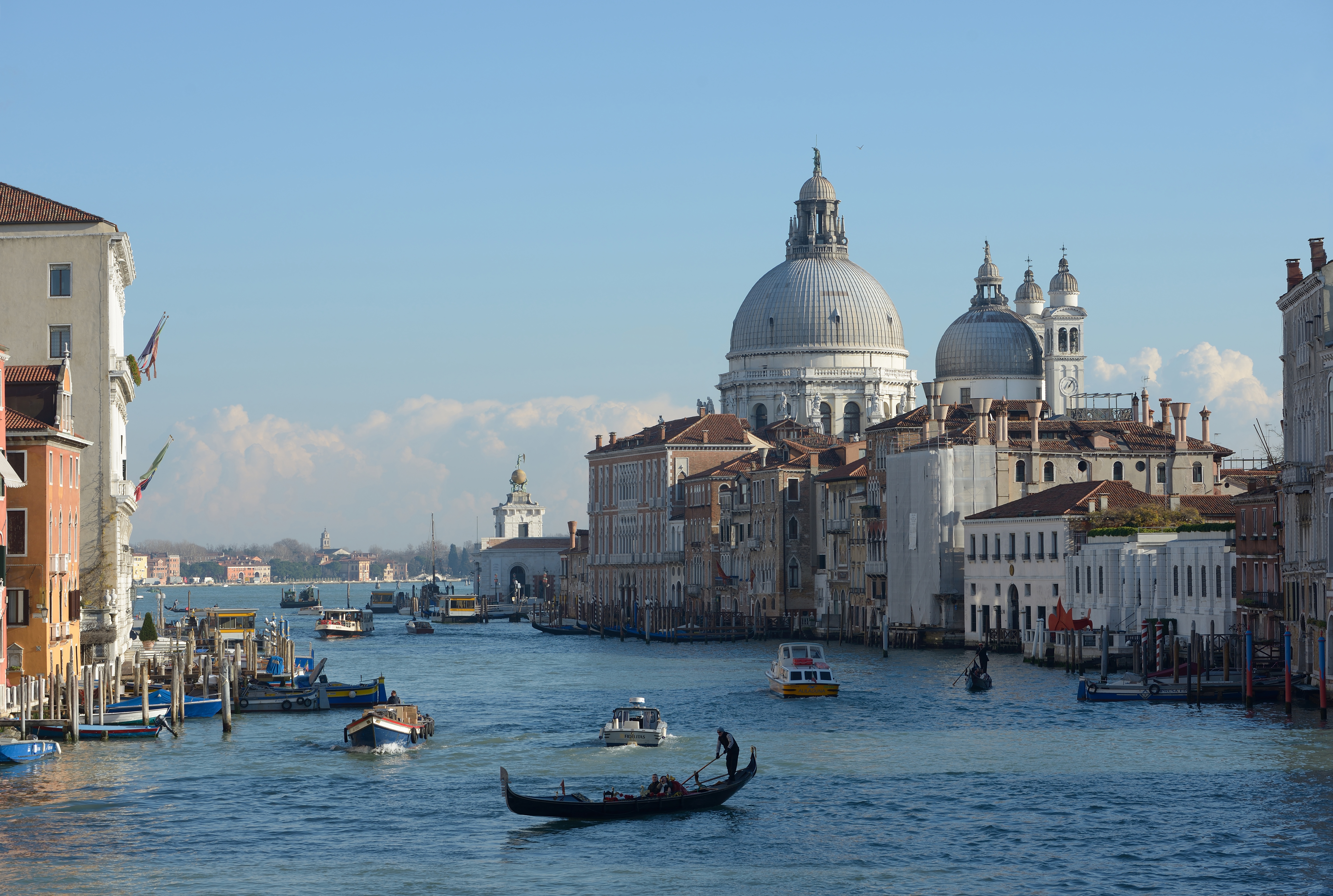
The Republic of Venice was a leading maritime power in Europe.

The High Middle Ages in the Adriatic Sea basin saw further territorial changes, including the Norman conquest of southern Italy ending the Byzantine presence on the Apennine peninsula in the 11th and 12th centuries (the territory would become the Kingdom of Naples in 1282) and the control of a substantial part of the eastern Adriatic coast by the Kingdom of Hungary after a personal union was established between Croatia and Hungary in 1102. In this period, the Republic of Venice began to expand its territory and influence. In 1202, the Fourth Crusade was diverted to conquer Zadar at the behest of the Venetians—the first instance of a Crusader force attacking a Catholic city—before proceeding to sack Constantinople. In the 13th century, Venice established itself as a leading maritime nation. During much of the 12th and 13th centuries, Venice and the Republic of Genoa were engaged in warfare culminating in the War of Chioggia, ousting the Genoese from the Adriatic. Still, the 1381 Treaty of Turin that ended the war required Venice to renounce claims to Dalmatia, after losing the territory to Hungary in 1358. In the same year, the Republic of Ragusa was established in Dubrovnik as a city-state after it was freed from Venetian suzerainty.

Venice regained Dalmatia in 1409 and held it for nearly four hundred years, with the republic's apex of trading and military power in the first half of the 15th century. The 15th and the 16th centuries brought about the Byzantine Empire's destruction in 1453 and the Ottoman Empire's expansion that reached Adriatic shores in present-day Albania and Montenegro as well as the immediate hinterland of the Dalmatian coast, defeating the Hungarian and Croatian armies at Krbava in 1493 and Mohács in 1526. These defeats spelled the end of an independent Hungarian kingdom, and both Croatian and Hungarian nobility chose Ferdinand I of the House of Habsburg as their new ruler, bringing the Habsburg monarchy to the shore of the Adriatic Sea, where it would remain for nearly four hundred years. The Ottomans and Venetians fought a series of wars, but until the 17th century these were not fought in the Adriatic area. Ottoman raids on the Adriatic coasts effectively ceased after the massive setback in the Battle of Lepanto in October 1571.

=== Early modern period ===
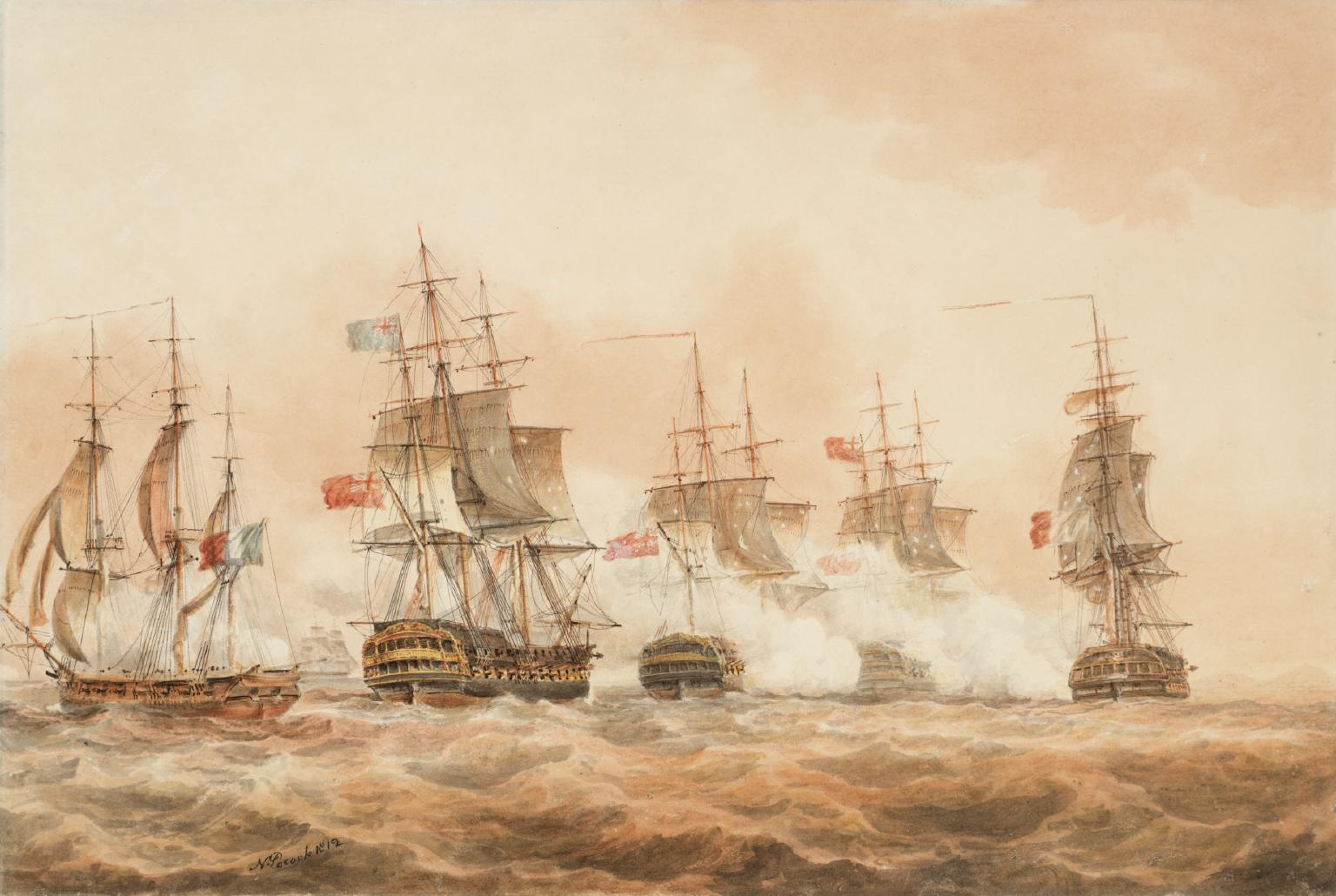
Battle of Lissa, 1811

The 17th century's final territorial changes were caused by the Morean or Sixth Ottoman–Venetian War, when in 1699 Venice slightly enlarged its possessions in Dalmatia. In 1797, the Republic of Venice was abolished after the French conquest. The Venetian territory was then handed over to Austria and briefly ruled as part of the Archduchy of Austria. The territory was turned back over to France after the Peace of Pressburg in 1805 when the territory in the Po valley became an integral part of the new Napoleonic Kingdom of Italy.

The new kingdom included the province of Romagna, thus removing the Papal State from the Adriatic coast; however, Trieste, Istria and Dalmatia were joined into a set of separate provinces of the French Empire: the Illyrian Provinces. These were created in 1809 through the Treaty of Schönbrunn; they represented the end of Venetian rule on the eastern Adriatic coast, as well as the end of the Republic of Ragusa. The Adriatic Sea was a minor theatre in the Napoleonic Wars; the Adriatic campaign of 1807–1814 involved the Royal Navy contesting the Adriatic's control by the combined navies of France, Italy and the Kingdom of Naples. During the campaign, the British navy occupied Vis and established its base there in Port St. George.

The campaign reached its climax in the 1811 Battle of Lissa, and ended with British and Austrian forces seizing the coastal cities on the eastern Adriatic coast from the French. Days before the Battle of Waterloo, the Congress of Vienna awarded the Illyrian Provinces (spanning from the Gulf of Trieste to the Bay of Kotor) to Austria. The Congress of Vienna also created the Kingdom of Lombardy–Venetia which encompassed the city of Venice, the surrounding coast and a substantial hinterland, and was controlled by Austria. In the Apennine peninsula's south, the Kingdom of the Two Sicilies was formed in 1816 by unifying the kingdoms of Naples and Sicily.

=== Modern period ===
Battle of Lissa, 1866

The process of Italian unification culminated in the Second Italian War of Independence, resulting in the Kingdom of Sardinia annexing all territories along the western Adriatic coast south of Venetia in 1860, and the 1861 establishment of the Kingdom of Italy in its place. The Kingdom of Italy expanded in 1866: it annexed Venetia, but its navy was defeated in the Adriatic near Vis. Following the Austro-Hungarian Compromise of 1867 and the Croatian–Hungarian Settlement of 1868, the control of much of the eastern Adriatic coast was redefined. The cisleithanian (Austrian) part of Austria-Hungary spanned from the Austrian Littoral to the Bay of Kotor, with the exception of the Croatian Littoral mainland. In the territory outside the Austrian Littoral, special status was given to Fiume (modern-day Rijeka) as a separate part of the Kingdom of Hungary. The rest of the territory was made a part of the Kingdom of Croatia-Slavonia, which in turn was also in the Transleithanian part of the dual monarchy. The Adriatic coastline controlled by the Ottoman Empire was reduced by the Congress of Berlin in 1878, through recognition of the independence of the Principality of Montenegro, which controlled the coast south of the Bay of Kotor to the Bojana River. The Ottoman Empire lost all territories along the Adriatic following the First Balkan War and consequent 1913 Treaty of London that established an independent Albania.

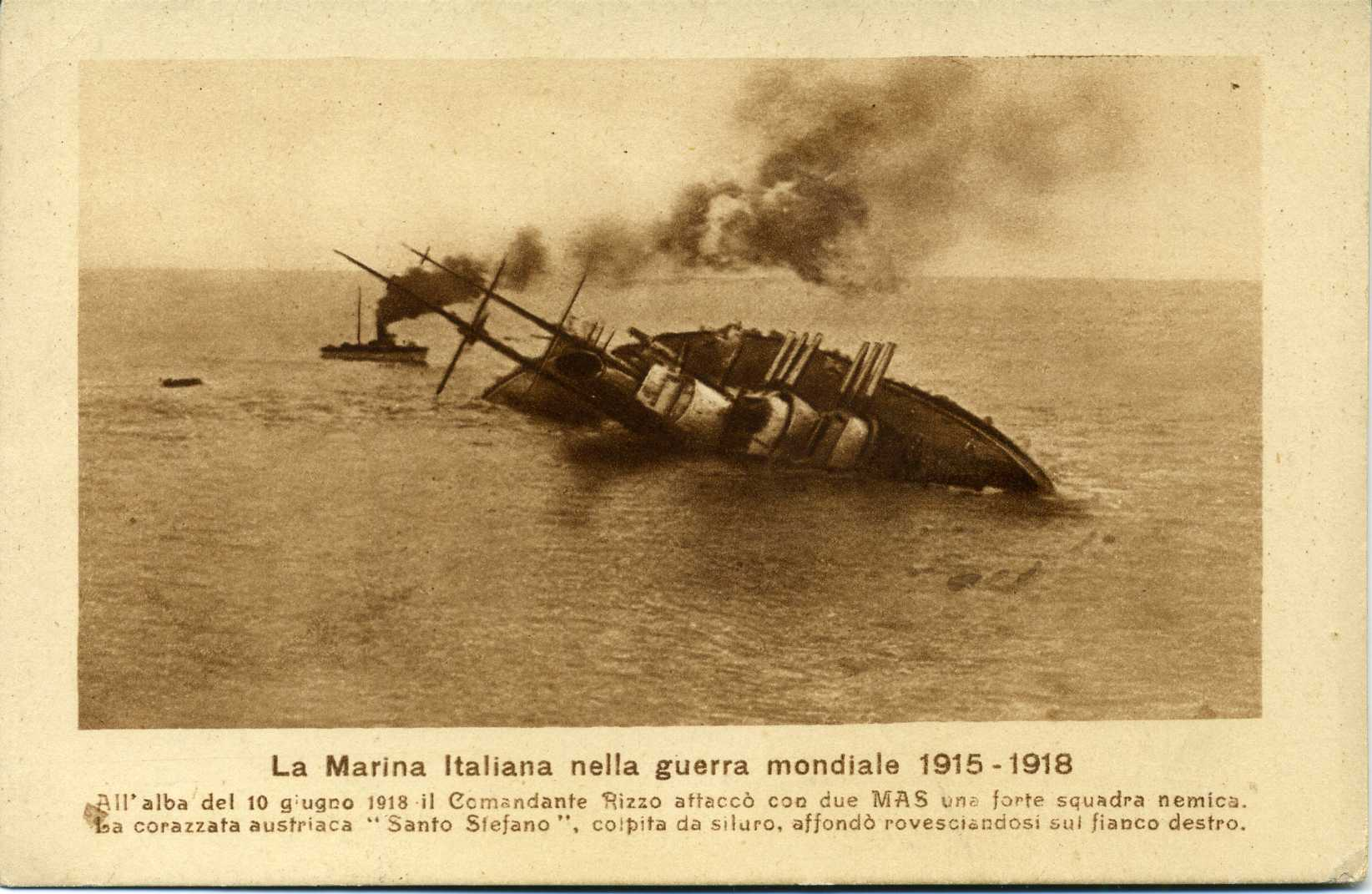
The last moments of SMS Szent István, hit and sank by the Italian MAS

The World War I Adriatic Campaign was largely limited to blockade attempts by the Allies and the effort of the Central Powers to thwart the British, French and Italian moves. Italy joined the Allies in April 1915 with the Treaty of London, which promised Italy the Austrian Littoral, northern Dalmatia, the port of Vlorë, most of the eastern Adriatic islands and Albania as a protectorate. The treaty provided the basis for all the following divisions between Italy and Yugoslavia. In 1918, the Montenegrin national assembly voted to unite with the Kingdom of Serbia, giving the latter access to the Adriatic. Another short-lived, unrecognised state established in 1918 was the State of Slovenes, Croats and Serbs, formed from parts of Austria-Hungary, comprising most of the former monarchy's Adriatic coastline. Later that year, the Kingdom of Serbia and the State of Slovenes, Croats and Serbs formed the Kingdom of Serbs, Croats and Slovenes—subsequently renamed Yugoslavia. The proponents of the new union in the Croatian parliament saw the move as a safeguard against Italian expansionism as stipulated in the Treaty of London. The treaty was largely disregarded by Britain and France because of conflicting promises made to Serbia and a perceived lack of Italian contribution to the war effort outside Italy itself. The 1919 Treaty of Saint-Germain-en-Laye did transfer the Austrian Littoral and Istria to Italy but awarded Dalmatia to Yugoslavia. Following the war, a private force of demobilized Italian soldiers seized Rijeka and set up the Italian Regency of Carnaro—seen as a harbinger of Fascism—in order to force the recognition of Italian claims to the city. After sixteen months of the Regency's existence, the 1920 Treaty of Rapallo redefined the Italian–Yugoslav borders, among other things transferring Zadar and the islands of Cres, Lastovo and Palagruža to Italy, securing the island of Krk for Yugoslavia and establishing the Free State of Fiume; this new state was abolished in 1924 by the Treaty of Rome that awarded Fiume (modern Rijeka) to Italy and Sušak to Yugoslavia.

=== Late 20th century ===
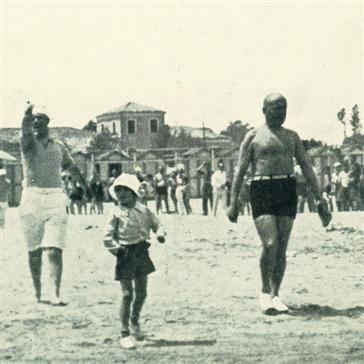
The Duce Benito Mussolini in a beach of Riccione, in 1932

During World War II, the Adriatic saw only limited naval action, starting with the Italian invasion of Albania and the joint Axis invasion of Yugoslavia. The latter led to the annexation of a large part of Dalmatia and nearly all the eastern Adriatic islands by Italy and the establishment of two puppet states, the Independent State of Croatia and the Kingdom of Montenegro, which controlled the remainder of the former Yugoslav Adriatic coast. In 1947, after the Armistice between Italy and Allied armed forces and the war's end, Italy (now a republic) and the Allies signed the Treaty of Peace with Italy. The treaty reversed all wartime annexations, guaranteed the independence of Albania, created the Free Territory of Trieste (FTT) as a city-state, and gave communist Yugoslavia most of the Slovenian Littoral, as well as Istria, the islands of Cres, Lastovo and Palagruža, and the cities of Zadar and Rijeka. The FTT was partitioned in 1954: Trieste itself and the area to the North of it were placed under Italian control, while the rest came under Yugoslav control. This arrangement was made permanent in the 1975 Treaty of Osimo.

During the Cold War, the Adriatic Sea became the southernmost flank of the Iron Curtain as Italy joined NATO, while the Warsaw Pact established bases in Albania. After the fall of communism, Yugoslavia broke apart: Slovenia and Croatia declared independence in 1991, and Bosnia–Herzegovina followed in 1992, while Montenegro remained in a federation with Serbia, officially called Serbia and Montenegro. The ensuing Croatian War of Independence included limited naval engagements and a blockade of Croatia's coast by the Yugoslav Navy, leading to the Battle of the Dalmatian channels and a later withdrawal of Yugoslav vessels. Montenegro declared itself independent in 2006, effectively land-locking Serbia. The period also saw the Adriatic Sea as the theatre of several NATO operations, including the blockade of Yugoslavia, intervention in Bosnia and Herzegovina and the 1999 bombing of Yugoslavia.

== Boundaries ==
Italy and Yugoslavia defined their Adriatic continental shelf delimitation in 1968, with an additional agreement signed in 1975 on the Gulf of Trieste boundary, following the Treaty of Osimo. The boundary agreed in 1968 extends 353 nautical miles (654 km; 406 mi) and consists of 43 points connected by straight lines or circular arc segments. The additional boundary agreed upon in 1975 consists of 5 points, extending from an end point of the 1968 line. All successor states of former Yugoslavia accepted the agreements. In the Adriatic's southernmost areas the border was not determined in order to avoid prejudicing the location of the tripoint with the Albanian continental shelf border, which remains undefined. Before the breakup of Yugoslavia, Albania, Italy and Yugoslavia initially proclaimed 15-nautical-mile (28 km; 17 mi) territorial waters, subsequently reduced to international-standard 12 nautical miles (22 km; 14 mi) and all sides adopted baseline systems (mostly in the 1970s). Albania and Italy determined their sea border in 1992 according to the equidistance principle. Following Croatian EU membership, the Adriatic became an internal sea of the EU. The United Nations Convention on the Law of the Sea defines the Adriatic Sea as an enclosed or semi-enclosed sea.

=== Adriatic Euroregion ===
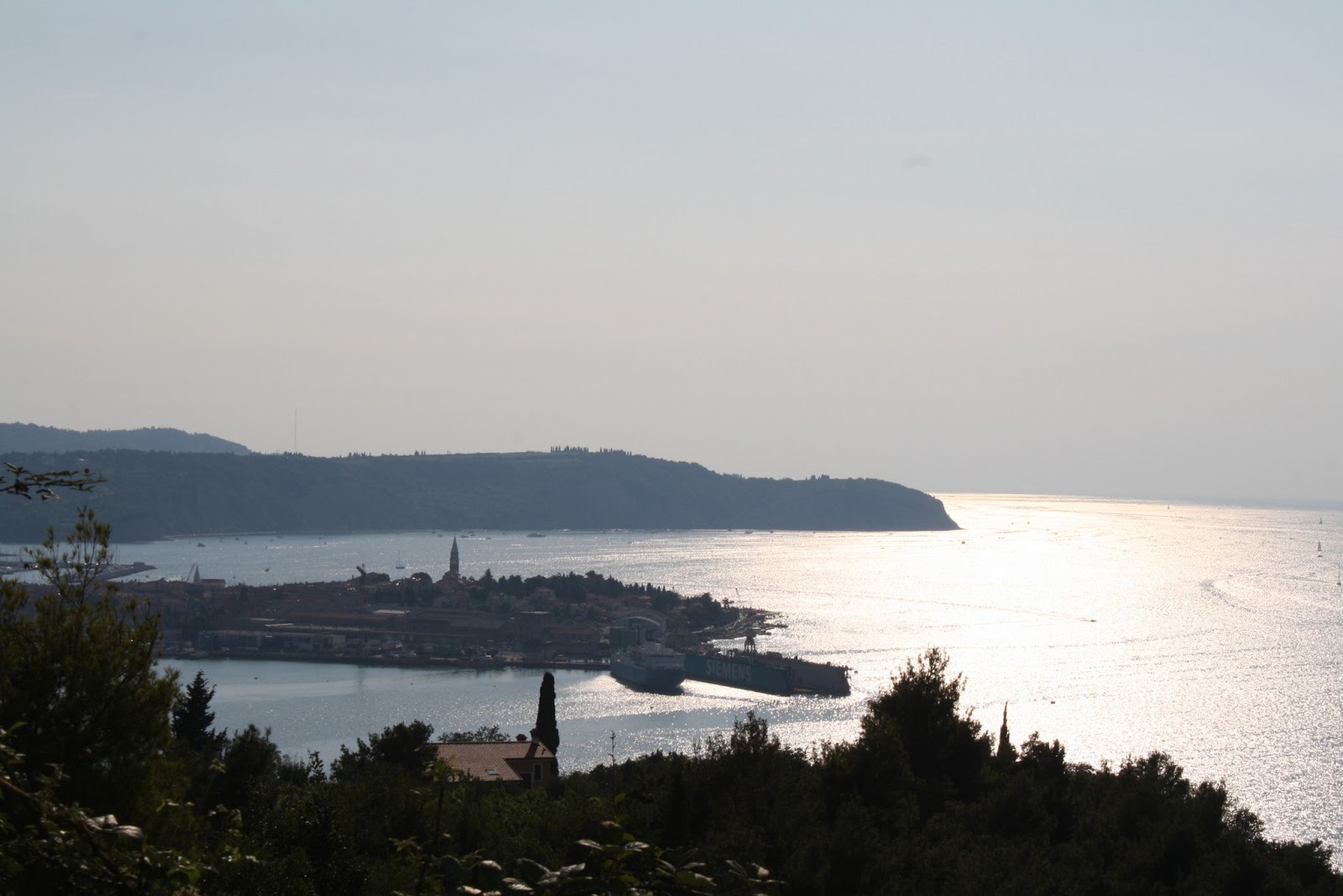
The town of Izola in the Gulf of Koper, southwestern Slovenia

The Adriatic Euroregion was established in Pula in 2006 to promote trans-regional and trans-national cooperation in the Adriatic Sea area and serve as an Adriatic framework to help resolve issues of regional importance. The Adriatic Euroregion consists of 23 members: the Apulia, Molise, Abruzzo, Marche, Emilia-Romagna, Veneto and Friuli-Venezia Giulia regions of Italy; the municipality of Izola in Slovenia; the Istria, Primorje-Gorski Kotar, Lika-Senj, Zadar, Šibenik-Knin, Split-Dalmatia and Dubrovnik-Neretva counties of Croatia; the Herzegovina-Neretva Canton of Bosnia–Herzegovina; the municipalities of Kotor and Tivat in Montenegro; the Fier, Vlorë, Tirana, Shkodër, Durrës and Lezhë counties of Albania; and the Greek prefectures of Thesprotia and Corfu.

=== Disputes ===
The former Yugoslav republics' land borders were decided by demarcation commissions implementing the AVNOJ decisions of 1943 and 1945, but the exact course has not been agreed upon by the successor states, which makes the maritime boundaries' definition difficult; the maritime borders were not defined at all in the time of Yugoslavia. In addition, the maritime boundary between Albania and Montenegro was not defined before the 1990s.

Croatia and Slovenia started negotiations to define maritime borders in the Gulf of Piran in 1992 but failed to agree, resulting in a dispute. Both countries also declared their economic zones, which partially overlap. Croatia's application to become an EU member state was initially suspended pending resolution of its border disputes with Slovenia. These disputes with Slovenia were eventually settled with an agreement to accept the decision of an international arbitration commission set up via the UN, enabling Croatia to progress towards EU membership. Croatia is still not following the resolution of the international arbitration for the Gulf of Piran. A dispute over the gulf is still on going with the Croatians handing out fines to Slovenian fishermen that are following the agreed economic. Aside from the EU membership difficulty, even before its settling the dispute has caused no major practical problems.

The maritime boundary between Bosnia–Herzegovina and Croatia was formally settled in 1999, but a few issues are still in dispute—the Klek peninsula and two islets in the border area. The Croatia–Montenegro maritime boundary is disputed in the Bay of Kotor, at the Prevlaka peninsula. This dispute was exacerbated by the peninsula's occupation by the Yugoslav People's Army and later by the (Serbian–Montenegrin) FR Yugoslav Army, which in turn was replaced by a United Nations observer mission that lasted until 2002. Croatia took over the area with an agreement that allowed Montenegrin presence in the bay's Croatian waters, and the dispute has become far less contentious since Montenegro's independence in 2006.

== Economy ==
=== Fishing ===
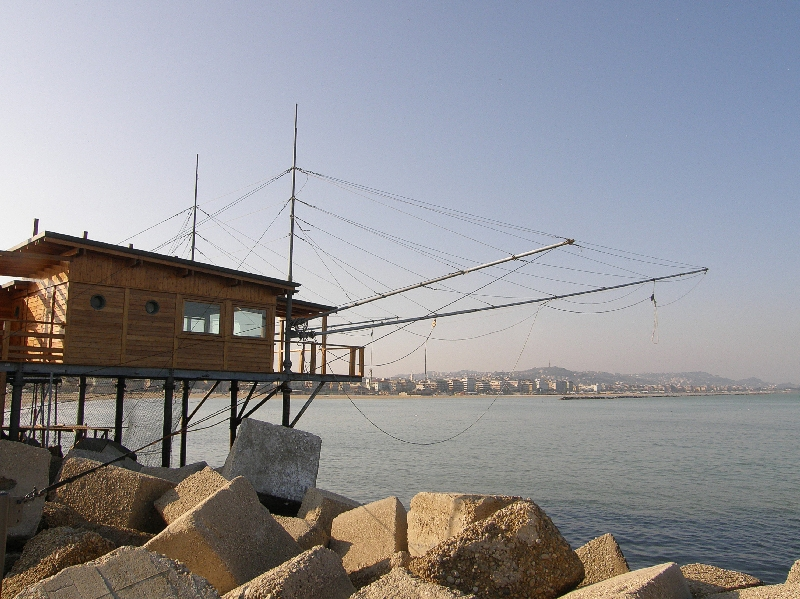
A Trabucco, old fishing machine typical of Abruzzo region in Italy

The Adriatic Sea fishery's production is distributed among countries in the basin. In 2000, the nominal—on a live weight basis—total landings of all Adriatic fisheries reached 110,000 tonnes (108,000 long tons). Overfishing is a recognised problem—450 species of fish live in the Adriatic Sea, including 120 species threatened by excessive commercial fishing, a problem exacerbated by pollution and global warming. Overexploited species include common dentex, red scorpionfish, monkfish, John Dory, blue shark, spiny dogfish, mullet, red mullet, Norway lobster, as well as European hake, and sardines. Turtles and common bottlenose dolphins are also being killed by fishing nets. The depleted fish stock, and Croatia's Ecological and Fisheries Protection Zone (ZERP) contributed to accusations of overfishing exchanged between Italian and Croatian fishermen. ZERP was introduced in 2003, but its application to EU member states was suspended in 2004. The depleted stocks of fish are being addressed through a new proposed EU fisheries policy that was scheduled to take effect in 2013, when Croatia acceded to the EU, and restore the stocks to sustainable levels by 2015.

The largest volume of fish harvesting was in Italy, where the total production volume in 2007 stood at 465,637 tonnes (458,283 long tons). In 2003, 28.8% of Italian fisheries production volume was generated in the Northern and central Adriatic, and 24.5% in Apulia (from the Southern Adriatic and Ionian Sea). Italian fisheries, including those operating outside the Adriatic, employed 60,700 in the primary sector, including aquaculture (which comprises 40% of the total fisheries production). The total fisheries output's gross value in 2002 was $1.9 billion.

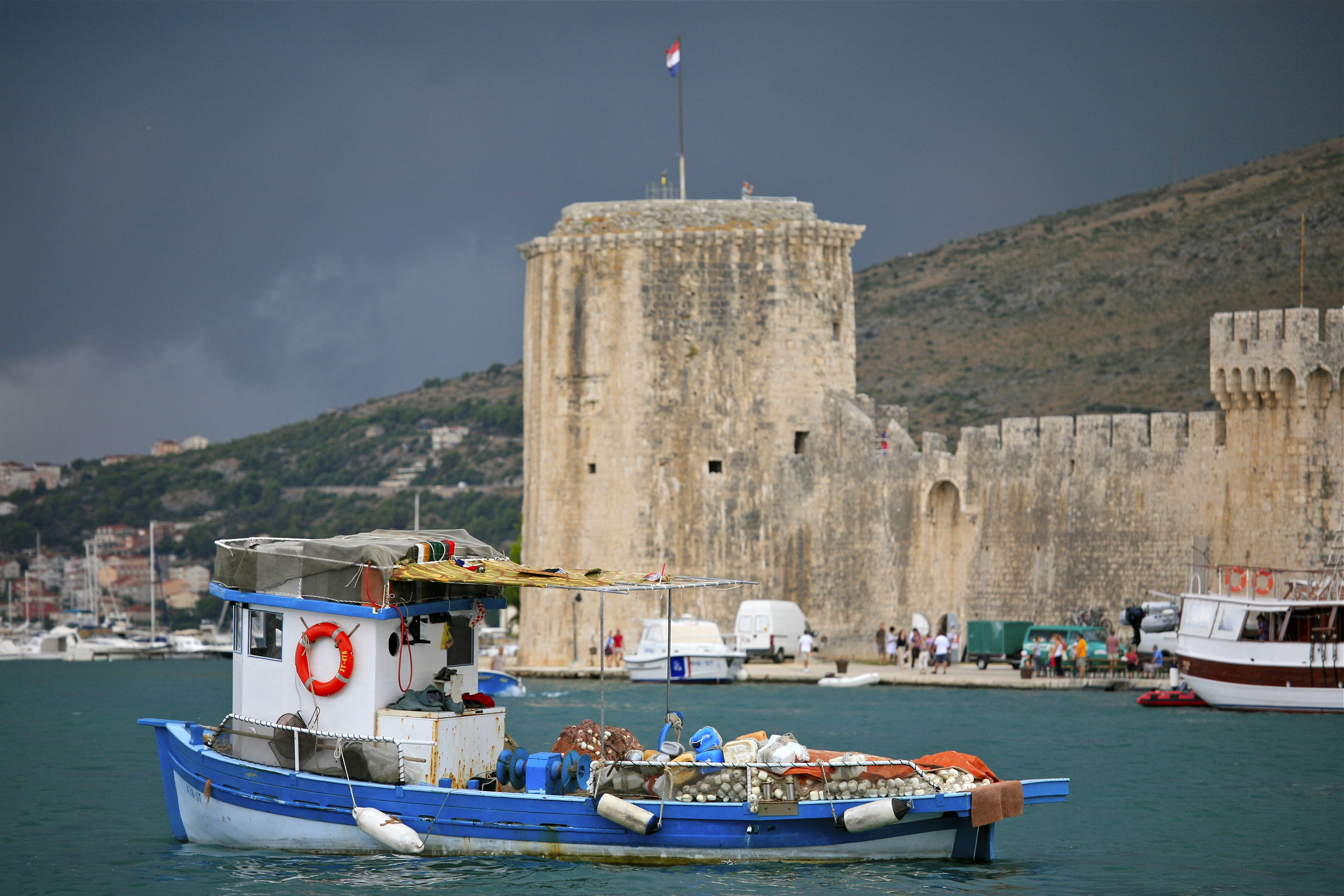
Fishing boat in Trogir, Croatia

In 2007, Croatia's production in live weight reached 53,083 tonnes (52,245 long tons). In 2006, the total Croatian fisheries production volume was 37,800 tonnes (37,200 long tons) of catch and 14,200 tonnes (14,000 long tons) from marine aquaculture. Croatian fisheries employed approximately 20,000. The 2006 marine capture catch in Croatian waters consisted of sardines (44.8%), anchovies (31.3%), tunas (2.7%), other pelagic fish (4.8%), hake (2.4%), mullet (2.1%), other demersal fish (8.3%), crustaceans (largely lobster and Nephrops norvegicus) (0.8%), shellfish (largely oysters and mussels) (0.3%), cuttlefish (0.6%), squids (0.2%) and octopuses and other cephalopods (1.6%). Croatian marine aquaculture production consisted of tuna (47.2%), oysters and mussels (28.2% combined) and bass and bream (24.6% combined).

In 2007, Albanian fisheries production amounted to 7,505 tonnes (7,386 long tons), including aquaculture production, which reached 1,970 tonnes (1,940 long tons) in 2006. At the same time, Slovenian fisheries produced a total of 2,500 tonnes (2,460 long tons) with 55% of the production volume originating in aquaculture, representing the highest ratio in the Adriatic. Finally, the Montenegrin fisheries production stood at 911 tonnes (897 long tons) in 2006, with only 11 tonnes coming from aquaculture. In 2007, the fisheries production in Bosnia–Herzegovina reached volume of 9,625 and 2,463 tonnes (9,473 and 2,424 long tons) in Slovenia.

=== Tourism ===
The countries bordering the Adriatic Sea are significant tourist destinations. The largest number of tourist overnight stays and the most numerous tourist accommodation facilities are recorded in Italy, especially in the Veneto region (around Venice). Veneto is followed by the Emilia-Romagna region and by the Adriatic Croatian counties. The Croatian tourist facilities are further augmented by 21,000 nautical ports and moorings; nautical tourists are attracted to various types of marine protected areas.

All countries along the Adriatic coast, except Albania and Bosnia–Herzegovina, take part in the Blue Flag beach certification programme (of the Foundation for Environmental Education), for beaches and marinas meeting strict quality standards including environmental protection, water quality, safety and services criteria. As of January 2012, the Blue Flag has been awarded to 103 Italian Adriatic beaches and 29 marinas, 116 Croatian beaches and 19 marinas, 7 Slovenian beaches and 2 marinas, and 16 Montenegrin beaches. Adriatic tourism is a significant source of income for these countries, especially in Croatia and Montenegro where the tourism income generated along the Adriatic coast represents the bulk of such income. The direct contribution of travel and tourism to Croatia's GDP stood at 5.1% in 2011, with the total industry contribution estimated at 12.8% of the national GDP. For Montenegro, the direct contribution of tourism to the national GDP is 8.1%, with the total contribution to the economy at 17.2% of Montenegrin GDP. Tourism in Adriatic Croatia has recently exhibited greater growth than in the other regions around the Adriatic.

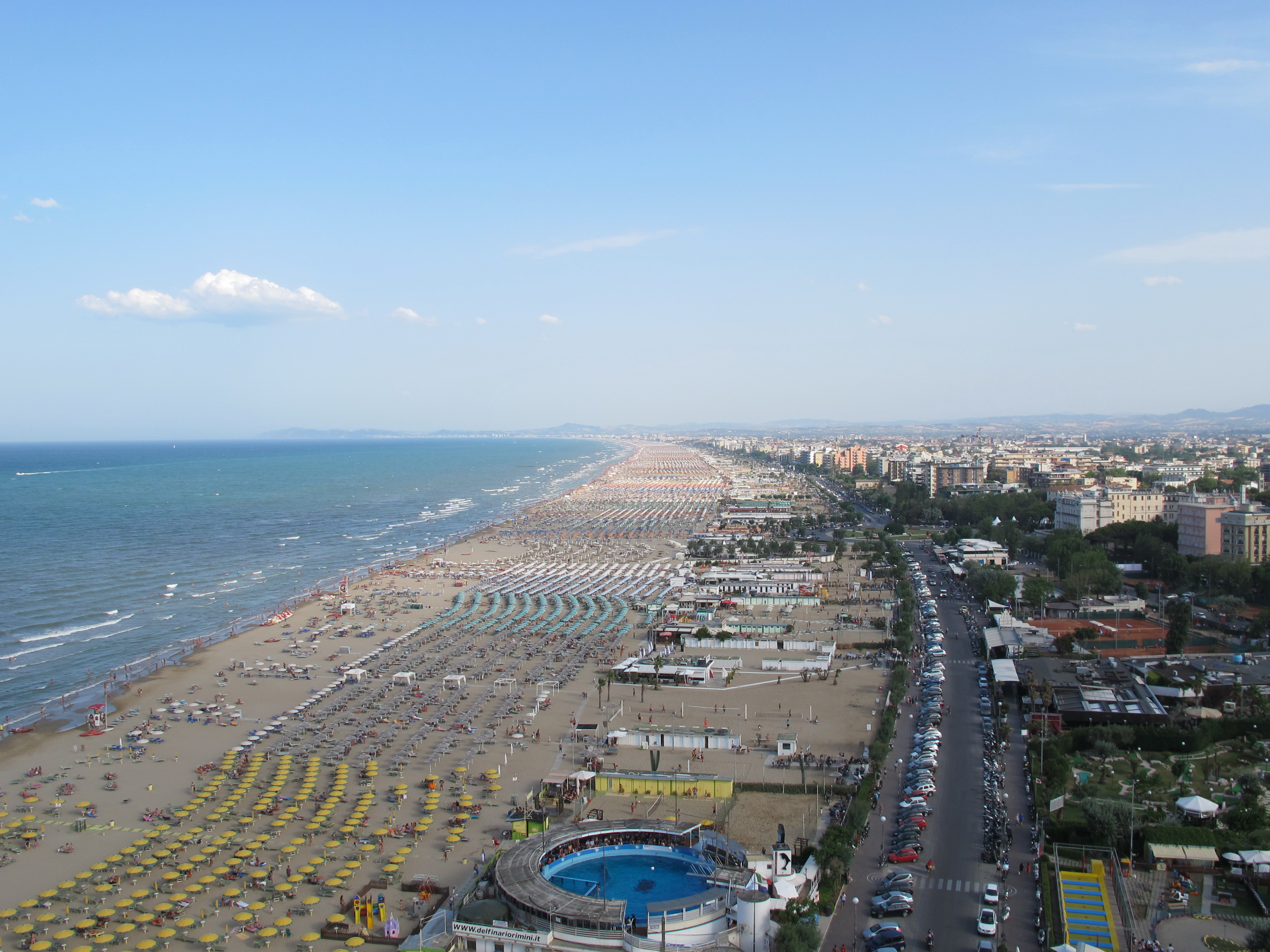
Rimini is a major seaside tourist resort in Italy.

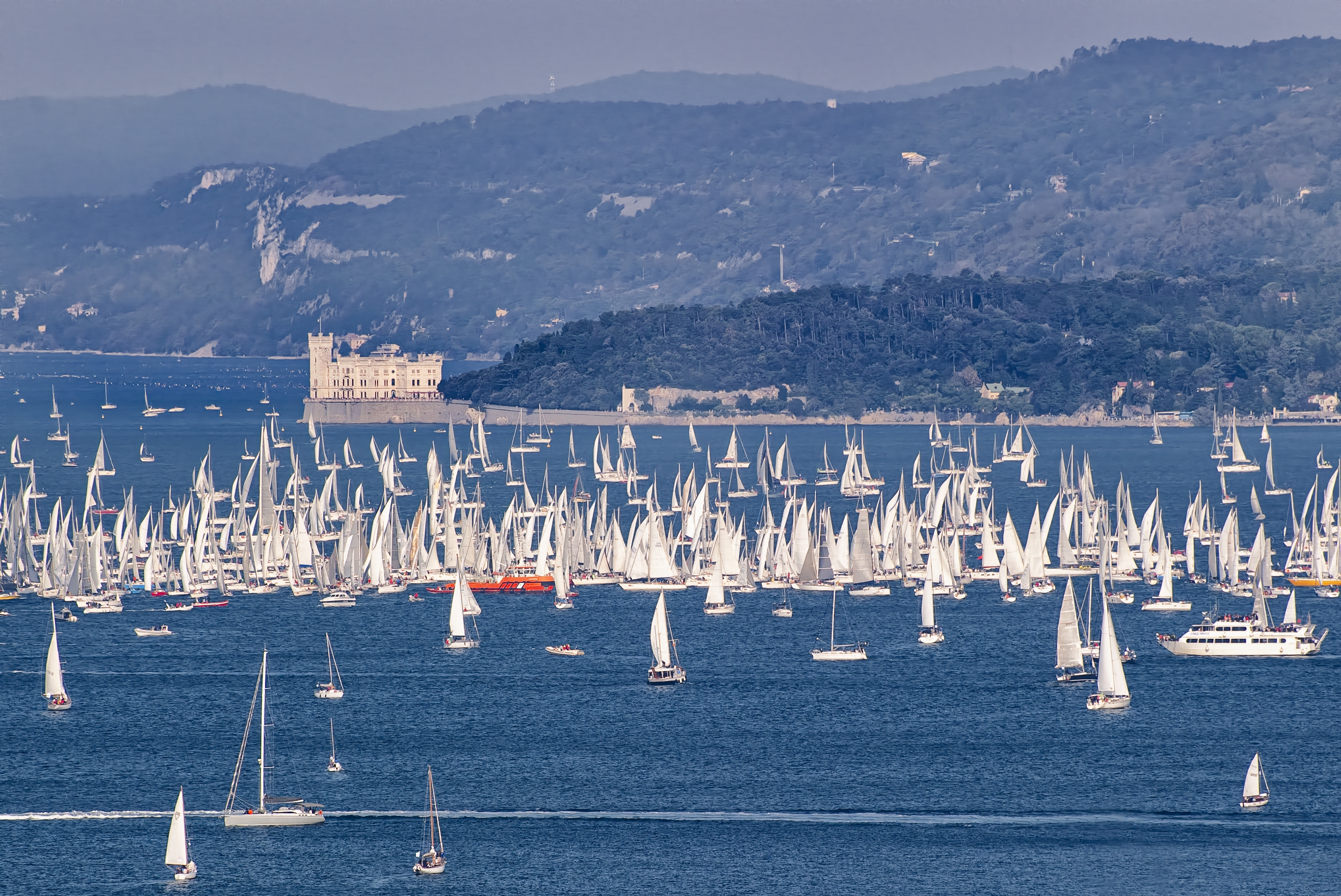
The Barcolana regatta in Trieste, Italy, was named "the greatest sailing race" by the Guinness World Record for its 2,689 boats and over 16,000 sailors on the starting line.

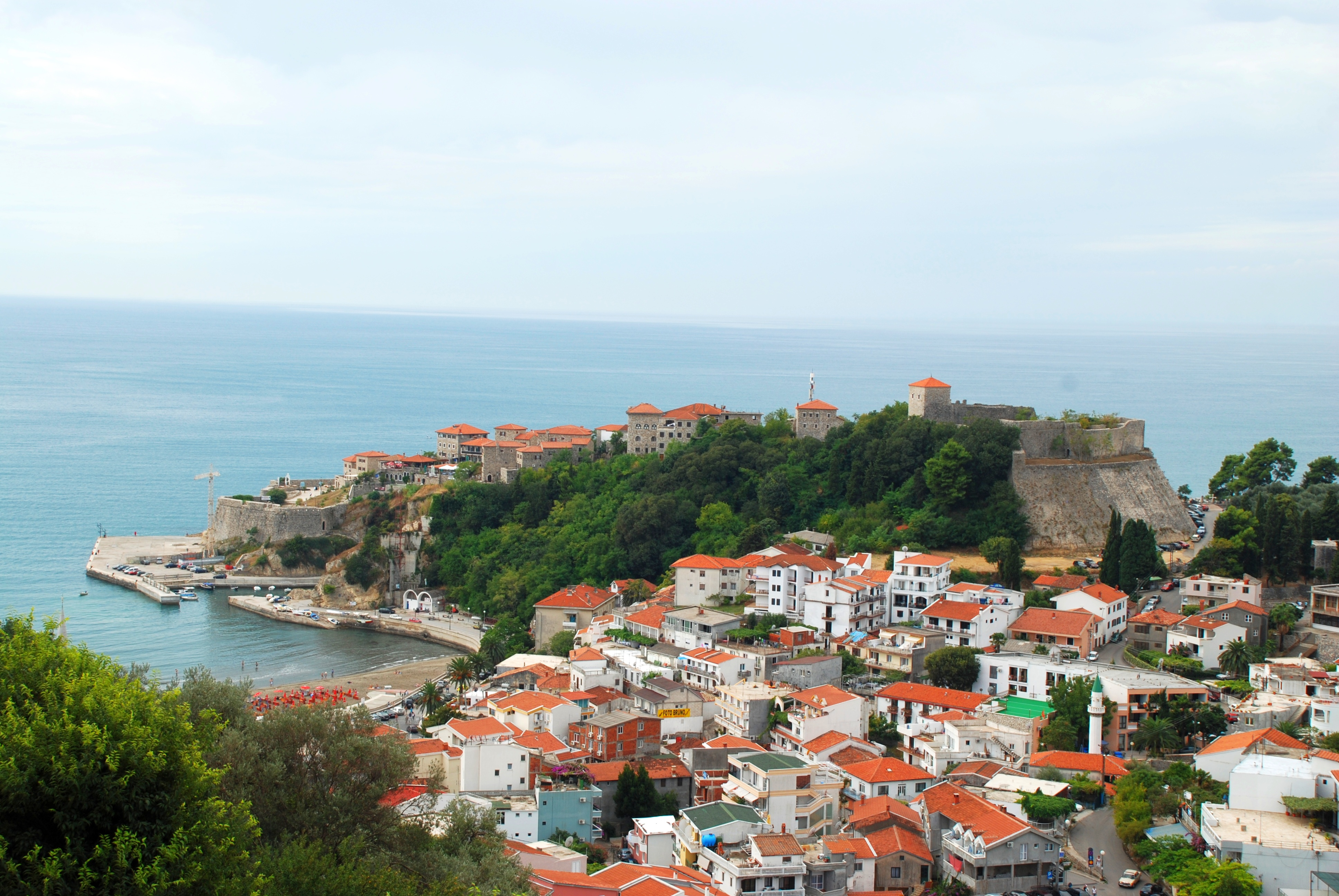
View of Ulcinj, Montenegro

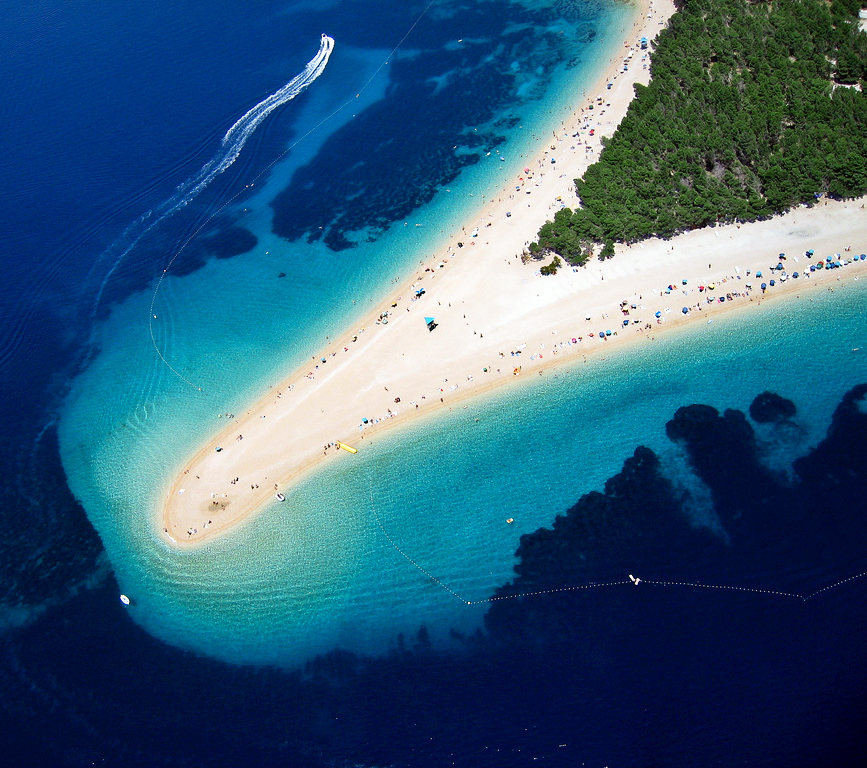
The Zlatni Rat (Golden Cape) on the island of Brač

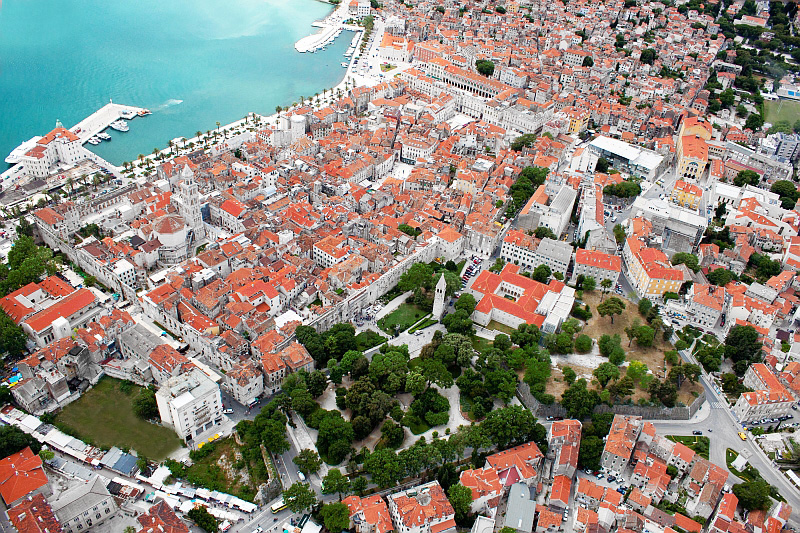
The Palace of the Emperor Diocletian in Split

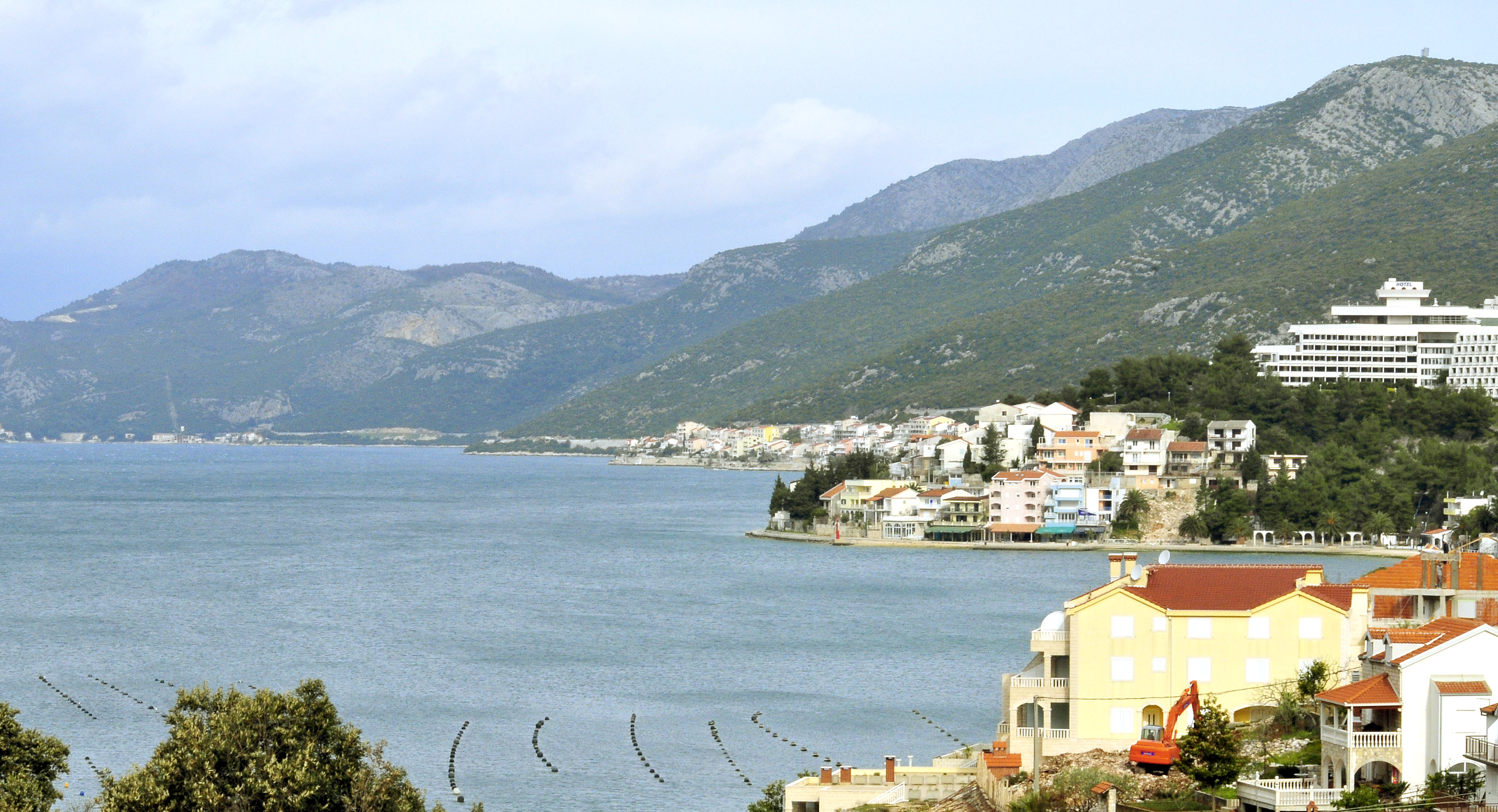
The coast of Neum, the only town to be situated along Bosnia and Herzegovina's 20 km (12 mi) of coastline

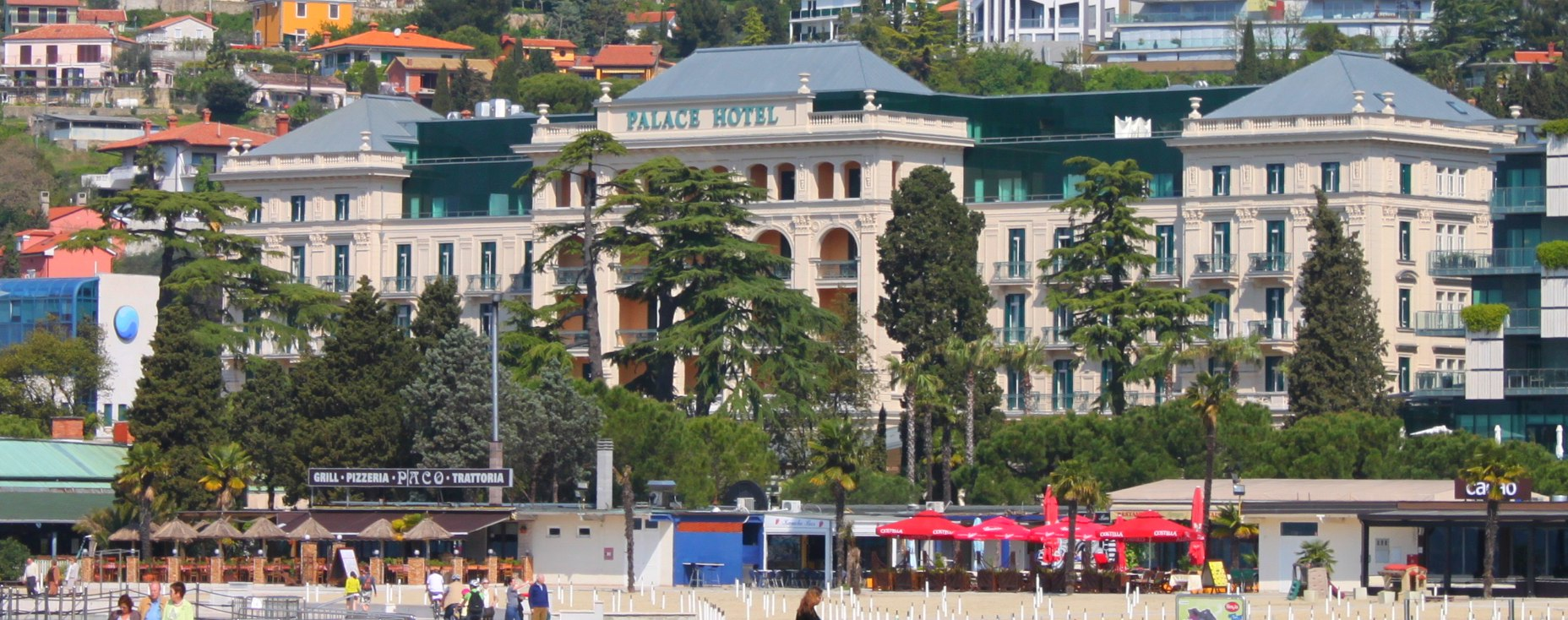
Portorož is the largest seaside tourist centre in Slovenia.

Tourism in the Adriatic Sea area
Country	Region	CAF beds*	Hotel beds	Overnight Stays
Albania	—N/a	?	?	2,302,899
Bosnia and Herzegovina	Neum municipality	c. 6,000	1,810	280,000
Croatia	Adriatic Croatia	1,028,793	119,042	67,231,198
Italy	Friuli-Venezia Giulia	152,847	40,921	8,656,077
Italy	Veneto	692,987	209,700	60,820,308
Italy	Emilia-Romagna	440,999	298,332	37,477,880
Italy	Marche	193,965	66,921	10,728,507
Italy	Abruzzo	108,747	50,987	33,716,112
Italy	Molise	11,711	6,383	7,306,951
Italy	Apulia**	238,972	90,618	12,982,987
Montenegro	—N/a	40,427	25,916	7,964,893
Slovenia	Seaside municipalities	24,080	9,330	1,981,141
*Beds in all collective accommodation facilities; includes "Hotel beds" figure also shown separately **Includes both Adriatic and Ionian sea coasts

=== Transport ===
There are nineteen Adriatic Sea ports (in four different countries) that each handles more than a million tonnes of cargo per year. The largest cargo ports among them are the Port of Trieste (the largest Adriatic cargo port in Italy), the Port of Venice, the Port of Ravenna, the Port of Koper (the largest Slovenian port), the Port of Rijeka (the largest Croatian cargo port), and the Port of Brindisi.

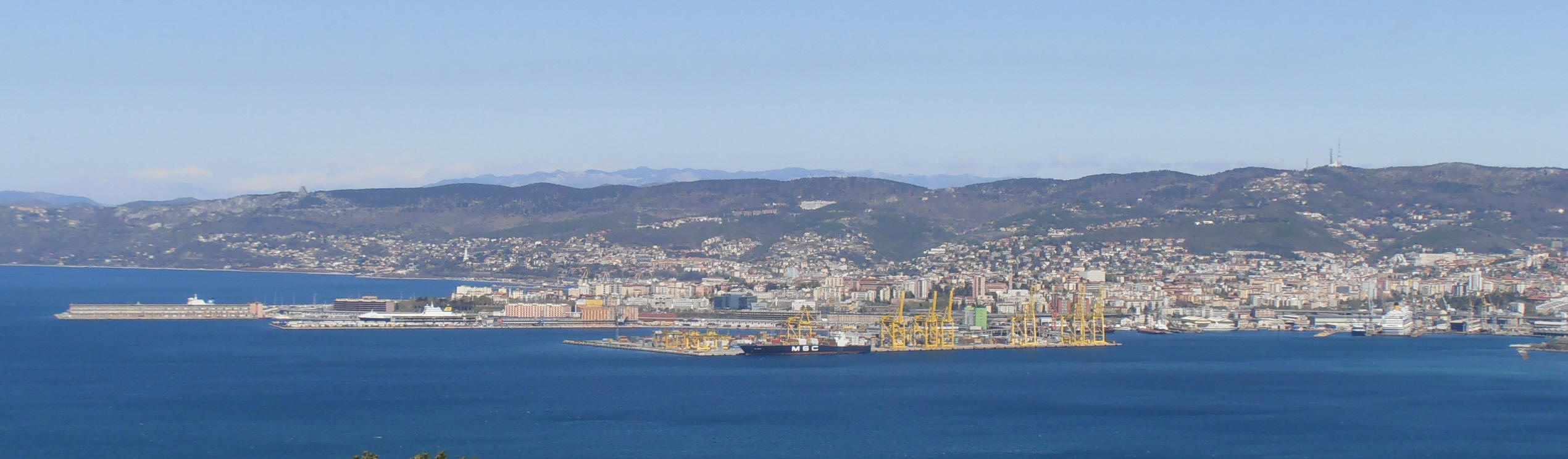
Port of Trieste, the largest cargo port in the Adriatic

The largest passenger ports in the Adriatic are the Port of Split (the largest Croatian passenger port) and ports in Ancona (the largest Italian passenger seaport in the Adriatic). The largest seaport in Montenegro is the Port of Bar. In 2010, the Northern Adriatic seaports of Trieste, Venice, Ravenna, Koper and Rijeka founded the North Adriatic Ports Association to position themselves more favourably in the EU's transport systems.

The port of Trieste is of particular importance for Central Europe because this is where the Transalpine Pipeline begins, supplying 100 percent of southern Germany, 90 percent of Austria and 50 percent of the Czech Republic with crude oil.

Major Adriatic ports*, annual transport volume
Port	Country, Region/County	Cargo (tonnes)	Passengers
Ancona	Italy, Marche	10,573,000	1,483,000
Bari	Italy, Apulia	3,197,000	1,392,000
Barletta	Italy, Apulia	1,390,000	—N/a
Brindisi	Italy, Apulia	10,708,000	469,000
Chioggia	Italy, Veneto	2,990,000	—N/a
Durrës	Albania, Durrës	3,441,000	770,000
Koper	Slovenia, Slovenian Istria	18,000,000	100,300
Manfredonia	Italy, Apulia	1,277,000	—N/a
Monfalcone	Italy, Friuli-Venezia Giulia	4,544,000	—N/a
Ortona	Italy, Abruzzo	1,340,000	—N/a
Ploče	Croatia, Dubrovnik-Neretva	5,104,000	146,000
Porto Nogaro	Italy, Friuli-Venezia Giulia	1,475,000	—N/a
Rabac	Croatia, Istria	1,090,000	669,000
Ravenna	Italy, Emilia-Romagna	27,008,000	—N/a
Rijeka	Croatia, Primorje-Gorski Kotar	15,441,000	219,800
Split	Croatia, Split-Dalmatia	2,745,000	3,979,000
Trieste	Italy, Friuli-Venezia Giulia	39,833,000	—N/a
Venice	Italy, Veneto	32,042,000	1,097,000
*Ports handling more than a million tonnes of cargo or serving more than a million passengers per year Sources: National Institute of Statistics (2007 data, Italian ports, note: the Port of Ancona includes Ancona and Falconara Marittima; passenger traffic below 200,000 is not reported), Croatian Bureau of Statistics (2008 data, Croatian ports, note: the Port of Rijeka includes the Rijeka, Bakar, Bršica and Omišalj terminals; the Port of Ploče includes the Ploče and Metković terminals), Durrës' Chamber of Commerce and Industry – Albania (2007 data, Port of Durrës), SEOnet (2011 data, Port of Koper)

=== Oil and gas ===
Natural gas is produced through several projects, including a joint venture of the Eni and INA companies that operates two platforms—one is in Croatian waters and draws gas from six wells, and the other (which started operating in 2010) is located in Italian waters. The Adriatic gas fields were discovered in the 1970s, but their development commenced in 1996. In 2008, INA produced 14.58 million BOE per day of gas. About 100 offshore platforms are located in the Emilia-Romagna region, along with 17 in the Northern Adriatic. Eni estimated its concessions in the Adriatic Sea to hold at least 40,000,000,000 cubic metres (1.4×10^{12} cu ft) of natural gas, adding that they may even reach 100,000,000,000 cubic metres (3.5×10^{12} cu ft). INA estimates, however, are 50% lower than those supplied by Eni. Oil was discovered in the Northern Adriatic at a depth of approximately 5,400 metres (17,700 ft); the discovery was assessed as not viable because of its location, depth and quality. These gas and oil reserves are part of the Po basin Province of Northern Italy and the Northern Mediterranean Sea.

In the 2000s, investigation works aimed at discovering gas and oil reserves in the Middle and Southern Adriatic basins intensified, and by the decade's end, oil and natural gas reserves were discovered southeast of the Bari, Brindisi—Rovesti and Giove oil discoveries. Surveys indicate reserves of 3 billion barrels of oil in place and 5.7×10^{10} cubic metres (2,000,000,000,000 cu ft) of gas in place. The discovery was followed by further surveys off the Croatian coast. In January 2012, INA commenced prospecting for oil off Dubrovnik, marking the resumption of oil exploration along the eastern Adriatic coast after surveys commenced in the late 1980s around the island of Brač were cancelled because of Yugoslavia's breakup and war in Croatia. Montenegro is also expected to look for oil off its coast. As of January 2012, only 200 exploration wells had been sunk off the Croatian coast, with all but 30 in the Northern Adriatic basin.

== Gallery ==
Ports in the Adriatic

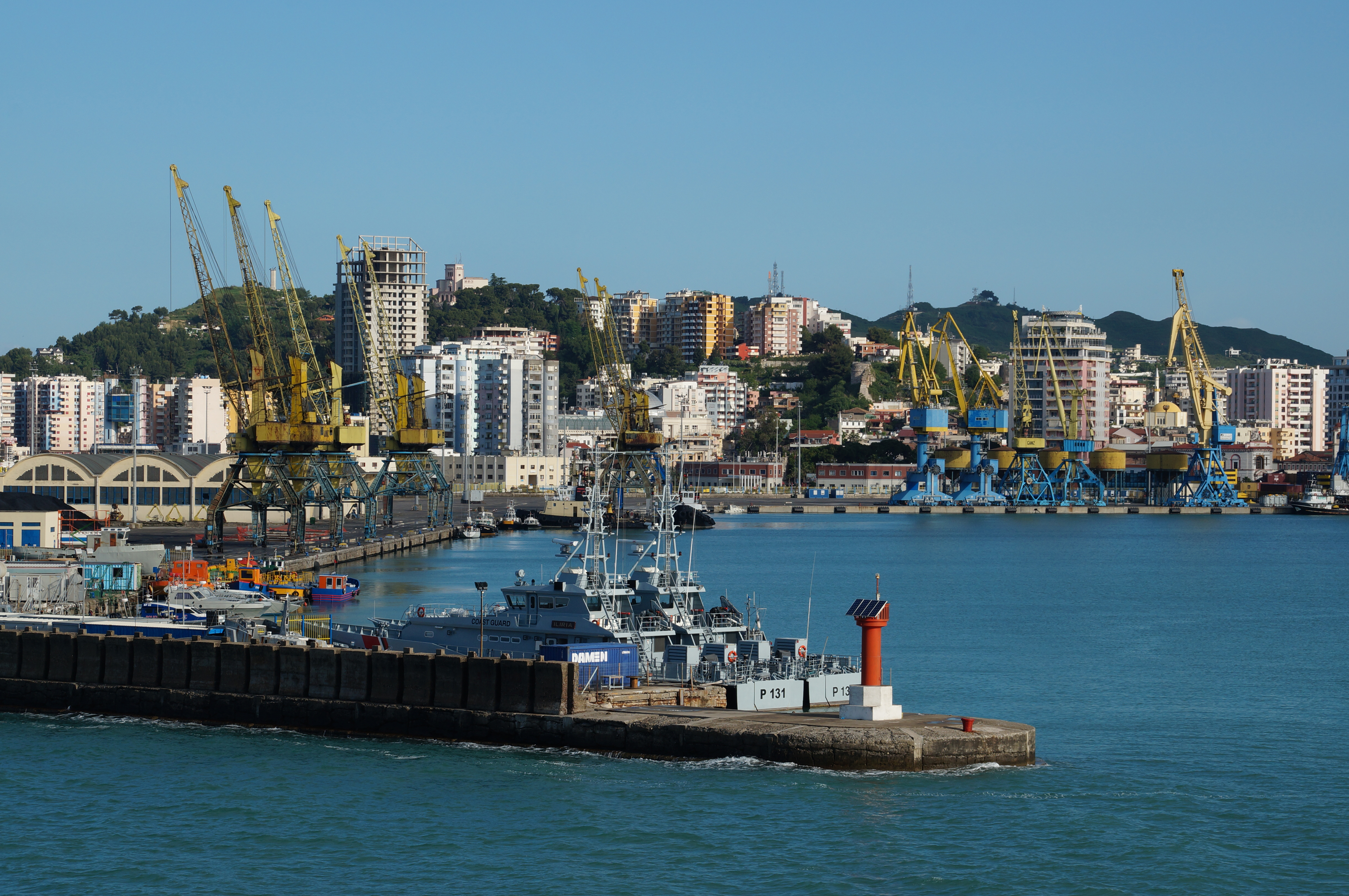
Port of Durrës, the largest port in Albania

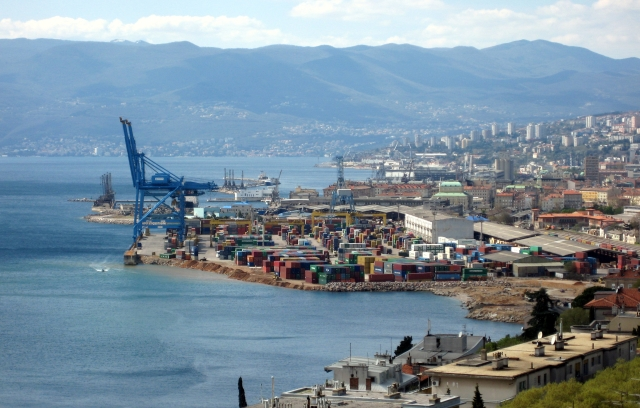
Port of Rijeka, the largest cargo port in Croatia

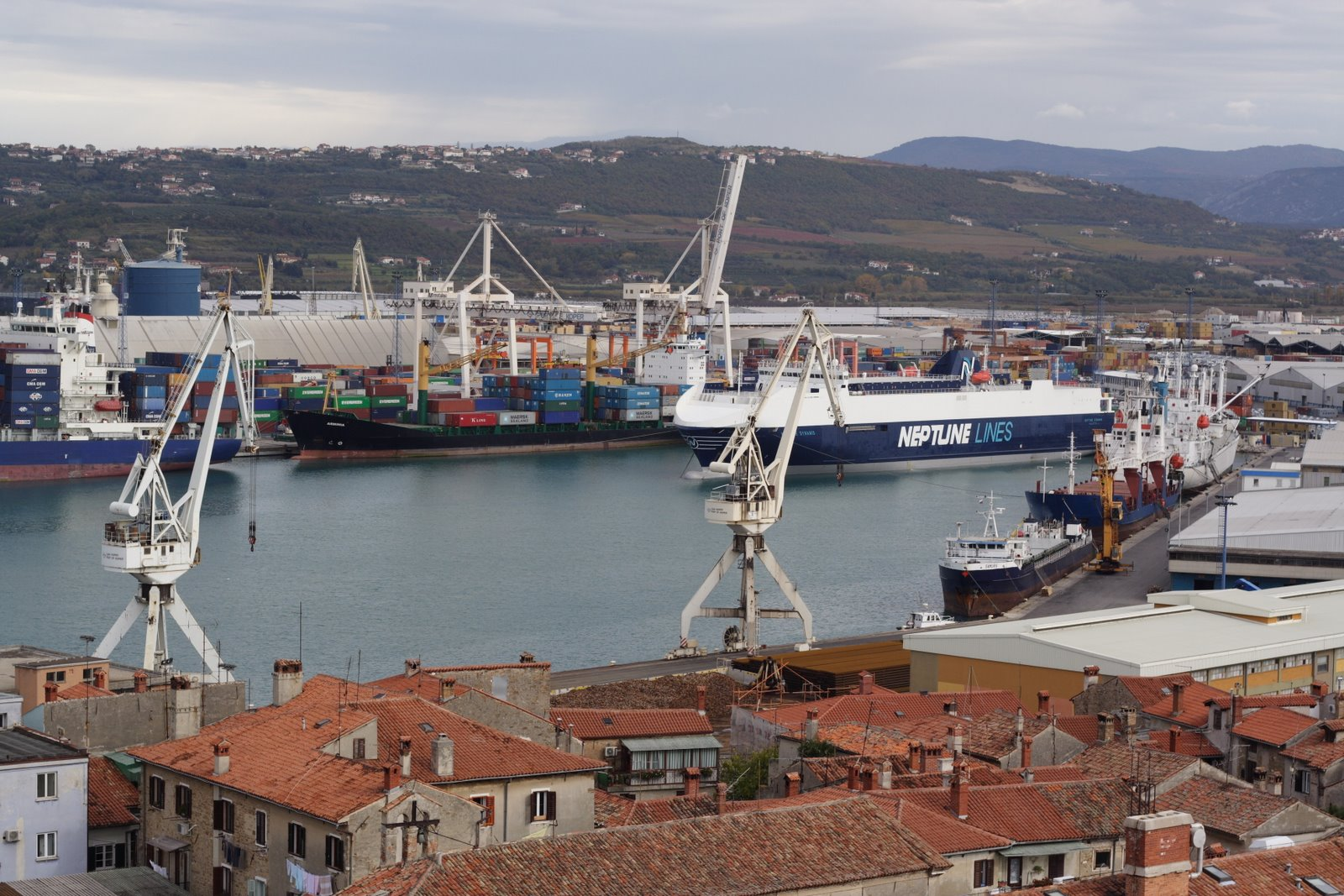
Port of Koper, the largest port in Slovenia

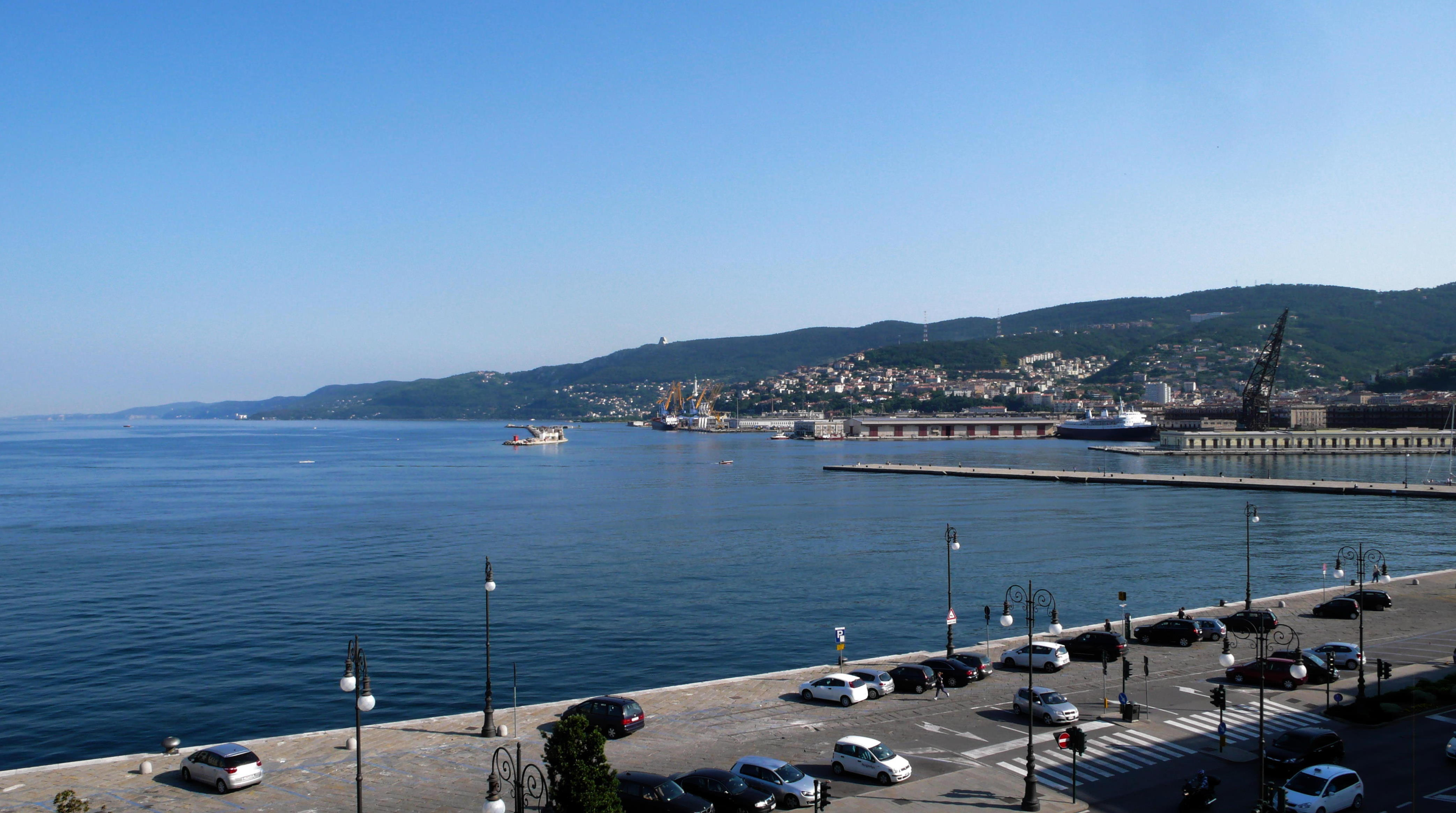
Port of Trieste, the largest cargo port in the Adriatic

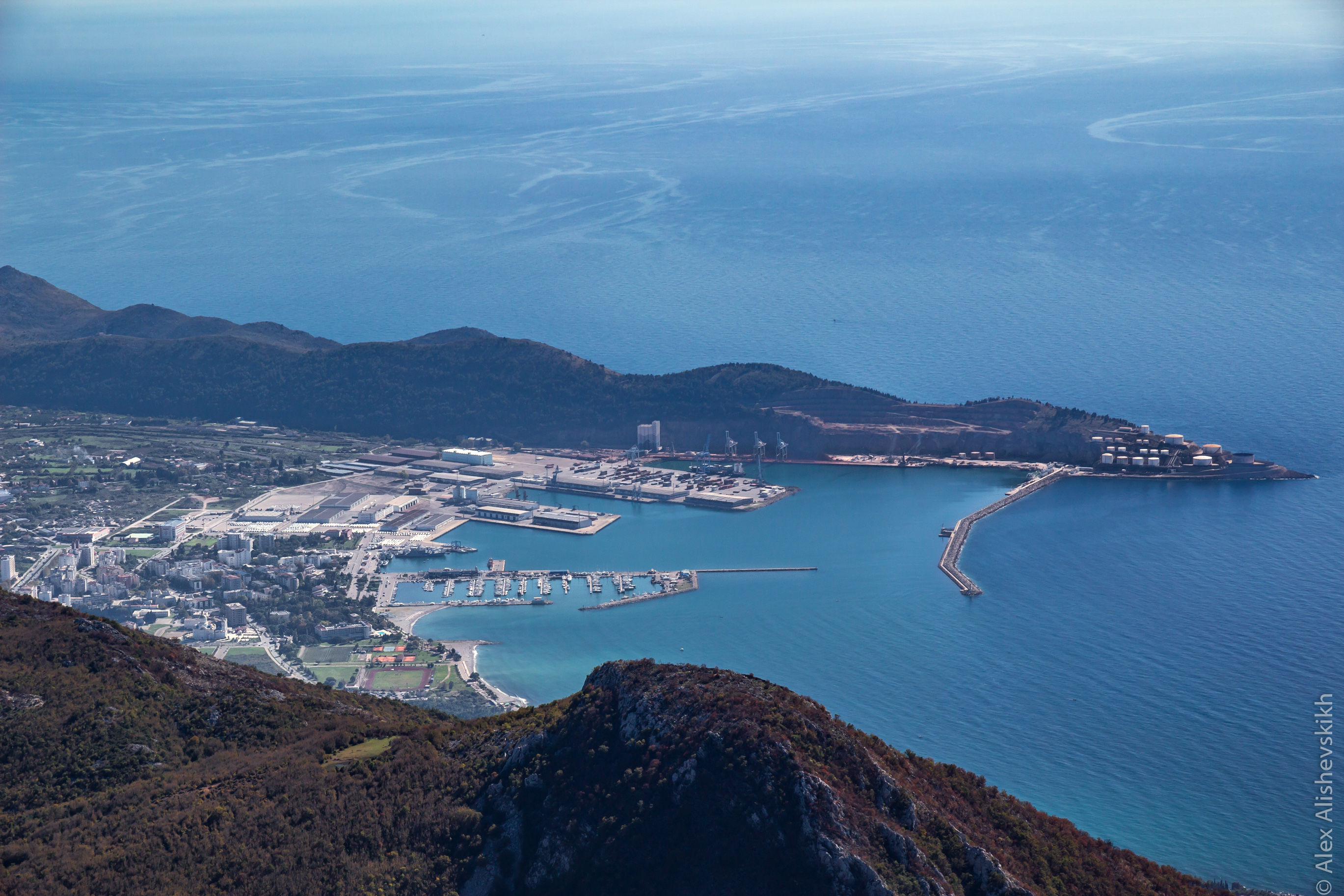
Port of Bar, the largest seaport in Montenegro

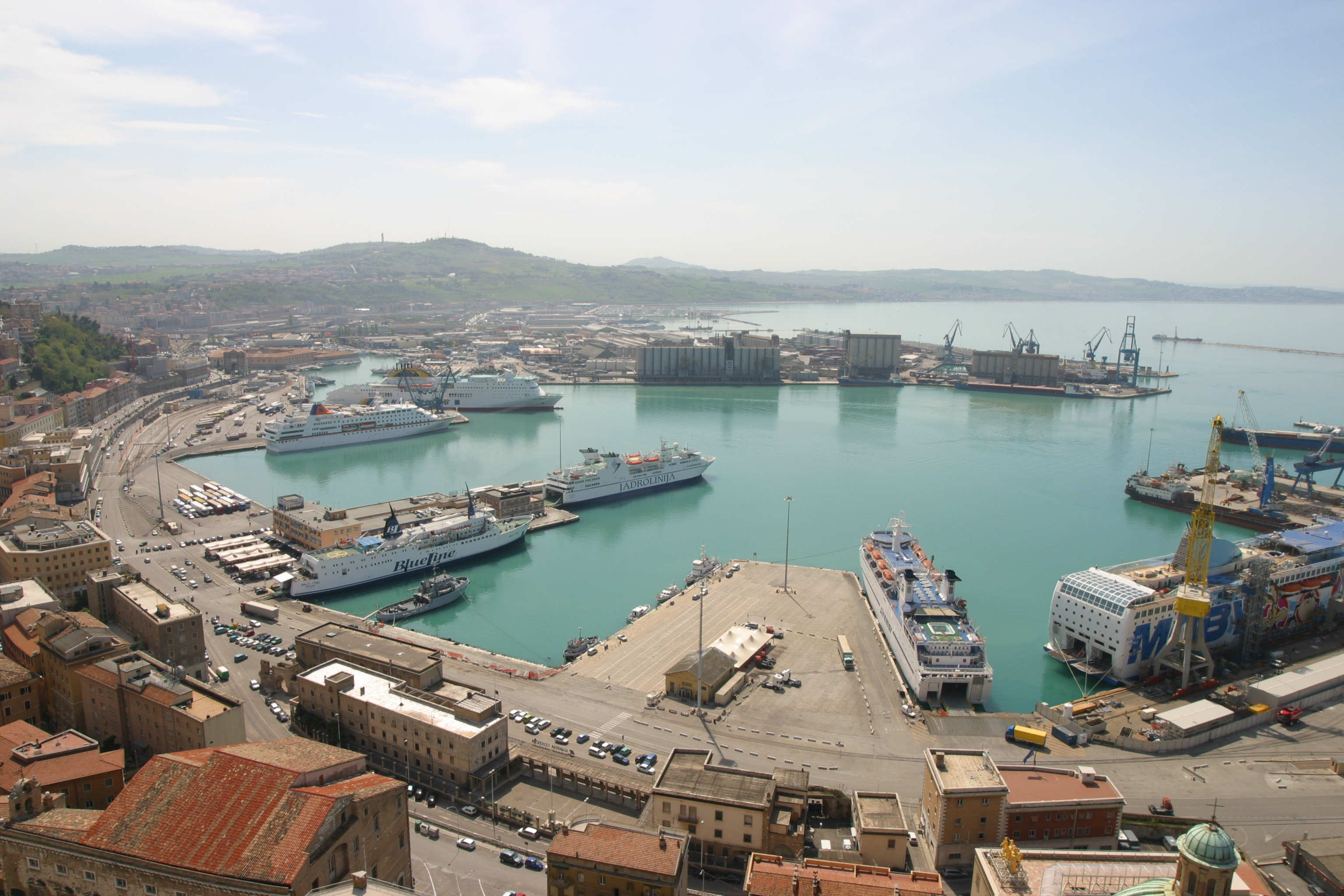
Port of Ancona, a large passenger port

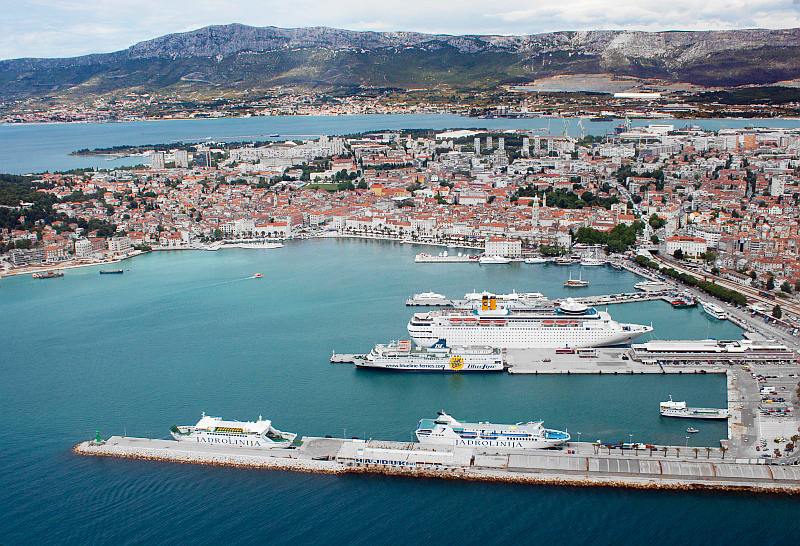
Port of Split, largest passenger port in Croatia

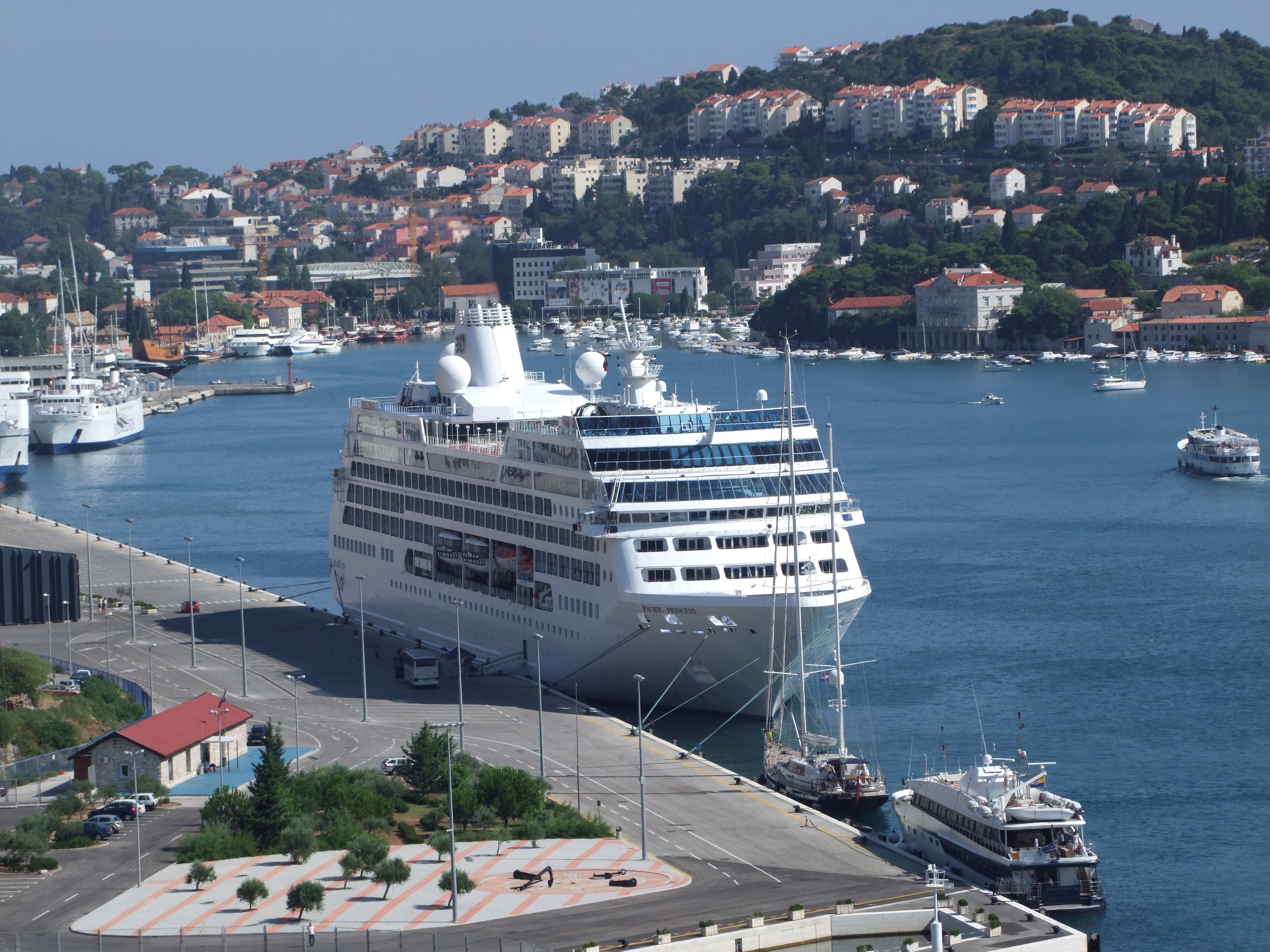
Dubrovnik Port, second largest passenger port in Croatia

== See also ==
- Geography of Albania
- Geography of Bosnia and Herzegovina
- Geography of Croatia
- Geography of Europe
- Geography of Italy
- Geography of Montenegro
- Geography of Slovenia
