= List of container ports =

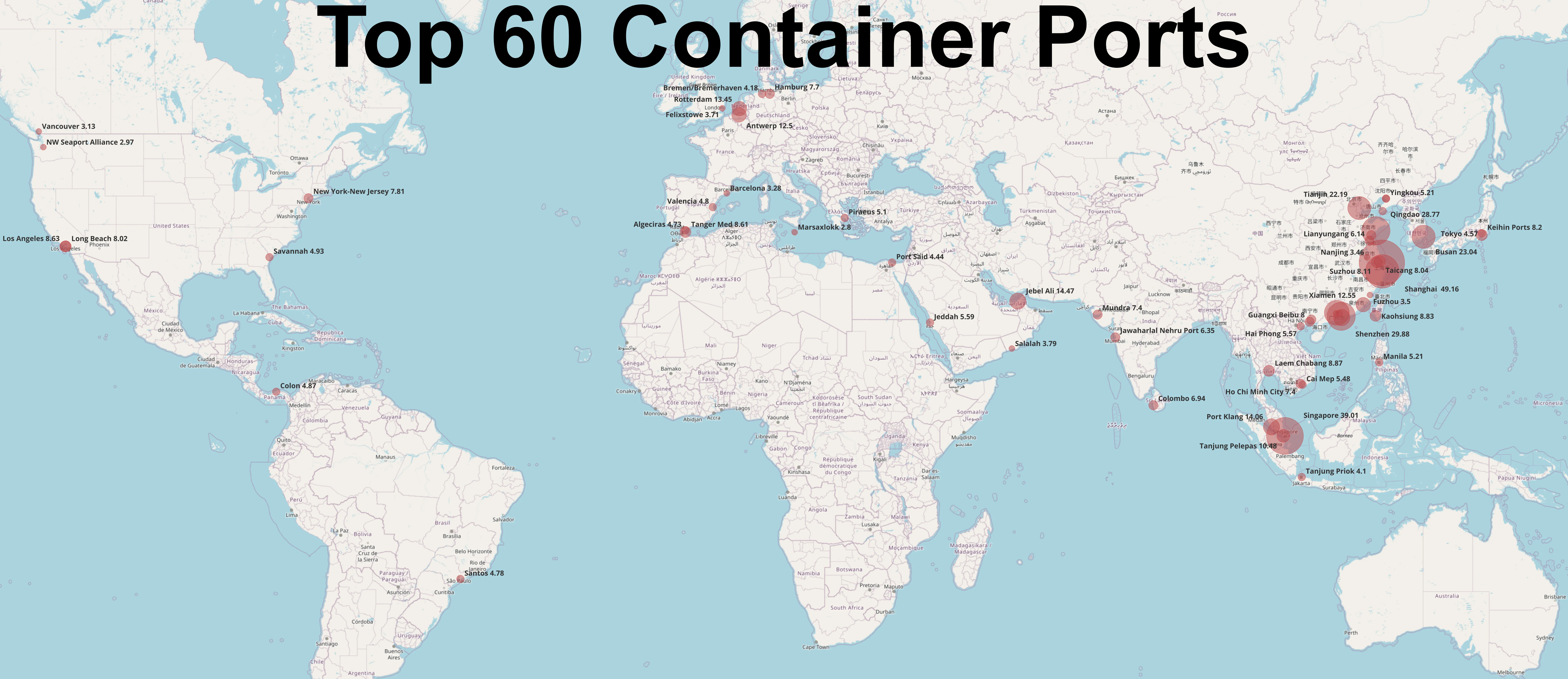
Top 60 container ports

This is a list of maritime container terminals.

== Albania ==
- Port of Durres

== Algeria ==
  - Port of Annaba - 36º 54' 29'' N, 7º 46' 15'' E - UN/LOCODE - DZAAE
  - Port of Bejaia - 36º 45' 0'' N, 5º 4' 34'' E - UN/LOCODE DZBJ
  - Port of Djen Djen - 36º 49' 0'' N, 5º 52' 59'' E - UN/LOCODE DZDJE
  - Port of Djazair - 36º 47' 9'' N, 3º 3' 54'' E - UN/LOCODE DZALG
  - Port of Ghazaouet - 35º 6' 0'' N, -1º -52' 0'' W - UN/LOCODE DZGHZ
  - Port of Oran - 35º 43' 0'' N, 0º -38' -59'' W - UN/LOCODE DZORN
  - Port of Skikda - 36º 53' 5'' N, 6º 53' 22'' E - UN/LOCODE - DZSKI

== American Samoa ==
- Pago Pago Harbor

== Angola ==
- Port of Amboim (Porto Amboim)
- Port of Cabinda
- Port of Lobito
- Port of Luanda
- Port of Namibe
- Port of Soyo

== Antigua and Barbuda ==
- St John's

== Argentina ==
- Port of Buenos Aires
- Port of Dock Sud
- Ports of Bahia Blanca
- Port of La Plata
- Port of Quequen
- Port of Santa Fe

== Australia ==
- Fremantle Harbour
- Port Adelaide
- Port Botany, Sydney
- Port Darwin
- Port of Brisbane
- Port of Melbourne
- Webb Dock, Melbourne

== Azerbaijan ==
- Port of Baku

== The Bahamas ==
- Freeport Container Port
- Nassau Container Port

== Bangladesh ==
- Port of Chittagong
- Port of Mongla

== Belgium ==
- Port of Antwerp
- Port of Zeebrugge

== Barbados ==
- Port of Bridgetown

== Brazil ==
- Port of Santos
- Port of Centro
- Port of Paranaguá
- Port of Sepetiba
- Port of Rio de Janeiro
- Port of Salvador
- Port of Vitoria

== Canada ==
- Port of Montreal
- Port Metro Vancouver
- Port of Prince Rupert
- Port of Saint John
- Port of Halifax
- Port of Nanaimo

== Chile ==
- Port of Valparaiso
- Port of Antofagasta
- Port of Iquique
- Port of Arica, Arica
- Port of Talcahuano
- Port of San Antonio
- Port of Lirquen
- Port of Coronel

== China ==
- Port of Dalian
- Port of Foshan
- Port of Guangzhou
- Port of Hong Kong
- Port of Lianyungang
- Port of Ningbo
- Port of Qingdao
- Port of Shanghai
- Port of Shenzhen
- Port of Suzhou
- Port of Tianjin
- Port of Xiamen
- Port of Yantai
- Port of Yingkou

== Croatia ==
- Port of Ploče
- Port of Rijeka
  - Adriatic Gate Container Terminal
  - Rijeka Gateway
- Port of Split

== Colombia ==
- Port of Barranquilla, Cartagena
- Port of Buenaventura
- Port of Santa Marta

== Cuba ==
- Havana Harbor

== Cyprus ==
- Port of Limassol

== Denmark ==
- Aarhus
- Copenhagen Malmö Port
- Fredericia
- Kalundborg
- Aalborg

== Djibouti ==
- Port of Djibouti

== Dominican Republic ==
- Multimodal Caucedo Port
- Port of Rio Haina (Haina Occidental Port)

== Egypt ==
- Port Said
  - West Port
  - East Terminal
- Sokhna
- Alexandria Port
- El-Dekhila
- Damietta

== Estonia ==
- Port of Muuga
- Port of Tallinn

== Finland ==
- Port of Hamina-Kotka
- Port of Helsinki
- Port of Pori
- Port of Rauma

== France ==
- Port of Le Havre
- Marseille-Fos Port
- Port of Dunkirk, Dunkirk
- Nantes – Saint Nazaire Port
- Cayenne (French Guiana)

== Germany ==
- Port of Bremen/Bremerhaven
- Port of Germersheim
- Port of Hamburg
- Lübeck Hafen-Gesellschaft
- Rheinhafengesellschaft Weil am Rhein mbH
- Wilhelmshaven/Jade Weser Port

== Greece ==
- Port of Piraeus, Athens
- Port of Thessaloniki
- Port of Volos
- Port of Alexandroupoli
- Port of Heraklion
- Port of Kavala

== Haiti ==
- Port of Port-au-Prince
- Port international du Cap-Haïtien
- Port Lafiteau

== India ==
- Port of Chennai
- Port of Kollam
- Port of Nhava Sheva (Jawaharlal Nehru Port)
- Port of New Mangalore
- Port of Mundra
- Port of Visakhapatnam
- Port of Vizhinjam (Vizhinjam International Seaport)
- Port of Kolkata (Syama Prasad Mookerjee Port)
- Port of Haldia
- Port of Kakinada
- Port of Kamarajar
- Port of Hazira
- Port of Pipavav
- Port of Krishnapatnam
- Port of Kochi
- Port of Tuticorin (V. O. Chidambaranar Port)

== Indonesia ==
- Port of Cirebon, Cirebon
- Port of Tanjung Priok, Jakarta
- Port of Belawan, Medan
- Port of Makassar, Makassar
- Dwikora Harbour, Pontianak
- Port of Trisakti, Banjarmasin
- Port of Tanjung Perak, Surabaya
- Port of Tanjung Mas, Semarang
- Semayang Harbor, Balikpapan
- Tenau Port, Kupang

== Iran ==
- Port of Bandar-Abbas
- Port of Bandar-kohemini

== Ireland ==
- Dublin Port
- Port of Cork
- Belview Port (Port of Waterford)

== Israel ==
- Port of Haifa
- Port of Ashdod
- Port of Eilat

== Italy ==
- Port of Genoa
- Port of Gioia Tauro
- Port of La Spezia
- Port of Trieste
- Port of Augusta
- Port of Marghera
- Port of Taranto
- Port of Palermo
- Port of Naples
- Port of Salerno
- Port of Livorno/Leghorn
- Port of Civitavecchia
- Port of Bari

== Jamaica ==
- Kingston Container Terminal (Port of Kingston), Kingston

== Japan ==
- Port of Nagoya
- Port of Tokyo
- Port of Yokohama
- Port of Osaka
- Port of Kobe
- Port of Fukuyama
- Port of Hiroshima
- Port of Fukuoka

== Jordan ==
- Port of Aqaba

== Kenya ==
- Port of Mombasa

== Latvia ==
- Freeport of Riga

== Lebanon ==
- Port of Beirut
- Port of Tripoli

== Lithuania ==
- Port of Klaipėda

== Madagascar ==
- Toamasina Autonomous Port

== Malaysia ==
- Penang Port
- Port Klang
- Port of Tanjung Pelepas
- Sapangar Container Port

== Malta ==
- Malta Freeport, Birzebbuga
- Port of Valletta

== Mexico ==
- Port of Veracruz
- Port of Lázaro Cárdenas
- Port of Manzanillo
- Port of Altamira
- Port of Ensenada
- Port of Mazatlan
- Port of Progreso
- Port of Morelos

== Montenegro ==
- Port of Bar

== Morocco ==
- Agadir Port
- Casablanca Port
- Tanger-Med

== Mozambique ==
- Port of Maputo
- Port of Beira
- Port of Nacala

== Netherlands ==
- Port of Amsterdam
- Port of Rotterdam

== New Zealand ==
- Ports of Auckland
- CentrePort Wellington, Wellington Harbour
- Port Nelson
- Lyttelton Port, Lyttlelon
- Port Otago, Port Chalmers, Dunedin
- Port of Tauranga
- Napier Port

== Nigeria ==
- Apapa Port Complex, Lagos
- Tin Can Island Port, Lagos

== Norway ==
- Port of Bergen
- Port of Oslo

== Oman ==
- Port of Salalah
- Muscat
- SOHAR Port

== Pakistan ==
- Karachi Port
- Port Qasim
- Gwader Port
- Qasim International container terminal
- Karachi International container terminal
- Pakistan International Container Terminal
- South Asia Pakistan terminals
- Qasim Freight Station
- PEARL TCDT (First Transit Cargo Container Terminal in Karachi Pakistan)
- PAKISTAN INTERNATIONAL BULK TERMINAL LIMITED

== Panama ==
- Port of Balboa
- Port of Cristóbal, Colón
- Manzanillo International Terminal

== Peru ==
- Port of Callao, Lima
- Port of Ilo
- Port of Matarani

== Philippines ==
- Port of Batangas
- Port of Iloilo
- Port of Manila

== Poland ==
- DCT Gdańsk
- Port of Gdynia

== Portugal ==
- Port of Setúbal, Setubal
- Port of Alcântara, Lisbon
- Port of Leixões, Porto
- Port of Sines, Sines

== Qatar ==
- Port of Hamad

== Romania ==
- Port of Constanţa

== Russia ==
- Vostochny Port, Vrangel
- Port of Saint Petersburg
- Kaliningrad Sea Commercial Port
- Port of Novorossiysk
- Port of Vladivostok, Free port of Vladivostok

== Saudi Arabia ==
- Jeddah Seaport
- King Abdul Aziz Sea Port, Dammam
- Port of Jubail (King Fahad Industrial Port)
- Riyadh Dry Port

== Senegal ==
- Port of Dakar

== Singapore ==
- Port of Singapore

== Slovenia ==
- Port of Koper

== Somaliland ==
- Port of Berbera, DP World Berbera New Port

== South Africa ==
- Port of Durban
- Port of East London
- Port of Port Elizabeth
- Port of Cape Town
- Port of Richards Bay
- Port of Ngqura

== South Korea ==
- Port of Busan
- Port of Incheon

== Spain ==
- Port of Algeciras
- Port of Alicante
- Port of Barcelona
- Port of Bilbao
- Port of Las Palmas
- Port of Tarragona
- Port of Valencia
- Port of Vigo

== Sri Lanka ==
- Port of Colombo

== Sudan ==
- Port of Sudan

== Suriname ==
- Port of Paramaribo

== Sweden ==
- Ports of Stockholm
- Port of Gothenburg
- Copenhagen Malmö Port

== Syria ==
- Port of Latakia
- Port of Tartus

== Taiwan ==
- Port of Kaohsiung
- Port of Taichung
- Port of Keelung

== Tanzania ==
- Port of Dar Es Salaam

== Thailand ==
- Port of Laem Chabang
- Port of Bangkok

== Turkey ==
- Port of Aliağa
- Port of Ambarlı
- Port of Antalya
- Port of Gemlik, Gemlik
- Port of İskenderun
- Port of Istanbul
- Port of İzmir
- Port of Izmit
- Port of Kocaeli
- Port of Mersin
- Port of Samsun
- Port of Tekirdağ
- Port of Yalova

== Ukraine ==
- Port of Odesa

== United Arab Emirates ==
- Port of Dubai
- Fujairah Port
- Port of Khor Fakkan
- Port of Sharjah
- Jebel Ali
- Abu Dhabi

== United Kingdom ==
- Port of Belfast
- Royal Portbury Dock, Bristol
- Port of Felixstowe
- Grangemouth
- Port of Greenock (Clydeport)
- Port of Immingham
- Seaforth Dock, Liverpool
- London Gateway
- Portsmouth
- Port of Southampton
- Teesport
- London Thamesport
- Port of Tilbury, London

== United States ==
- Port of Hueneme, California
- Port of Long Beach, California
- Port of Los Angeles, California
- Port of Oakland, California
- Port of Seattle, Washington
- Port of Tacoma, Washington
- PortMiami, Miami, Florida
- Port Everglades, Florida
- Port of Tampa, Florida
- Port of New Orleans, Louisiana
- Port of Boston, Massachusetts
- Helen Delich Bentley Port of Baltimore, Maryland
- Wilmington Marine Terminal, Delaware
- Port of New York and New Jersey
  - Howland Hook Marine Terminal, Staten Island, New York
  - Port Jersey Marine Terminal, Jersey City, New Jersey
  - Port Newark-Elizabeth Marine Terminal, New Jersey
  - Red Hook Marine Terminal, Brooklyn, New York
- Port of Savannah, Georgia
- Port of Charleston, South Carolina
- Port of Wilmington, North Carolina
- Virginia Port Authority, Virginia
  - APM Terminals, Portsmouth, Virginia
  - Newport News Marine Terminal, Newport News, Virginia
  - Norfolk International Terminals, Norfolk, Virginia
  - Virginia Inland Port, Front Royal, Virginia
- Port of Houston, Texas
  - Bayport Terminal, Houston, Texas
- Port of Galveston, Texas
- Port of Port Lavaca, Texas
- Port of Mobile, Alabama
- Port of Anchorage, Alaska
- Port of Honolulu, Hawaii
- Port of San Juan, Puerto Rico
- Louisiana International Gulf Transfer Terminal Regional Center pre-construction phase

== Uruguay ==
- Port of Montevideo

== Vietnam ==
- Saigon Port (Ho Chi Minh City)
- Hai Phong
- Da Nang

== See also ==
- List of busiest container ports
- List of ports
