= North Adriatic Ports Association =

The North Adriatic Ports Association (NAPA) is an association of five North Adriatic seaports: Port of Koper, Port of Rijeka, Port of Trieste, Port of Venice and Port of Ravenna.

Total throughput of the common branded five NAPA ports was 101.44 million tonnes in 2009 prior to Rijeka joining NAPA. Total 2010 throughput is 120 million tonnes and container throughput is 1.471.908 TEUs

In March 2010, the NAPA was established by port authorities of Trieste, Ravenna, Venice and Koper in Trieste with an aim of asserting position of the ports in respect of the European Union and its transport patterns.

The Port of Rijeka joined the NAPA in November 2010.

The NAPA aims to harmonize information systems and organizational setup of the member ports in order to attract as much shipping to the area as possible.

The project was scheduled to be completed by 2013.

The Port of Ravenna resigned in November 2012 and rejoined in 2017.
