= International Container Terminal Services =

Philippine port management company

International Container Terminal Services, Inc.
- Type: Public company (PSE: ICT)
- Industry: Port operator
- Founded: December 24, 1987 (as International Container Terminal Services Inc.)
- Founder: Enrique Razon Sr.
- Headquarters: Port of Manila, Manila, Philippines
- Number of locations: 32 terminals in 19 countries
- Key people: Enrique K. Razon Jr. (Chairman and President); Christian R. Gonzalez (Executive Vice President)
- Services: Container port establishment Port management Cargo handling Rail freight
- Website: ictsi.com

International Container Terminal Services, Inc. (ICTSI) (PSE: ICT) is a global port management company headquartered in Manila, Philippines. Established in December 1987, ICTSI is the Philippines' largest multinational and transnational company, having established operations in both developed and emerging market economies in Asia Pacific, the Americas, and Europe, the Middle East and Africa. The company is ranked the eighth largest container terminal operator, according to TEU equity volume.

It was the First Philippine Independent Port Operator to provide Marine Cargo Handling through Various shipping companies around the globe. Beginning in December 24, 1987 It was rebranded as International Container Terminal Services Inc. (ICTSI) and was formed by the Soriano Group and the Razon Group along with Sea-Land Services to bid for the privatization of The Manila International Container Terminal in line with the Cory Aquino Administration.

Beginning In May 1988, the Philippine Ports Authority awarded the MICT contract to ICTSI, which started its operations of MICT on June 12, 1988. In March 1992, ICTSI's shares were listed on the Manila and Makati Stock Exchanges (now the Philippine Stock Exchange) following the initial public offering of its shares. In September 1992, ICTSI was ranked alongside San Miguel Corp. and PLDT as one of the best managed companies in the Philippines based on an international survey conducted by the Hong Kong magazine Asia Money & Finance.

ICTSI is an international operator of common user container terminals serving the global container shipping industry. Its business is the acquisition, development, operation and management of container terminals focusing on facilities with total annual throughputs ranging from 50,000 to 3,000,000 twenty-foot equivalent units (TEUs). It also handles break bulk cargoes and provides a number of ancillary services such as storage, container packing and unpacking, inspection, weighing, and services for refrigerated containers or reefers.

ICTSI is an independent port operator with no vested interests in shipping line activity.

== Asia Pacific ==
Manila International Container Terminal, Manila, Philippines

In 1988, ICTSI won in an international tender a 25+25-year concession to manage, operate and develop the Manila International Container Terminal (MICT), ICTSI's flagship operation and the Philippines’ leading international trading gateway. ICTSI's responsibilities include: port management, operations and administration, port development and construction including port planning and programming supply of all equipment, and investment risk.

The MICT is one of the three terminals in the Port of Manila, the core of the Philippine port system. The MICT is located between the North and the South Harbors, protruding westward into the Manila Bay at the mouth of the Pasig River, the city's major waterway. A dedicated container terminal, the MICT mainly handles international containerized cargo. ICTSI also handles bulk cargo at the MICT basin anchorage.

The MICT today is the Philippines' largest international container terminal in terms of volume and capacity, capturing an estimated 65 percent market share in the Port of Manila.

NorthPort, Manila, Philippines

In September 2017, ICTSI signed a Share Purchase Agreement (SPA) with Petron Corporation for the acquisition of 34.83% of the total issued and outstanding shares of Manila North Harbour Port, Inc. (MNHPI). The Company in 2019 further acquired 15.17% of MNHPI from Harbor Center Port Terminal Inc. (HCPTI), increasing ICTSI's stake to 50%. MNHPI holds the 25-year concession contract with the Philippine Ports Authority (PPA) for the development, management, operation and maintenance of Manila North Harbor, the country's premiere domestic port.

Manila Multipurpose Terminal, Manila, Philippines

In June 2021, ICTSI entered into a Share Purchase Agreement (SPA) with Prime Strategic Holdings to buy 100% of Manila Harbor Center Port Services Incorporated (MHCPSI) for P2.45 billion. The terminal is mainly involved in handling and storing international breakbulk and bulk cargo. In 2024, the terminal was rebranded from Manila Harbor Center to Manila Multipurpose Terminal. Since the acquisition, ICTSI has invested in growing the terminal and expanding its cargo-handling and storage capabilities.

Subic Bay International Terminal, Subic Bay Freeport, Olongapo

In 2007, under the Subic Port Development Project, the Subic Bay Metropolitan Authority (SBMA) awarded ICTSI subsidiary Subic Bay International Terminal Corp. (SBITC) the concession for the New Container Terminal (NCT) 1, with commercial operations commencing in 2008. In 2011, under the Subic Port Project's second phase, SBMA awarded ICTSI Subic, Inc. the concession to operate NCT 2. Increasing volumes at the Subic Bay Freeport enabled ICTSI to streamline and interface the operations of NCT 1 and 2. The merged operations are ready to serve an improving local economy in Central and Northern Luzon regions, along with its continued support to facilitate the box market of Metro Manila.

Laguna Gateway Inland Container Terminal, Calamba, Philippines

In March 2015, ICTSI formed Laguna Gateway Inland Container Terminal, a one-stop inland container terminal located in Calamba City, Laguna. LGICT is 60%-owned by IW Cargo Handlers, Inc., a wholly owned subsidiary of the company, and 40% owned by Nippon Container Terminals Co. Ltd., Transnational Diversified Corporation and NYK Fil-Japan Shipping Corp. The country's first dry port, LGICT primarily operates as an extension of the seaport operations of the Manila International Container Terminal (MICT) and is intended to function as a regional logistics hub, supporting operations of exporters and importers in the Laguna, Batangas and Quezon economic zones.

Cavite Gateway Terminal, Tanza, Philippines

In 2018, ICTSI, in partnership with the Philippine Department of Transportation, launched Cavite Gateway Terminal, the country's first and only container barge terminal in Tanza, Cavite. CGT will facilitate off-the-roads seaborn transport of containers between Port of Manila and Cavite and service industrial locators in Cavite area.

Bauan International Port, Batangas, Philippines

ICTSI formed a wholly owned subsidiary, Bauan International Ports, Inc. to develop a 20-hectare multi-purpose, multi-user 20-hectare terminal situated along the protected waters of Batangas Bay in Bauan, Batangas. The Bauan International Port primarily handles ro-ro, project, and containerized cargo. Break bulk and other general cargo are also handled at the terminal.

Visayas Container Terminal, Iloilo City, Philippines

On April 15, 2024, ICTSI took over the operation and development of the Iloilo Commercial Port Complex (ICPC) at the Port of Iloilo under a 25-year concession agreement with the Philippine government, following the approval of the Philippine Ports Authority (PPA). As part of the agreement, the terminal was renamed from the Iloilo Commercial Port Complex to the Visayas Container Terminal (VCT). ICTSI's focus is on rehabilitating the terminal facilities and introducing modern cargo-handling equipment to enhance operations in Central Philippines, capitalizing on its strategic location at the center of the Visayas region.

Makar Wharf, General Santos City, Philippines

In August 1999, ICTSI acquired shares of South Cotabato Integrated Port Services, Inc. (SCIPSI), a stevedoring and cargo service provider at the Makar Wharf in General Santos City, Philippines. In July 2008, ICTSI further purchased shares and now owns 51 percent of SCIPSI. Makar Wharf is a general purpose terminal handling domestic and international containerized, general, and ro-ro cargo, as well as domestic passenger traffic.

Mindanao Container Terminal, Tagoloan, Philippines

In April 2008, the Phividec Industrial Authority awarded ICTSI the concession to operate and manage the Mindanao Container Terminal (MCT) located at Phividec Industrial Estate in Tagoloan, Misamis Oriental. MCT has a 24-hectare terminal area for infrastructures, equipment and support facilities and handles containerized and non-containerized cargo.

Yantai International Container Terminals, Shandong, China

In July 2014, ICTSI took over the operations and management of Yantai International Container Terminals, Ltd. (formerly DP World Yantai Ltd.), a Sino-foreign joint-venture port enterprise between ICTSI, Yantai Port Co., Ltd. and DP World PLC. With road and rail networks linking Shandong province, YICT operates berths handling foreign cargo in the Port of Yantai in the People's Republic of China.

Victoria International Container Terminal, Melbourne, Australia

In May 2014, ICTSI signed a 26-year contract for the design, construction and operations of the Terminal and Empty Container Park (ECP) at Webb Dock East, Port of Melbourne. A fully automated container terminal, VICT is purpose-built to accommodate the larger vessels now being deployed in East Coast Australia container shipping trade lanes.

South Pacific International Container Terminal, Lae, Papua New Guinea

In September 2017, ICTSI signed a 25-year terminal operations agreement with state-owned PNG Ports Corporation Limited for the Port of Lae in Papua New Guinea. SPICT's contract specifically covers the port operations and facilities at the South Pacific International Container Terminal.

Motukea International Terminal, Port Moresby, Papua New Guinea

In September 2017, ICTSI signed a 25-year terminal operations agreement with PNG state-owned PNG Ports Corp. Limited (PNGPCL) for the Port of Motukea. MITL's contract specifically covers the port operations and facilities at the Motukea International Terminal.

Tanjung Priok Jakarta, Indonesia

PT PBM Olah Jasa Andal (OJA) started their commercial operations in 2002, where ICTSI signed a 15-year Cooperation Agreement for Containers Stevedoring Services at the Port of Tanjung Priok, Berths 300-303, located in Tanjung Priok and Koja, sub-districts of North Jakarta. The berths provide the highest stevedoring and cargo-handling operations in Indonesia's largest seaport.

East Java Multipurpose Terminal Lamongan Regency, Indonesia

In August 2022, ICTSI signed a 47-year concession with Indonesia Ministry of Transportation for PT East Java Development. EJMT is in an 80-hectare Shorebase Lamongan complex that consist of four large berths that will expand into a 300m quayline infrastructure. EJMT is on its track record to serving the international oil and gas sector, and will also be supporting development projects on manufacturing raw to processed goods; food and frozen products; steel and other commodities growing in Lamongan.

== The Americas ==
Contecon Manzanillo, Colima, Mexico

In June 2010, ICTSI signed a 34-year concession for the development and operation of the Second Specialized Container Terminal (TEC-II) at the Port of Manzanillo in Mexico.

Puerto Cortes, Cortes, Honduras

In February 2013, ICTSI, through its wholly owned subsidiary Operadora Portuaria Centroamericana (OPC), won the international bid for the design, financing, construction, maintenance, operation, and exploration of Specialized Container and Cargo Terminal in the Republic of Honduras. An important port in Central America, OPC is the only port in the CA-4 region – comprising Guatemala, El Salvador, Honduras and Nicaragua- allowing containers loaded from the Honduran port to arrive at US ports already pre-checked.

Contecon Guayaquil, Guayas, Ecuador

In March 2007, ICTSI was awarded by Autoridad Portuario de Guayaquil (APG) a 20-year operating concession for the Container and Multipurpose Terminals in Guayaquil, Ecuador. Later in 2019, ICTSI's contract was extended for approximately 19 and a half more years to Dec. 31, 2046. In close proximity to export zones, CGSA is the largest multi-purpose terminal within the world's largest banana-exporting port, handling containerized, general and bulk cargo.

Puerto Aguadulce, Buenaventura, Colombia

In July 2007, ICTSI concluded agreements to start the construction and development of a new multi-user container terminal at the Port of Buenaventura in Colombia. In September 2013, ICTSI entered into an agreement with PSA International Pte Ltd. to jointly develop and operate the container terminal and its ancillary facilities. Puerto Aguadulce is a last generation container terminal achieving high standards of productivity and safety in its operations.

TecPlata, Buenos Aires, Argentina

In October 2008, TecPlata S.A. was granted a 30-year concession to build and operate an all-purpose port terminal in the Port of La Plata, Argentina, by the Consorcio de Gestion del Puerto La Plata, which would expire in 2038. Built with an investment of US$450 million, TecPlata is Argentina's most modern container terminal with an initial capacity of 450,000 twenty-foot equivalent units (TEU) capacity, and capable of being extended to 900,000 TEUs in the second phase.

Tecon Suape, Pernambuco, Brazil

In April 2001, ICTSI, won the bid to develop, construct and manage the operations of the Suape Container Terminal in Pernambuco, Brazil under a 30-year concession. ICTSI operates a wholly owned subdiary, TSSA B.V. The terminal serves the agricultural and industrial sectors in the northern and northeastern parts of Brazil with its direct access to major road networks.

Rio Brasil Terminal, Rio de Janeiro, Brazil

In 2019, ICTSI, through its wholly owned subsidiary ICTSI Americas B.V, signed a Share Purchase Agreement with Boreal Empreendimentos e Participações S.A. (Boreal) to fully acquire the shares of Libra Terminal Rio S.A. (Libra Rio), which holds the concession rights to operate, manage and develop the container terminal Terminal de Contêineres 1 in the port of Rio de Janeiro City, Federative Republic of Brazil. Following ICTSI's takeover, Libra Terminal Rio has been rebranded as ICTSI Rio Brasil 1.

iTracker, Rio de Janeiro and Barra Mansa, Brazil

IRB Logistica Ltda. (iTracker Logistica Inteligente) is set to provide eco-efficient solutions to Port of Rio de Janeiro users a full intermodal logistics provider with: empty container depot, export container freight station, general warehousing, distribution center, and railway transportation. They started their commercial operations in 2022 to serve the surrounding expanse of import-export hubs.

== Europe, Middle East and Africa ==
Adriatic Gate Container Terminal, Rijeka, Croatia

In March 2011, ICTSI, through its wholly owned subsidiary, ICBV, entered into a Share Purchase Agreement with Luka Rijeka d.d., a Croatian company to acquire a 51% interest in AGCT at the Port of Rijeka, Croatia's main seaport with a concession period of 30 years until 2041. The terminal has direct road and rail connectivity to any Central Europe hinterlands destination with room to grow.

Baltic Container Terminal, Gdynia, Poland

In May 2003, ICTSI was awarded a 20-year concession by the Port Authority of Gdynia to develop, operate and manage the container terminal in Pomerania, Gdynia, Poland. ICTSI purchased Baltycki Terminal Kontenerowy Sp. z. o. o. (BCT), which had held the lease to the terminal.

Batumi International Container Terminal, Adjara, Georgia

In September 2007, ICTSI, through its wholly owned subsidiary BICTL, acquired from Batumi Port Holdings Ltd. (BPHL) a 48-year concession to operate and develop the main container terminal (Berths 4 and 5) and its adjacent facilities, including a ferry bridge and the dry cargo terminal (Berth 6) in the Port of Batumi in Georgia. Its central geographic location and natural deep-water harbor makes BICT a gateway of container and general cargo to Caucasus and Central Asia.

Basra Gateway Terminal, Umm Qasr, Iraq

In 2014, ICTSI signed a contract with the General Company for Ports in Iraq to manage, operate and rehabilitate terminal facilities in North Port Umm Qasr, Iraq and to develop and expand container handling capacity via new infrastructure development. Iraq's largest port and primary gateway.

Kribi Multipurpose Terminal, Kribi, Cameroon

In 2020, ICTSI signed a concession contract with the Port Autonome de Kribi (PAK) for the development, operation and maintenance of the multipurpose terminal at the Port of Kribi in Ocean, Cameroon. The concession will run 25 years.

Madagascar International Container Terminal, Toamasina, Madagascar

In June 2005, ICTSI signed a 20-year concession with Societe de Gestion du Port Autonome de Toamasina for the operation, management, financing, rehabilitation and development of the container terminal of the Port of Toamasina, Madagascar on a public-private partnership basis. ICTSI subsidiary Madagascar International Container Terminal Services, Ltd. (MICTSL) accomplished the reorganization and upgrading of the yard area, including additional investments in key equipment. Madagascar's main international trading gateway; MICTSL is a key port in the southwest Indian Ocean connecting Africa to global markets.

Matadi Gateway Terminal, Kinshasa, Democratic Republic of the Congo

In January 2014, ICTSI entered a joint venture agreement with La Société De Gestion Immobilière Lengo (SIMOBILE) to develop a container and general cargo terminal along the river bank of the Congo River at Mbengu Matadi, Democratic Republic of the Congo. ICTSI and SIMOBILE formed a joint venture company, Matadi Gateway Terminal to operate and manage the facility. SIMOBILE is a concessionaire of a parcel of land along the Congo river in the district of Mbengu, Township of Matadi in the Democratic Republic of Congo, intended for port use. As the natural gateway to Kinshasa and approximately 150 kilometers upstream from the Atlantic Ocean, strategic MGT is the only terminal in DR Congo with modern infrastructure and equipment.

Onne Multipurpose Terminal , Port Harcourt, Nigeria

In 2021, ICTSI took charge on the development of a multipurpose terminal in Nigeria's Port of Onne. Onne Multipurpose Terminal is the first port to call at the Onne Port Complex equipped to handle containerized, oil and gas, and other cargos. Onne Port Complex is one of the world's largest oil and gas free zones, making OMT a gateway to Africa's largest oil production in Nigeria's hinterland markets.

== Ownership ==
Excluding 26,349,409 common Treasury shares, updated beneficial ownership shareholding structure as of December 31, 2025, with Public Ownership (of common shares) at 50.95% and Foreign Percentage at 26.65%: As 2026Q2, if the preferred shares are included, public ownership drops to 37.79%

Major Shareholder	% of Total*	Common Shares	Preferred Shares*
Enrique K. Razon Jr.^	61.8734%	982,230,747	700,000,000
PCD** Nominee (Filipino)	18.6358%	506,675,461	—
PCD** Nominee (Foreign)- HSBC Manila branch - Client's Account	12.509%	340,098,720	—
PCD** Nominee (Foreign)- Deutsche Bank Manila branch - Client's Account	6.1357%	166,819,111	—
Others	0.5494%	14,937,831	—
Directors, Officers other than Razon	0.2967%	8,066,392	—
Total Voting Equity	2,718,828,262 (100%)	2,018,828,262 (74.25%)	700,000,000 (25.75%)

^ 279,675,000 & 44,917,996 Common shares are lodged under corporate entities/grouping (Bravo International Port Holdings, Inc., "RAZON GROUP SHAREHOLDINGS" respectively) while the Preferred shares are lodged under another corporate entity (Achillon Holdings, Inc.). Razon is said to be the beneficial owner of Bravo and Achillon.
* In Gamboa v. Finance Secretary Teves (G.R. No. 176579 | June 28, 2011) and affirmed in Roy vs. Herbosa (G.R. No. 207246, April 18, 2017), the Supreme Court of the Philippines ruled that under Section 11, Article XII of the Constitution, “capital” in a public utility refers only to shares entitled to vote in the election of directors. Thus, Preferred shares that have been vested with such power are included in the relevant computations, in addition to common shares that naturally are appurtenant with voting privileges in every aspect.
** While the Philippine Central Depository (PCD) is listed a major shareholder, it is more of a trustee-nominee for all shares lodged in the PCD system rather than a single owner/shareholder. Major legal owner shareholders (i.e. those who have at least 5% of outstanding capital stock with voting rights) hidden, if any, under the PCD system are checked/identified and are disclosed with the Definitive Information Statement companies are submitting annually to the local bourse and Securities and Exchange Commission
