= AGCT =

AGCT may refer to:

- Army General Classification Test
- A,G,C,T: the four nucelobases of DNA base pairing
- Asymmetrical gate-commutated turnoff thyristors
- Adriatic Gate Container Terminal, Jadranska vrata, Port of Rijeka, Rijeka, Croatia
