= Adriatic Gate =

Adriatic Gate may refer to:

- Jadranska vrata, an operator of the Port of Rijeka
- Postojna Gate, a mountain pass in Slovenia
