= List of ports in Algeria =

This list of Ports and harbours in Algeria details the ports, harbours around the coast of Algeria.

== List of ports and harbours in Algeria ==
Port/Harbour name	Province	Town name	Coordinates	UN/Locode	Max. draught (m)	Max. deadweight (t)	Remarks
Port of Algiers	Algiers Province	Algiers	36°46′N 03°04′E	DZALG	10	58687	Large-sized port, also known as Port of Alger.
Port of Oran	Oran Province	Oran	35°43′N 00°40′W	DZORN	11.2	64499	Medium-sized port
Port of Skikda	Skikda Province	Skikda	36°53′N 06°55′E	DZSKI	11.5	119456	Medium-sized port. Third largest commercial port in Algeria after Algiers and Oran.
Port of Bejaia	Béjaïa Province	Béjaïa	36°44′N 05°05′E	DZBJA	11.5	116715	Large-sized port on the shores of the Gulf of Béjaïa.
Port of Annaba	Annaba Province	Annaba	36°54′N 07°47′E	DZAAE	10	64499	Medium-sized port. Annaba was described as the "chief seaport of Algeria after Oran and Algiers," by Baedeker's in 1911.
Port of Arzew	Oran Province	Arzew	35°50′N 00°16′W	DZAZW	15	174008	Medium-sized port
Port of Mostaganem	Mostaganem Province	Mostaganem	35°55′N 00°04′E	DZMOS	8.2	39959	Medium-sized port

== See also ==
- List of container ports
