= Port of Rijeka =

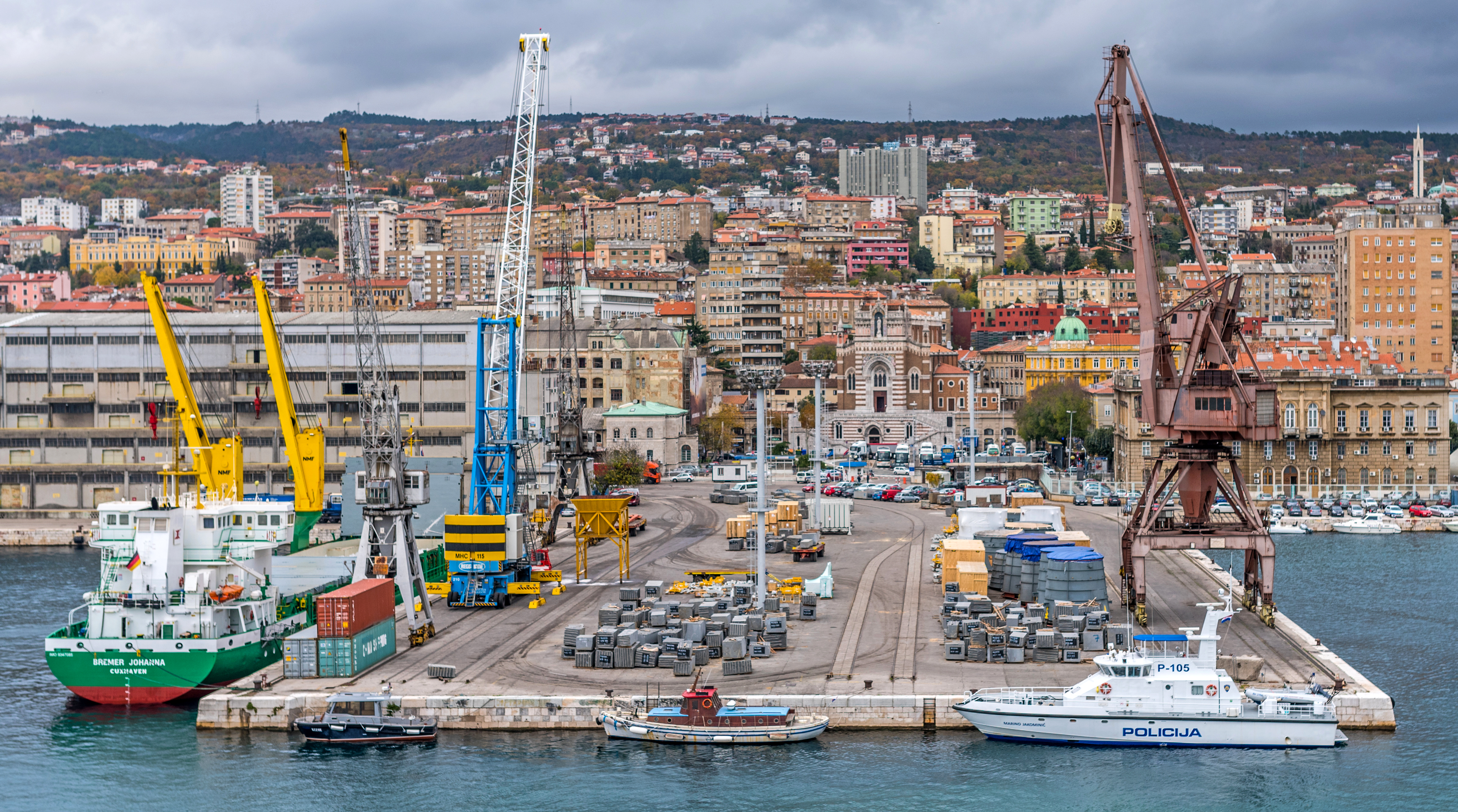
- The port and the city in the background.

- Location in Croatia

Location
- Country: Croatia
- Location: Rijeka
- Coordinates: 45.332358°N 14.421358°E
- UN/LOCODE: HRRJK

Details
- Opened: 13th century
- Operated by: Port of Rijeka Authority; Luka Rijeka d.d. Jadranska vrata d.d. Jadranski naftovod d.d. Rijeka Gateway d.o.o.
- Land area: 150 ha (370 acres)
- No. of berths: 58 + 2 oil terminal berths
- Draft depth: 29.5 m.
- Employees: 635 (2020)
- Director of the Port Authority: Denis Vukorepa
- Luka Rijeka d.d. chairman: Duško Grabovac
- Jadranska vrata d.d. chairman: Emmanuel Papagiannakis
- Jadranski naftovod d.d. chairman: Stjepan Adanić

Statistics
- Vessel arrivals: 4376 (2008) (Note: The figure includes arrivals reported by the Croatian Bureau of Statistics and includes four harbors comprising the Port of Rijeka, i.e. Rijeka, Bršica, Bakar and Omišalj. Arrivals in the individual harbors are specified in the article text.)
- Annual cargo tonnage: ▲12.7 million tonnes (2022)
- Annual container volume: ▲520,866 TEU (2022)
- Passenger traffic: ▲175,961 (2022)
- Annual revenue: ▲305 million kuna (2019)
- Net income: ▲19,5 million kuna (2019)
- Website www.portauthority.hr

The Port of Rijeka (Croatian: Luka Rijeka, IPA: [lǔːka rijěːka]) is a seaport in Rijeka, Croatia, located on the shore of the Kvarner Gulf in the Adriatic Sea. The first records of the port date to 1281. It was the main port of the Kingdom of Austro-Hungary in the 19th century and the beginning of the 20th century, of Yugoslavia between World War II and 1991, and of Croatia after its independence. Today, it is the largest port in Croatia with a cargo throughput of 13.6 million tonnes (2020), mostly oil, general cargo and bulk cargo, and 344,091 Twenty-foot equivalent units (TEUs).

== History ==
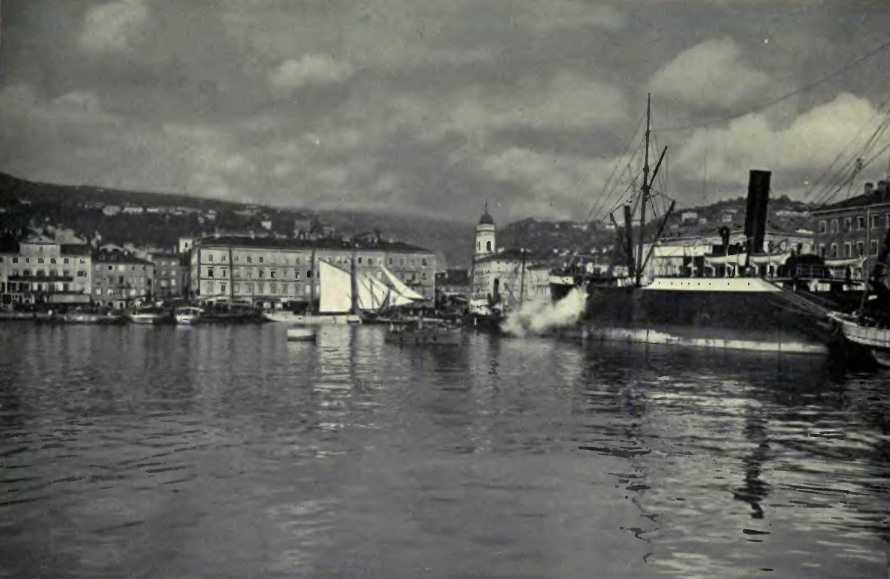
A 1923 photograph of the Port of Rijeka

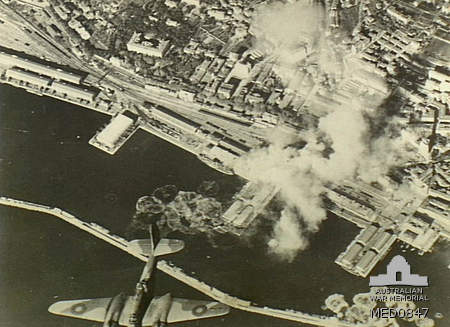
RAF bombing of the Port of Rijeka, 1944

The first record of a port in Rijeka dates back to 1281, when the Great Council of the Republic of Venice reported a conflict of Venetian merchants and ship owners from Zadar and Rab. In 1719, the Port of Rijeka was granted a charter as a free port by Holy Roman Emperor Charles VI, and the first road connecting the port to the hinterland, the Caroline road, was completed in 1728. The inland connections were gradually improved by the construction of the Josephina and Louisiana roads in 1779 and 1810 respectively.

In 1776, Rijeka became a corpus separatum within the Habsburg monarchy, known under its Hungarian/Italian name of Fiume, and was transferred to the Kingdom of Hungary in order to foster trade. Following the Austro-Hungarian Compromise of 1867, Rijeka gained greater importance as the sole Hungarian seaport, and in the second half of the 19th century a new artificial harbor was completed, as well as railway lines to Budapest via Zagreb and to Pivka in present-day Slovenia, where the railway joined the Austrian Southern Railway connecting Vienna and Trieste. The development in this period boosted the Port of Rijeka to rank tenth in transport volume among European ports as it reached a peak in 1913. In the second half of the 19th century, a large breakwater was built along with wharfs in the city of Rijeka itself, moving the shoreline between 100 metres (330 feet) and 200 metres (660 feet). In the period, railway infrastructure was also built to the north of the port, along with storage facilities, administrative buildings and other necessary structures. The railway facilities were designed by Jozsef Bainville, while the port itself was designed by Hilarion Pascal, who had previously designed the Port of Marseille, and Antal Hajnal. The design was presented as a model port at the Weltausstellung in Vienna in 1873 and at the Exposition Universelle in Paris in 1878.

After the defeat of Austria-Hungary in World War I and the Treaty of Rapallo of 1920, Rijeka became an independent city-state known as the Free State of Fiume. That marked the beginning of the port's decline, as it lost a large portion of its major market, Hungary. Italy annexed Rijeka in 1924 by the Treaty of Rome, and the port became peripherally located, with no modern railway or road links to the rest of the country, further adding to the already obvious economic decline.

During World War II, Rijeka was targeted by around 30 Allied bombing raids, and in 1945 the retreating Germans damaged approximately 90% of the port facilities. Among the ships sunk in the port was the German auxiliary cruiser Kiebitz, which would later be raised and repaired to become the Yugoslav Navy Yacht Galeb. The city of Rijeka purchased the ship, which was subsequently moored in the port and eventually opened as a museum in 2011.

Following World War II and the Paris Peace Treaties, Rijeka became a part of Croatia and Yugoslavia. This provided the Port of Rijeka with a new market and sparked further development. A bulk cargo terminal was completed in 1967, followed by warehouses in Škrljevo in 1978. In 1979, a container terminal in Sušak, a phosphate terminal in Rijeka and a timber terminal in Bršica were added. Joining them were a livestock terminal in Bršica and a general cargo terminal with a roll-on/roll-off ramp in the Bakar area in 1982 and 1983 respectively. The greatest volume of cargo was recorded in 1980, when 20.2 million tonnes, including 13.1 million tonnes of liquid cargo, were transported. The port suffered another period of stagnation in the 1990s due to the Croatian War of Independence, when a portion of the port's shipping switched to Trieste and Koper. Since 1996, the volume of operations of the Port of Rijeka has again been gradually growing.

In 2011, Luka Rijeka d.d., a concessionaire of the Port of Rijeka signed a contract of strategic partnership with International Container Terminal Services Inc. (ICTSI) and Jadranska vrata d.d., the second concessionaire of the Port of Rijeka, to operate the container terminal. The partnership aims to expand the terminal's capacity to 600,000 TEUs. The development master plan, devised by Rotterdam Maritime Group, calls for further expansion of the port facilities by 2030, including construction of a large container terminal in Omišalj on Krk Island. The third concessionaire is Jadranski naftovod (JANAF), which operates an oil terminal in Omišalj.

On September 5, 2021, the Port of Rijeka Authority signed a concession with APM terminals and Enna logic, for a period of 50 years. The concession refers to the area of the Zagreb port. With this contract, the new concessionaire undertakes to build the necessary infrastructure and fully equip the Zagreb Deep Sea container terminal in Phase 1 and Phase 2 (construction of 280 meters of new shoreline and equipment) and guarantees a container traffic of 1,000,000 TEU in the first two years of terminal operation.

== Port of Rijeka Authority ==
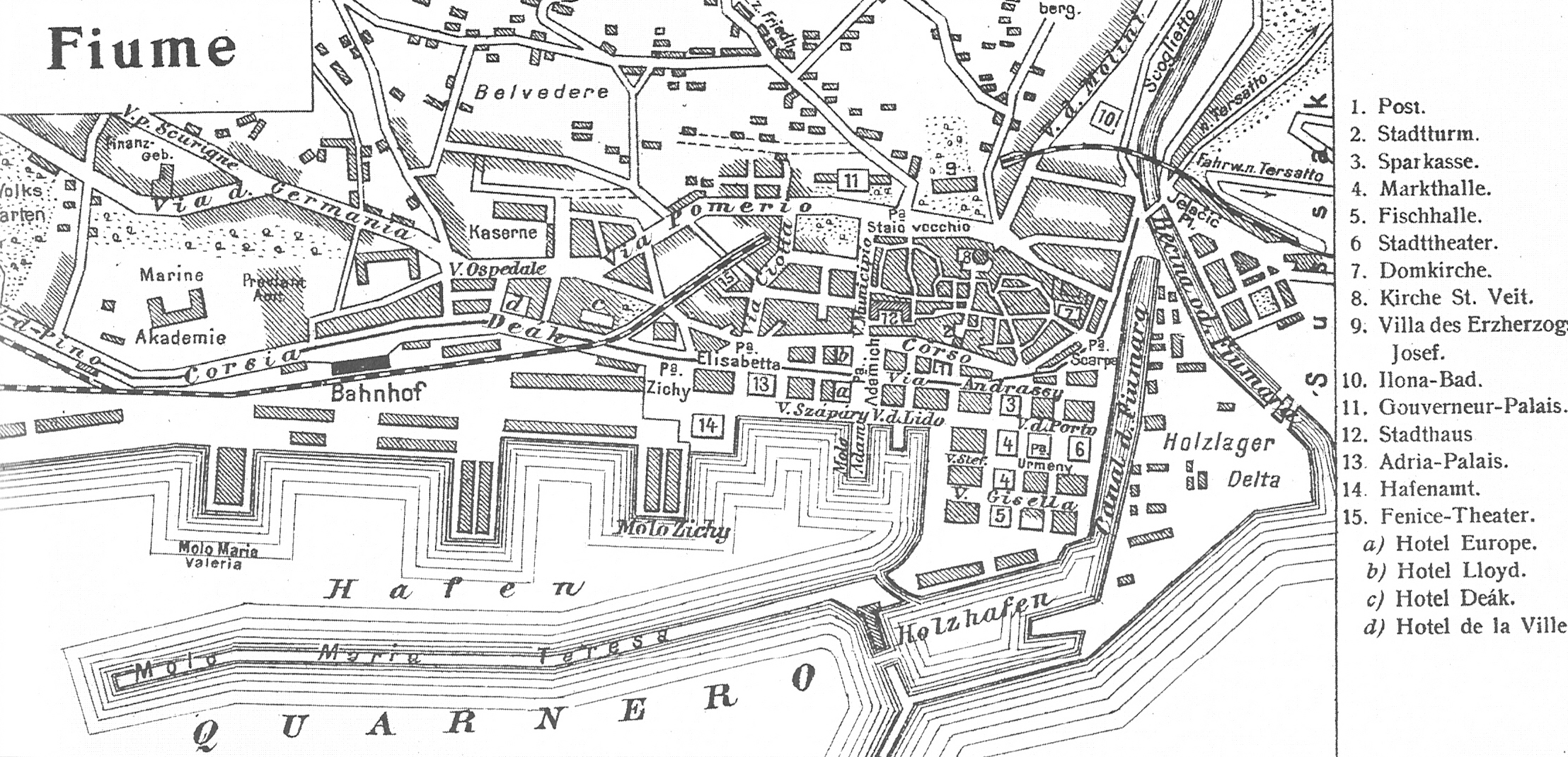
Port of Rijeka, circa 1900

The Port of Rijeka Authority was founded in 1996 by the Republic of Croatia as the first port authority in the country. It is tasked with planning and strategic development, including the issuing of concessions and permits, supervision, safety of navigation in the port area, security and fire protection, as well as waste management. Business operations are managed by the port concessionaires: Luka Rijeka d.d., Jadranski naftovod (JANAF) and Jadranska vrata d.d. and their subcontractors.

In March 2010, the port authorities of Trieste, Ravenna, Venice and Koper established the North Adriatic Ports Association (NAPA) in Trieste with the aim of enhancing the position of the ports in the European Union and its transport patterns. The Port of Rijeka joined the NAPA in November 2010. The NAPA aims to harmonize information systems and organizational setup of the member ports in order to attract shipping. The project was scheduled to be completed by 2013. Besides the NAPA, the Port of Rijeka is also a member of the EcoPorts network of the European Sea Ports Organisation, the International Harbour Masters' Association, Association Internationale Villes et Ports, the Croatian Association of Port Authorities and the International Association of Ports and Harbors.

The Port of Rijeka Authority operates a traffic control centre, located in the new passenger terminal. The traffic control system comprises an Electronic Chart Display and Information System using radar sensors and an Automatic Identification System, as well as additional systems such as a VHF system, hydrometeorological data, Closed-circuit television monitoring of the port and data processing systems. In 2011, the port authority was commended as one of top four port authorities of the year globally.

== Transport facilities ==
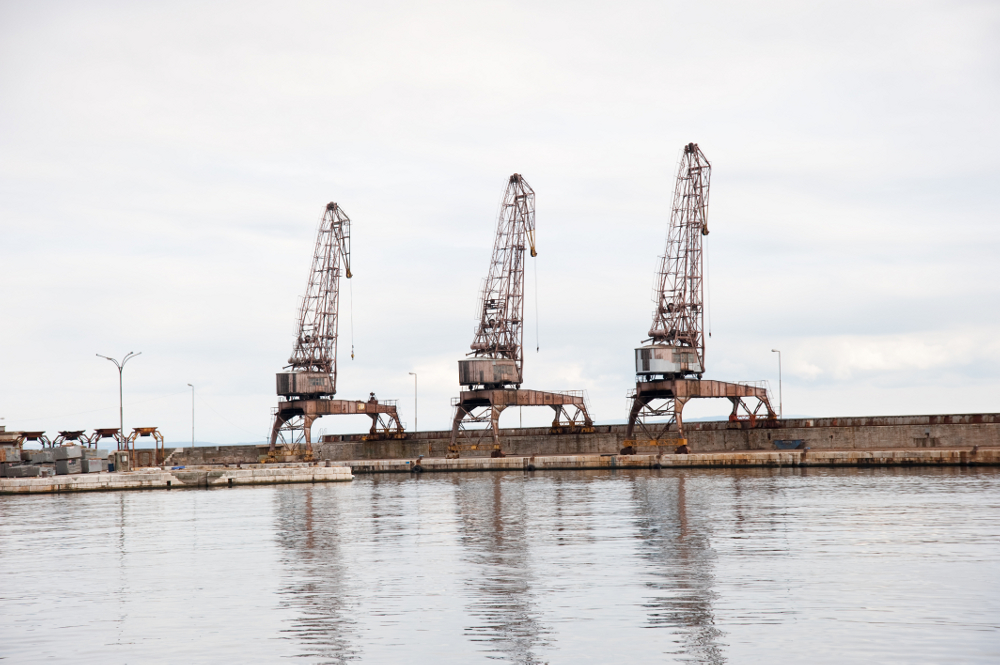
Cranes in the Port of Rijeka

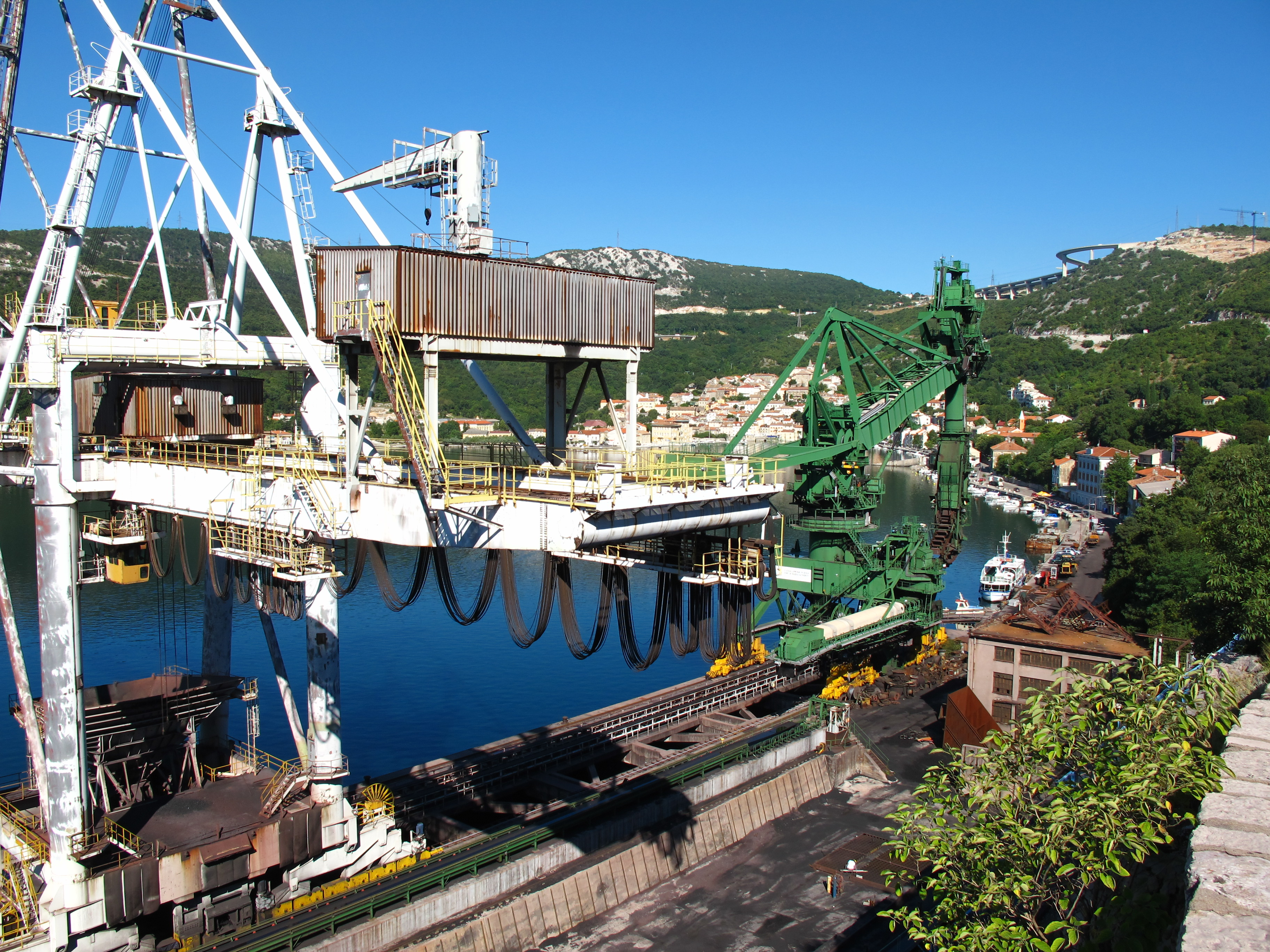
Bakar bulk cargo terminal

The Port of Rijeka is located on the Kvarner Gulf in the northern Adriatic Sea, centered on the city of Rijeka. The facilities include terminals and other structures in the city and in the area reaching from the Bay of Bakar, where the bulk cargo terminal is located, approximately 13 kilometres (8.1 miles) east of Rijeka, to Bršica to the west of Rijeka, where there is a multi-purpose terminal. The Port of Rijeka is at the southern terminus of the Pan-European transport network Corridor Vb, representing a maritime extension of the rail and road routes leading to and from Rijeka. They include modern roads such as the A6 motorway, forming a part of the European route E65 and connecting Zagreb, Budapest and Vienna, and the A7 motorway, a part of the European route E61 and the E65. Rail links comprise single-track railway lines to Zagreb and to Pivka, Slovenia. There are plans to upgrade to a high-performance, double-track railway.

The port comprises several terminals:

- Bulk Cargo Terminal – handles coal, iron ore and bulk cargo; 4 million tonnes annual capacity; accommodates Capesize ships; located in the Bay of Bakar, 13 kilometres (8.1 miles) east of Rijeka
- Cereal Terminal – handles and storage of cereals and oilseeds; 1 million tonnes annual capacity; western part of the Port of Rijeka
- Container and Ro-Ro Terminal – handles intermodal containers; contains a roll-on/roll-off ramp; accommodates Panamax ships, located in the eastern part of the port; operated by Jadranska vrata d.d.
- General Cargo Terminal – handles general cargo, salt and cement; 2 million tonnes annual capacity; western part of the port
- Timber Terminal – handles, stores and processes timber; 500,000 tonnes annual capacity; eastern part of the port
- Škrljevo Terminal – cargo storage, processing and packaging facilities; occupies 41.7 hectares (103 acres) 10 kilometres (6.2 miles) from Rijeka, providing motorway and rail access
- Frigo Terminal – handles and stores refrigerated and frozen food; 100,000 tonnes annual capacity; western part of the port
- Bršica Terminal – handles livestock, timber and general cargo; 60,000 tonnes of annual capacity; located 60 kilometres (37 miles) to the west from Rijeka
- Passenger Terminal – 11 piers; serving 200,000 passengers per year, largely traveling by lines serving nearby islands and other ports along the Adriatic coast.
- Liquid Cargo Terminal – two Capesize berths (30-metre (98 ft) draft); located in Omišalj Bay (operated by JANAF) and Sepen Bay (operated by DIOKI d.d.), both on Krk Island; annual capacity of 24 million tonnes of oil; 130,000 tonnes storage capacity; the terminal is linked to a pipeline operated by JANAF and the DINA petrochemical plant in Omišalj
- Zagreb Deep Sea Container Terminal –currently in the equipping phase, will start operating in 2024; located in the eastern part of the port; operated by Rijeka Gateway d.o.o.

The port has 58 berths and two additional berths in the Liquid Cargo Terminal, 150-hectare (370-acre) total port area, and 335,000 square metres (3,610,000 square feet) of enclosed warehouses.

== Business operations ==
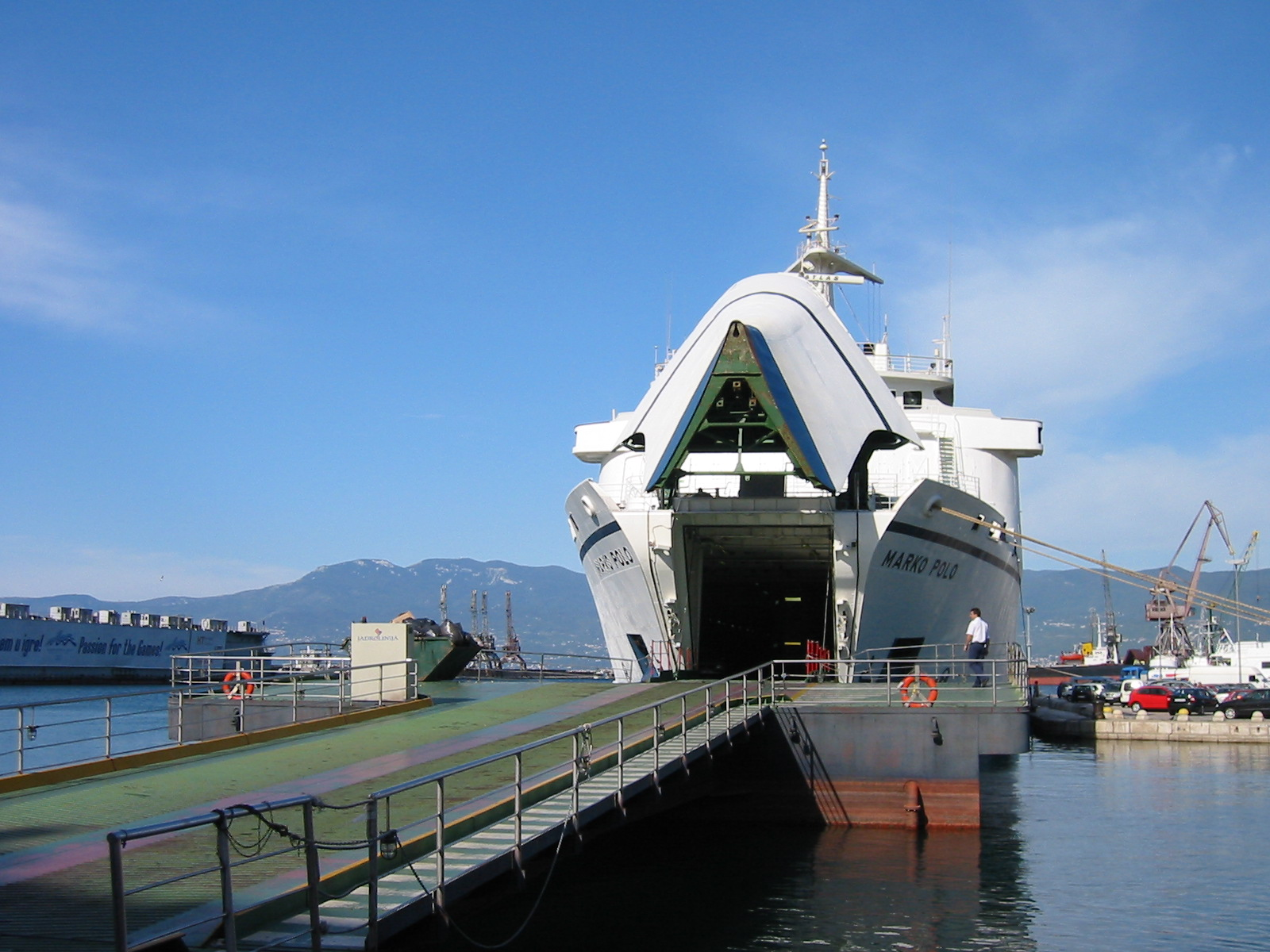
Jadrolinija Marko Polo ferry in the Port of Rijeka

The port of Rijeka is the largest port in Croatia, handling the largest portion of the country's imports and exports. In 2008, 2418 ships docked at Rijeka itself, 872 at Bršica, 818 at Bakar, and 268 at Omišalj—a total of 4376. In 2010, the Port of Rijeka transported 10.2 million tonnes of cargo, a 9% drop from 2009. However the figure represents a 69% increase of dry cargo transport volume compared to 2002. The 2010 figure includes 5.6 million tonnes of liquid cargo, 2.3 million tonnes of general cargo, 2.0 million tonnes of bulk cargo and 254,000 tonnes of timber. The container terminal recorded a substantial growth of business in past years. 137,048 TEUs were transported through the port in 2010, marking a 5% rise in turnover compared to 2009 and a ninefold increase over 2002. The Port of Rijeka also serves passenger and ferry lines operated by Jadrolinija to the nearby islands of Cres, Mali Lošinj, Susak, Ilovik, Unije, Rab and Pag, as well as to Adriatic ports further south, such as Split and Dubrovnik. The line to Split and Dubrovnik also serves the islands of Hvar, Korčula and Mljet. The passenger terminal serves approximately 200,000 passengers each year. As of November 2021, there are four concessionaires operating in the Port of Rijeka: Luka Rijeka d.d., Jadranska vrata d.d., JANAF and Rijeka Gateway d.o.o.

=== Luka Rijeka ===
In 2010, Luka Rijeka d.d. reported a net profit of 32,000 kuna (4,300 euro), a sharp decline from 3.5 million kuna (0.47 million euro) the previous year. Total income in 2010 reached 210.4 million kuna (28.4 million euro), down from 228.9 million kuna (30.9 million euro) in 2009. In 2010, the company had 935 employees. It is listed at the Zagreb Stock Exchange, with a share capital of 598 million kuna (80.8 million euro). Luka Rijeka d.d. is owned by the state (72.7%), Croatian Healthcare Fund (8.1%) and other stockholders, none of which owns more than 5% of the stock.

Denis Vukorepa has been the chairman of the board of the company since 2002. The appointment is limited to a five-year term, but in May 2011, Vukorepa's term was extended for the second time.

Luka Rijeka's concession in the Port of Rijeka is valid until 2012, and a request to renew the concession for another 30 years has been filed. Luka Rijeka uses 117 hectares (290 acres) of land operated by the Port of Rijeka Authority.

=== Jadranska vrata ===
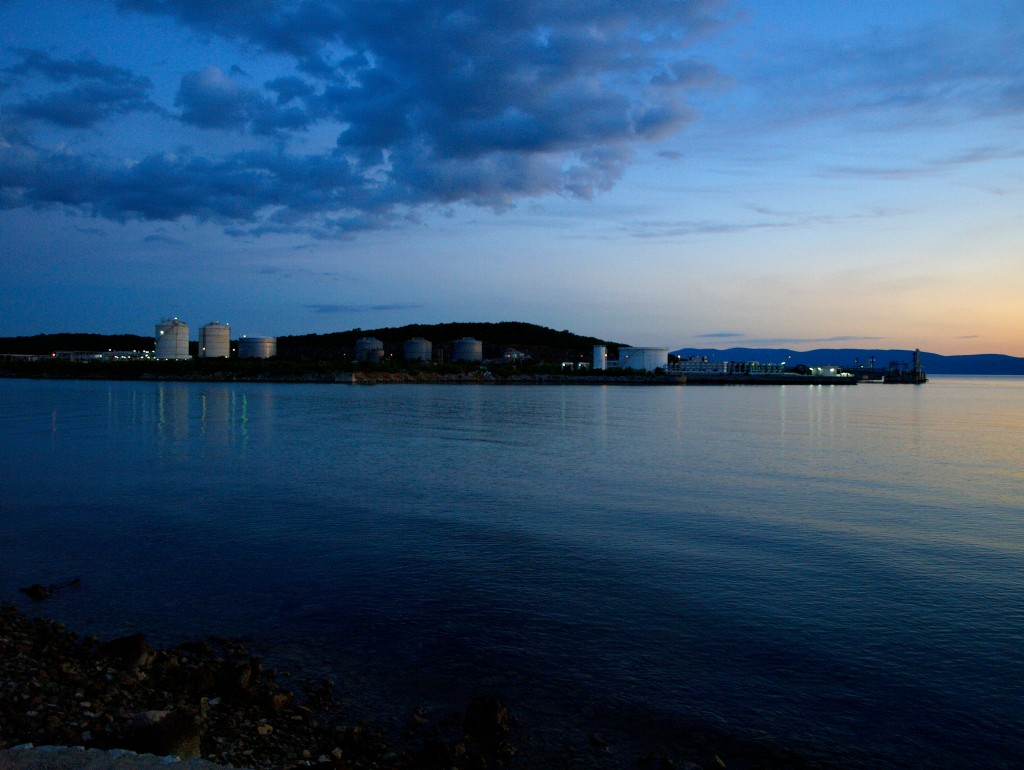
JANAF facilities in Omišalj

The Jadranska vrata d.d. company was founded as a Luka Rijeka d.d. subsidiary, and was tasked with operating the container cargo terminal located in the Brajdica district of Rijeka. As of August 2011, International Container Terminal Services Inc. (ICTSI) acquired a 51% share in the company, becoming a strategic partner. The company has also become prominent under its English name—Adriatic Gate Container Terminal. Jadranska vrata d.d. has acquired a separate concession to operate the container terminal in the Port of Rijeka until 2041. Antonio P. Passaro was appointed as chief executive officer of Jadranska vrata d.d. by ICTSI in 2011.

=== Jadranski naftovod ===
Jadranski naftovod (JANAF) operates an oil terminal at Omišalj, Krk Island. In 2010, the JANAF transported 6.4 million tonnes of oil, a 7% drop from 6.9 million tonnes in 2009. In 2010, JANAF recorded annual revenue of 464.9 million kuna (62.8 million euro), down less than 1% from 2009, and annual net profit of 118.5 million kuna (16 million euro), up 11% from the previous year. However, JANAF operations include other facilities and services besides the oil terminal concession in the Port of Rijeka. JANAF is a joint stock company owned by the Croatian Pension Insurance Institute (50.5%), INA (16%), the Republic of Croatia (14.5%) and other shareholders owning less than 10% of stock each. JANAF's chairman of the board is Ante Markov. As of March 31, 2011, JANAF had 383 employees working in the Omišalj terminal and other JANAF facilities in Croatia.

=== Rijeka Gateway ===
Rijeka Gateway is a joint venture between APM Terminals (51%) and Enna Logic (49%), intended for the management of the Zagreb Deep Sea Container Terminal. On November 5, 2021, the company signed a concession for the management of the terminal within 50 years and undertook to equip it in the first phase with the necessary equipment and three shore cranes. The second phase includes the construction of an additional 280 meters of operational shore (which will be a total of 680 meters of shore) and the delivery of one additional shore crane as well as the rest of the equipment at the new part of the terminal.

== Future expansion ==
In 2011, Luka Rijeka d.d., operator of the Port of Rijeka, signed a contract of strategic partnership with the ICTSI and Jadranska vrata d.d.. The partnership aims to expand the capacity of the container terminal to 600,000 TEUs. The contract also stipulates that the concession regarding operation of the terminal is to last for 30 years with an investment of 54 million euro. It is estimated that ICTSI and Luka Rijeka d.d. will invest up to one billion kuna (135 million euro) in the Port of Rijeka. Upgrades of other port terminals are also planned, with investments through the World Bank and through build-operate-transfer and public–private partnership schemes. They include cargo terminals in the city of Rijeka and the new passenger terminal opened in October 2009.

The Port of Rijeka development master plan, devised by Rotterdam Maritime Group, specifies further expansion of port facilities by 2030, including the construction of a large container terminal in Omišalj on Krk Island, near the JANAF Omišalj oil terminal. The container terminal would increase the annual capacity of the port by 2.5 million TEUs. The plan requires construction of a high performance railway to Zagreb and a rail link planned by Croatian Railways to the proposed island terminal. The new line entails building a new bridge to Krk Island in addition to the existing Krk Bridge. The plan also includes expansion of the existing terminals, and is estimated to require an additional US$150 million. Likewise, an expansion of the Liquid Cargo Terminal is planned, as well as an expansion of the Bakar Bay facility, where a car terminal is planned. The expansion of the port, improvement of transportation links and the strategic partnership are aimed at establishing Rijeka as the largest container port on the Adriatic Sea.

== See also ==
- Transport in Croatia
