= Port of Altamira =

Altamira
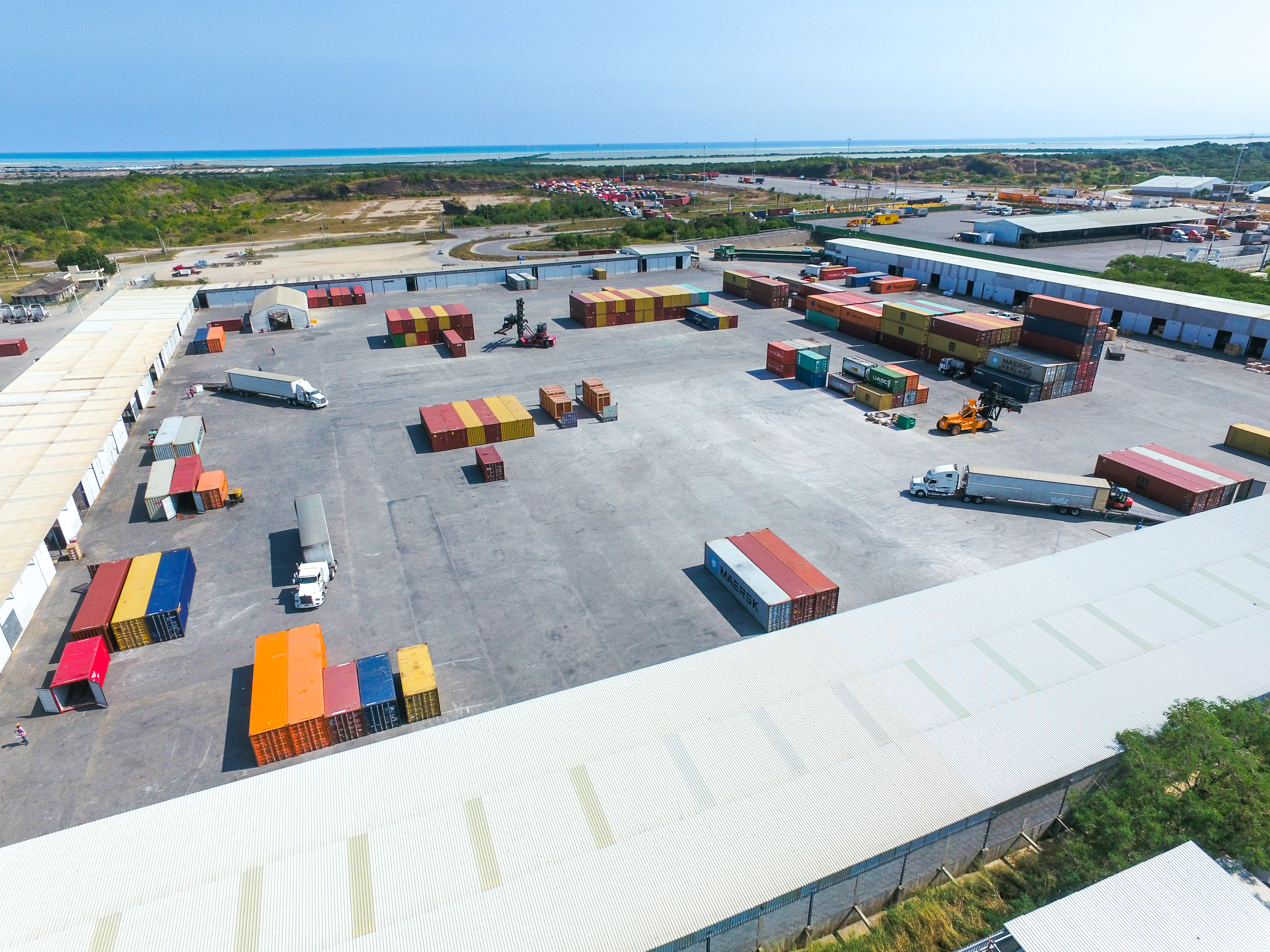
- Multimodal terminal at Altamira
- Click on the map for a fullscreen view
- Altamira (Mexico)

Location
- Country: Mexico
- Location: Altamira, Tamaulipas
- Coordinates: 22°28′N 97°51′W
- UN/LOCODE: MXATM

Details
- No. of berths: 17
- Draft depth: 12.19 metres (40.0 ft)

Statistics
- Website puertoaltamira.com.mx

The Port of Altamira is an industrial port facility located on Mexico's east coast on the northwest side of the Gulf of Campeche. It is located in Altamira, Tamaulipas, 15 n.m. north of Tampico.

The Altamira Industrial Port Complex started operating in June 1985, and now contains 14 marine terminals and handles over 22 million tonnes of cargo every year.
