= Port of Samsun =

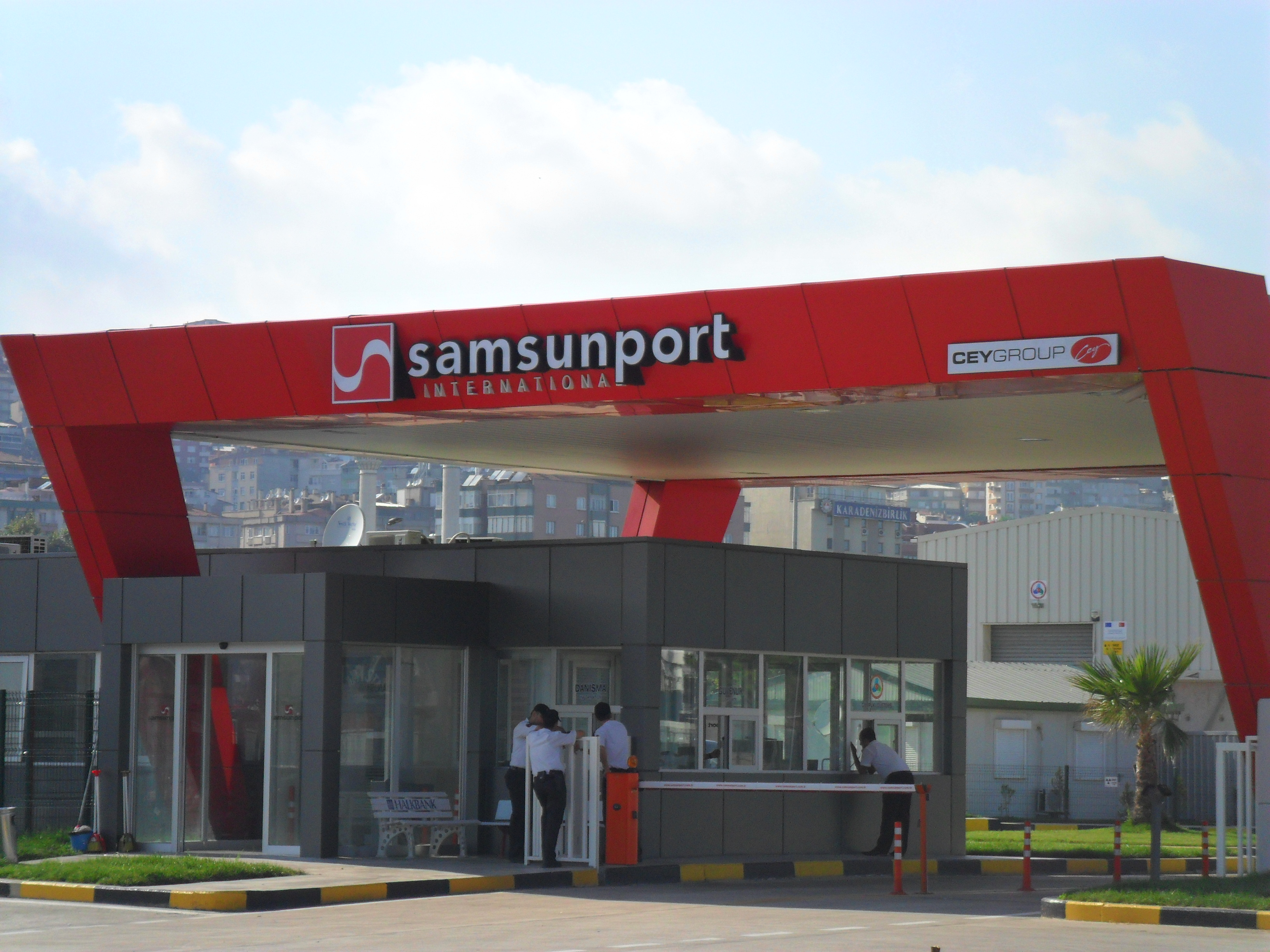
- An entrance gate to the Port of Samsun
- Click on the map for a fullscreen view

Location
- Country: Turkey
- Location: Ilkadim, Samsun
- Coordinates: 41°17′59″N 36°20′40″E

Details
- Opened: 1963
- Operated by: Ceynak Logistics
- Owned by: Turkish State Railways
- No. of piers: 12
- Port Director: Ali Avcı
- Free Trade Zone: Samsun Free Trade Zone
- Class 1 Railroad Access: Turkish State Railways

Statistics
- Annual cargo tonnage: 10.8 million metric tons (2021)
- Website https://www.samsunport.com.tr/en/homepage

The Port of Samsun or Samsunport is an industrial port located in Samsun, Turkey. The Port of Samsun is the largest port of the Black Sea Region and Turkey's largest port in the Black Sea.

== History ==
Samsun (then known as Amisos) was settled in about 760–750 BC by Ionians from Miletus, who established a flourishing trade relationship with the ancient peoples of Anatolia. The city's ideal combination of fertile ground and shallow waters attracted numerous traders and made the city an optimal port. Samsun has operated as a port since its origin with periods of prosperity and decline.

During the late Ottoman Empire, Samsun had some docklands but was generally a poorly developed and antiquated port. In 1910, officials from the Ottoman Empire made an agreement with officials from the British Empire to construct a modern port facility with piers at Samsun. Although an agreement was signed with the British to construct a port, progress on the project was halted due to the start of the First World War. Following the Turkish War of Independence, the Turkish state took on the project of constructing modern piers and a deeper harbor at Samsun.

== Operation ==
The port serves export, import cargoe and transit traffic to Iran and Iraq. It is well located both for trade with countries having a coast on the Black Sea and for potential growth of the cargo industry which will arise due to Black Sea Economic Co-operation Region (BSECR) project. Samsun is also well located for the cargo ships destined to the Middle East from continental Europe through Rhine-Main-Danube Canal. The port is protected by 2 breakwaters with lengths of 3,132 m and 1,580 m.

5.4 million tons of cargo were transported through the Port of Samsun between January 2021 and June 2021 per the Turkish Ministry of Transport and Infrastructure making it one of the busiest ports in Turkey.
