= Port of Cirebon =

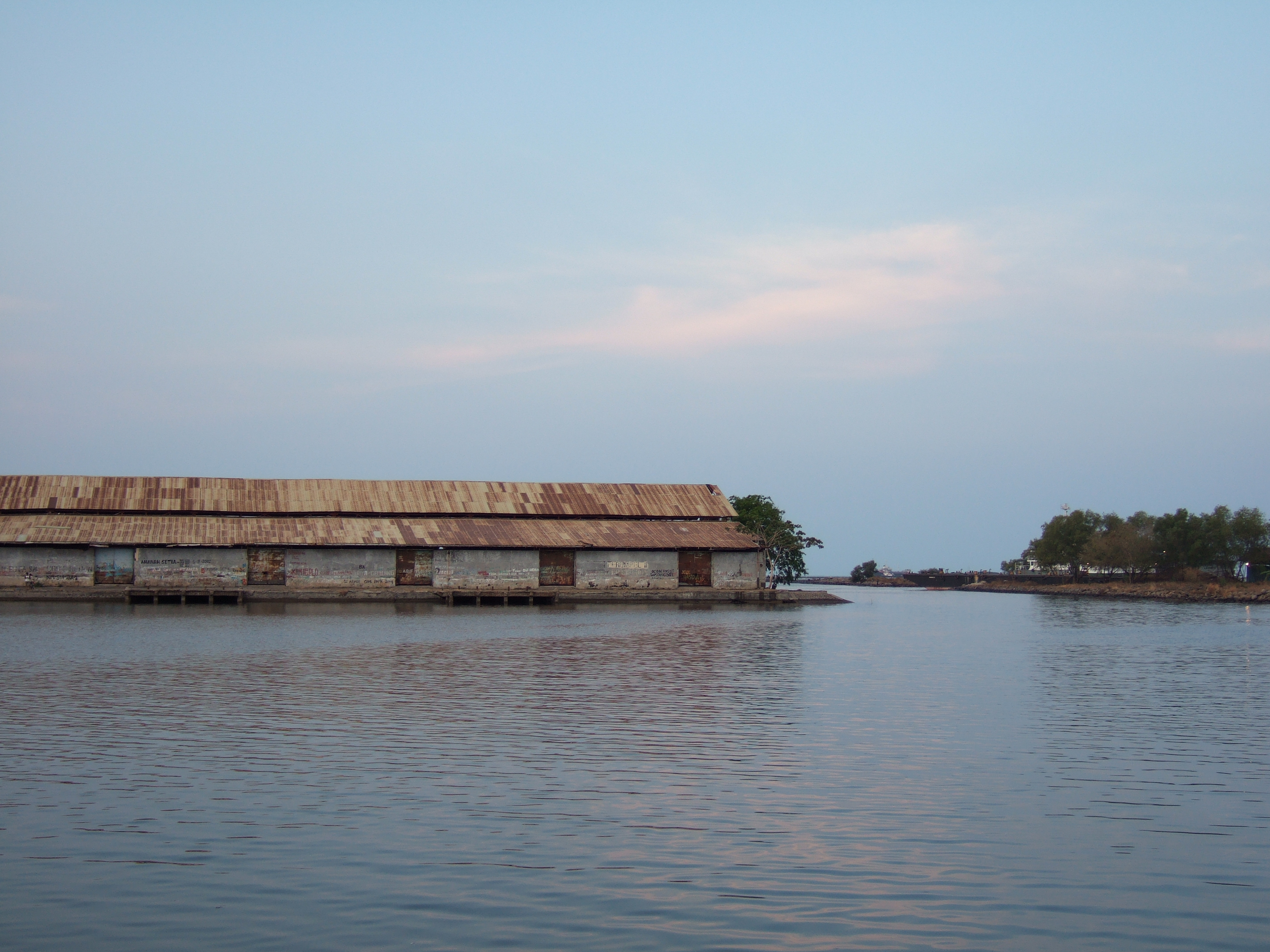
- Port of Cirebon (2006)
- Click on the map for a fullscreen view

Location
- Country: Indonesia
- Location: Cirebon, northern coast of Java
- Coordinates: 6°42′35″S 108°34′22″E

Details
- Opened: 1865
- Operated by: Port Authority of Tanjung Priok
- Owned by: Government of Indonesia
- Land area: 25 hectares
- No. of berths: 17
- No. of wharfs: 3
- Warehouse space: 26 hectares

Statistics
- Vessel arrivals: 1957 vessels (in 2006)
- Annual cargo tonnage: 3.27 million metric tons (in 2006)
- Annual container volume: 64 TEU (in 2006)
- Passenger traffic: Fortnightly ferry services to Borneo
- Main imports: Coal, asphalt, vegetable oils
- Main exports: Cement, tea, rice, sugar
- Website; Port of Cirebon website

The Port of Cirebon is a multipurpose seaport in the city of Cirebon on the north coast of the Indonesian island of Java.

Port activity is dominated by bulk imports of coal, liquid asphalt and vegetable oils for the West Java hinterland. Minor operations include a small container terminal and a single passenger berth. In 2006 the port handled 3.27 million metric tons (MT) of trade, more than 90 percent as imports from other Indonesian ports.

== History ==
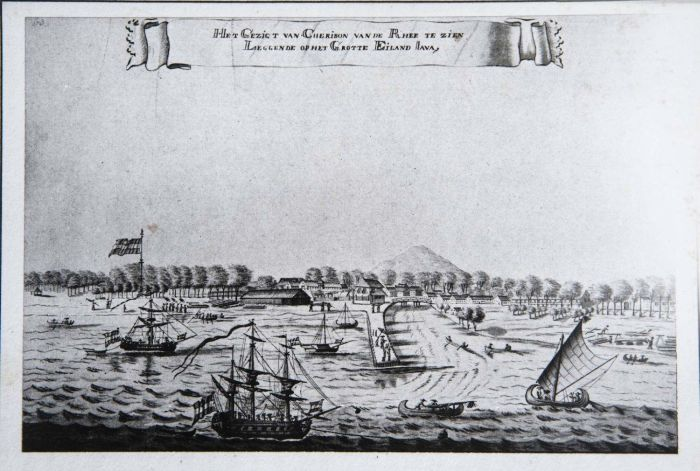
Port of Cirebon in the 17th century.

The Port of Cirebon was established by the Dutch East India Company in 1865, principally as an export point for spices, sugar cane and raw materials from West Java. Warehouses and open storage areas were developed by 1890, and a British American Tobacco cigarette factory was built in the early twentieth century.

The port does not have its own port authority. From 1927 to 1957 it was administered by the port authority for Semarang, and thereafter by the port authority for Tanjung Priok.

== Port operations ==
=== Bulk cargo ===
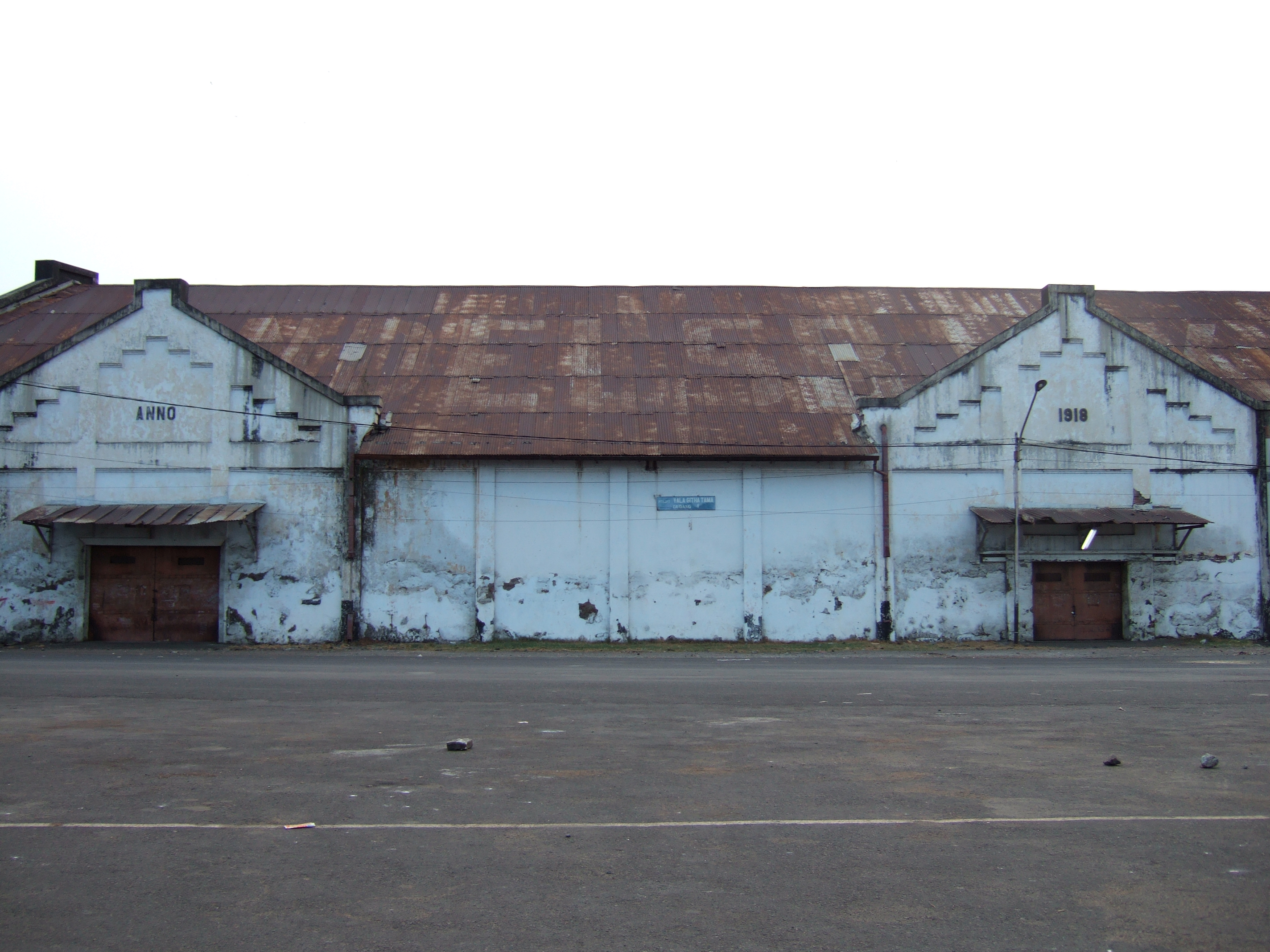
Warehouse at Port of Cirebon (2006)

The bulk coal terminal has a storage capacity of 50,000 MT and supplies cement factories in Cirebon, Cibinong and Bogor. Coal unloading capacity is 20 tons per hour. but utilisation rates are low – in 2005 bulk cargo terminal utilisation fell to just 41 percent.

Specialist liquid asphalt and vegetable oil terminals are operated as joint ventures with the private sector. Asphalt storage capacity is 11,300 MT across six tanks. The vegetable oil handling facility occupies 18 km^{2} of port land with a storage capacity of 10,300 MT.

Exports include bulk cement to Europe and Japan, and the transshipment of tea, rice, sugar and a regular quantity of locally produced rattan furniture.

=== Passenger services ===
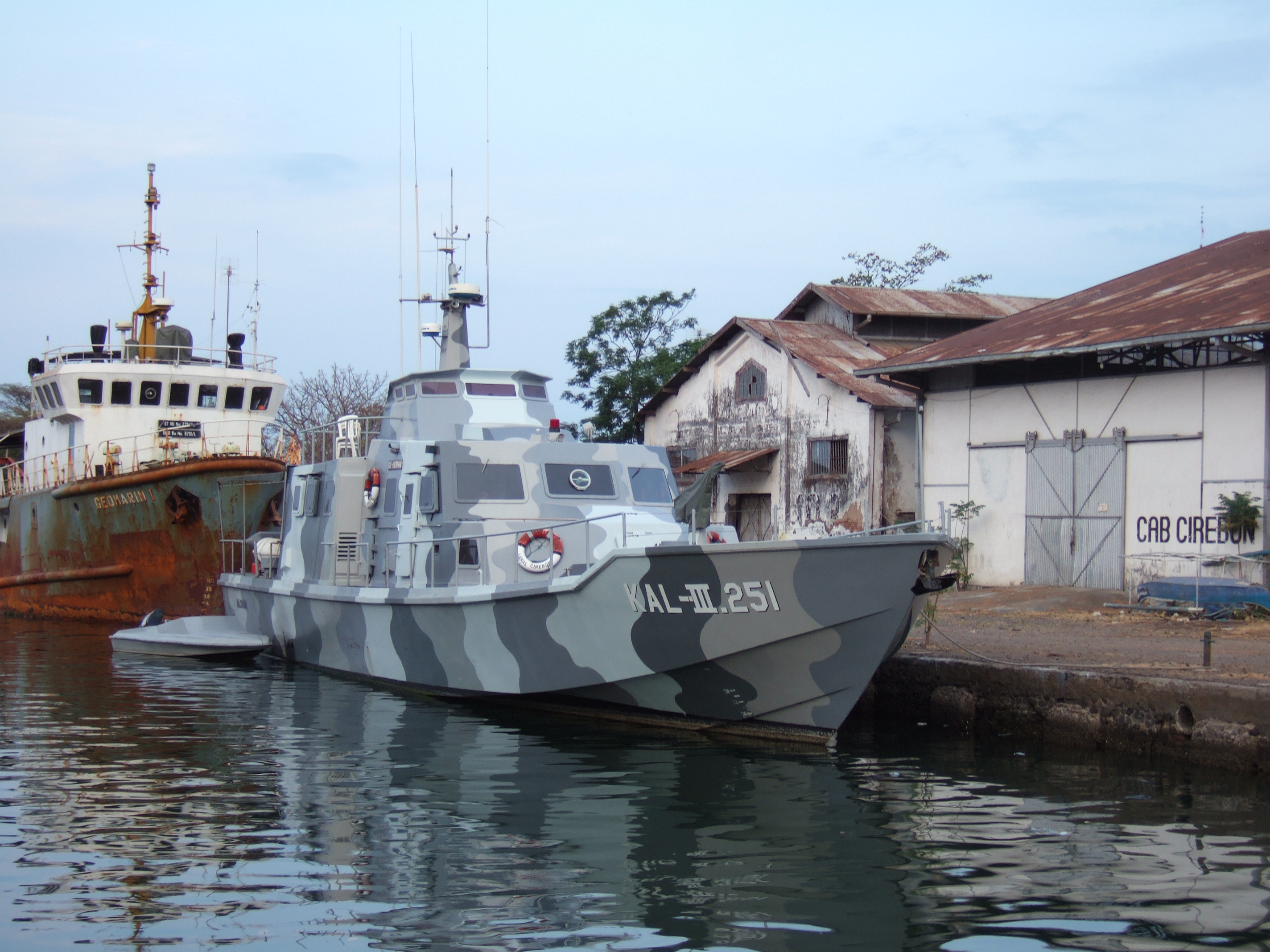
Patrol boat at Port of Cirebon (2006)

A small passenger terminal operates adjacent to the bulk cargo wharves. Passenger facilities occupy 1,600 m^{2} and currently cater for a single fortnightly service running between Cirebon and Pontianak in West Kalimantan, Borneo.

=== Containers ===
A container handling facility was officially opened in 2002 ahead of anticipated increased demand for containerised exports. The facility handled 64 TEU in its first year before ceasing operation in 2003.

== Berths and logistics ==
The Port of Cirebon covers 25 hectares of land for port operations and a further 26 hectares for storage and warehousing. The port contains five medium cargo-handling berths with lengths up to 275 m and low-water depths up to 7 m.

Principal cargo berths – Port of Cirebon
Berth	Quay length (m)	Depth at LWS (m)	Capacity (ton/m^{2})
Muarajati I	275	7.0	3
Muarajati II	248	5.5	2
Muarajati III	80	7.0	3
Linggarjati I	131	4.5	2
Pelita I (Jetty)	30	4.5	1
Pelita II (Jetty)	51	4.5	1
Pelita III (Jetty)	30	4.5	1

Twelve smaller berths of between 11 and 40 metres are also available, though depth at low water is in some cases two metres. Tidal range is up to 1.3 metres with strong south to south-westerly winds. Channel depth is 7 m with a width of 17.5 m^{2}.
