= Port of Hiroshima =

Port of Hiroshima 広島港
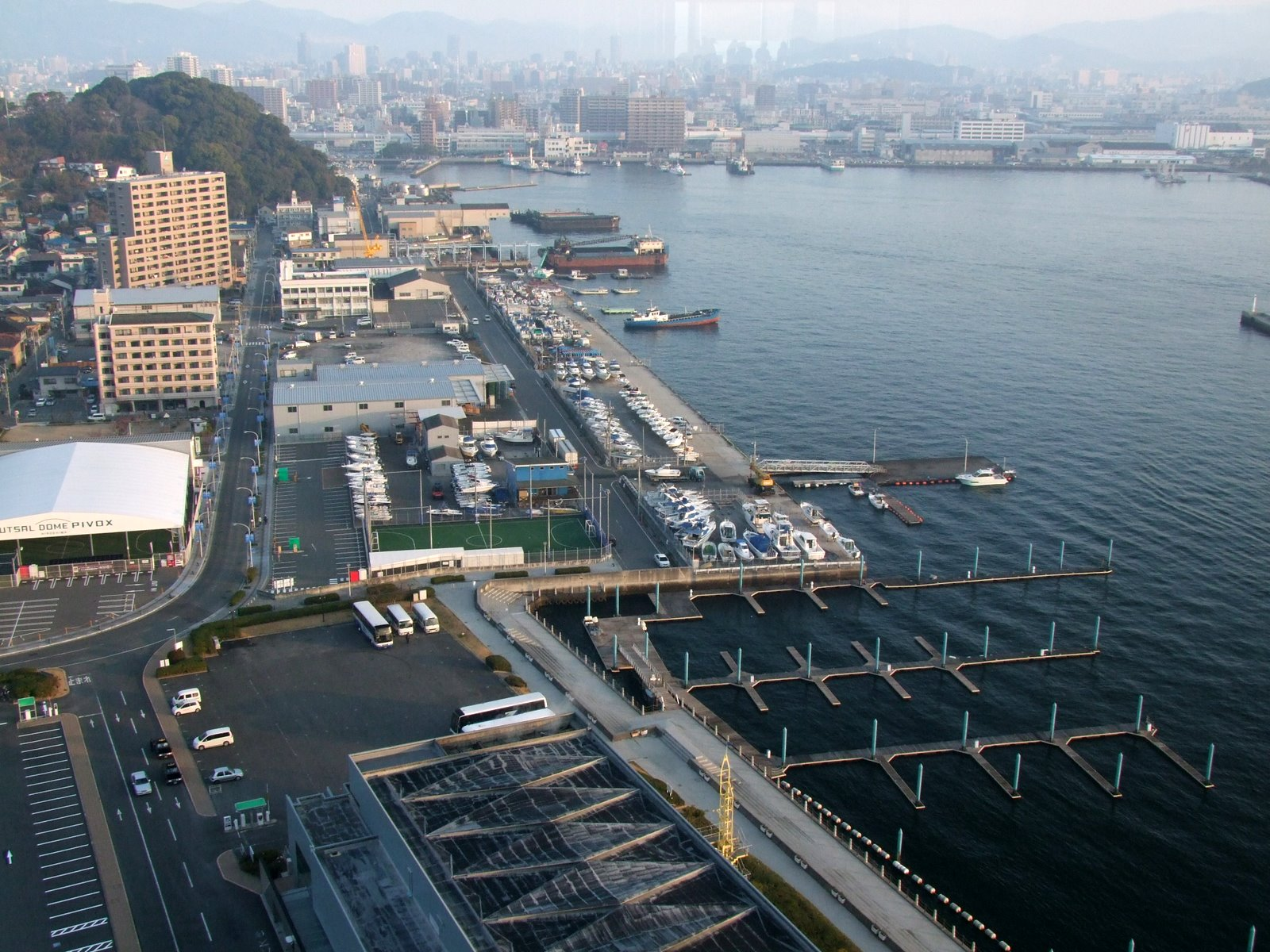
- Interactive map of Port of Hiroshima 広島港

Location
- Country: Japan
- Location: Hiroshima, Hiroshima Prefecture
- Coordinates: 34°21′7.8″N 132°27′18.43″E

Details
- Opened: 1171
- Operated by: Hiroshima Prefecture

The Port of Hiroshima (広島港, Hiroshima-kō) is a seaport in Hiroshima, Hiroshima Prefecture, Japan.
