= Luka Rijeka =

Luka Rijeka d.d.
- Company type: Public
- Traded as: ZSE: LKRI
- Industry: Transport
- Founded: 1999 (in present form)
- Headquarters: Rijeka, Croatia
- Key people: Duško Grabovac (CEO)
- Revenue: 30,521,000 euro (2024)
- Net income: ▲167.75 million kuna
- Total assets: 154,185,000 euro (2024)
- Number of employees: 635 (2020)
- Website: www.lukarijeka.hr

Luka Rijeka is a Croatian port operating company which operates port facilities at the largest Croatian Port of Rijeka and several other terminals nearby. In 2020, Luka Rijeka d.d., a concessionaire of the Port of Rijeka reported net profit of 3.321 million kuna (442,940 euro), while total income in 2020 reached 167.75 million kuna (22.4 million euro). In 2020, the company had 635 employees. Share capital of the company is 539 million kuna (71.9 million euro), and it is listed at the Zagreb Stock Exchange. Since 2020, chairman of the board of the company is Duško Grabovac.

Luka Rijeka d.d. is owned by OT Logistics (27.36%), the Croatian government (25.02%), different investment funds (25.63%) and other small share stockholders (6.97%). Luka Rijeka d.d. concession in the Port of Rijeka is valid until 2042.
