= Jadranska Vrata =

Jadranska Vrata d.d.
- Company type: Public
- Industry: Transport
- Founded: 2001
- Headquarters: Rijeka, Croatia
- Parent: ICTSI (51%); Luka Rijeka (49%)
- Website: www.adriatic-gate.hr

Jadranska Vrata (Adriatic Gate Container Terminal) is a Croatian port operating company which operates port facilities at the largest Croatian Port of Rijeka. Jadranska Vrata d.d. company was founded as a Luka Rijeka d.d. subsidiary, and tasked with operating the container cargo terminal located in the Brajdica district of Rijeka. As of August 2011, the International Container Terminal Services Inc. (ICTSI) acquired 51% share in the company becoming a strategic partner, and the company is since also prominent under its English name–Adriatic Gate Container Terminal. Jadranska Vrata d.d. has acquired a separate concession to operate the container terminal in the Port of Rijeka until 2041.

== History ==
The container terminal is located in the Sušak basin Port of Rijeka, and it started operating in 1977. Then, in that first phase of construction, the first container crane was installed in the port. After that, in 1987, a 300-meter-long southern shore with a depth of 11.2 meters was built. Jadranska vrata d.d. have been the holder of the concession at the Brajdica container terminal since 2001. In 2011 the International Container Terminal Services Inc. (ICTSI) acquired 51% share in the company with Luka Rijeka d.d. holding the rest.

In 2013, after the implementation of the Rijeka Gateway project at the container terminal, the second phase of the terminal's construction was completed, i.e. the extension of the wharf for another berth and the corresponding increase in storage areas, as well as the construction of the entry-exit point. With the completion of works worth 30 million Euros, the depth of the sea increased to a minimum of 14.2 meters and enabled the servicing of container ships up to 370 meters in length, which achieved a maximum capacity of 600,000 TEU. This was followed by the installation of a temporary buoy for the mooring of ships and the construction of an entry and exit point and a veterinary. After the implementation of expansion works within the framework of the Rijeka Gateway project, the concessionaire company Jadranska vrata d.d. installed new coastal and warehouse equipment for container transshipment worth 23 million Euros, namely two Panamax coastal cranes with a large capacity, six container bridges and two container bridges for railways.

In addition to the large investment in the implementation of the Rijeka Gateway project, significant funds were approved for the implementation of the European project from the Connecting Europe Facility (CEF). The project called Development of a multimodal platform in the port of Rijeka and connection with the container terminal Jadranska vrata (POR2CORE-AGCT) in the value of 35,556,000 euros will improve the intermodal terminal by reconstructing the existing Rijeka-Brajdica marshalling yard and by expanding the existing tunnel with a length of 400 meters for construction purposes extraction track, which will significantly increase the share of railway transport in container traffic by December 2020.

In 2018, the project Improvement of the infrastructure of the port of Rijeka - AGCT dredging (POR2CORE-AGCT dredging) was also approved. The project worth 13.9 million Euros will also be financed from the CEF program in partnership with the concessionaire at the terminal, Jadranska vrata d.d. The funds will be used to finance the adaptation of the port in order to increase the capacity and the possibility of accepting larger vessels.

== Sea connectivity ==
Container terminals is connected via one direct line with Far East and five feeder services to other Mediterranean ports:

- Ocean Alliance: CMA CGM, COSCO, Evergreen, OOCL
  - Shanghai → Ningbo → Busan → Shekou → Singapore → Alexandria → Beirut → Tripoli → Koper → Trieste → Rijeka → Alexandria → Jeddah → Port Kelang → Shekou → Shanghai
- COSCO, OOCL, ONE, HMM
  - Rijeka → Piraeus → Rijeka
- MSC
  - Marsaxlokk → Trieste → Koper → Rijeka →Tekirdag (Asyaport) → Marsaxlokk
  - Gioia Tauro → Marsaxlokk → Koper → Rijeka → Ploče → Gioia Tauro → Marsaxlokk → Piraeus → Mersin → Iskenderun → Gioia Tauro
- CMA CGM
  - Izmir → Aliaga → Istanbul (Ambarli) → Gebze → Gemlik → Malta → Ancona → Ravenna → Venice → Trieste → Koper → Rijeka → Bar → Taranto → Malta → Limassol → Alexandria → Beirut → Lattakia → Tartous (1/2) → Beirut → Izmir
  - Malta → Durrës → Rijeka → Salerno → Malta

== Container throughput ==
Terminal traffic from 2003 until today:

Year	2001	2002	2003	2004	2005	2006	2007	2008	2009	2010	2011	2012	2013	2014	2015	2016	2017	2018	2019	2020	2021	2022	2023	2024
TEU	12,711	15,215	28,290	60,846	76,258	94,390	145,024	168,761	130,740	137,048	130,054	126,680	131,310	149,838	161,838	177,401	210,377	227,375	271,817	303,626	312,321	373,343	385,794	409,415
