= Port of Ravenna =

Port area of Ravenna, Italy

Coordinates: 44°26′45″N 12°14′37″E

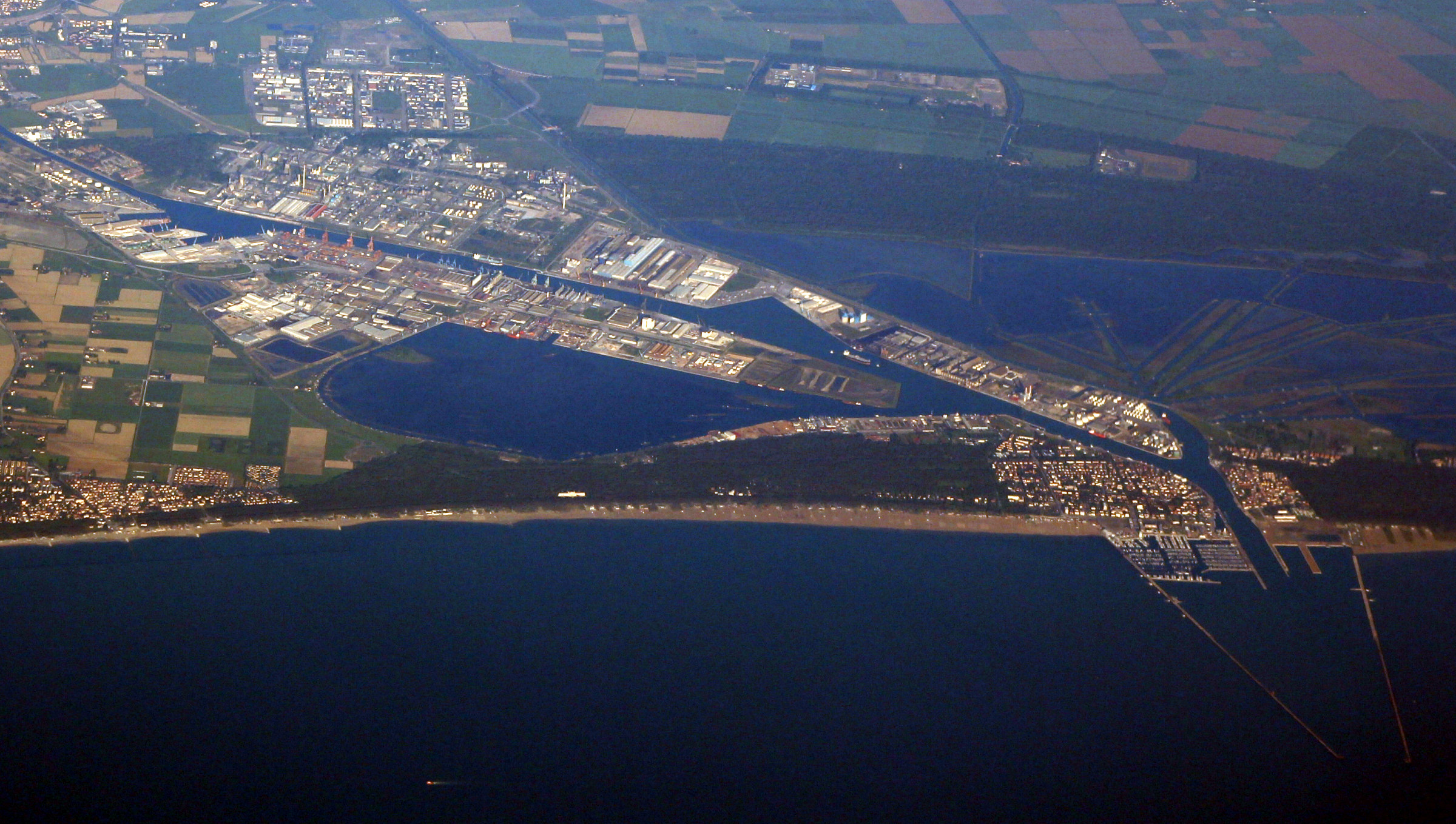
A view of the port

The Port of Ravenna (Italian: Porto di Ravenna) is an Italian seaport on the North Adriatic Sea in Ravenna, Italy. It is one of the top twenty Italian ports and top forty European ports.

== Overview ==
The port of Ravenna is the main port of Emilia-Romagna. The European Commission has appointed the Ravenna seaport the "core port" of the Trans-European Transport Networks (TEN-T) Networks.

The docks are mainly on a canal that connects the town centre of Ravenna (which is inland) to the sea, which is 12 kilometres (7.5 miles) away. The offshore breakwaters are in the little towns of Porto Corsini and Marina di Ravenna.

It hosts shipyards, multipurpose terminals, bulk cargo terminals and a containerized cargo terminal. There are also a big passenger and cruise lines terminal and the biggest marinas of the Adriatic Sea. There are regular ferry lines to Catania, Brindisi, and Igoumenitsa.

== History ==
It was established thousands of years ago. In fact the Ravenna military and trade seaports are pictured in the opposite walls of S. Apollinare Nuovo, a church built in Ravenna by Theodoric the Great.

In 31 BC, Emperor Augustus founded near Ravenna the military harbor of Classe. It hosted the second imperial fleet of the Roman Empire (according to Vegetius, Epitome of Military Science fourth book - the first one was located in Portus Julius near Capo Miseno near the Port of Naples) Even after the Empire's decline in the 5th century, the port kept active and entered a further golden age during the Byzantine dominion as the mosaics bear witness.

It underwent decline after being flooded by the mud of the rivers and conquered by Venice in the 15th century. In 1738, the Corsini Canal (named after Pope Clement XII), connecting Ravenna to the sea, started up its activity.

The United States Navy established a naval air station at Porto Corsini on 24 July 1918 to operate seaplanes during World War I. The base closed shortly after the First Armistice at Compiègne.

After World War II a huge petrochemical plant was established, but the oil crisis of 1973 enhanced its multipurpose trade facilities.

In 2021, Ravenna's Port Authority awarded Royal Caribbean Cruise Line to build a two-berth cruise terminal and expected to be completed Spring 2024.
