= Hiroden Miyajima Line =

Tram line in Hiroshima, Japan

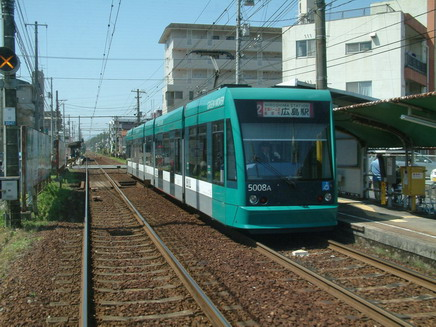
Hiroden Miyajima Line

The Miyajima Line (宮島線, Miyajima-sen) is a 16.1-kilometre-long light rail line operated by Hiroshima Electric Railway (Hiroden) connecting Hiroshima and Hatsukaichi, Hiroshima Prefecture, Japan. It has been operated since 1922.

Due to historical reasons, the line is the only Hiroden line classified as a "railway" under the Railway Business Act, whereas other lines are classified as "tramways" under the Tramway Act. The line operated exclusively as a railway with high floor trains until 1958 when through operations were established and trams started operating between Hiroden City Tram lines and the Miyajima Line. Today, despite its distinction from other part of the system, most trains on the line are through services from the tramway section, namely the Main Line which is connected to Hiroshima Station.

Line	Total distance	Route	Stations
█ Miyajima Line	16.1 km		21

== Stations ==
No.	Station	km	Routes	Connections	Location
M18	Hiroden-nishi-hiroshima (Koi)	0.0		█ Hiroden Main Line █ JR Sanyo Main Line (at JR Nishi-Hiroshima Station)	Nishi-ku, Hiroshima
M19	Higashi-takasu	1.0			Nishi-ku, Hiroshima
M20	Takasu	1.4			Nishi-ku, Hiroshima
M21	Furue	2.1			Nishi-ku, Hiroshima
M22	Kusatsu	2.9			Nishi-ku, Hiroshima
M23	Kusatsu-minami	3.5			Nishi-ku, Hiroshima
M24	Shoko Center-iriguchi	4.2		█ JR Sanyo Main Line (at JR Shin-Inokuchi Station)	Nishi-ku, Hiroshima
M25	Inokuchi	4.8			Nishi-ku, Hiroshima
M26	Shudai-kyoso-chuko-mae	6.0			Nishi-ku, Hiroshima
M27	Hiroden-itsukaichi	6.6		█ JR Sanyo Main Line (at JR Itsukaichi Station)	Saeki-ku, Hiroshima
M28	Saeki-kuyakusho-mae (Saeki Ward Office)	7.2			Saeki-ku, Hiroshima
M29	Rakurakuen	8.2			Saeki-ku, Hiroshima
M30	Sanyo-jogakuen-mae	9.2			Hatsukaichi
M31	Hiroden-hatsukaichi	9.9		█ JR Sanyo Main Line (at JR Hatsukaichi Station)	Hatsukaichi
M32	Hatsukaichi-shiyakusho-mae (Hera)	10.7			Hatsukaichi
M33	Miyauchi	11.5		█ JR Sanyo Main Line (at JR Miyauchikushido Station)	Hatsukaichi
M34	JA Hiroshimabyoin-mae	11.9			Hatsukaichi
M35	Jigozen	12.4			Hatsukaichi
M36	Ajina-higashi	13.9			Hatsukaichi
M37	Hiroden-ajina	14.6		█ JR Sanyo Main Line (at JR Ajina Station)	Hatsukaichi
M37-1	Miyajima Boat Race Jō (temporary stop)				Hatsukaichi
M38	Hiroden-miyajima-guchi	16.1		█ JR Sanyo Main Line (at JR Miyajimaguchi Station) █ JR Miyajima Ferry and Miyajima Matsudai Kisen ferries for Miyajima	Hatsukaichi
