= Nishi-Hiroshima Station =

Railway station in Hiroshima, Japan

Nishi-Hiroshima Station 西広島駅
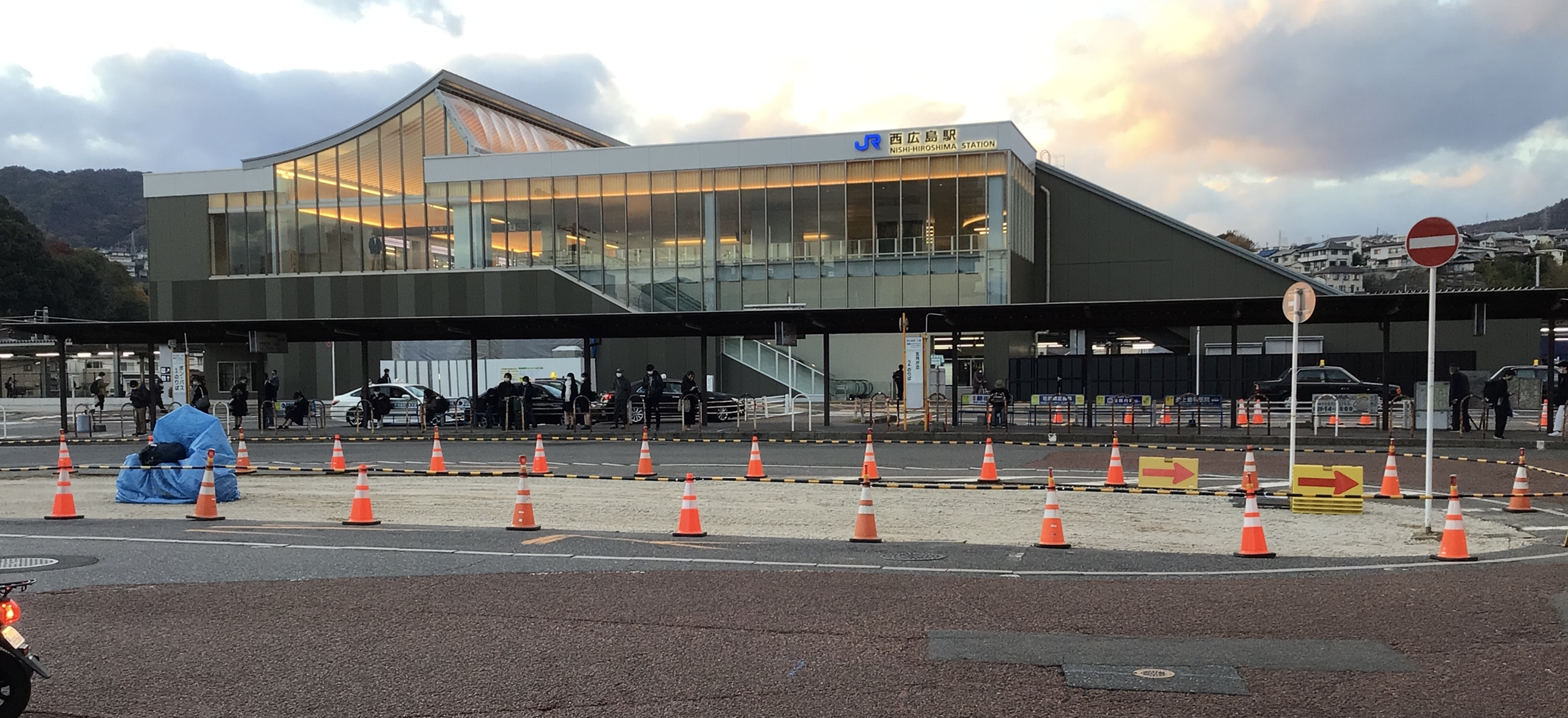
- Nishi-Hiroshima Station, December 2022

General information
- Location: 1-chōme-11 Koihonmachi, Nishi-ku, Hiroshima-shi, Hiroshima-ken, 733-0812; Japan
- Coordinates: 34°23′52.2″N 132°25′40.72″E
- Owner: West Japan Railway Company
- Operator: West Japan Railway Company
- Line: R Sanyō Main Line
- Distance: 310.7 km (193.1 miles) from Kobe
- Platforms: 1 side + 1 island platform
- Tracks: 3
- Connections: Bus stop

Construction
- Structure type: At-grade
- Accessible: Yes

Other information
- Status: Staffed
- Station code: JR-R04
- Website: Official website

History
- Opened: 25 September 1897; 128 years ago
- Rebuilt: 2019–2022
- Former names: Koi (to 1969)

Passengers
- FY2019: 9,399

Services
Preceding station	JR West	Following station
Shin-Inokuchi towards Iwakuni	San'yō Line Rapid	Yokogawa towards Hiroshima
Shin-Inokuchi towards Iwakuni	San'yō Line Local	Yokogawa towards Hiroshima
Location
- Location within Hiroshima Prefecture Location within Japan

Nishi-Hiroshima Station (西広島駅, Nishi-Hiroshima-eki) is a passenger railway station located in Nishi-ku in the city of Hiroshima, Hiroshima Prefecture, Japan. It is operated by the West Japan Railway Company (JR West). The station connects to Hiroden-nishi-hiroshima Station on the Hiroden Lines.

== Lines ==
Nishi-Hiroshima Station is served by the JR West Sanyō Main Line, and is located 310.7 kilometers from the terminus of the line at Kobe.

== Station layout ==
The station consists of one ground-level side platform and one island platform connected by an elevated station building. The station is staffed.

== Platforms ==
1, 2	■ R Sanyō Main Line	for Miyajimaguchi and Iwakuni
2, 3	■ R Sanyō Main Line	for Hiroshima and Mihara

== History ==
Nishi-Hiroshima Station was opened on 25 September 1897 as Koi Station (己斐駅) on the San'yo Railway, when the line was extended from Hiroshima to Tokuyama. The line was nationalised in 1906 and became the San'yo Main Line in 1909. The station name was changed to "Nishi-Hiroshima Station" in 1969. With the privatization of the Japan National Railway (JNR) on 1 April 1987, the station came under the aegis of the West Japan railway Company (JR West). The new station building started construction in 2019 and was opened for service on 19 December 2022.

== Passenger statistics ==
In fiscal 2019, the station was used by an average of 9,399 passengers daily.

== Surrounding area ==
- Hiroshima City Nishi Ward Office
- Hiroshima Institute of Technology College
- Notre Dame Seishin Junior and Senior High School

=== Hiroden ===
- █ Main Line / █ Miyajima Line
  - Line #2
    - Fukushima-cho — Hiroden-nishi-hiroshima Station — Higashi-takasu
- █ Main Line
  - Line #3
    - Hiroden-nishi-hiroshima Station — Higashi-takasu

== See also ==
- List of railway stations in Japan
