= Hiroshima Sun Plaza =

Arena in Hiroshima, Japan

Coordinates: 34.370353°N 132.394577°E

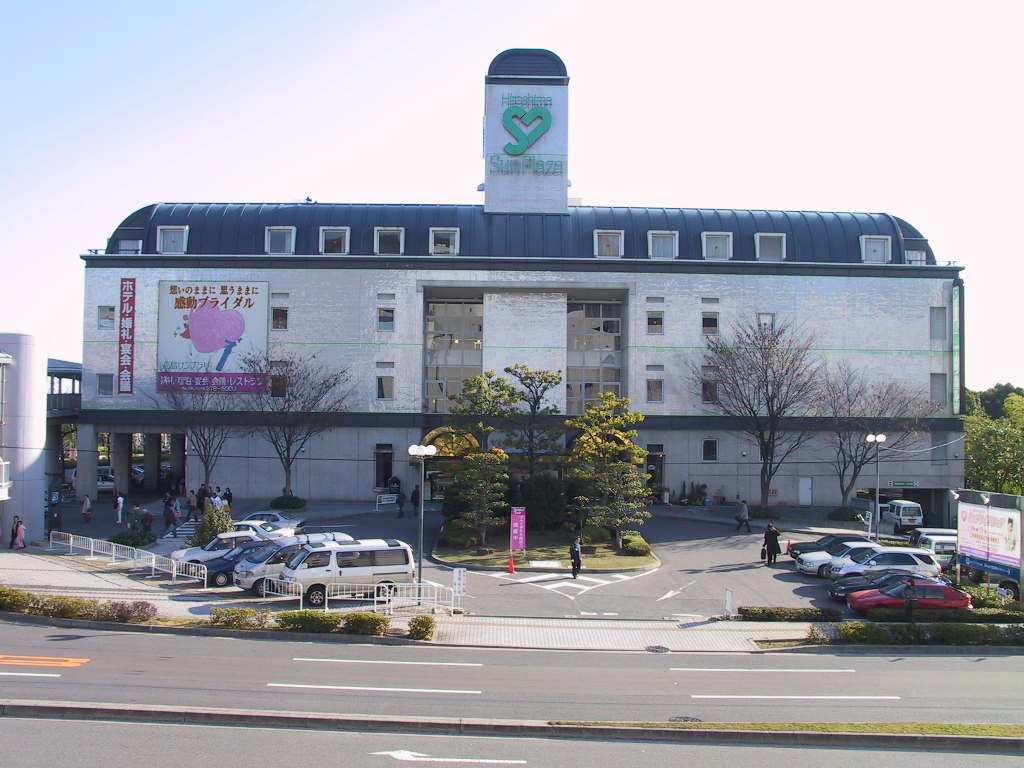
- Interactive map of Hiroshima Sun Plaza
- Location: 1-1, Shoko Center 3-chome, Nishi-ku, Hiroshima
- Owner: Hiroshima City
- Operator: Hiroshima City Industrial Promotion Center
- Capacity: 6,052 fixed seats:3,040 movable seats:3,000 seats for disabled people:12

Construction
- Opened: September, 1985
- Renovated: 2011

Tenants
- Hiroshima Dragonflies; 2011 FIVB Women's World Cup

Website
- http://www.hiroshima-sunplaza.or.jp/

Hiroshima Sun Plaza (広島サンプラザ) is an arena in Hiroshima, Japan. With a capacity of 6,052, it is primarily used for indoor sports and concerts. In addition, the annual Seijin shiki (the Japanese coming-of-age ceremony) is held there every January, sponsored by the Hiroshima City government.

== Facilities ==
- Hiroshima Sun Plaza Hall - Main hall
- Sub hall - gymnasium
- Banquet halls for Wedding ceremonies and Conferences
- Accommodations
- Restaurant

== Access ==
- Public transportation
  - from JR Shin-Inokuchi Station.
  - from Hiroden Shoko Center-iriguchi Station.
  - from Alpark Bus Terminal.
  - from Hiroshima Bus Center.
