= Shudai-kyoso-chuko-mae Station =

Railway station in Hiroshima, Japan

Coordinates: 34.3681°N 132.3748°E

Shudai-kyoso-chuko-mae 修大協創中高前
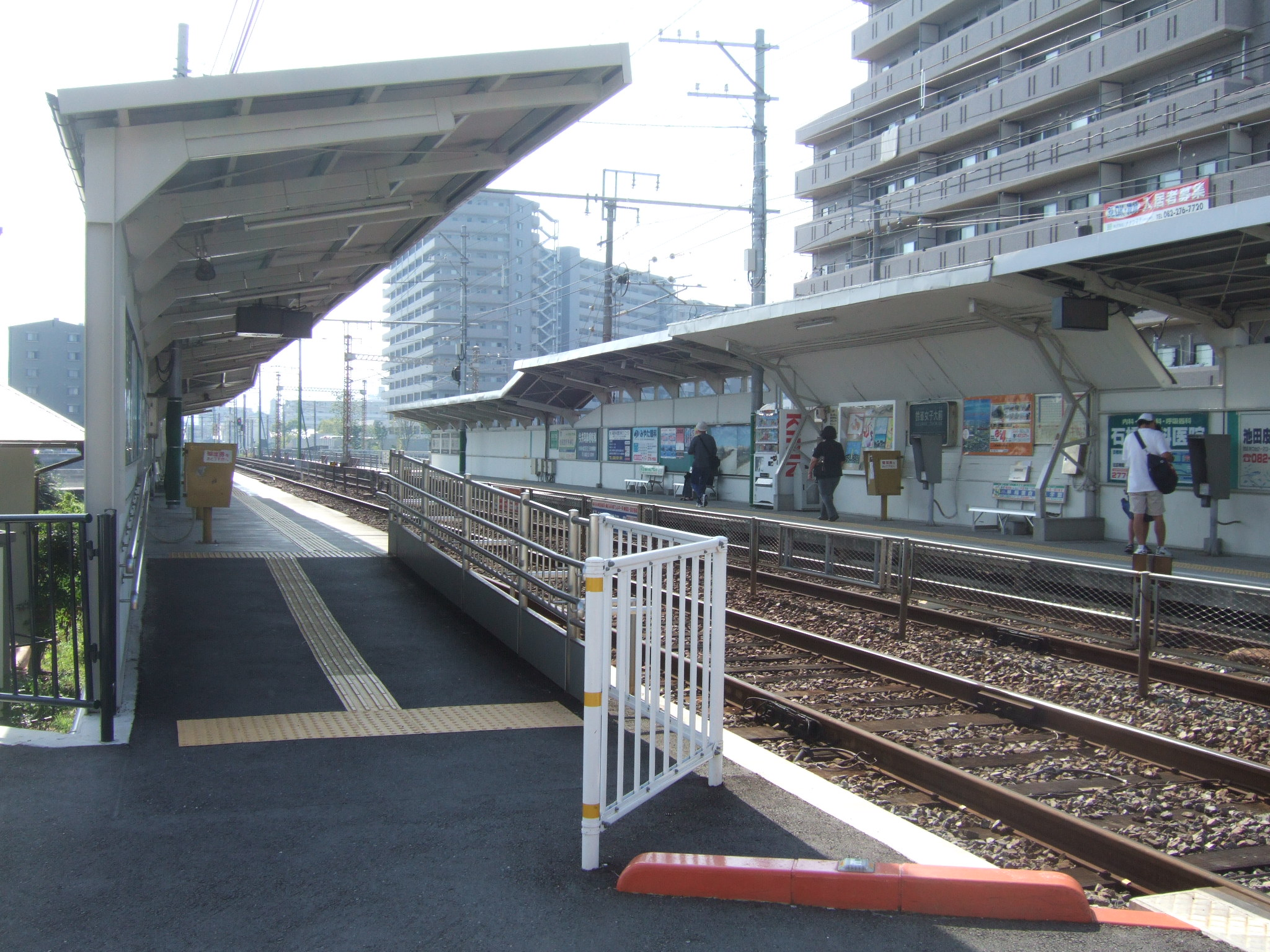

General information
- Location: 4-23-1, Inokuchi, Nishi-ku, Hiroshima; Japan
- Operator: Hiroshima Electric Railway
- Lines: Hiroden █ Miyajima Line; Route

Other information
- Station code: M27

History
- Opened: July 4, 1941
- Former names: Shudaifuzoku-suzugamine-mae (until 2019)
Location

Shudai-kyoso-chuko-mae Station (修大協創中高前, Shūdai Kyōsō Chūkō mae eki) is a train station on the Hiroden Miyajima Line located in Inokuchi, Nishi-ku, Hiroshima.

== Routes ==
- Hiroshima Station - Hiroden-miyajima-guchi Route

== Connections ==
█ Miyajima Line

Inokuchi — Shudai-kyoso-chuko-mae — Hiroden-itsukaichi

== Around station ==
- Suzugamine Women's College
- Suzugamine Girls' Junior High School & High School
- Hiroshima Municipal Suzugamine Elementary School
- Hiroshima Institute of Technology Senior High School

== History ==
- Opened as "Jissen-jogakkō-mae" on July 4, 1941.
- Renamed to "Suzugamine-josen-mae" on April 1, 1947.
- Renamed to "Suzugamine-joshidai-mae" on April 1, 1950.
- Renamed to "Shudaifuzoku-suzugamine-mae" on April 1, 2015.
- Renamed to "Shudai-kyoso-chuko-mae" on April 1, 2019.

== See also ==
- Hiroden lines and routes
