= Hatsukaichi Station =

Railway station in Hatsukaichi, Hiroshima Prefecture, Japan

Hatsukaichi Station 廿日市駅
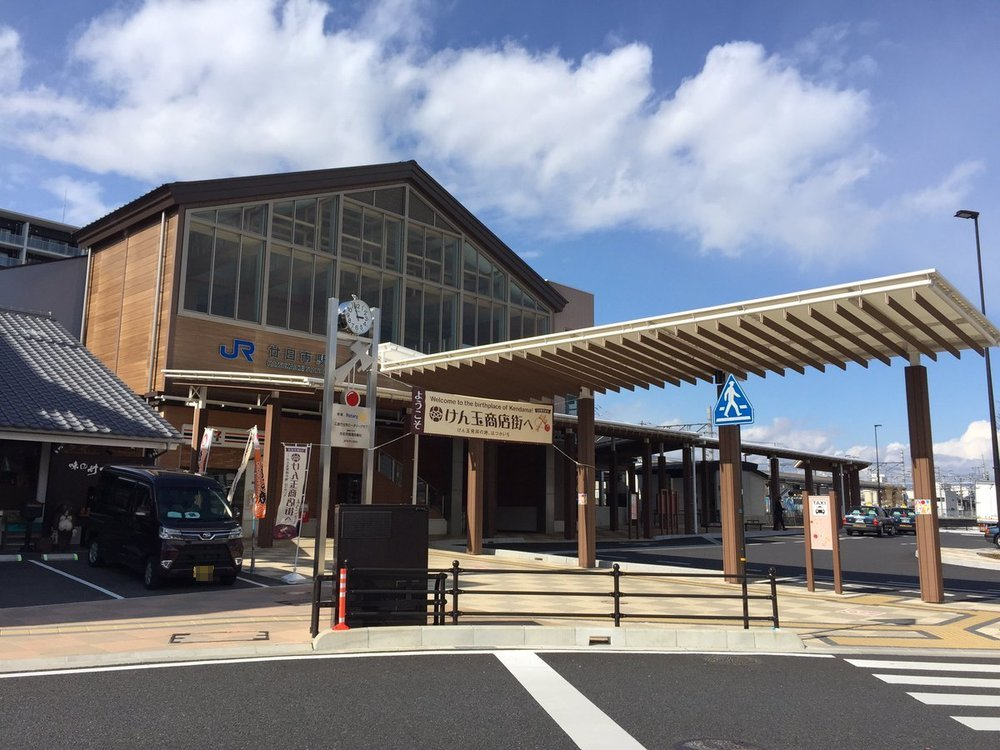
- Hatsukaichi Station, September 2006

General information
- Location: 1 Ekimae, Hatsukaichi-shi, Hiroshima-ken 738-0011; Japan
- Coordinates: 34°21′28.21″N 132°20′8.37″E
- Owner: West Japan Railway Company
- Operator: West Japan Railway Company
- Line: R Sanyō Main Line
- Distance: 320.2 km (199.0 miles) from Kobe
- Platforms: 2 side platforms
- Tracks: 2
- Connections: Miyajima Line at Hiroden-hatsukaichi Station

Construction
- Structure type: Elevated
- Accessible: Yes

Other information
- Status: Staffed (Midori no Madoguchi )
- Station code: JR-R08
- Website: Official website

History
- Opened: 25 September 1897

Passengers
- FY2019: 4064

Services
Preceding station	JR West	Following station
Miyauchi-Kushido towards Iwakuni	San'yō Line Local	Itsukaichi towards Hiroshima
Location
- Location within Hiroshima Prefecture Location within Japan

Hatsukaichi Station (廿日市駅, Hatsukaichi-eki) is a passenger railway station located in the city of Hatsukaichi, Hiroshima Prefecture, Japan. It is operated by the West Japan Railway Company (JR West).

== Lines ==
Hatsukaichi Station is served by the JR West Sanyō Main Line, and is located 320.2 kilometers from the terminus of the line at Kobe.

== Station layout ==
The station consists of two opposed ground-level side platforms, connected by an elevated station building. The station has a Midori no Madoguchi staffed ticket office. Although the station building is steel-framed, the interior and exterior design is conscious of the town of woodwork, which is a rare design for station buildings in the suburbs of Hiroshima.

== Platforms ==
1	■ R Sanyō Main Line	for Miyajimaguchi and Iwakuni
2	■ R Sanyō Main Line	for Hiroshima and Mihara

== History ==
Hatsukaichi Station was on 25 September 1897 on the San'yo Railway, with the opening of the line extension from Hiroshima to Tokuyama. The line was nationalized in 1906 and became the San'yo Main Line in 1909. With the privatization of the Japan National Railway (JNR) on 1 April 1987, the station came under the aegis of the West Japan railway Company (JR West).

== Passenger statistics ==
In fiscal 2019, the station was used by an average of 4064 passengers daily.

== Surrounding area ==
- Sanyo Women's Junior College
- Sanyo Jogakuen Junior and Senior High School
- Hiroshima Prefectural Hatsukaichi High School
- Hatsukaichi Tenmangu Shrine
- Hiroden-hatsukaichi Station is located to the south from JR Hatsukaichi Station, 3 minutes walk from the station.

=== Hiroden ===
█ Miyajima Line
Line #2

Sanyo-joshidai-mae — Hiroden-hatsukaichi — Hatsukaichi-shiyakusyo-mae

== See also ==
- List of railway stations in Japan
