= Shin-Inokuchi Station =

Railway station in Nishi-ku, Hiroshima Prefecture, Japan

Shin-Inokuchi Station 新井口駅
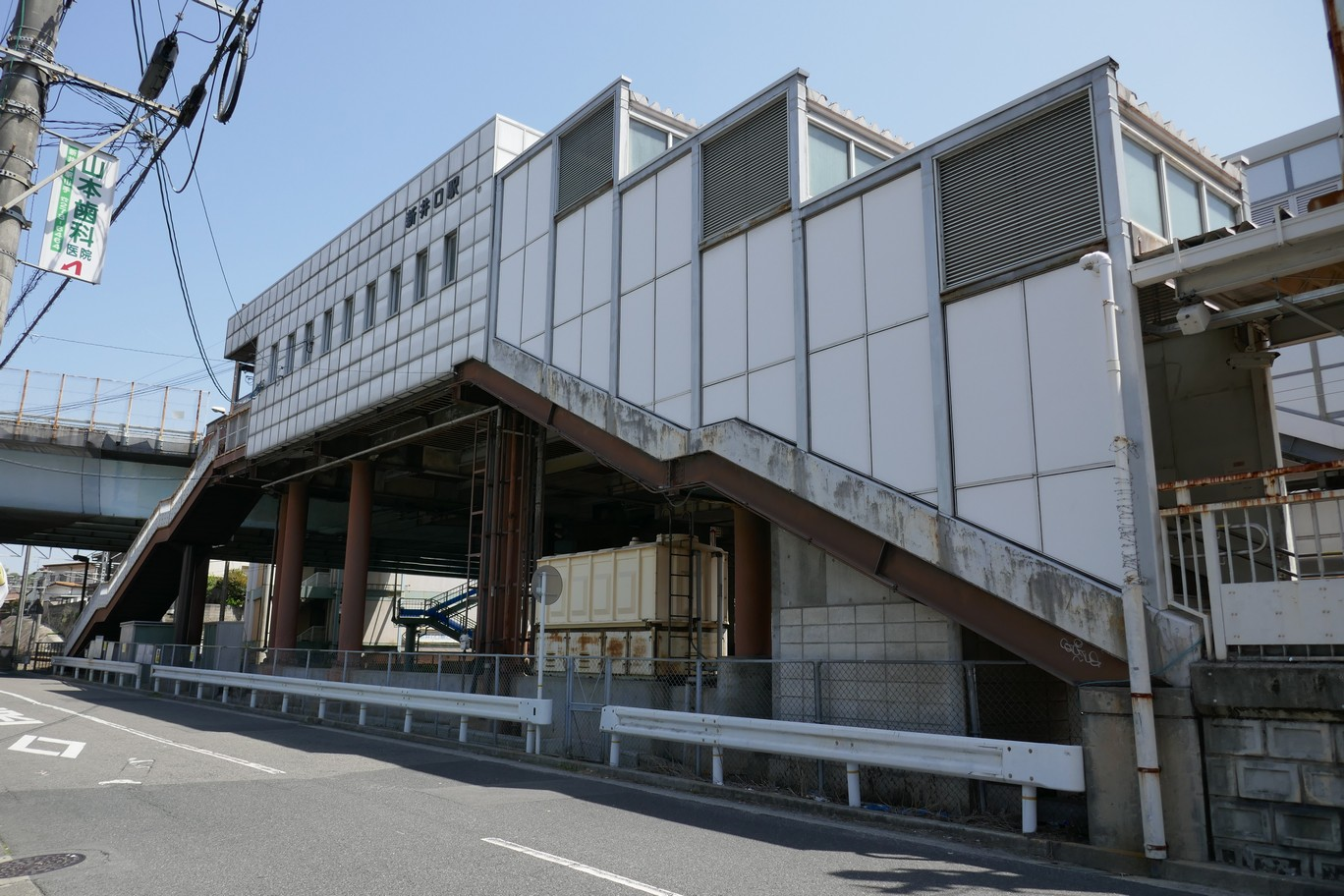
- Shin-Inokuchi Station, April 2019

General information
- Location: 1 Chome-30-1 Inokuchi, Nishi-ku, Hiroshima-shi, Hiroshima-ken 733-0842; Japan
- Coordinates: 34°22′32.59″N 132°23′31.34″E
- Owner: West Japan Railway Company
- Operator: West Japan Railway Company
- Line: R Sanyō Main Line
- Distance: 314.4 km (195.4 miles) from Kobe
- Platforms: 2 side platforms
- Tracks: 2
- Connections: Hiroden Shoko Center-iriguchi Station

Construction
- Structure type: Elevated
- Accessible: Yes

Other information
- Status: Staffed
- Station code: JR-R05
- Website: Official website

History
- Opened: 14 March 1985; 41 years ago

Passengers
- FY2019: 8188

Services
Preceding station	JR West	Following station
Itsukaichi towards Iwakuni	San'yō Line Rapid	Nishi-Hiroshima towards Hiroshima
Itsukaichi towards Iwakuni	San'yō Line Local	Nishi-Hiroshima towards Hiroshima
Location
- Location within Hiroshima Prefecture Location within Japan

Shin-Inokuchi Station (新井口駅, Shin-Inokuchi-eki) is a passenger railway station located in Nishi-kuku in the city of Hiroshima, Hiroshima Prefecture, Japan. It is operated by the West Japan Railway Company (JR West). The station connects to Hiroden-itsukaichi Station on the Hiroden Lines.

== Lines ==
Shin-Inokuchi Station is served by the JR West Sanyō Main Line, and is located 314.4 kilometers from the terminus of the line at Kobe.

== Station layout ==
The station consists of two opposed side platforms connected by an elevated station building. The station is staffed.

== Platforms ==
1	■ R Sanyō Main Line	for Miyajimaguchi and Iwakuni
2	■ R Sanyō Main Line	for Hiroshima and Kure

== History ==
Shin-Inokuchi Station was opened on 14 March 1985. With the privatization of the Japan National Railway (JNR) on 1 April 1987, the station came under the aegis of the West Japan railway Company (JR West).

== Passenger statistics ==
In fiscal 2019, the station was used by an average of 8188 passengers daily.

== Surrounding area ==
- Hiroshima Central Wholesale Market

=== Hiroden ===
- █ Miyajima Line
  - Line #2
    - Hiroden Nishi-hiroshima Station — Shoko Center-iriguchi — Inokuchi

== See also ==
- List of railway stations in Japan
