= Hiroden-nishi-hiroshima Station =

Tram/light rail station in Hiroshima, Japan

Coordinates: 34°23′49″N 132°25′41″E

Hiroden-nishi-hiroshima 広電西広島（己斐）
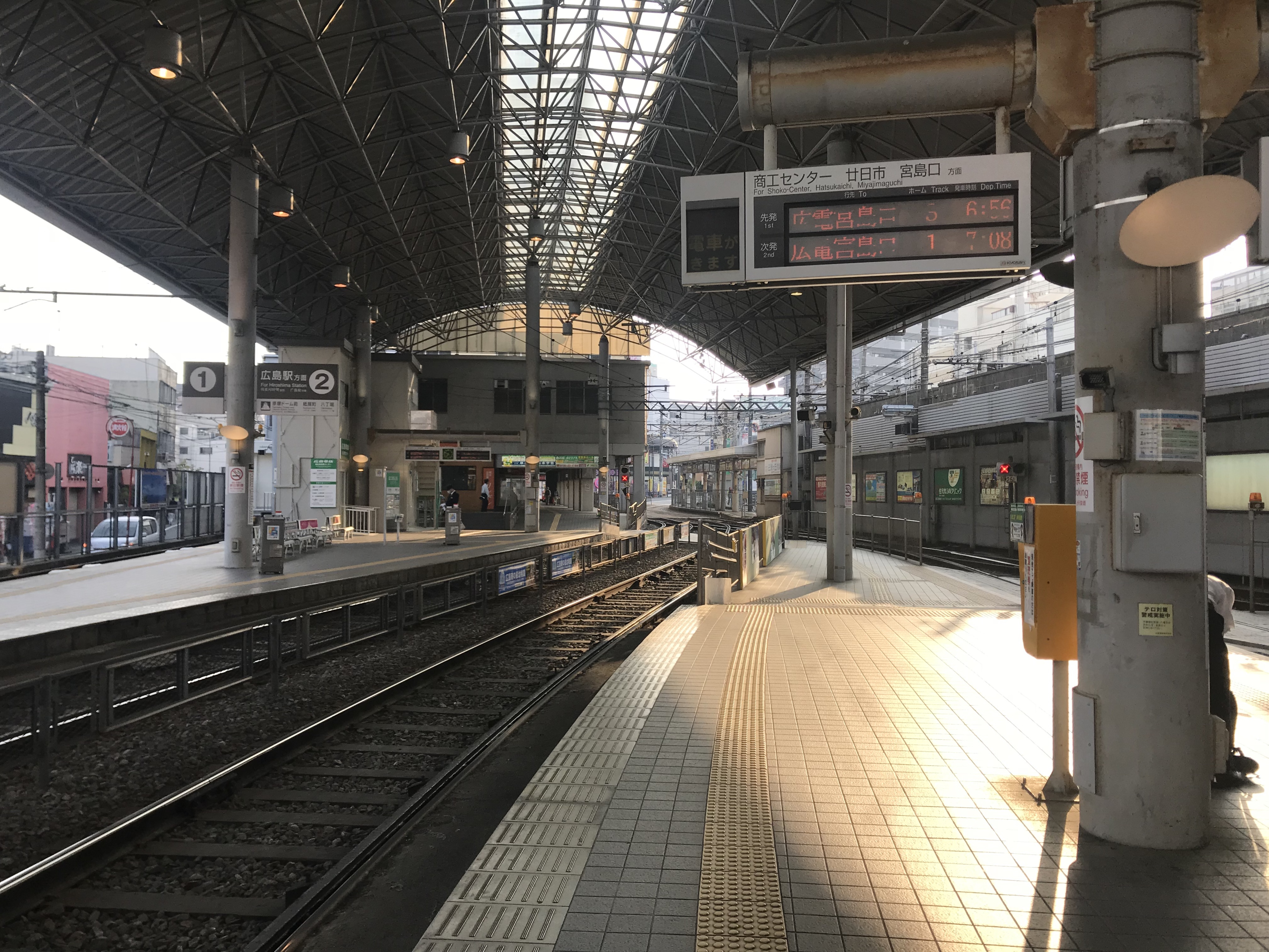

General information
- Location: 1-2527-2, Koi-honmachi, Nishi-ku, Hiroshima; Japan
- Operator: Hiroshima Electric Railway
- Lines: Hiroden █ Main Line and █ Miyajima Line; Route
- Connections: █ Sanyo Main Line at Nishi-Hiroshima Station

Other information
- Station code: M19

History
- Opened: December 8, 1912
Location

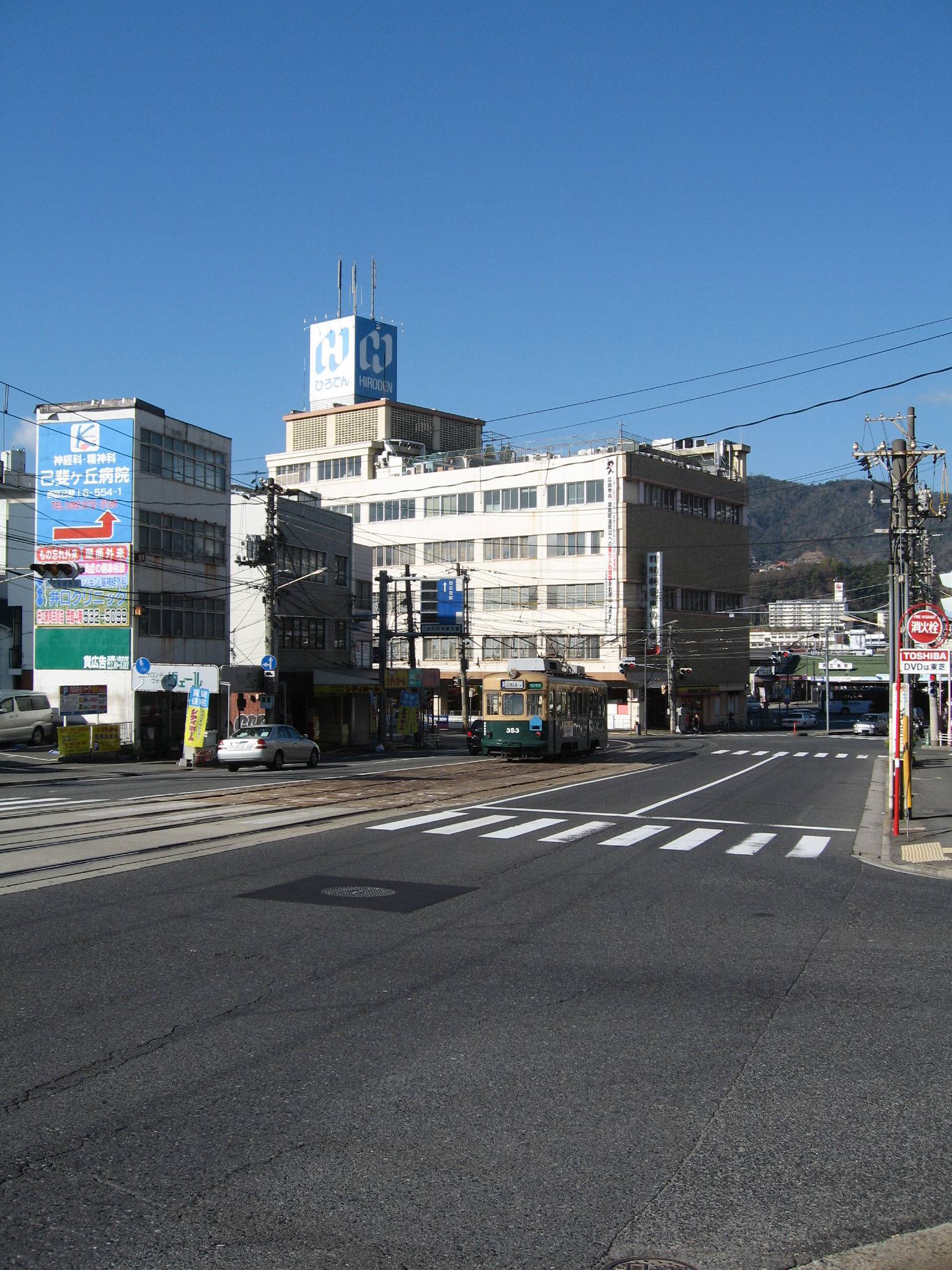
A tram arriving at the station after crossing the Ōta River

Hiroden-Nishi-Hiroshima Station (Japanese: 広電西広島駅) is a Hiroden terminal station on Hiroden Main Line and Hiroden Miyajima Line, located south side of the JR Nishi-Hiroshima Station in Koi-hon-machi, Nishi-ku, Hiroshima.

== Routes ==
From Nishi-hiroshima Station, there are two of Hiroden Streetcar routes.

- Hiroshima Station - Hiroden-miyajima-guchi Route
  - Most trains goes straight through from each side.
- Hiroden-nishi-hiroshima - Hiroshima Port Route

== Platforms ==
- No.1 for Hiroden-miyajima-guchi (#2, Miyajiam Line)
- No.2 for Hiroshima Station (#2, Main Line)
- No.3 for Hiroden-miyajima-guchi (#2, Miyajiam Line)
- No.4 for Hiroshima Port (departure) (#3, Main Line)
- No.5 from Hiroshima Port (arrival)
- No.6 for Hiroden-honsha-mae or Hiroshima Port (for rush hours)
- No.7 (not used)

== Connections ==
█ Main Line / █ Miyajima Line

Fukushima-cho — Hiroden-nishi-hiroshima Station — Higashi-takasu

█ Main Line

Hiroden-nishi-hiroshima Station — Fukushima-cho

== Other services connections ==
=== JR lines ===
- JR lines connections at Nishi-Hiroshima Station

=== Bus services routes ===
- Bus services routes connections at Nishi-Hiroshima Station

== History ==
- Opened as "Koi" tram stop of Main Line for municipal connection on December 8, 1912.
- Opened as "Koi-machi" station of Miyajima Line for suburban connection on August 22, 1922.
- Renamed the station on Miyajima Line from "Koi-machi" to "Nishi-Hiroshima" on August 22, 1931.
- Started the through train operation to connect Main Line and Miyajima Line directly in 1962.
- Renamed the station on Miyajima Line from "Nishi-Hiroshima" to "Hiroden-Nishi-Hiroshima" on October 1, 1969.
- Started the through train operation for every trains in 1991.
- Rebuilt both "Koi" and "Hiroden-Nishi-Hiroshima" stations together as one station "Hiroden-nishi-hiroshima (Koi)" station on November 1, 2001.

== See also ==
- Hiroden lines and routes
