= Rakurakuen Station =

Railway station in Hiroshima, Japan

Coordinates: 34.3641°N 132.3521°E

Rakurakuen 楽々園
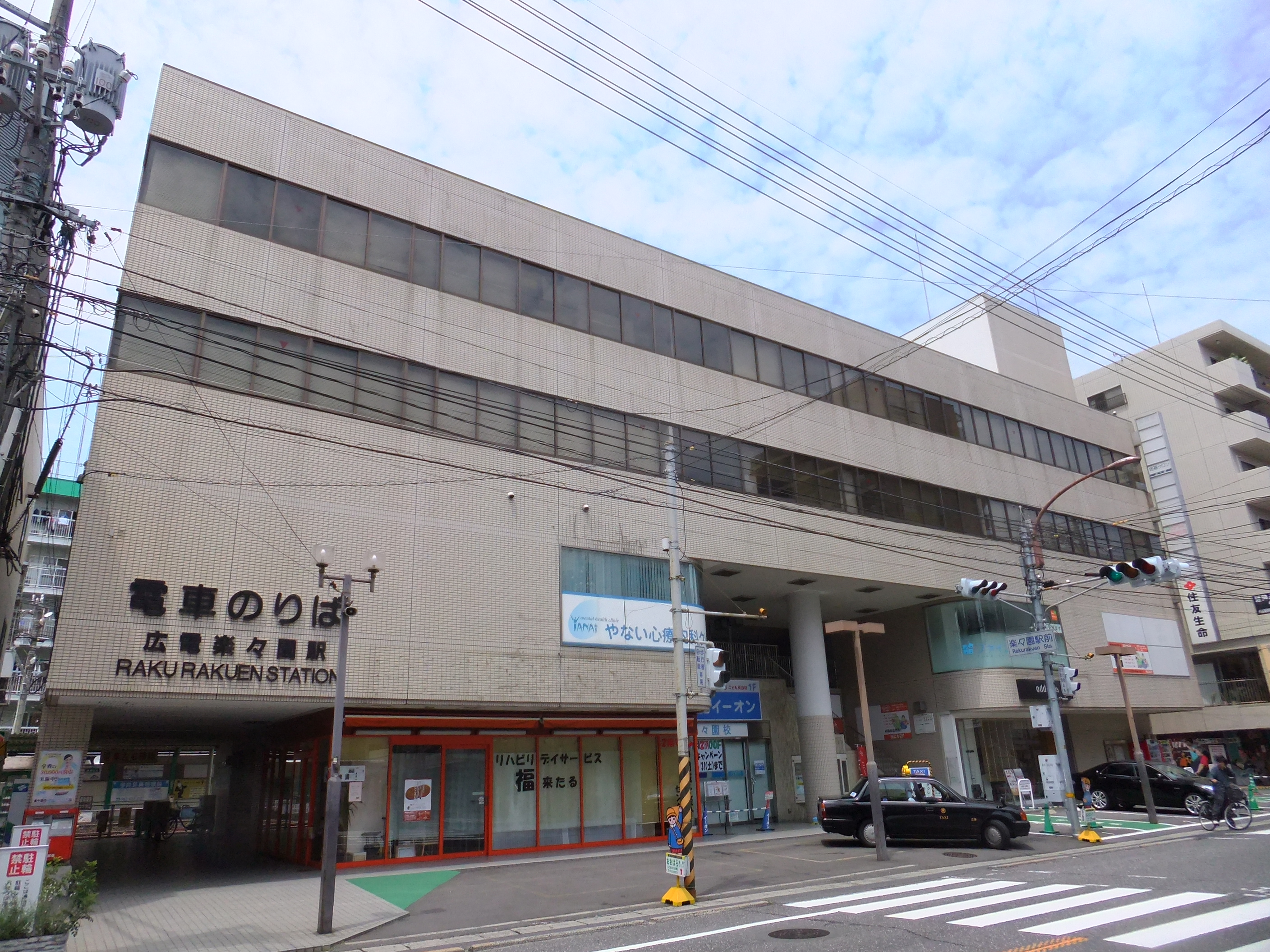

General information
- Location: 2-547-3, Rakurakuen, Saeki-ku, Hiroshima; Japan
- Operator: Hiroshima Electric Railway
- Lines: Hiroden █ Miyajima Line; Route

Other information
- Station code: M30

History
- Opened: December 1, 1935
Location

Rakurakuen is a Hiroden station on Hiroden Miyajima Line, located in Rakurakuen, Saeki-ku, Hiroshima. There was an amusement park called "Rakurakuen-yuenchi" operated by Hiroden.

== Routes ==
From Rakurakuen Station, there is one of Hiroden Streetcar routes.

- Hiroshima Station - Hiroden-miyajima-guchi Route

== Connections ==
█ Miyajima Line

Saeki-kuyakusyo-mae (Saeki Ward Office) — Rakurakuen — Sanyo-joshidai-mae

== Around station ==
- Hiroshima Institute of Technology
- Hiroshima Senior High School, Junior High School attached to H.I.T.
- Saeki-ku sports center

== History ==
- Opened as "Shiohama" on December 1, 1935.
- Renamed to "Rakurakuen" on September 8, 1936.
- Renamed to "Rakurakuen-yuenchi(amusement park)" on July 20, 1965.
- Renamed to "Rakurakuen" on September 1, 1971. - the amusement park was closed.

== See also ==
- Hiroden lines and routes
