= Takasu Station =

Takasu Station may refer to:

- Takasu Station (Hiroshima), a railway station in Hiroshima, Japan
- Takasu Station (Kōchi), a tramway station in Kōchi, Japan
