= Kusatsu Station (Hiroshima) =

Railway station in Hiroshima, Japan

Coordinates: 34°22′53″N 132°24′13″E

Kusatsu 草津
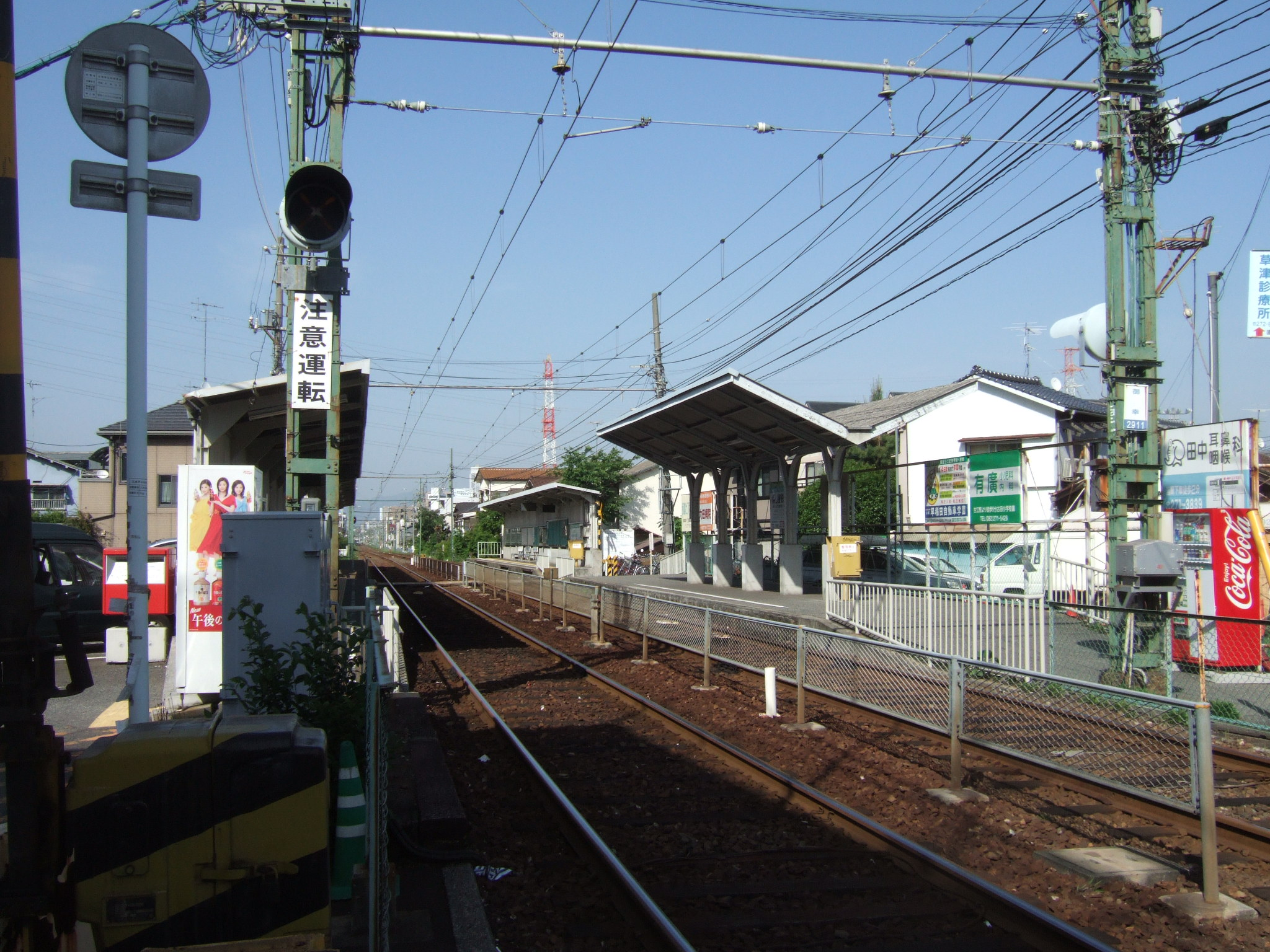

General information
- Location: 3-243-1, Kusatsu-higashi, Nishi-ku, Hiroshima; Japan
- Operator: Hiroshima Electric Railway
- Lines: Hiroden █ Miyajima Line; Route

Other information
- Station code: M23

History
- Opened: August 22, 1922
Location

Kusatsu is a Hiroden station on Hiroden Miyajima Line, located in Kusatsu-higashi, Nishi-ku, Hiroshima.

== Routes ==
From Kusatsu Station, there is one Hiroden streetcar route.

- Hiroshima Station - Hiroden-miyajima-guchi Route

== Connections ==
█ Miyajima Line

Furue — Kusatsu — Kusatsu-minami

== History ==
Opened as "Kusatsu-machi" on August 22, 1922.

== Nearby station ==
Hiroshima SME University - Organization for Small & Medium Enterprises and Regional Innovation, JAPAN

== See also ==
- Hiroden lines and routes
