= Shoko Center-iriguchi Station =

Railway station in Hiroshima, Japan

Coordinates: 34.3756°N 132.3921°E

Shoko Center-iriguchi 商工センター入口
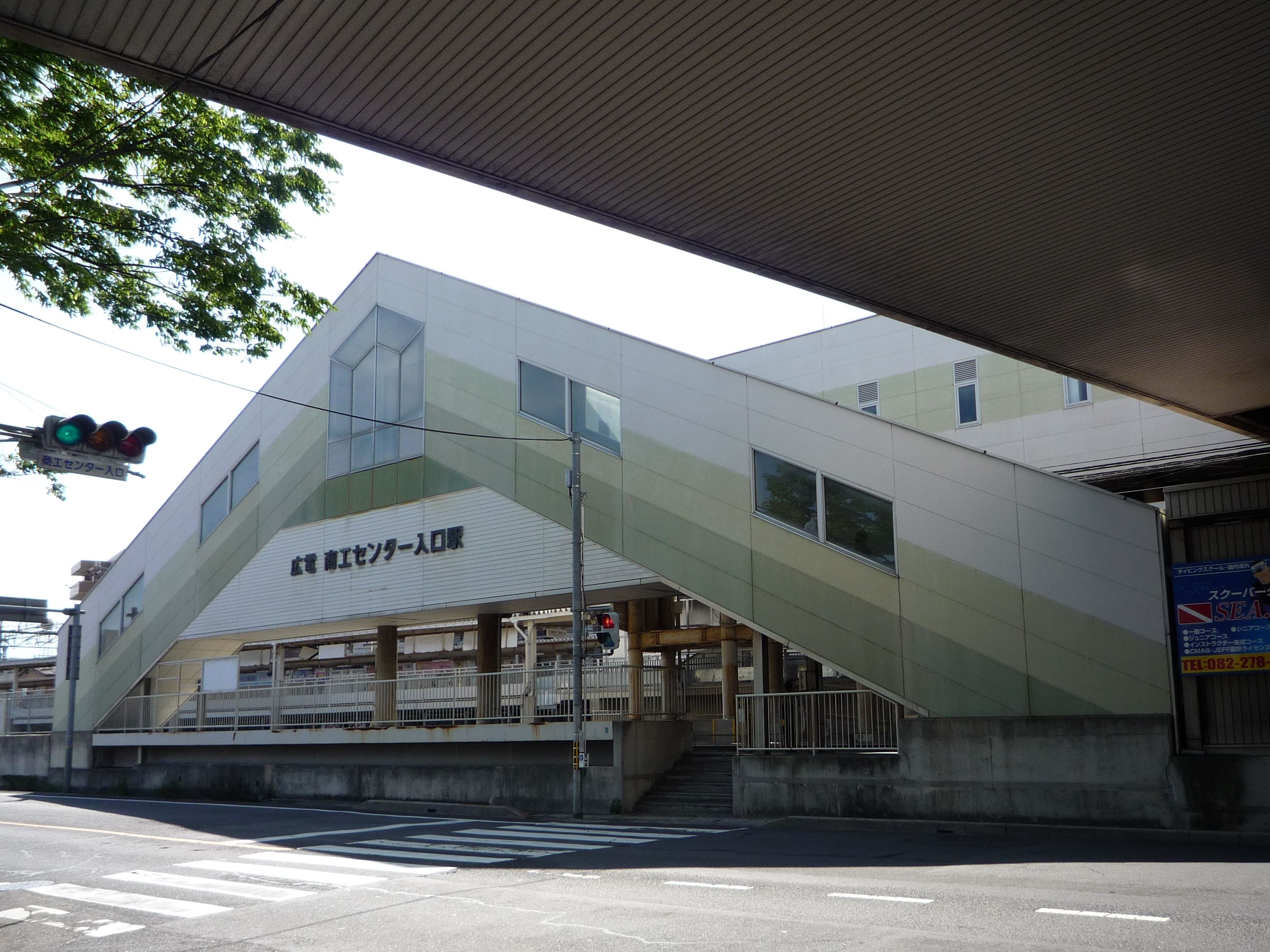

General information
- Location: 1-826-33, Inokuchi, Nishi-ku, Hiroshima; Japan
- Operator: Hiroshima Electric Railway
- Lines: Hiroden █ Miyajima Line; Route
- Connections: █ Sanyo Main Line at Shin-Inokuchi Station

Other information
- Station code: M25

History
- Opened: September 1, 1960
Location

Shoko Center-iriguchi is a Hiroden station on Hiroden Miyajima Line, located south side of the JR Shin-Inokuchi Station in Inokuchi, Nishi-ku, Hiroshima.

== Routes ==
From Hiroden-itsukaichi Station, there is one of Hiroden Streetcar routes.

- Hiroshima Station - Hiroden-miyajima-guchi Route

== Connections ==
█ Miyajima Line

Kusatsu-minami — Shoko Center-iriguchi — Inokuchi

== Other services connections ==
=== JR lines ===
- JR lines connections at JR Shin-Inokuchi Station

Shoko Center-iriguchi Station is directly connected to the JR Shin-Inokuchi Station by the stairs and pedestrian overpass.

=== Bus services routes ===
- Bus services routes connections at Shin-Inokuchi Station
- Bus services routes connections at Alpark Bus Terminal

== Around station ==
- Alpark
- Hiroshima Sun Plaza
- Hiroden Arate-shako - (streetcar shed)

== History ==
- Opened as "Inokuchi-byoin-mae" on September 1, 1960.
- Renamed to "Arate-shako-mae" in 1971.
- Renamed to the present station name "Shoko Center-iriguchi" on November 1, 1979.
- Connected to the pedestrian overpass between Alpark and JR Shin-Inokuchi Station on November 30, 1989.

== See also ==
- Hiroden lines and routes
