= Inokuchi Station =

Inokuchi Station is the name of two train stations in Japan:

- Inokuchi Station (Hiroshima)
- Inokuchi Station (Ishikawa)
