= Furue Station =

Railway station in Hiroshima, Japan

Coordinates: 34.3865°N 132.4114°E

Furue Station 古江
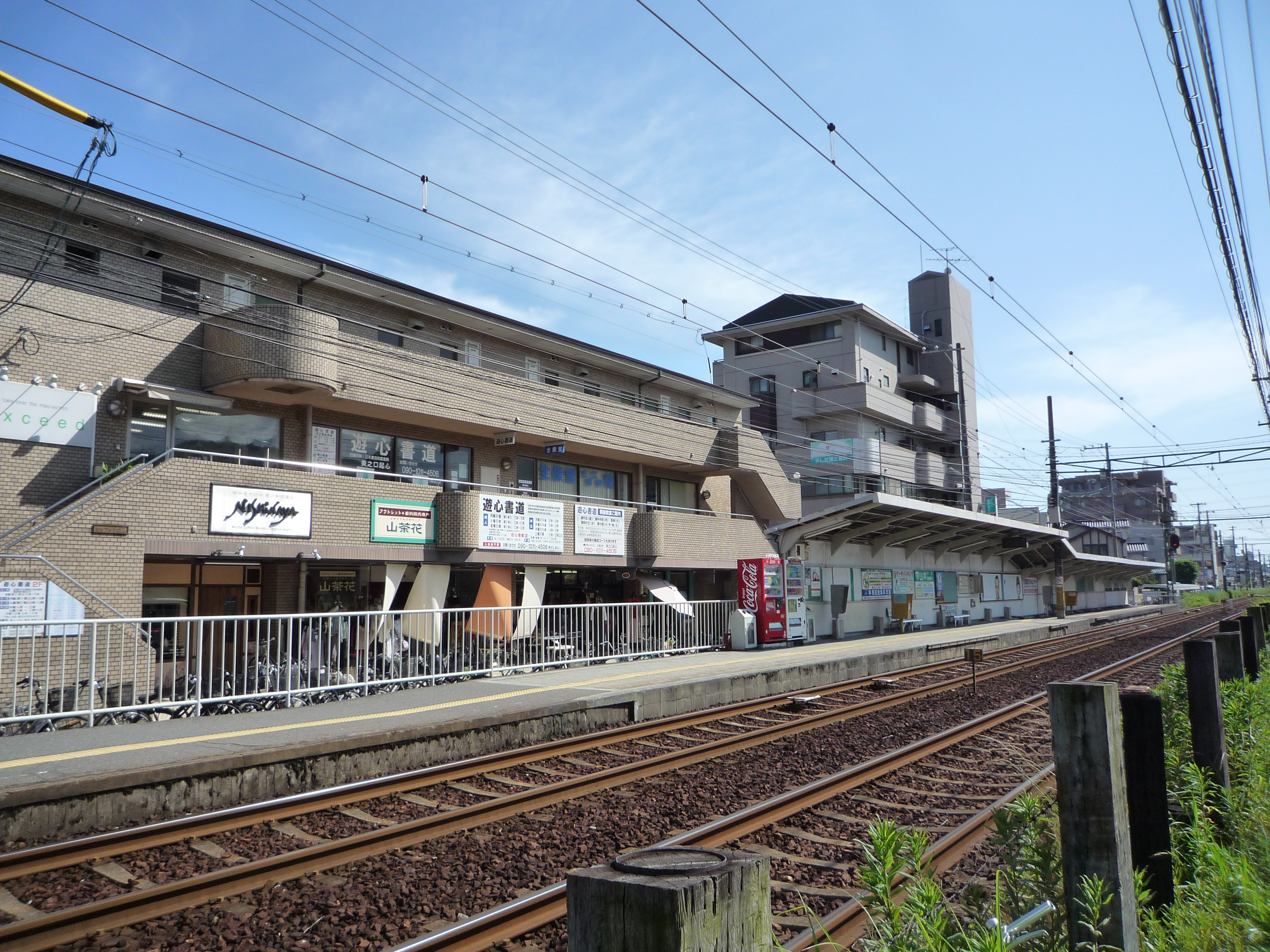
- Furue Station

General information
- Location: 977-6, Furue-higashi-machi, Nishi-ku, Hiroshima; Japan
- Operator: Hiroshima Electric Railway
- Lines: Hiroden █ Miyajima Line; Route

Other information
- Station code: M22

History
- Opened: August 22, 1922
Location

Furue is a Hiroden station on Hiroden Miyajima Line, located in Furue-higashi-machi, Nishi-ku, Hiroshima.

== Routes ==
From Furue Station, there is one of Hiroden Streetcar routes.

- Hiroshima Station - Hiroden-miyajima-guchi Route

== Connections ==
█ Miyajima Line

Takasu — Furue — Kusatsu

== Around station ==
- Hiroshima Gakuin Junior and Senior High School
- Miwa-myojin

== History ==
- Opened on August 22, 1922.

== See also ==
- Hiroden lines and routes
