= Kusatsu-minami Station =

Railway station in Hiroshima, Japan

Coordinates: 34.3782°N 132.3986°E

Kusatsu-minami 草津南
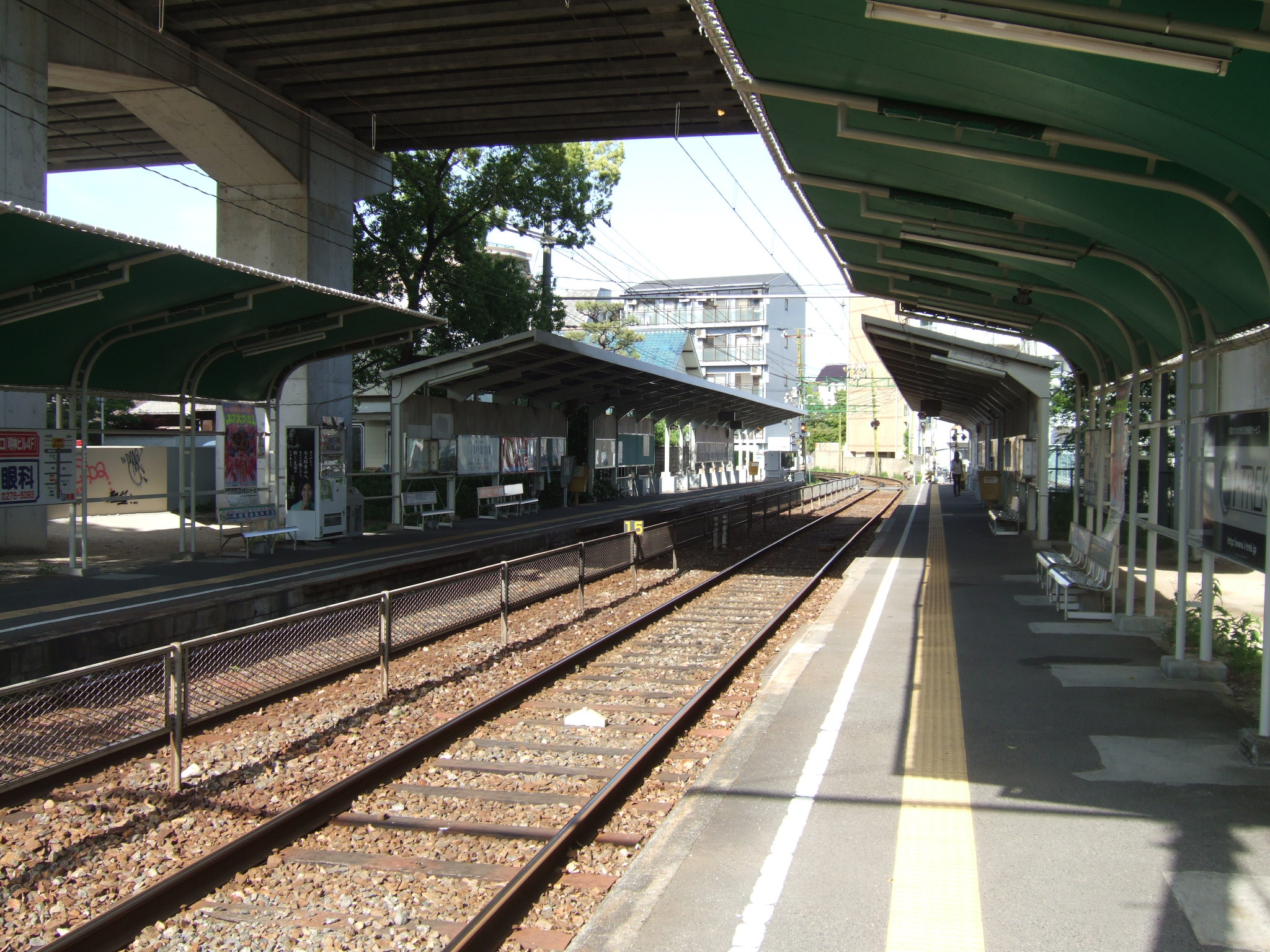

General information
- Location: 3-1848, Kusatsu-minami, Nishi-ku, Hiroshima; Japan
- Operator: Hiroshima Electric Railway
- Lines: Hiroden █ Miyajima Line; Route

Other information
- Station code: M24

History
- Opened: April 6, 1924
Location

Kusatsu-minami is a Hiroden station on Hiroden Miyajima Line, located in Kusatsu-minami, Nishi-ku, Hiroshima.

== Routes ==
From Kusatsu-minami Station, there is one of Hiroden Streetcar routes.

- Hiroshima Station - Hiroden-miyajima-guchi Route

== Connections ==
█ Miyajima Line

Kusatsu — Kusatsu-minami — Shoko Center-iriguchi

== Around station ==
- Hiroden Arate train shed
- Hiroshima City Central Wholesale Market
- Kusatcu Fishing Port - the birthplace of oyster culture

== History ==
- Opened as "Arate" on April 6, 1924.
- Renamed to "Chuo-ichiba-mae" on September 1, 1951.
- Renamed to the present name "Kusatsu-minami", on November 1, 1979.

== See also ==
- Hiroden lines and routes
