= Saekikuyakushomae Station =

Railway station in Hiroshima, Japan

Coordinates: 34.3653°N 132.3619°E

Saeki Ward Office 佐伯区役所前
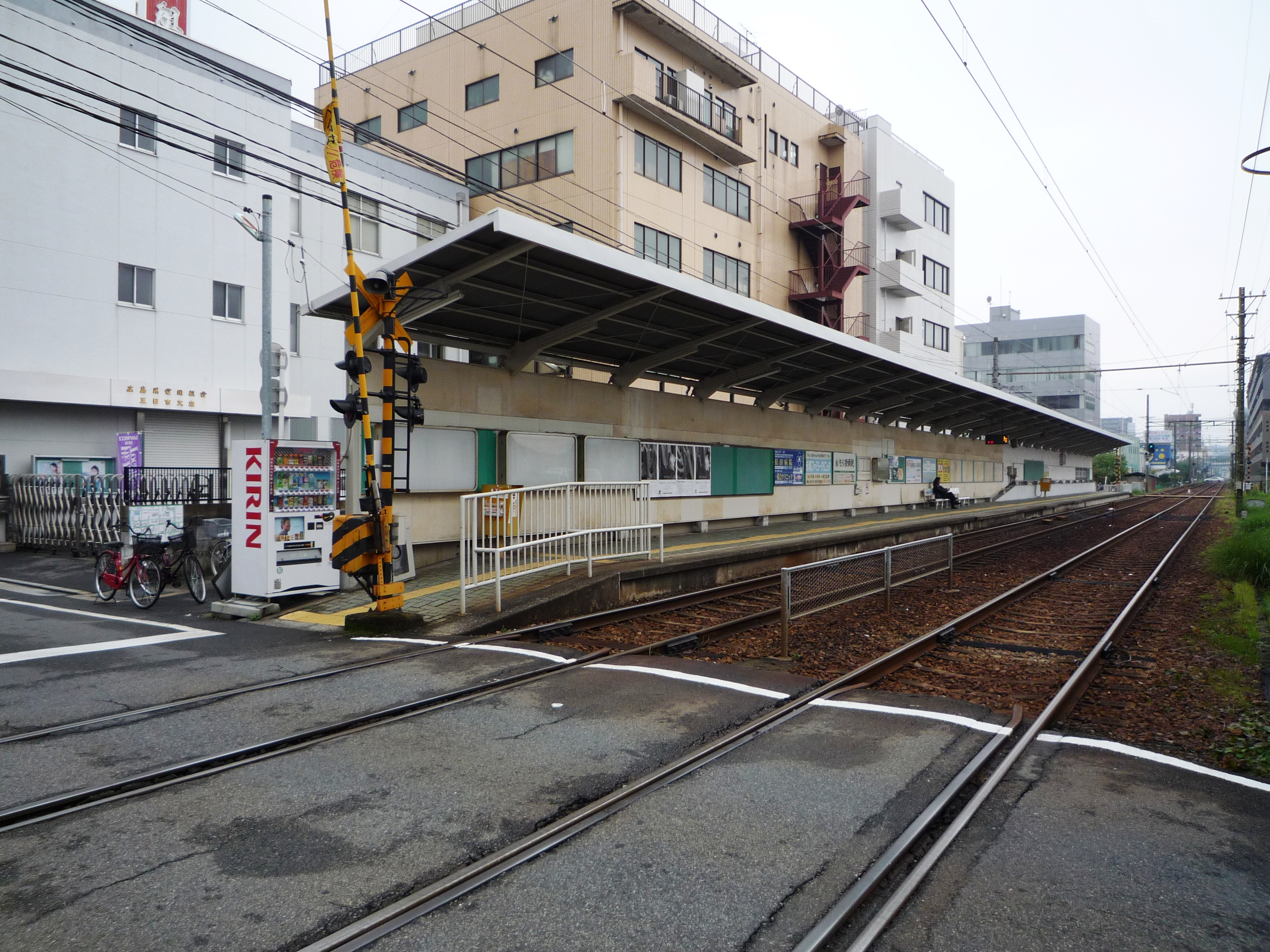
- Saekikuyakushomae Station

General information
- Location: 2-4-6, Kairoen, Saeki-ku, Hiroshima; Japan
- Operator: Hiroshima Electric Railway
- Lines: Hiroden █ Miyajima Line; Route

Other information
- Station code: M29

History
- Opened: March 27, 1987
Location

Saeki-kuyakusyo-mae (Saeki Ward Office) is a Hiroden station on Hiroden Miyajima Line, located in front of Saeki Ward Office, in Kairoen, Saeki-ku, Hiroshima.

== Routes ==
From Saeki-kuyakusyo-mae (Saeki Ward Office) Station, there is one of Hiroden Streetcar routes.

- Hiroshima Station - Hiroden-miyajima-guchi Route

== Connections ==
█ Miyajima Line

Hiroden-itsukaichi — Saeki-kuyakusyo-mae (Saeki Ward Office) — Rakurakuen

== Around station ==
- Hiroshima Saeki Ward Office

== History ==
- Opened on March 27, 1987.

== See also ==
- Hiroden lines and routes
