= Motoujina-guchi Station =

Tram stop in Hiroshima, Japan

Coordinates: 34°21′14″N 132°27′35″E

Motoujina-guchi 元宇品口
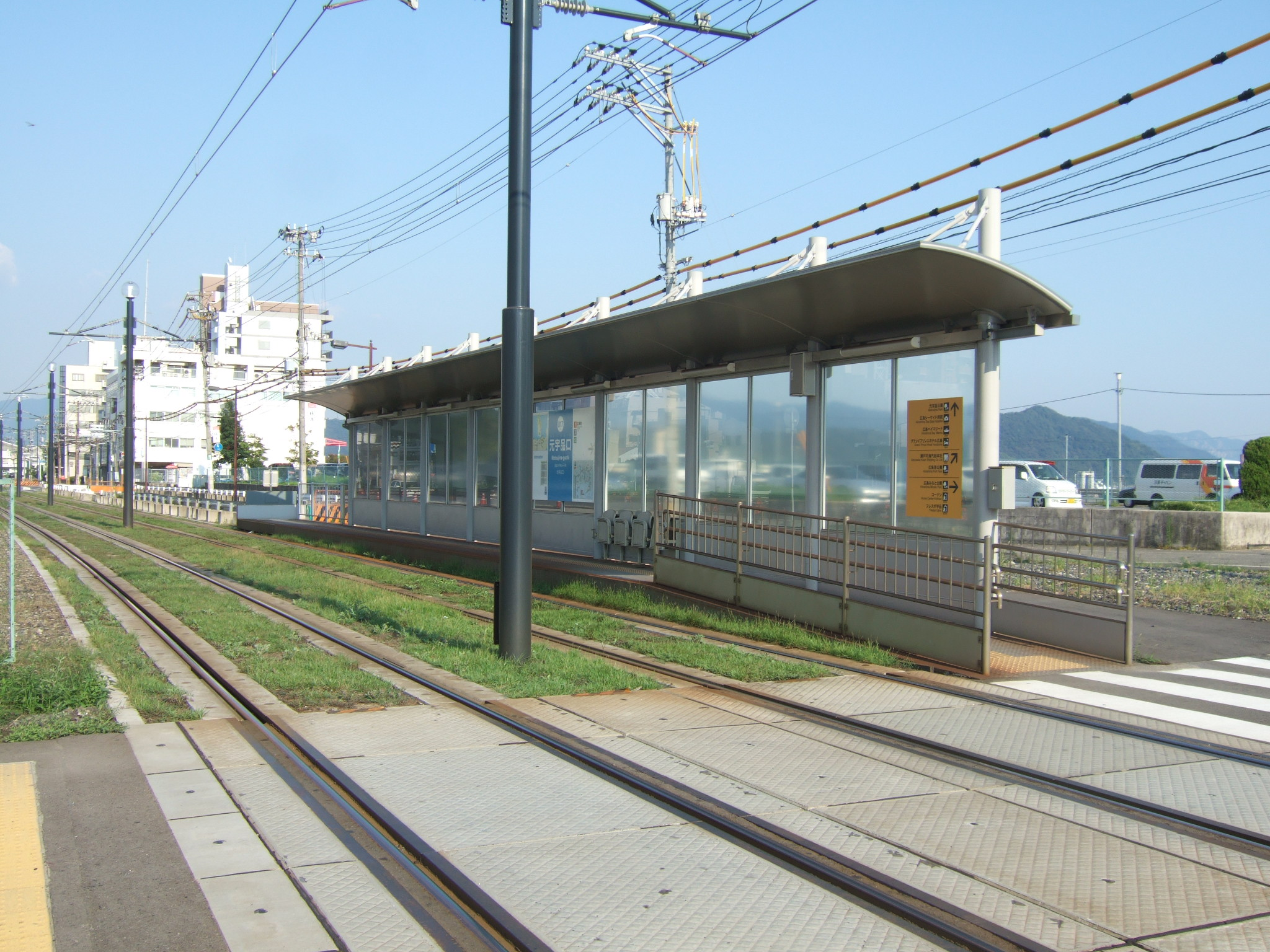

General information
- Location: Ujina-kaigan 1-chome, Minami-ku, Hiroshima; Japan
- Operator: Hiroshima Electric Railway
- Lines: █ Hiroden Ujina Line; Route

Other information
- Station code: U17

History
- Opened: April 3, 1915
Location

Motoujina-guchi is a Hiroden station (tram stop) on Hiroden Ujina Line, located in Minami-ku, Hiroshima.

== Routes ==
From Motoujina-guchi Station, there are three of Hiroden Streetcar routes.

- Hiroshima Station - Hiroshima Port Route
- Hiroden-nishi-hiroshima - Hiroshima Port Route
- Hiroshima Station - (via Hijiyama-shita) - Hiroshima Port Route

== Connections ==
█ Ujina Line

Kaigan-dori — Motoujina-guchi — Hiroshima Port

== Around station ==
- Moto-Ujina Park
- Hiroshima Minato Park

== History ==
- Opened as "Mukōujina-guchi" on April 3, 1915.
- Moved and renamed to "2-chome-ura" in 1929.
- Renamed to "Mukōujina" as the terminal stop on December 27, 1935.
- Renamed to "Mukōujina-guchi".
- Renamed to the present name "Motoujina-guchi" on November 1, 2001.

== See also ==
- Hiroden lines and routes
- List of railway stations in Japan
