= Hiroden-hatsukaichi Station =

Railway station in Hatsukaichi, Hiroshima prefecture, Japan

Coordinates: 34.3565°N 132.3359°E

Hiroden-hatsukaichi 広電廿日市
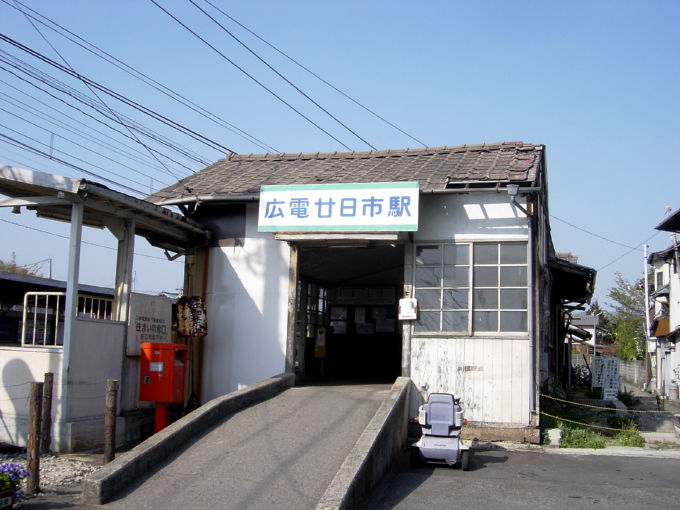

General information
- Location: 2-1-25, Hatsukaichi, Hatsukaichi, Hiroshima; Japan
- Operator: Hiroshima Electric Railway
- Lines: Hiroden █ Miyajima Line; Route
- Connections: █ Sanyo Main Line at Hatsukaichi Station

Other information
- Station code: M32

History
- Opened: April 6, 1924
Location

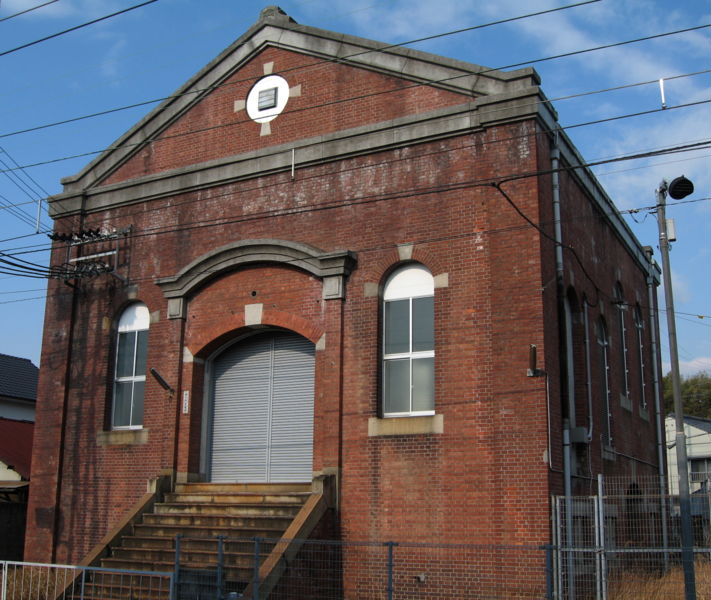
Hiroden Hatsukaichi Transformer Substation

Hiroden-hatsukaichi is a Hiroden station on Hiroden Miyajima Line, located in Hatsukaichi, Hatsukaichi, Hiroshima.

== Routes ==
From Hiroden-hatsukaichi Station, there is one of Hiroden Streetcar routes.

- Hiroshima Station - Hiroden-miyajima-guchi Route

== Connections ==
█ Miyajima Line

Sanyo-joshidai-mae — Hiroden-hatsukaichi — Hatsukaichi-shiyakusyo-mae (Hera)

== Other services connections ==
=== JR lines ===
- JR lines connections at JR Hatsukaichi Station

== Around station ==
- JR Hatsukaichi Station
- Hiroden Hatsukaichi Transformer Substation

== History ==
- Opened as "Hatsukaichi-cho" on April 6, 1924.
- Renamed to "Densya-hatsukaichi" on February 1, 1931.
- Renamed to "Hiroden-hatsukaichi" on June 1, 1961.
- Stopped the shuttle service during the morning rush hour since August 31, 1998.
- Closed the station office on December 30, 2005.

== See also ==
- Hiroden lines and routes
