= Miyajima Boat Race Jō Station =

Railway station in Hatsukaichi, Hiroshima prefecture, Japan

Coordinates: 34.314375°N 132.304916°E

Miyajima Boat Race Jō 宮島ボートレース場

General information
- Location: Hatsukaichi, Hiroshima; Japan
- Operator: Hiroshima Electric Railway
- Lines: Hiroden █ Miyajima Line; Route

History
- Former names: Kyōteijō-mae (until 2019)
Location

Miyajima Boat Race Jō Station (宮島ボートレース場駅, Miyajima Bōtorēsujō-eki) is a Hiroden temporary station on the Hiroden Miyajima Line, located in Hatsukaichi, Hiroshima. It is used only during the speedboat race at Miyajima Speedboat Racing Stadium.

== Routes ==
From the station, there is one Hiroden Streetcar route.

- Hiroshima Station - Hiroden-miyajima-guchi Route

== Connections ==
█ Miyajima Line

Hiroden-ajina — Kyōteijō-mae (temporary stop) — Hiroden-miyajima-guchi

== Around station ==
- Miyajima Speedboat Racing Stadium

== History ==
- Opened as Kyōteijō-mae in 1954.
- Renamed to Miyajima Boat Race Jō on April 1, 2019.

== See also ==
- Hiroden lines and routes
