= Fukushima-cho Station =

Tram stop in Hiroshima, Japan

Coordinates: 34.3950°N 132.4340°E

Fukushima-cho Station 福島町
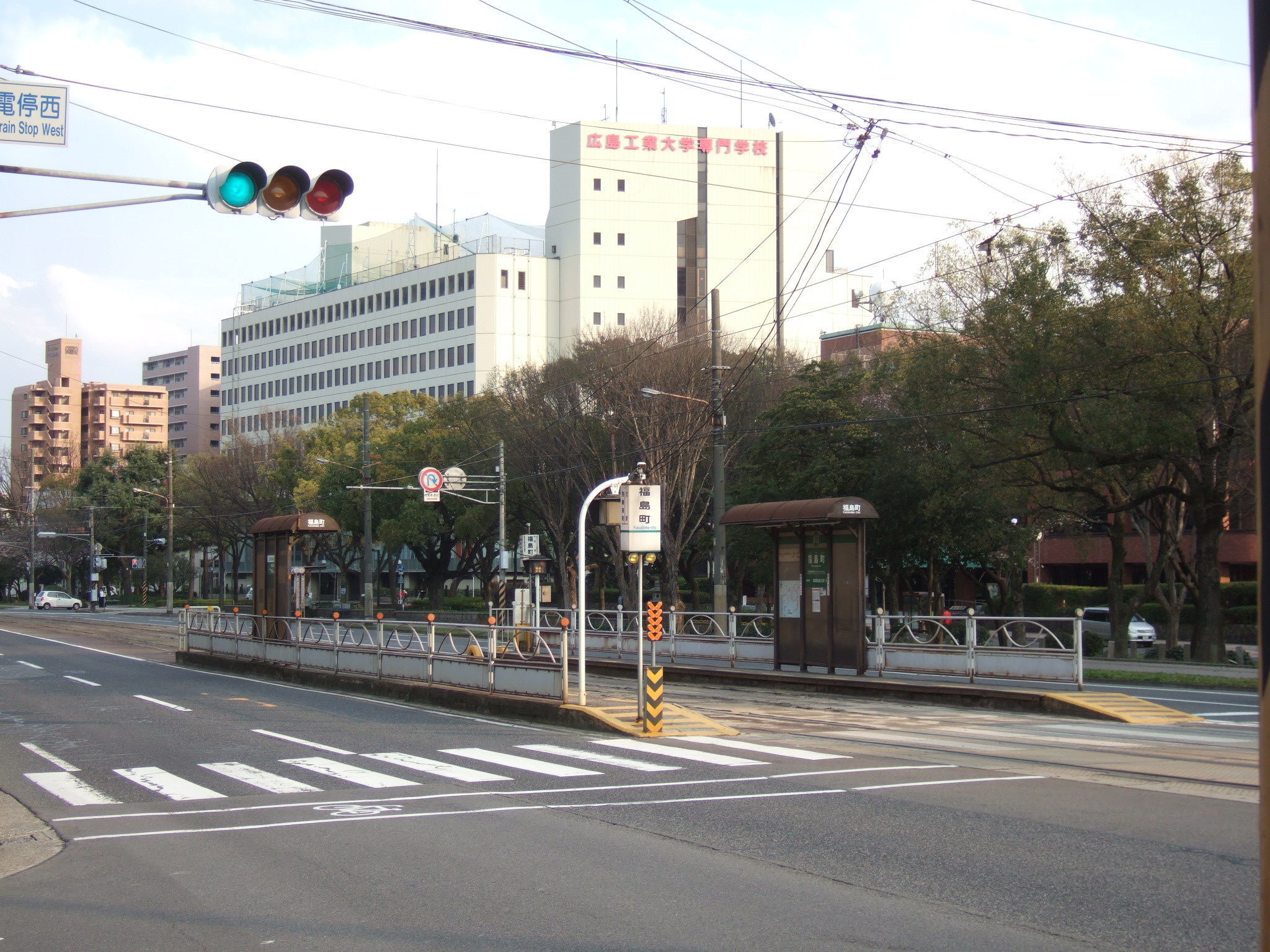
- Fukushima-cho Tramstop on Hiroshima Electric Railway

General information
- Location: Fukushima-cho 2-chome, Nishi-ku, Hiroshima; Japan
- Operator: Hiroshima Electric Railway
- Lines: █ Hiroden Main Line; Route

Other information
- Station code: M18

History
- Opened: December 8, 1912
Location

Fukushima-cho is a Hiroden station (tram stop) on Hiroden Main Line, located in front of Hiroshima Nishi Ward Office, Fukushima-cho 2-chome, Nishi-ku, Hiroshima.

== Routes ==
From Fukushima-cho Station, there are two of Hiroden Streetcar routes.

- Hiroshima Station - Hiroden-miyajima-guchi Route
- Hiroden-nishi-hiroshima - Hiroshima Port Route

== Connections ==
█ Main Line

Nishi-kanon-machi — Fukushima-cho — Hiroden-nishi-hiroshima

== Around station ==
- Peace Boulevard
- Hiroshima Nishi-ku Ward Office

== History ==
- Opened on December 8, 1912.
- Moved to the present place in September, 1964.

== See also ==
- Hiroden lines and routes
