= Takasu Station (Hiroshima) =

Train station in Hiroshima, Japan

Coordinates: 34°23′23″N 132°25′01″E

Takasu 高須
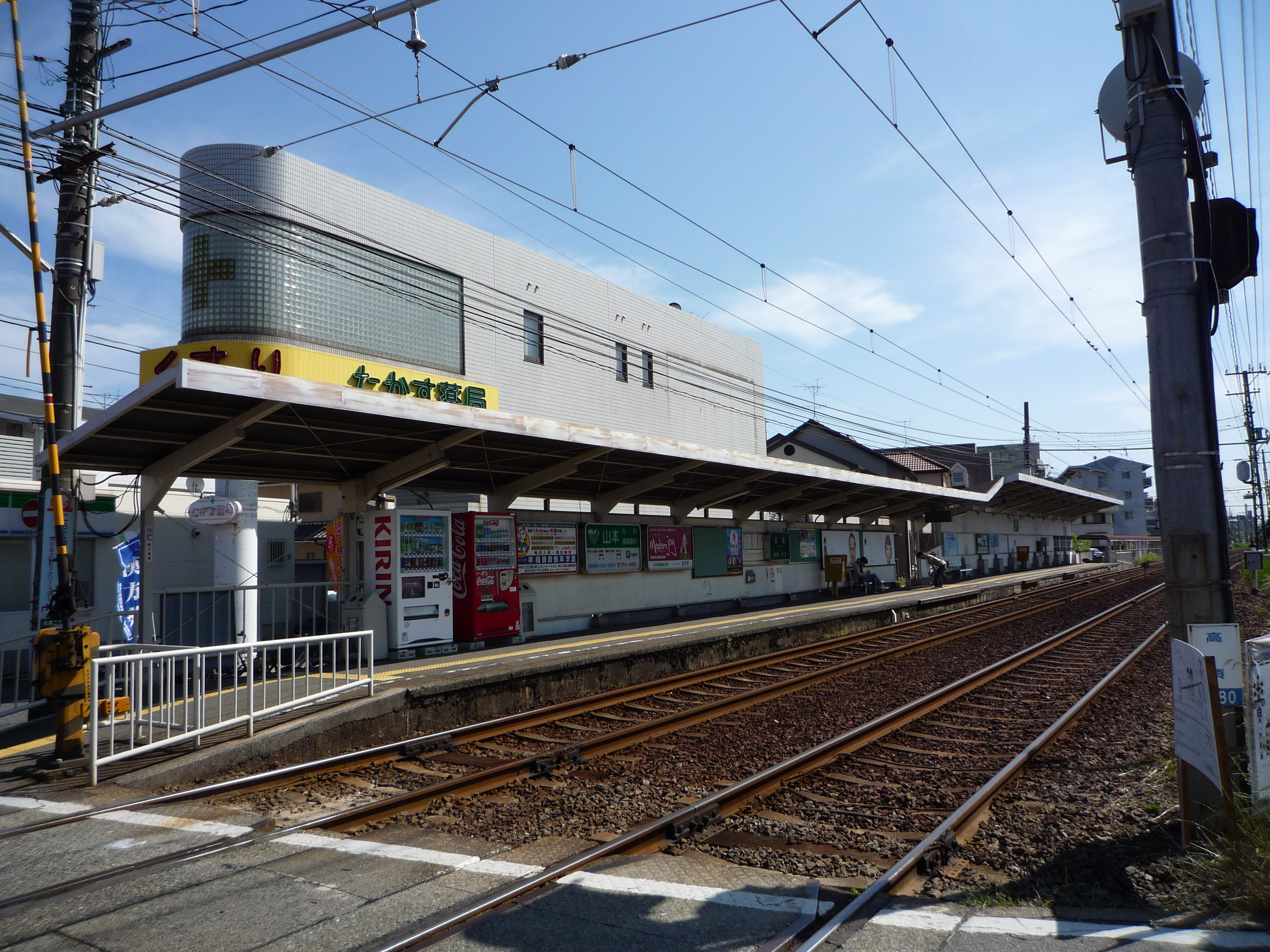
- Takasu Station (Hiroshima)

General information
- Location: 1-450-10, Takasu, Nishi-ku, Hiroshima; Japan
- Operator: Hiroshima Electric Railway
- Lines: Hiroden █ Miyajima Line; Route

Other information
- Station code: M21

History
- Opened: August 22, 1922
Location

Takasu is a Hiroden station on Hiroden Miyajima Line, located in Takasu, Nishi-ku, Hiroshima.

== Routes ==
From Takasu Station, there is one of Hiroden Streetcar routes.

- Hiroshima Station - Hiroden-miyajima-guchi Route

== Connections ==
█ Miyajima Line

Higashi-takasu — Takasu — Furue

== History ==
- Opened on August 22, 1922.

== See also ==
- Hiroden lines and routes
