= Kaigan-dori Station =

Tram stop in Hiroshima, Japan

Coordinates: 34°21′19″N 132°27′47″E

Kaigan-dori 海岸通
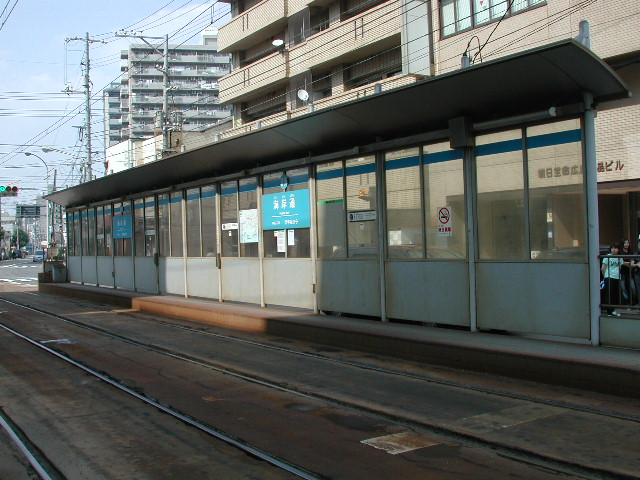

General information
- Location: Ujina-kaigan 2-chome & Ujina-kaigan 3-chome, Minami-ku, Hiroshima; Japan
- Operator: Hiroshima Electric Railway
- Lines: █ Hiroden Ujina Line; Route

Other information
- Station code: U16

History
- Opened: April 3, 1915
Location

Kaigan-dori is a Hiroden station (tram stop) on Hiroden Ujina Line, located in Minami-ku, Hiroshima.

== Routes ==
From Kaigan-dori Station, there are three Hiroden streetcar routes.

- Hiroshima Station – Hiroshima Port Route
- Hiroden-nishi-hiroshima – Hiroshima Port Route
- Hiroshima Station – (via Hijiyama-shita) – Hiroshima Port Route

== Connections ==
█ Ujina Line

Ujina 5-chōme – Kaigan-dori – Motoujina-guchi

== Around station ==
- Hiroshima Keirin-jo
- Ujina gymnasium
- 6th Regional Coast Guard Headquarters
- The Hiroshima Shinkin Bank Ujina
- DIO Ujina

== History ==
- Opened as "Ujina" terminal on April 3, 1915.
- Changed the route and opened as "Ujina-sanbashi-mae" on December 27, 1935.
- Closed from June 1942 to November 30, 1950.
- Reopened as "Kaigan-dori" on December 1, 1950.
- Rebuilt "Kangan-dori" on August 31, 2002

== See also ==
- Hiroden lines and routes
- List of railway stations in Japan
