= Higashi-takasu Station =

Railway station in Hiroshima, Japan

Coordinates: 34.3918°N 132.4203°E

Higashi-takasu Station 東高須
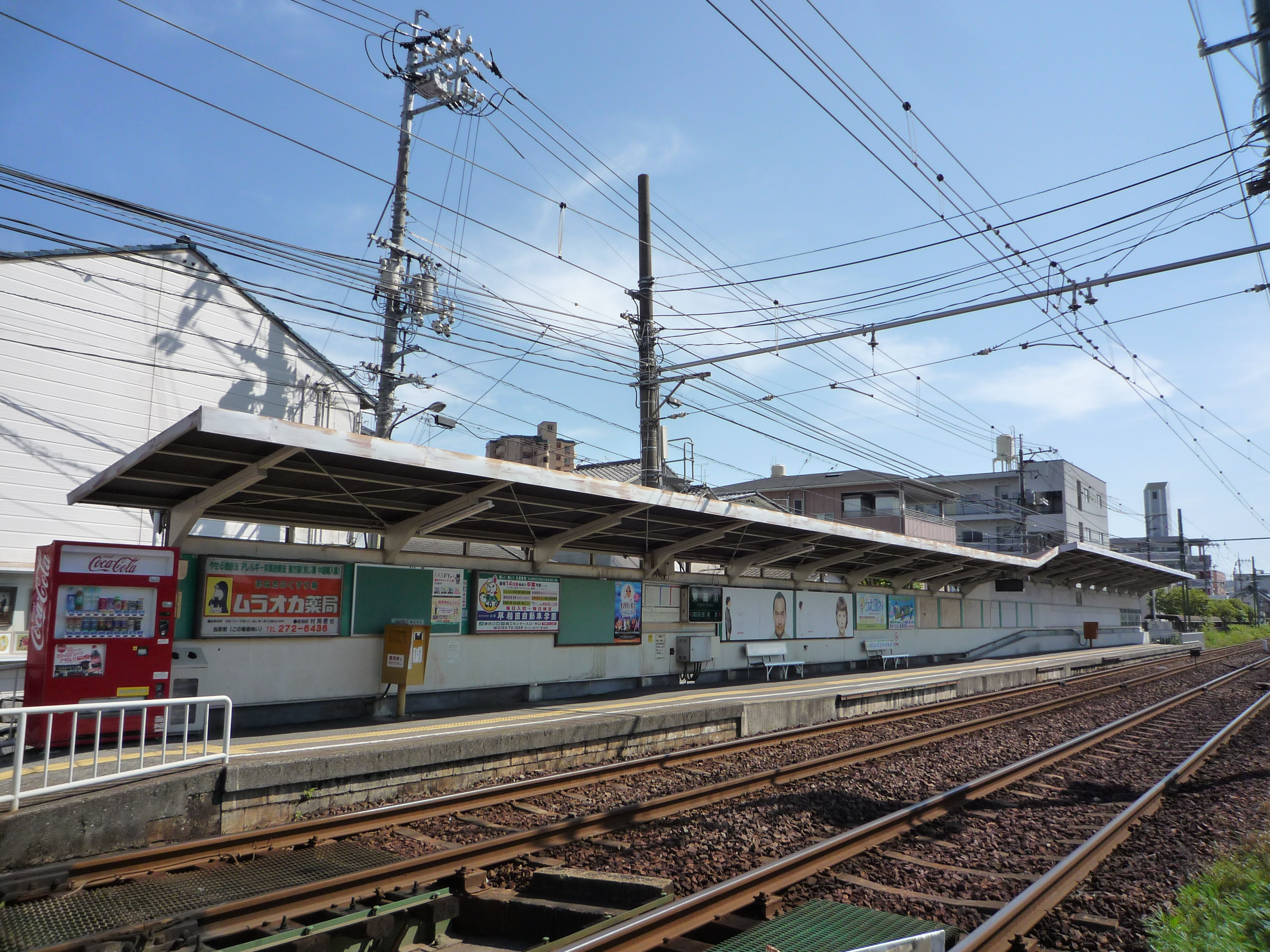

General information
- Location: 1-534-4, Takasu, Nishi-ku, Hiroshima; Japan
- Operator: Hiroshima Electric Railway
- Lines: Hiroden █ Miyajima Line; Route

Other information
- Station code: M20

History
- Opened: December 1, 1964
Location

Higashi-takasu is a Hiroden station on Hiroden Miyajima Line, located in Takasu, Nishi-ku, Hiroshima.

== Routes ==
From Higashi-takasu Station, there is one of Hiroden Streetcar routes.

- Hiroshima Station - Hiroden-miyajima-guchi Route

== Connections ==
█ Miyajima Line

Hiroden-nishi-hiroshima — Higashi-takasu — Takasu

== Around station ==
- Nishi-Hiroshima Bypass

== History ==
- Opened on December 1, 1964.

== See also ==
- Hiroden lines and routes
