= Sanyo-jogakuen-mae Station =

Railway station in Hatsukaichi, Hiroshima prefecture, Japan

Coordinates: 34.3620°N 132.3411°E

Sanyo-jogakuen-mae 山陽女学園前
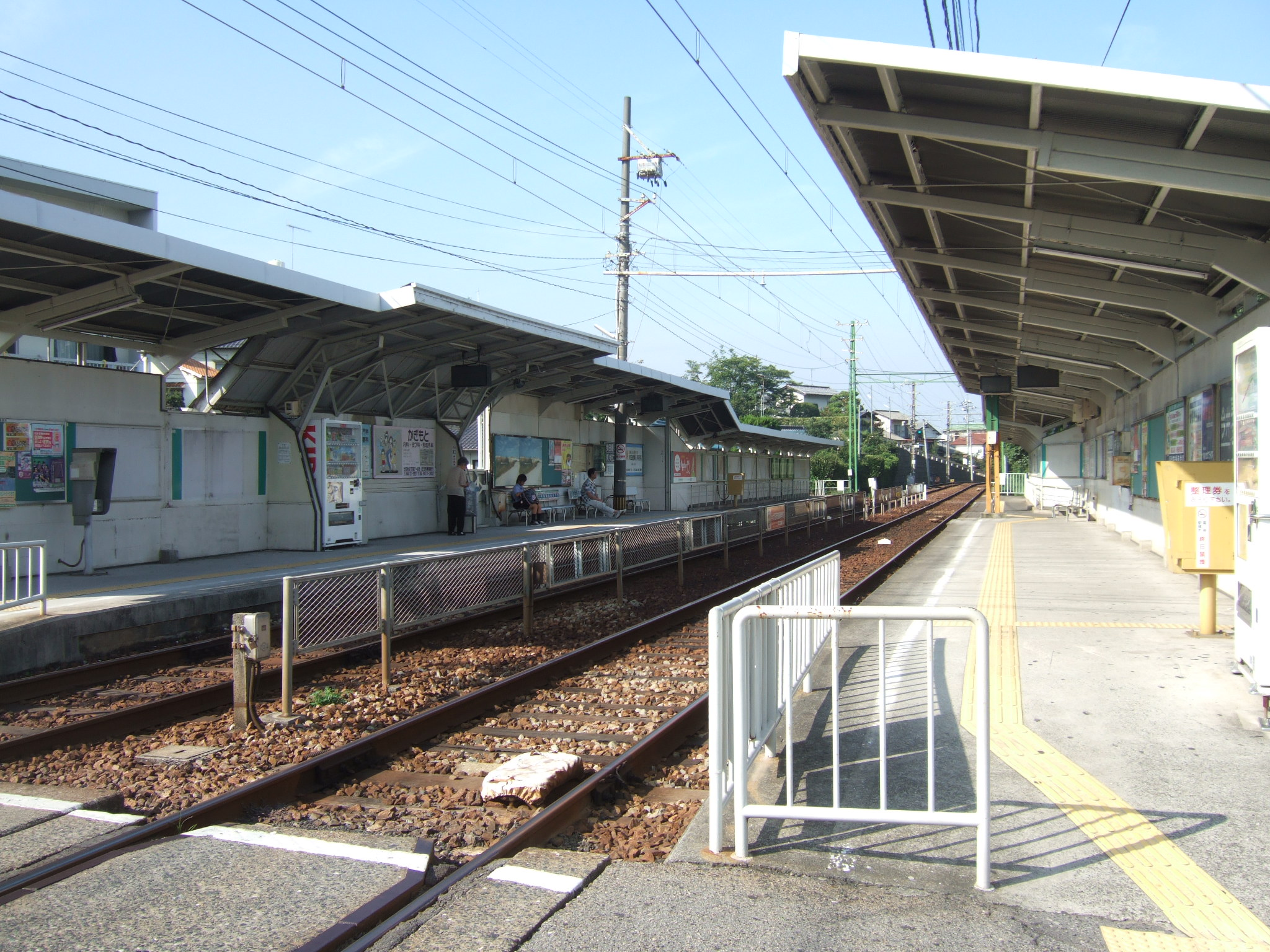

General information
- Location: Sagatahonmachi, Hatsukaichi, Hiroshima; Japan
- Operator: Hiroshima Electric Railway
- Lines: Hiroden █ Miyajima Line; Route

Other information
- Station code: M31

History
- Opened: December 24, 1950
- Former names: Sanyo-joshidai-mae (until 2019)
Location

Sanyo-jogakuen-mae Station (山陽女学園前駅, San'yō Jogakuen mae eki) is a station on the Hiroden Miyajima Line, located in Sagatahonmachi, Hatsukaichi, Hiroshima.

== Routes ==
From Sanyo-jogakuen-mae Station, there is one of Hiroden Streetcar routes.

- Hiroshima Station - Hiroden-miyajima-guchi Route

== Connections ==
█ Miyajima Line

Rakurakuen — Sanyo-jogakuen-mae — Hiroden-hatsukaichi

== Around station ==
- Sanyo Women's College
- Sanyo girls' junior / senior high school

== History ==
Sanyo-jogakuen-mae Station, originally named "Sanyo-jogakuen," began operations on December 24, 1950, serving the Hiroden Miyajima Line in Hatsukaichi, Hiroshima. On April 1, 1963, the station was renamed "Sanyo-joshidai-mae". Several decades later, on April 1, 2019, it adopted its current name, "Sanyo-jogakuen-mae."

== See also ==
- Hiroden lines and routes
