= Itsukaichi Station =

Railway station in Hatsukaichi, Hiroshima Prefecture, Japan

Itsukaichi Station 五日市駅
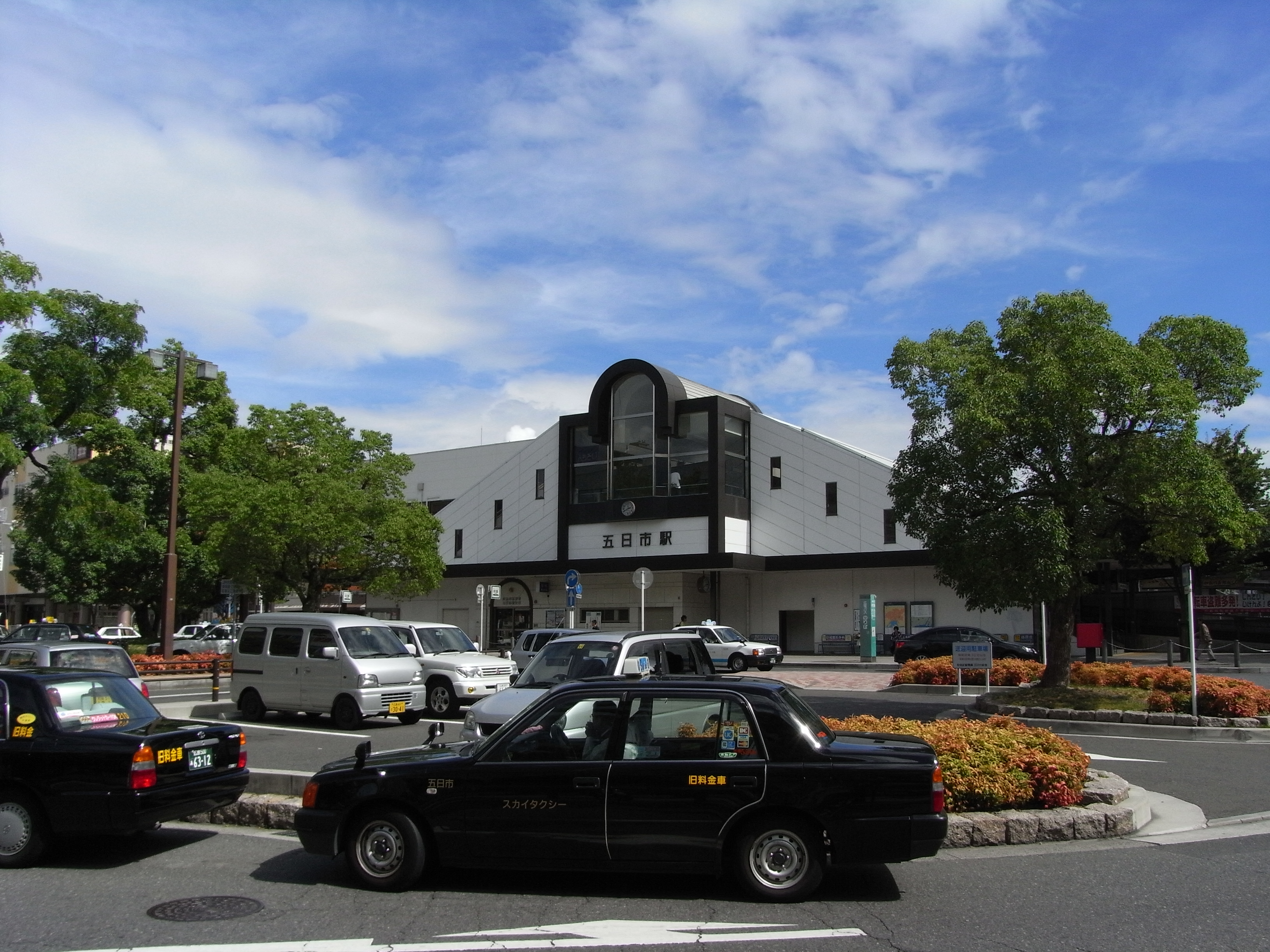
- Itsukaichi Station north exit, August 2008

General information
- Location: 1 Asahien, Saeki-ku, Hiroshima-shi, Hiroshima-ken 731-5133; Japan
- Coordinates: 34°22′0.9″N 132°22′5.29″E
- Owner: West Japan Railway Company
- Operator: West Japan Railway Company
- Line: R Sanyō Main Line
- Distance: 316.8 km (196.9 miles) from Kobe
- Platforms: 1 side + 1 island platform
- Tracks: 3
- Connections: Bus stop

Construction
- Accessible: Yes

Other information
- Status: Staffed
- Station code: JR-R06
- Website: Official website

History
- Opened: 8 December 1899; 126 years ago

Passengers
- FY2019: 13,404

Services
Preceding station	JR West	Following station
Miyajimaguchi towards Iwakuni	San'yō Line City Liner	Yokogawa towards Hiroshima
Miyauchi-Kushido towards Iwakuni	San'yō Line Rapid	Shin-Inokuchi towards Hiroshima
Hatsukaichi towards Iwakuni	San'yō Line Local	Shin-Inokuchi towards Hiroshima
Location
- Location within Hiroshima Prefecture Location within Japan

Itsukaichi Station (五日市駅, Itsukaichi-eki) is a passenger railway station located in Saeki-ku in the city of Hiroshima, Hiroshima Prefecture, Japan. It is operated by the West Japan Railway Company (JR West). The station connects to Hiroden-itsukaichi Station on the Hiroden Lines.

== Lines ==
Itsukaichi Station is served by the JR West Sanyō Main Line, and is located 316.8 kilometers from the terminus of the line at Kobe.

== Station layout ==
The station consists of one ground-level side platform and one island platform connected by an elevated station building. The station is staffed.

== Platforms ==
1	■ R Sanyō Main Line	for Hiroshima
2, 3	■ R Sanyō Main Line	for Miyajimaguchi and Iwakuni

== History ==
Itsukaichi Station was opened on 08 December 1899. With the privatization of the Japan National Railway (JNR) on 1 April 1987, the station came under the aegis of the West Japan railway Company (JR West).

== Passenger statistics ==
In fiscal 2019, the station was used by an average of 13,404 passengers daily.

== Surrounding area ==
- Hiroshima Nagisa Junior and Senior High School

== See also ==
- List of railway stations in Japan
