= Hiroshima Shudo University =

Private university in Hiroshima, Japan

Coordinates: 34°26′00″N 132°24′18″E

- Hiroshima shūdō daigaku
- Established: 1725; 300 years ago
- Location: Hiroshima, Hiroshima

Hiroshima Shudo University (広島修道大学, Hiroshima shūdō daigaku) is a private university in Hiroshima, Hiroshima, Japan.

The predecessor of the school, Hiroshima Domain's Han school, was founded in 1725. It was chartered as a junior college in 1952 and became a four-year college in 1960. The school adopted the present name in 1973. It was announced in March 2013 that Shudo Gakuen, the educational corporation behind the university, would merge in April 2015 with Suzugamine Gakuen, the educational corporation behind Suzugamine Women's College.
