= Hiroden-itsukaichi Station =

Railway station in Hiroshima, Japan

Coordinates: 34.3661°N 132.3680°E

Hiroden-itsukaichi 広電五日市
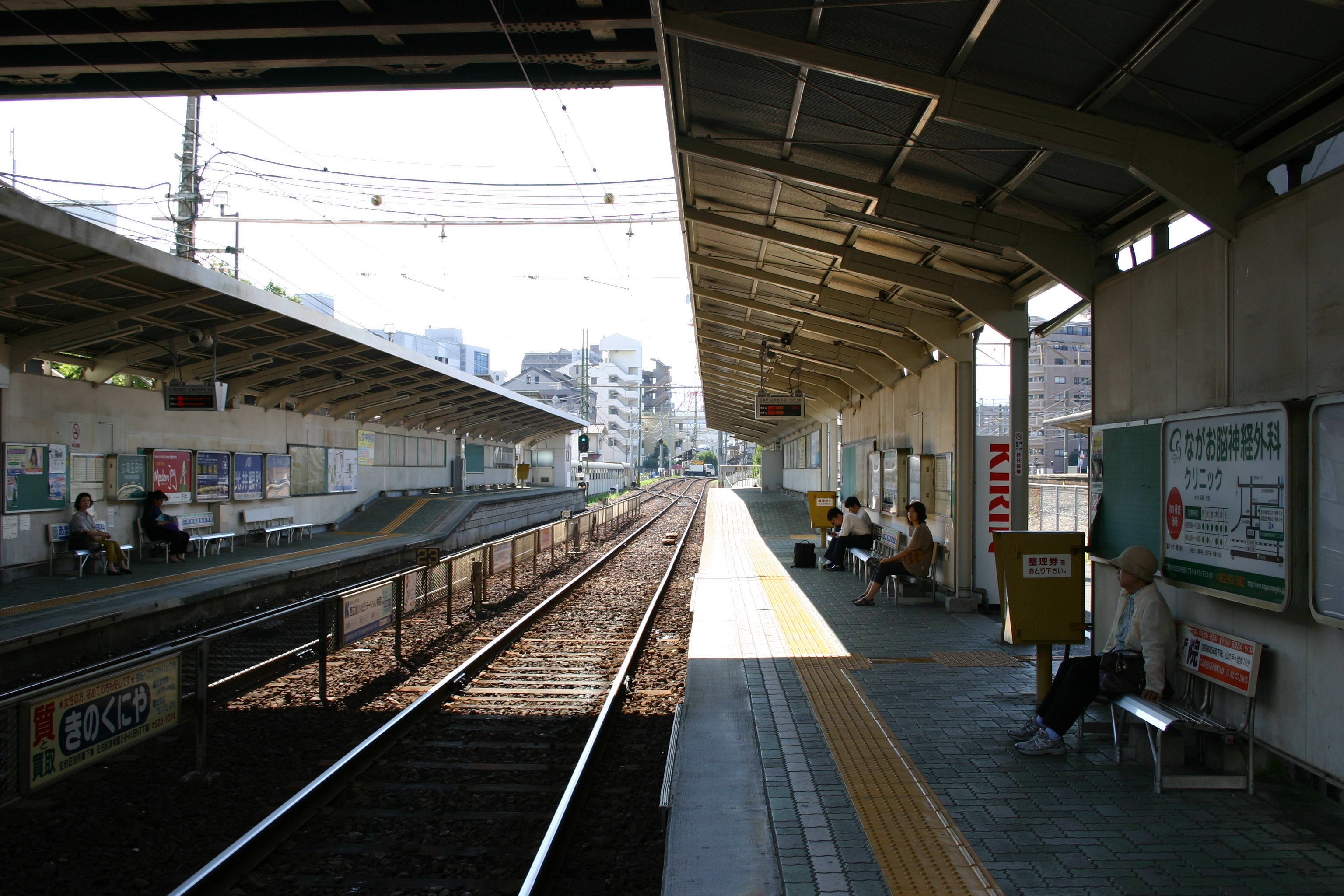
- HiroDen Itukaiti in 2013

General information
- Location: 2-720-9, Asahien, Saeki-ku, Hiroshima; Japan
- Operator: Hiroshima Electric Railway
- Lines: Hiroden █ Miyajima Line; Route
- Connections: █ Sanyo Main Line at Itsukaichi Station

Other information
- Station code: M28

History
- Opened: April 6, 1924
Location

Hiroden-itsukaichi is a Hiroden station on Hiroden Miyajima Line, located south of the JR Itsukaichi Station in Asahien, Saeki-ku, Hiroshima.

== Routes ==
From Hiroden-itsukaichi Station, there is one of Hiroden Streetcar routes.

- Hiroshima Station - Hiroden-miyajima-guchi Route

== Connections ==
█ Miyajima Line

Shudaifuzoku-suzugamine-mae — Hiroden-itsukaichi — Saeki-kuyakusyo-mae (Saeki Ward Office)

== Other services connections ==
=== JR lines ===
- JR lines connections at JR Itsukaichi Station

Hiroden-itsukaichi Station is directly connected to the JR Itsukaichi Station by an overpass.

=== Bus services routes ===
- Bus services routes connections at Itsukaichi Station

== History ==
- Opened as "Itsukaichi-cho" on April 6, 1924.
- Renamed to "Dentei-Itsukaichi" on February 1, 1931.
- Renamed to "Hiroden-itsukaichi" on June 1, 1961.
- Moved to present place to connect to JR Itsukaichi Station on March 27, 1987

== See also ==
- Hiroden lines and routes
