= Sanyo Girls' Junior/Senior High School =

School in Hiroshima, Japan

Coordinates: 34°21′42.1″N 132°20′33.7″E

- Japanese: 山陽女学園中等部・高等部

Information
- School type: Secondary school
- Established: 1929; 97 years ago
- Gender: Girls
- Website: sanyo-jogakuen.ed.jp

Sanyo Girls' Junior/Senior High School (山陽女学園中等部・高等部, San'yō Jogakuen Chūtōbu Kōtōbu) is a female-only secondary school in Hatsukaichi, Hiroshima, Japan. It was founded in 1929.

The school has a marching band and color guard, majorette club, and a non-marching band. More school activities include kendo, volleyball, softball, soccer.gymnastics.
