= Hiroden-miyajima-guchi Station =

Railway station in Hatsukaichi, Hiroshima prefecture, Japan

Coordinates: 34.3122°N 132.3043°E

Hiroden-miyajima-guchi 広電宮島口
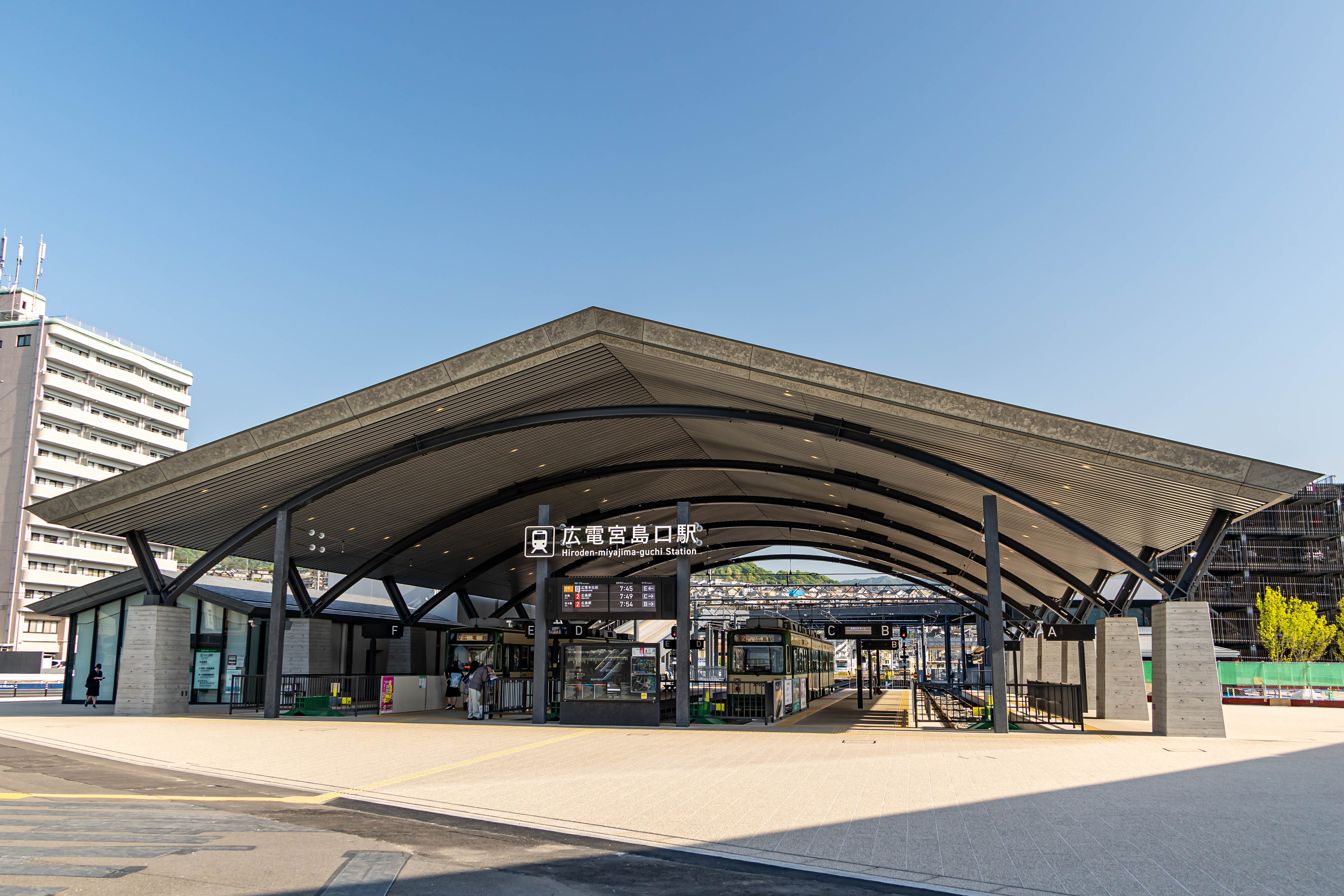

General information
- Location: 1-12-32, Miyajima-guchi, Hatsukaichi, Hiroshima; Japan
- Operator: Hiroshima Electric Railway
- Lines: Hiroden █ Miyajima Line; Route
- Connections: █ Sanyo Main Line at Miyajimaguchi Station

Other information
- Station code: M39

History
- Opened: February 1, 1931
Location

Hiroden-miyajima-guchi Station (広電宮島口駅, Hiroden Miyajimaguchi-eki) is a terminal station on the Hiroden Miyajima Line located in Miyajima-guchi, Hatsukaichi, Hiroshima, Japan.

== Routes ==
From Hiroden-miyajima-guchi Station, there is one of Hiroden Tram route on Hiroden Miyajima Line.

- Hiroshima Station - Hiroden-miyajima-guchi Route

== Connections ==
█ Miyajima Line

Hiroden-ajina － Hiroden-miyajima-guchi
Hiroden-ajina － (Kyoteijo-mae) － Hiroden-miyajima-guchi

== Other services connections ==
=== JR lines ===
- JR lines connections at JR Miyajimaguchi Station

=== Ferry service routes ===
There are ferry services for Miyajima.

- █ JR Miyajima Ferry
- █ Miyajima Matsudai Liner

== History ==
- Opened as "Densha Miyajima" on February 1, 1931.
- Renamed to "Hiroden-miyajima" on June 1, 1961.
- Renamed to "Hiroden-miyajima-guchi" on November 1, 2001.

== See also ==
- Hiroden lines and routes
