= Inokuchi Station (Hiroshima) =

Railway station in Hiroshima, Japan

Coordinates: 34°22′19″N 132°23′10″E

Inokuchi 井口
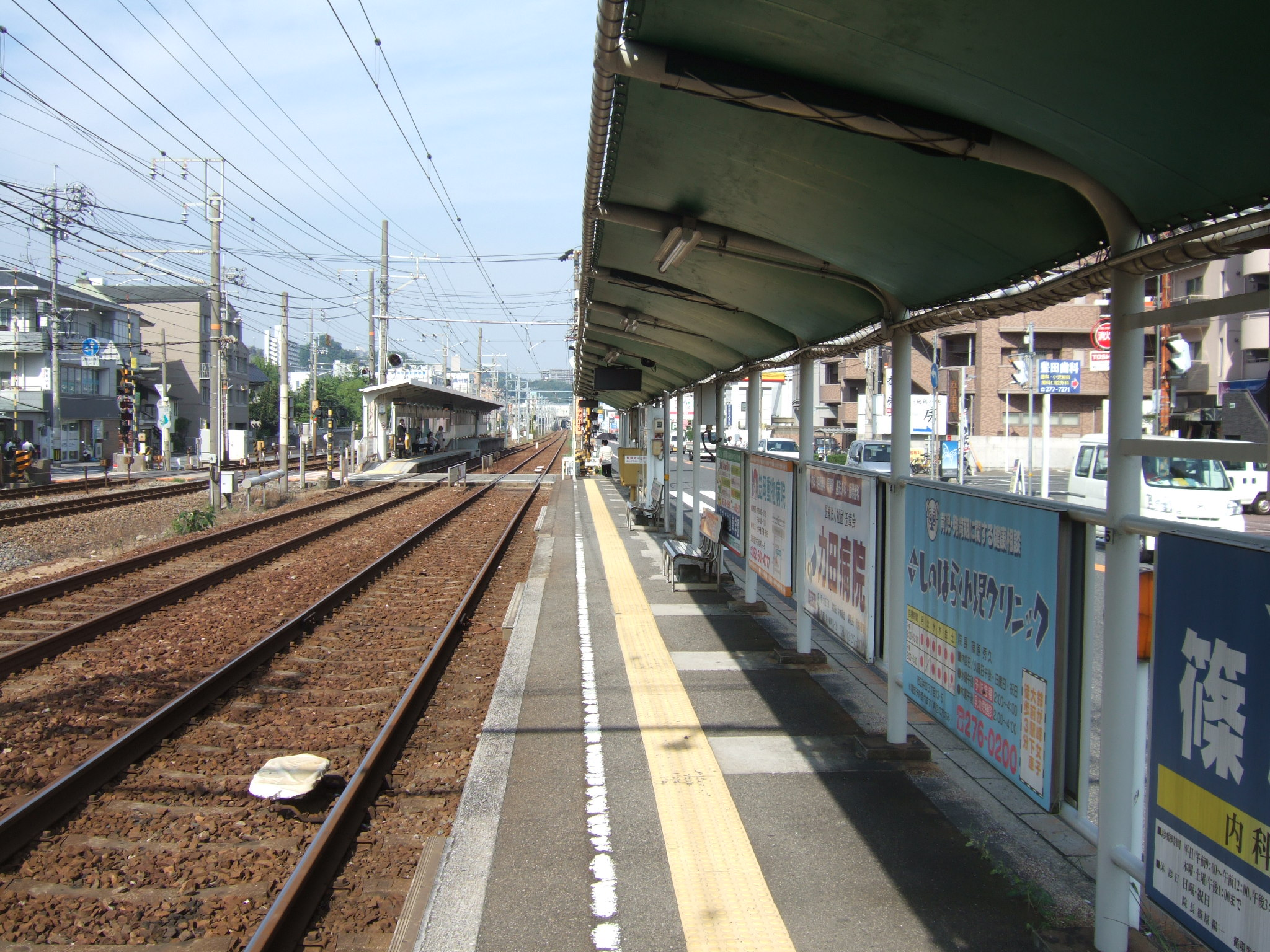

General information
- Location: 2-799-14, Inokuchi, Nishi-ku, Hiroshima; Japan
- Operator: Hiroshima Electric Railway
- Lines: Hiroden █ Miyajima Line; Route

Other information
- Station code: M26

History
- Opened: April 6, 1924
Location

Inokuchi is a Hiroden station on Hiroden Miyajima Line, located in Inokuchi, Nishi-ku, Hiroshima.

== Routes ==
From Inokuchi Station, there is one of Hiroden Streetcar routes.

- Hiroshima Station - Hiroden-miyajima-guchi Route

== Connections ==
█ Miyajima Line

Shoko Center-iriguchi — Inokuchi — Shudaifuzoku-suzugamine-mae

== Around station ==
- Hiroshima Inokuchi Senior High School
- Hiroshima Municipal Inokuchi Junior High School
- Hiroshima Municipal Inokuchi Elementary High School
- Hiroshima Municipal Inokuchi-Myoujin Elementary School

== History ==
- Opened on April 6, 1924.

== See also ==
- Hiroden lines and routes
