= Suzugamine Women's College =

Japanese women's college

Coordinates: 34°22′15″N 132°22′23″E

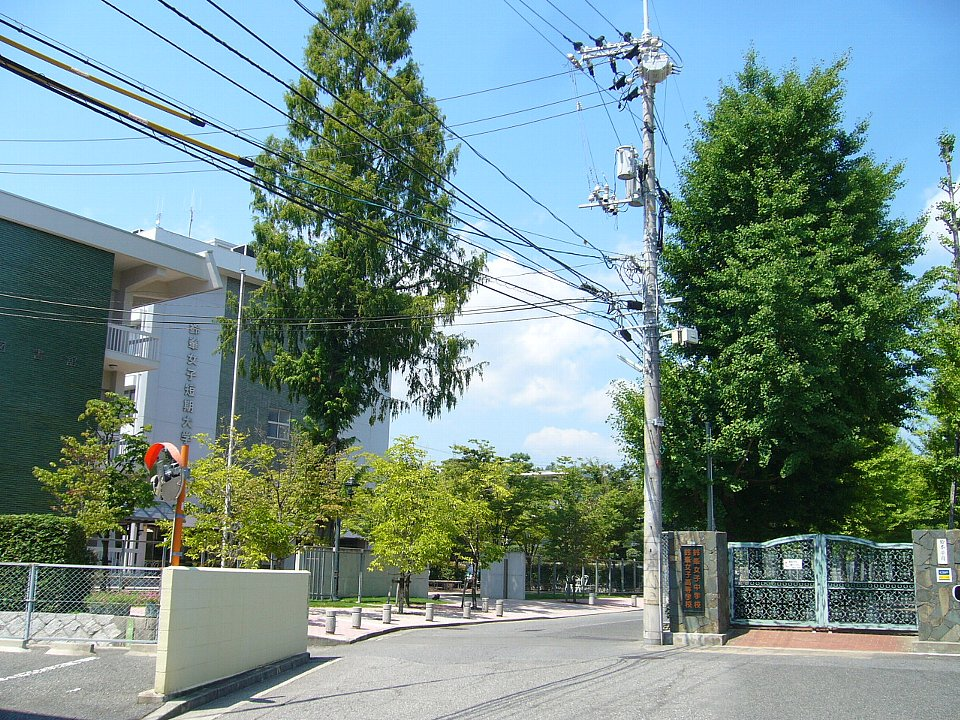
Suzugamine Women's College

Suzugamine Women's College (鈴峯女子短期大学, Suzugamine joshi tanki daigaku) was a private junior women's college in Hiroshima, Hiroshima Prefecture, Japan, established in 1950.

== Merger ==
On March 28, 2013, Suzugamine Gakuen (the corporation that runs Suzugamine Women's College) and Shudo Gakuen (which runs Hiroshima Shudo University) announced that they would merge due to the increased competition for new students (resulting from Japan's declining birth rate). They joined forces to provide improved education services to better benefit the region, while maintaining their individual traditions and strengths. The merger was to be completed on April 1, 2015.

The college's traditions and education were passed to Hiroshima Shudo University. Issuance of certificates will be held at the Hiroshima Shudo University Faculty Center.

Suzumi Women's Junior College closed after 67.5 years at the end of March 2017.
