= Hatsukaichi-shiyakusho-mae Station =

Railway station in Hatsukaichi, Hiroshima prefecture, Japan

Coordinates: 34°21′11″N 132°19′47″E

Hatsukaichi-shiyakusyo-mae Station(Hera) 廿日市市役所前（平良）
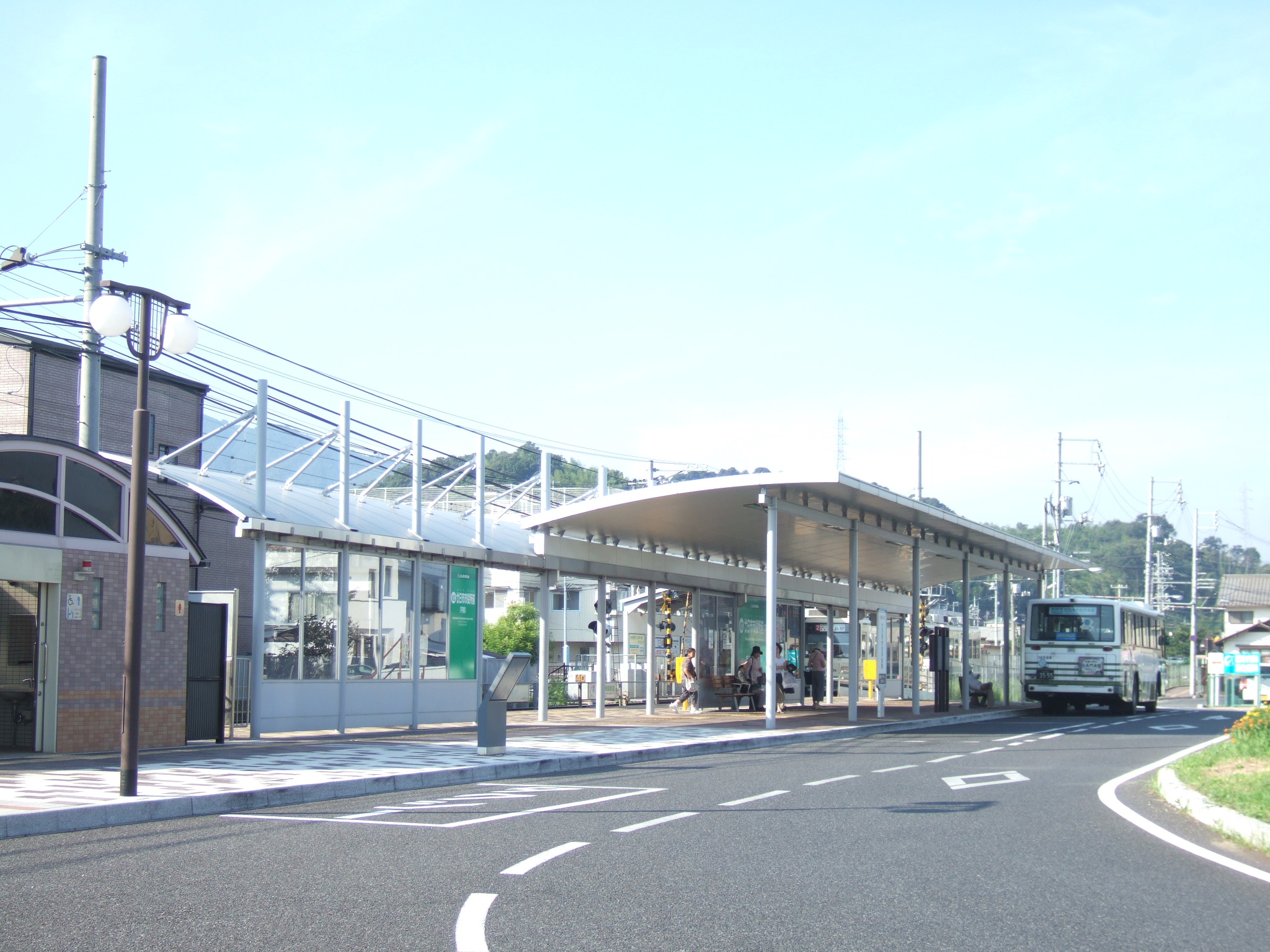

General information
- Location: 1-145-3, Shingu, Hatsukaichi, Hiroshima; Japan
- Operator: Hiroshima Electric Railway
- Lines: Hiroden █ Miyajima Line; Route

Other information
- Station code: M33

History
- Opened: November 1, 1984
Location

Hatsukaichi-shiyakusyo-mae (Hera) is a Hiroden station on Hiroden Miyajima Line, located in front of Hatsukaichi City Hall, in Shingu, Hatsukaichi, Hiroshima.

== Routes ==
From Hatsukaichi-shiyakusyo-mae (Hera) Station, there is one of Hiroden Streetcar routes.

- Hiroshima Station - Hiroden-miyajima-guchi Route

== Connections ==
█ Miyajima Line

Hiroden-hatsukaichi — Hatsukaichi-shiyakusyo-mae (Hera) — Miyauchi

== Around station ==
- Hatsukaichi City Hall
- Hatsukaichi City Sports Center
- Hatsukaichi Post Office
- Hatsukaichi Cultural Hall "SAKURAPIA"

== History ==
- Opened as "Hera" on November 1, 1984.
- Moved on January 28, 2006.
- Rebuilt and renamed to "Hatsukaichi-shiyakusyo-mae (Hera)" on June 1, 2006.
- Started Sakura-Bus services on June 2, 2006.

== See also ==
- Hiroden lines and routes
