= Hiroshima Port Station =

Tram stop in Hiroshima, Japan

Coordinates: 34°21′10″N 132°27′19″E

Hiroshima Port 広島港（宇品）
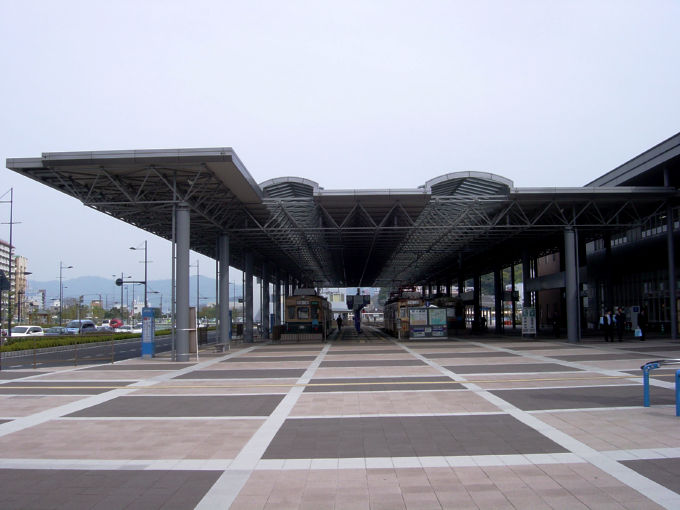

General information
- Location: Ujinakaigan 1-chome, Minami-ku, Hiroshima; Japan
- Operator: Hiroshima Electric Railway
- Lines: █ Hiroden Ujina Line; Route
- Platforms: 3 bay platforms

Other information
- Station code: U18

History
- Opened: April 1, 1951
Location

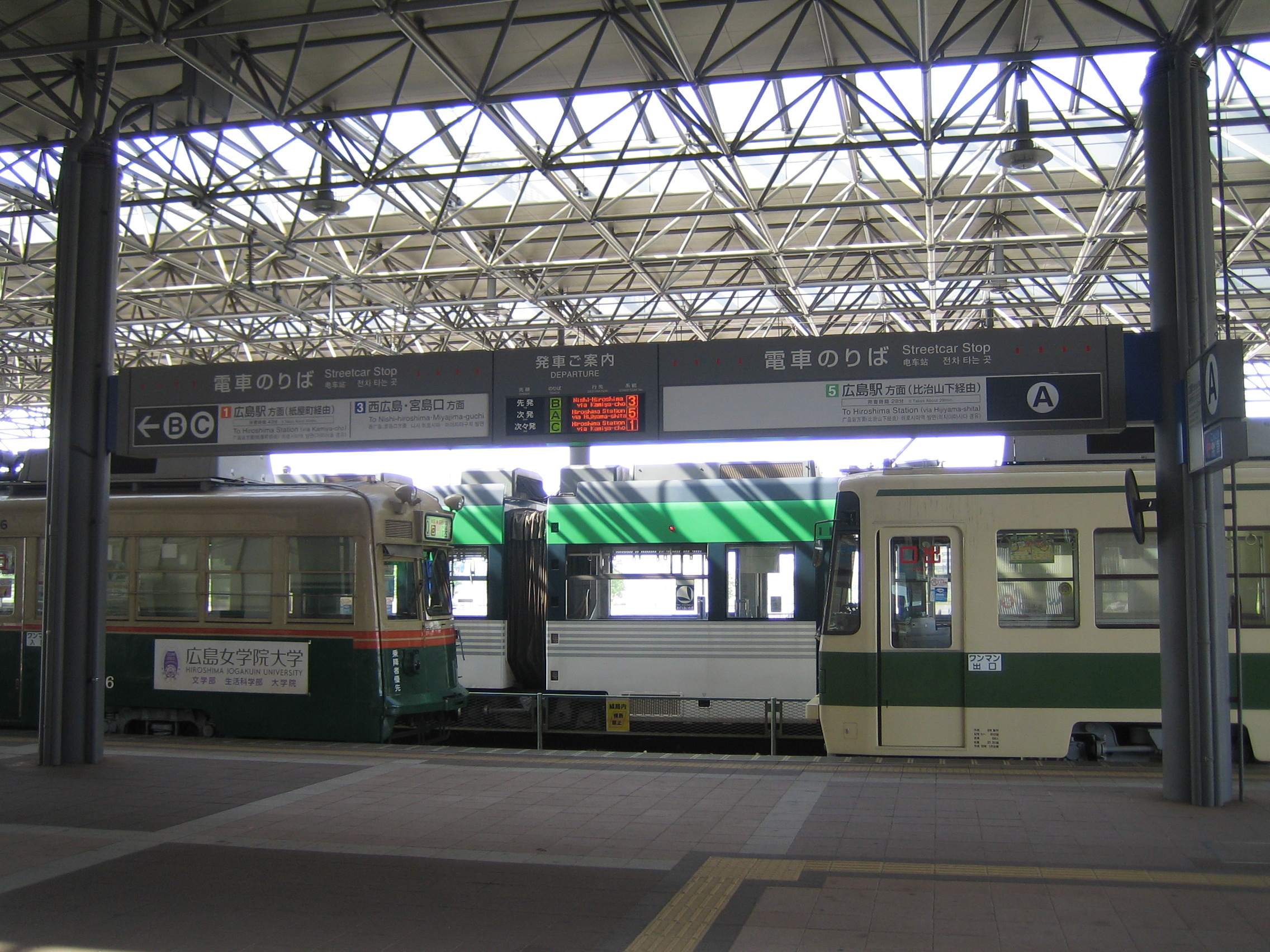
A view from the station entrance

Hiroshima Port Station is a Hiroden terminal station on Hiroden Ujina Line, located in Ujinakaigan 1-chome, Minami-ku, Hiroshima.

== Routes ==
From Hiroshima Port Station, there are three of Hiroden Streetcar routes.

- Hiroshima Station - Hiroshima Port Route
- Hiroden-nishi-hiroshima - Hiroshima Port Route
- Hiroshima Station - (via Hijiyama-shita) - Hiroshima Port Route

== Platforms ==
- A for
- B and C for and

== Connections ==
█ Ujina Line

Motoujina-guchi — Hiroshima Port

== Other services connections ==
- Ferries and hydrofoils for Matsuyama, Imabari, Kure, Miyajima, Etajima and some other islands in Seto Inland Sea.

== Around station ==
- Hiroshima Port
- Hiroshima Minato Park

== History ==
- Opened as "Ujina" tram stop on April 1, 1951.
- Rebuilt on October 1, 1967.
- Renamed to "Hiroshima Port" on November 1, 2001.
- Moved and Rebuilt on March 29, 2003 at the present place.

== See also ==
- Hiroden lines and routes
- List of railway stations in Japan
