= Saeki-ku =

Ward of Hiroshima, Japan

Saeki-ku 佐伯区
- Ward
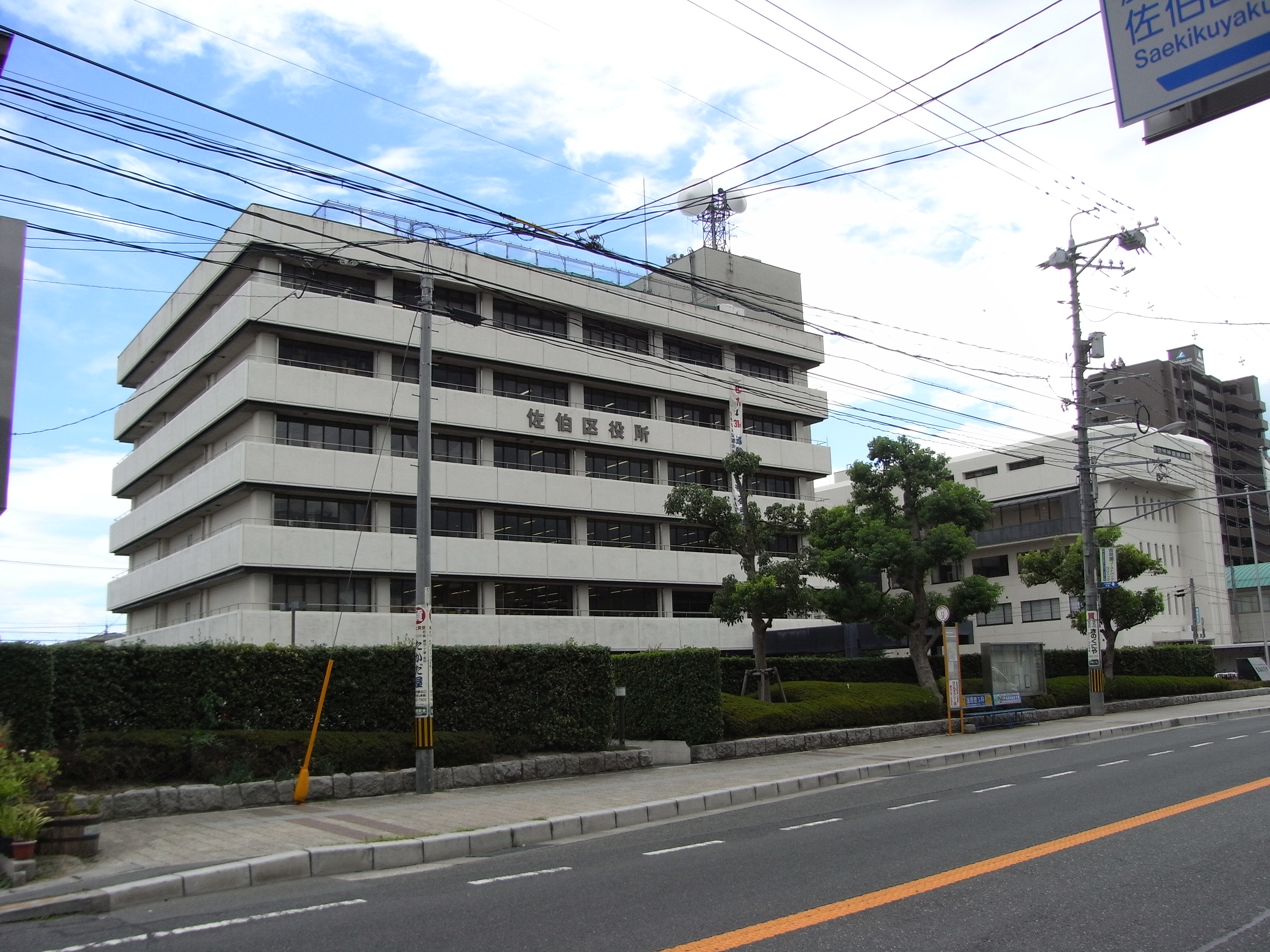
- Saeki Ward Office

- Flag Seal

- Location of Saeki-ku in Hiroshima City

- Location within Japan
- Coordinates: 34°21′52″N 132°21′39″E
- Country: Japan
- Region: Chūgoku (Sanyo)
- Prefecture: Hiroshima
- City: Hiroshima
- Established: April 1, 1980

Area
  - Total: 225.43 km^{2} (87.04 sq mi)

Population (August 1, 2026)
  - Total: 137,139
  - Density: 608/km^{2} (1,570/sq mi)
- Time zone: UTC+9 (Japan Standard Time)
- Postal: 731-5195
- Saeki Ward Office's Address: 2-5-28 Ebizono, Saeki-ku, Hiroshima City, Hiroshima Prefecture (広島県広島市佐伯区海老園二丁目5番28号)
- Website: Official site

Saeki-ku (佐伯区) is one of the eight wards of the city of Hiroshima, Japan.

The Hiroshima Branch of the Japan Mint is located here. The ward added the former town of Yuki from Saeki District on April 25, 2005.
