= Nishi-ku, Hiroshima =

Ward of the city of Hiroshima, Japan

Nishi-ku 西区
- Ward
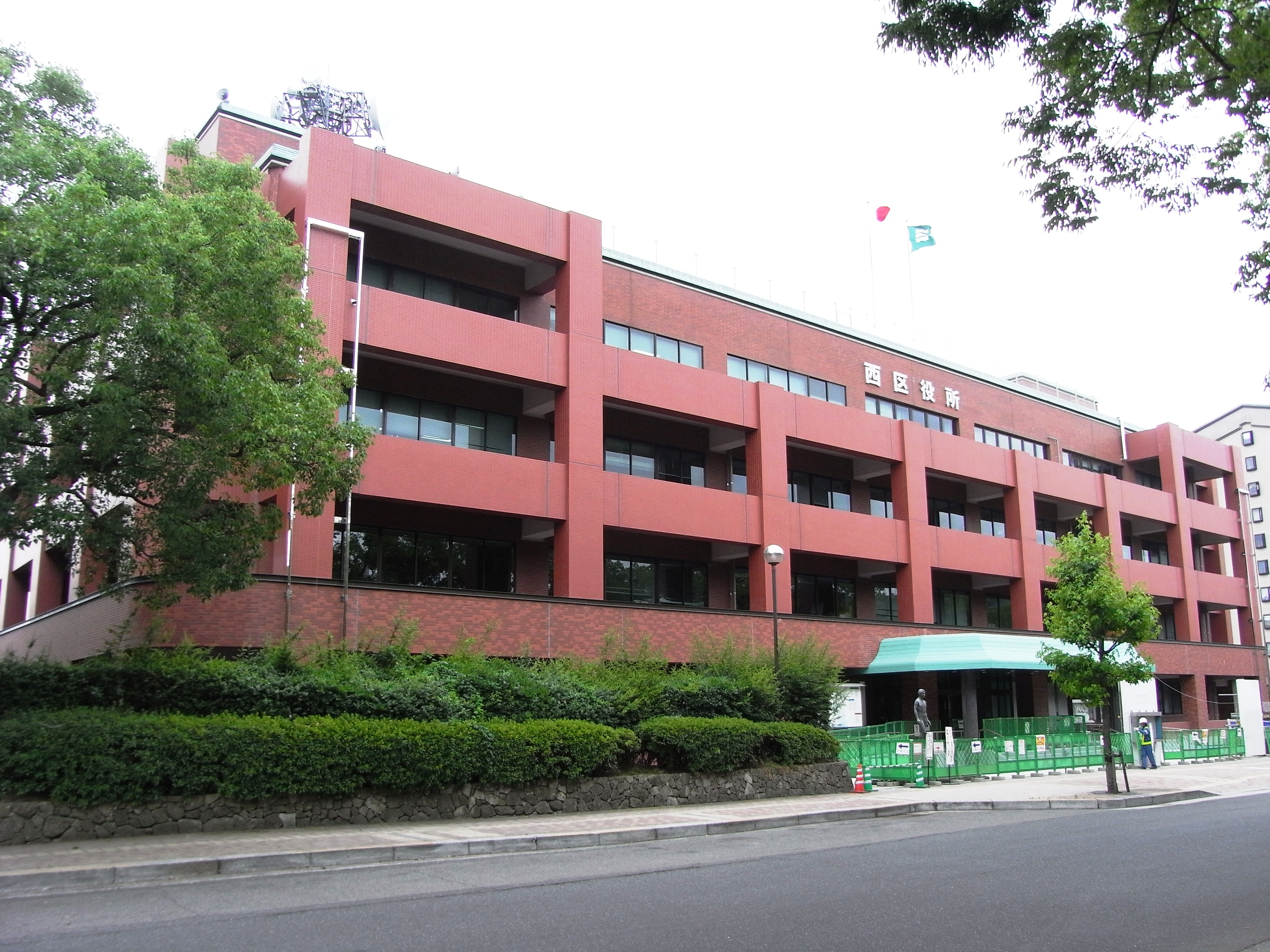
- Nishi Ward Office

- Flag Seal

- Location of Nishi-ku in Hiroshima City

- Location within Japan
- Coordinates: 34°23′38″N 132°26′4″E
- Country: Japan
- Region: Chūgoku (Sanyo)
- Prefecture: Hiroshima
- City: Hiroshima
- Established: April 1, 1980

Area
  - Total: 35.61 km^{2} (13.75 sq mi)

Population (August 1, 2026)
  - Total: 185,413
  - Density: 5,207/km^{2} (13,490/sq mi)
- Time zone: UTC+9 (Japan Standard Time)
- Postal: 733-8530
- Nishi Ward Office's Address: 2-2-1 Fukushima-cho, Nishi-ku, Hiroshima City, Hiroshima Prefecture (広島県広島市西区福島町二丁目2番1号)
- Website: Official site

Nishi-ku (西区) is one of eight wards in the city of Hiroshima, Japan. The Hiroshima–Nishi Airport was located in Nishi-ku.

== Geography ==
The ward of Nishi-ku is in the southwest part of Hiroshima. There are many mountains, but the other wards are mostly larger in area. There are many mountains in the north of the ward of Nishi-ku, and its width (geographic plane) is very narrow. It borders the ocean (Hiroshima Bay) to the south.

=== Neighbors ===
- North: Asaminami Ward
- East: Center Ward
- South: Hiroshima Bay
- West: Saeki Ward

== Economy ==
Sporting equipment companies Mikasa Sports and Molten Corporation have their headquarters in Nishi-ku.
