= Tokaichi-machi Station =

Tram stop in Hiroshima, Japan

Tokaichi-machi 十日市町
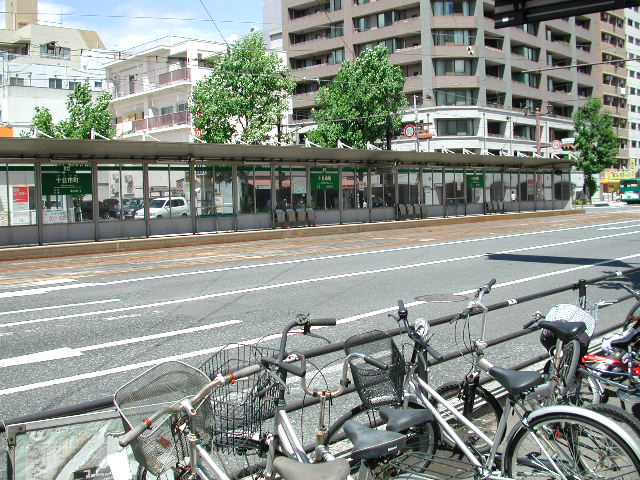

General information
- Location: Tokaichi-machi 1-chome, Naka-ku, Hiroshima; Japan
- Coordinates: 34.3976°N 132.4473°E
- Operator: Hiroshima Electric Railway
- Lines: Hiroden Main Line; Hiroden Yokogawa Line; Route 2 3 6 7 8 9

Other information
- Station code: M12, Y1

History
- Opened: November 1, 1917; 108 years ago
Location

Tokaichi-machi is a Hiroden station on the Hiroden Yokogawa Line and Hiroden Main Line, located in Tokaichi-machi, Naka-ku, Hiroshima. It is operated by the Hiroshima Electric Railway.

== Routes ==
There are six routes that serve Tera-machi Station:

- 2 Hiroshima Station - Hiroden-miyajima-guchi Route
- 3 Hiroden-nishi-hiroshima - Hiroshima Port Route
- 6 Hiroshima Station - Eba Route
- 7 Yokogawa Station - Hiroden-honsha-mae Route
- 8 Yokogawa Station - Eba Route
- 9 Hakushima - Eba Route

== Station layout ==
The station consists of three side platforms. The station is located on an intersection, and the platforms are located on the north, east, and south sides of the intersection. Crosswalks connect the platforms with the sidewalk.

=== Platforms ===
North	■ Hiroden Yokogawa Line	for Yokogawa
East	■ Hiroden Main Line	for Kamiya-cho-nishi, Hiroshima (Route 2/6), Hiroden-honsha-mae (Route 3/7), Hiroshima Port (Route 3), Hatchobori (Route 6/9), Hakushima (Route 9)
South	■ Hiroden Main Line	for Dobashi, Hiroden-nishi-hiroshima (Route 2/3), Hiroden-miyajima-guchi (Route 2), Eba (Route 6/8/9)

== Adjacent stations ==
«	Service	»
Hiroden Main Line
Honkawa-cho	Route 2	Dobashi
Honkawa-cho	Route 3	Dobashi
Honkawa-cho	Route 6	Dobashi
Honkawa-cho	Route 9	Dobashi
Hiroden Yokogawa Line
Honkawa-cho (Main Line)	Route 7	Tera-machi
Dobashi (Main Line)	Route 8	Tera-machi

== Surrounding area ==
- Tokaichi Post Office
- Ebisu Shrine

== History ==
- Opened on November 1, 1917.
- Service was stopped on June 10, 1944.
- Service restarted on December 26, 1944.

== See also ==
- Hiroden lines and routes
