= Genbaku Dome-mae Station =

Tram stop in Hiroshima, Japan

Coordinates: 34.3961°N 132.4541°E

Atomic Bomb Dome Station 原爆ドーム前
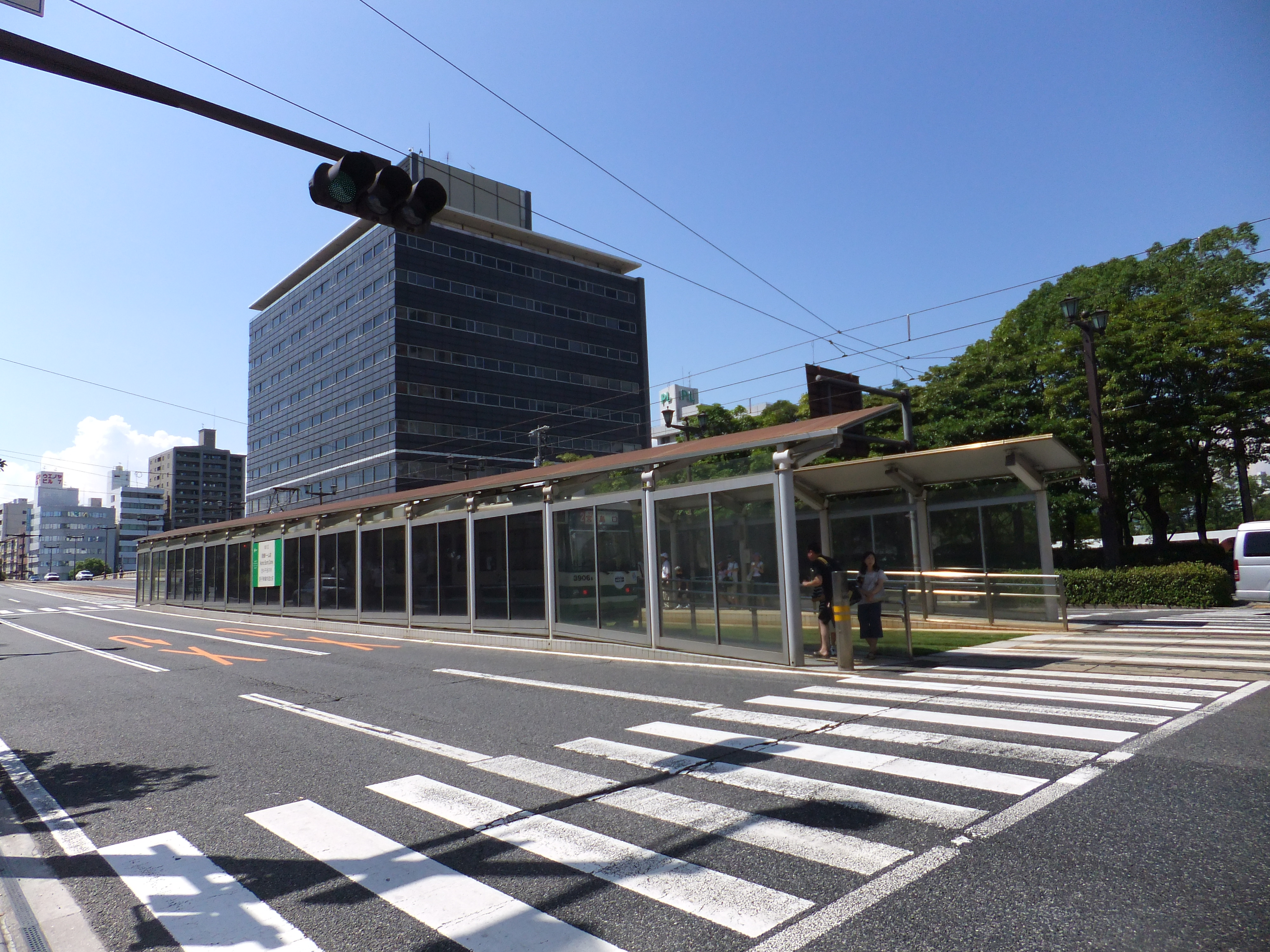

General information
- Location: Ote-machi 1-chome, Naka-ku, Hiroshima; Japan
- Operator: Hiroshima Electric Railway
- Lines: █ Hiroden Main Line; Route

Other information
- Station code: M10

History
- Opened: November 23, 1912
Location

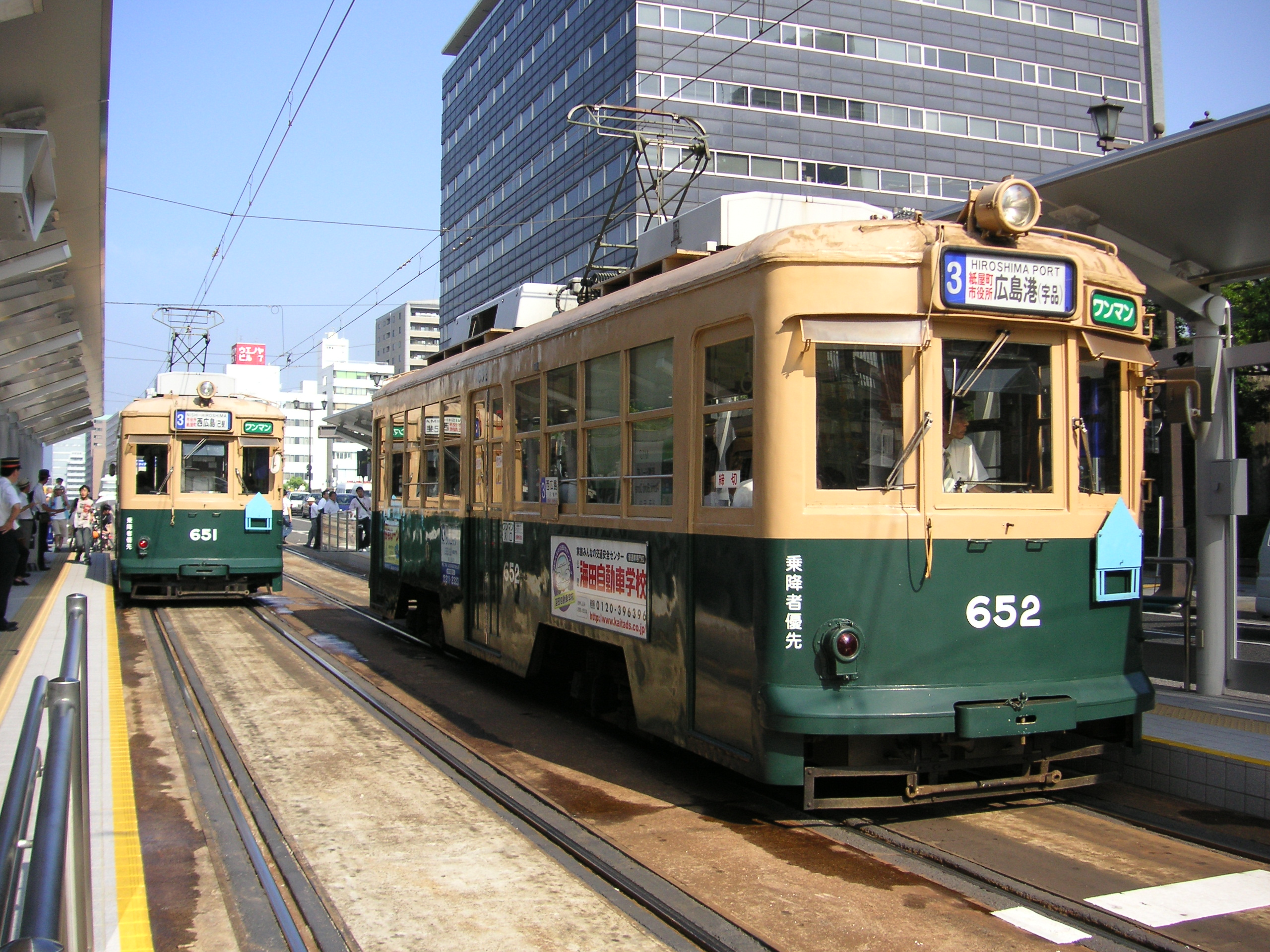
A-Bomb memorial car 651 and 652 at Genbaku Dome-mae in 2006 A-Bomb Memorial Day

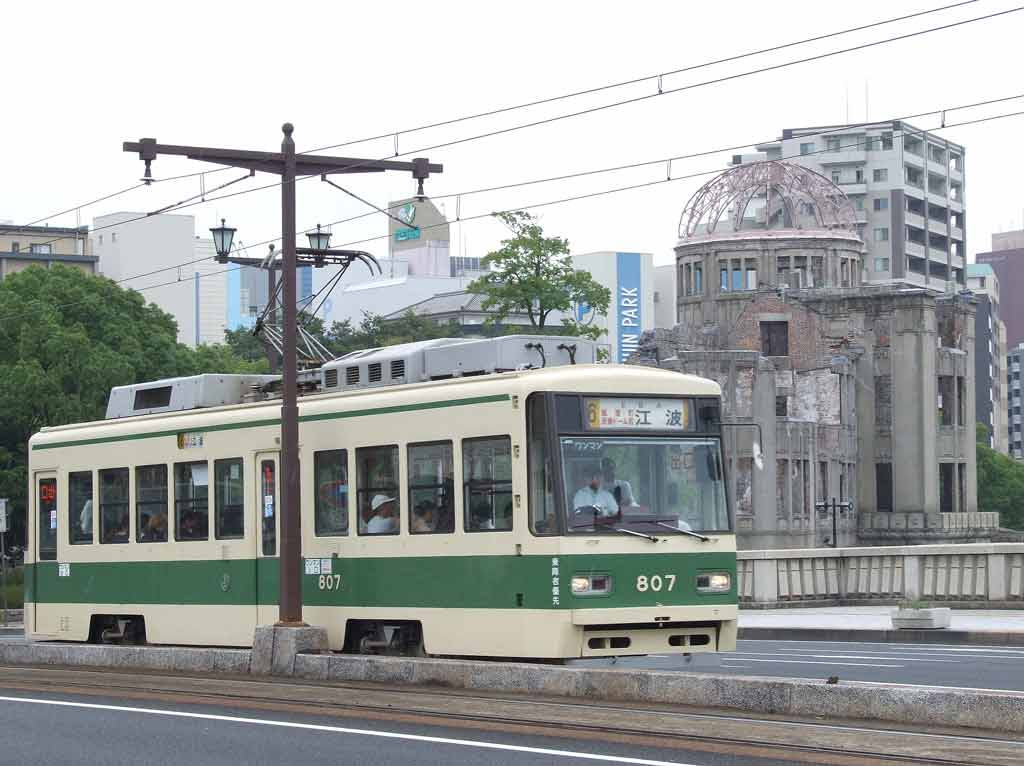
Right after the tram left the station to "Honkawa-cho", the tram across "Aioi bridge", and "Atomic Bomb Dome" can be seen on the left (south)

Genbaku Dome-mae (Atomic Bomb Dome) is a Hiroden tram stop on the Hiroden Main Line, located in front of the Hiroshima Peace Memorial in Ote-machi 1-chome, Naka-ku, Hiroshima, Japan.

== Routes ==
From Genbaku Dome-mae Station, there are four of Hiroden Streetcar routes.

- Hiroshima Station - Hiroden-miyajima-guchi Route
- Hiroden-nishi-hiroshima - Hiroshima Port Route
- Hiroshima Station - Eba Route
- Yokogawa Station - Hiroden-honsha-mae Route

== Connections ==
█ Main Line

Kamiya-cho-nishi—Genbaku Dome-mae (Atomic Bomb Dome)—Honkawa-cho

== Around station ==
- Hiroshima Peace Memorial
- Hiroshima Peace Memorial Park
- Hiroshima Municipal Stadium
- Aioi Bridge - the target of the Atomic Bomb
- ALSOK Hall
- Sogo
- Hiroshima City Children's Library
- Hiroshima Children's Museum

== History ==
- Completion was started on November 23, 1912.
- Opened as "Yagura-no-shita" on December 8, 1912.
- Renamed to "Aioi-bashi" in 1929.
- Service was stopped on June 10, 1944 due to World War II.
- Service restarted on September 7, 1945 after World War II.
- Renamed to "Genbaku Dome-mae" on December 16, 1974.

== See also ==
- Hiroden lines and routes
- List of railway stations in Japan
