= Honkawa-cho Station =

Tram stop in Hiroshima, Japan

Coordinates: 34.3968°N 132.4507°E

Honkawa-cho 本川町
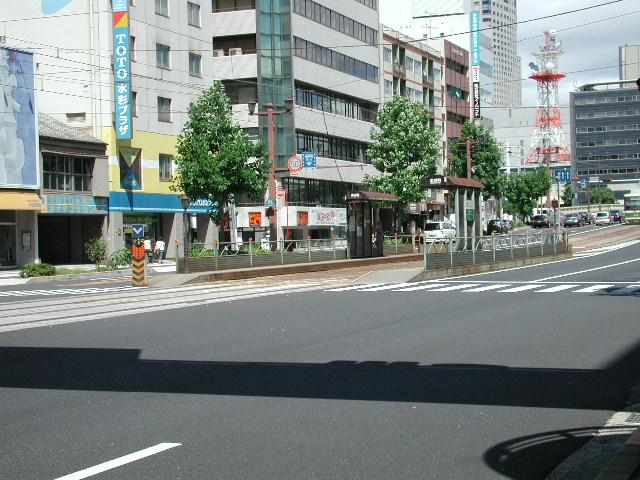

General information
- Location: Honkawa-cho 1-chome, Naka-ku, Hiroshima; Japan
- Operator: Hiroshima Electric Railway
- Lines: █ Hiroden Main Line; Route

Other information
- Station code: M11

History
- Opened: December 8, 1912
Location

Honkawa-cho is a Hiroden station (tram stop) on Hiroden Main Line, located in Honkawa-cho 1-chome, Naka-ku, Hiroshima.

== Routes ==
From Honkawa-cho Station, there are four of Hiroden Streetcar routes.

- Hiroshima Station - Hiroden-miyajima-guchi Route
- Hiroden-nishi-hiroshima - Hiroshima Port Route
- Hiroshima Station - Eba Route
- Yokogawa Station - Hiroden-honsha-mae Route

== Connections ==
█ Main Line

Genbaku Dome-mae (Atomic Bomb Dome) — Honkawa-cho — Tokaichi-machi

== Around station ==
- Hiroshima City Honkawa Elementary School
  - Honkawa Elementary School Peace Museum
- Hiroshima Peace Memorial Park
  - Hiroshima Peace Memorial
  - Children's Peace Monument
  - Hiroshima Peace Memorial Museum
- KKR Hiroshimakinen Hospital

== History ==
- Opened as "Sakan-cho" on December 8, 1912.
- Became a junction stop between Yokogawa Route and Others, on November 1, 1917.
- Renamed to the present name "Honkawa-cho" on April 1, 1965.

== See also ==
- Hiroden lines and routes
