= Yokogawa Station =

Railway station in Hiroshima, Japan

Yokogawa Station 横川駅
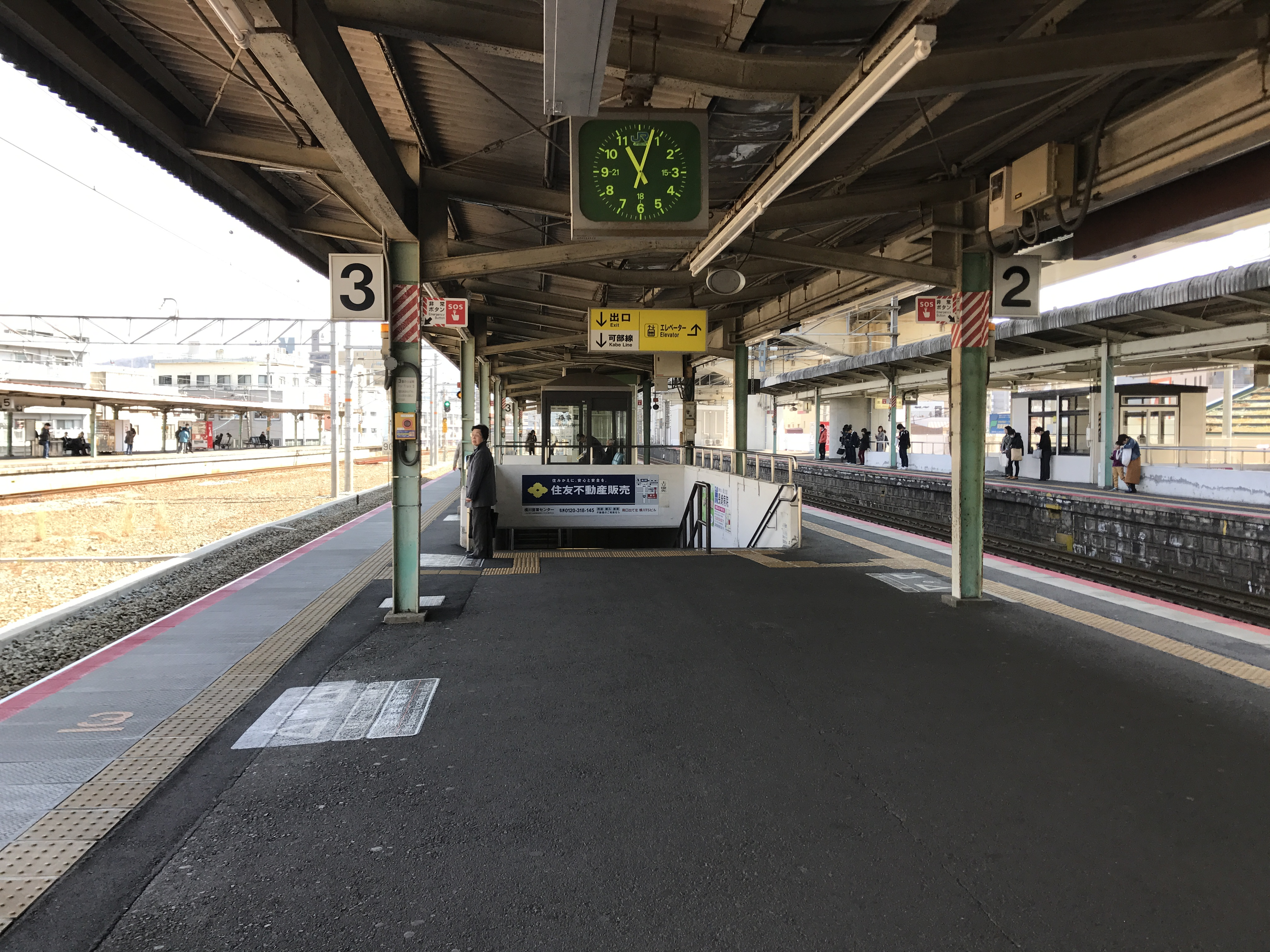

General information
- Location: 3-2 Yokogawa-chō, Nishi Ward, Hiroshima City; Hiroshima Prefecture; Japan
- Coordinates: 34°24′35″N 132°27′2″E
- Operator: JR West; Hiroden
Location
- Location within Hiroshima Prefecture Location within Japan

Yokogawa Station (横川駅, Yokogawa-eki) is a railway station in Yokogawa-cho, Nishi-ku, Hiroshima, Hiroshima Prefecture, Japan, operated by the West Japan Railway Company (JR West) and Hiroshima Electric Railway (Hiroden).

== Lines ==
Yokogawa Station is served by the following lines:

- JR West

- R Sanyo Main Line
- B Kabe Line

- Hiroshima Electric Railway

- Hiroden Yokogawa Line

== Station layout ==
=== JR West ===
Yokogawa Station 横川駅
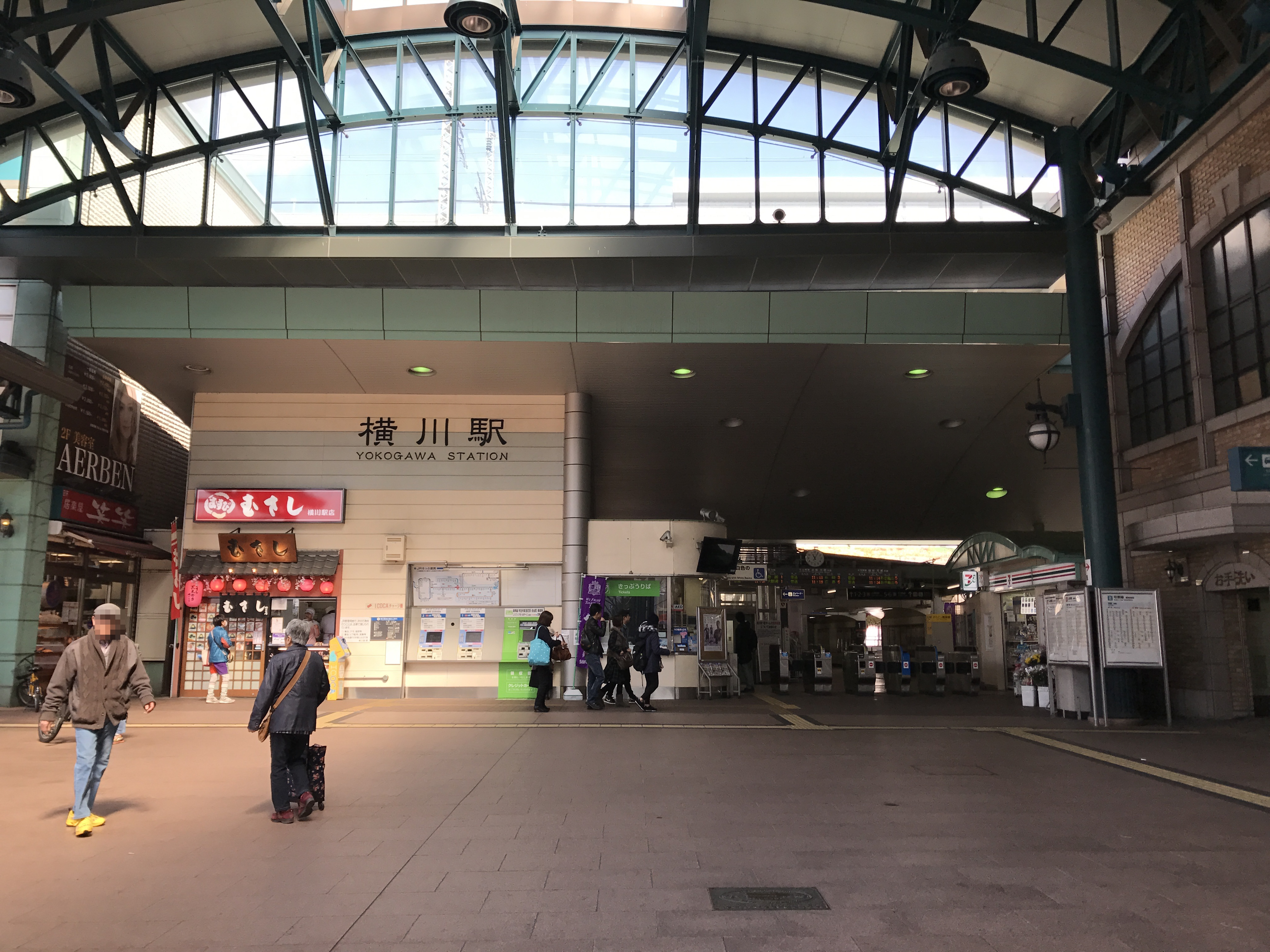
- Concourse of the JR West Yokogawa Station in March 2017

General information
- Operator: JR West
- Lines: R Sanyo Main Line; B Kabe Line
- Platforms: 2 island platforms, 1 side platform
- Tracks: 5

Construction
- Structure type: Elevated

Other information
- Station code: JR-R03; JR-B03
- Website: Official website

History
- Opened: 25 September 1897; 128 years ago

Passengers
- FY2020: 13,364 daily

Services
Preceding station	JR West	Following station
Itsukaichi towards Iwakuni	San'yō Line City Liner	Hiroshima Terminus
Nishi-Hiroshima towards Iwakuni	San'yō Line Rapid	Shin-Hakushima towards Hiroshima
Nishi-Hiroshima towards Iwakuni	San'yō Line Local	Shin-Hakushima towards Hiroshima
Mitaki towards Aki-Kameyama	Kabe Line	Shin-Hakushima towards Hiroshima
Location

The Kabe Line and the Sanyō Main Line stop at the JR West Yokogawa Station. The Kabe Line has an island platform serving two tracks. The Sanyō Main Line has a side platform and an island platform serving three tracks. The center track of the Sanyō Main Line is not used during regular service. There is a railway junction east of the station, where the Kabe Line and the Sanyō Main Line merge.

There are two entrances to the JR West Yokogawa Station on the north and south sides of the station.

==== Platforms ====
1	■ Sanyo Main Line	for Miyajimaguchi, Iwakuni, and Tokuyama
2	■ Sanyo Main Line	(not normally used)
3	■ Sanyo Main Line	for Hiroshima, Saijō, Mihara, connection to Kure Line
5	■ Kabe Line	for Ōmachi, Kabe, and Aki-Kameyama
6	■ Kabe Line	for Hiroshima

=== Hiroshima Electric Railway ===
Yokogawa Station 横川駅
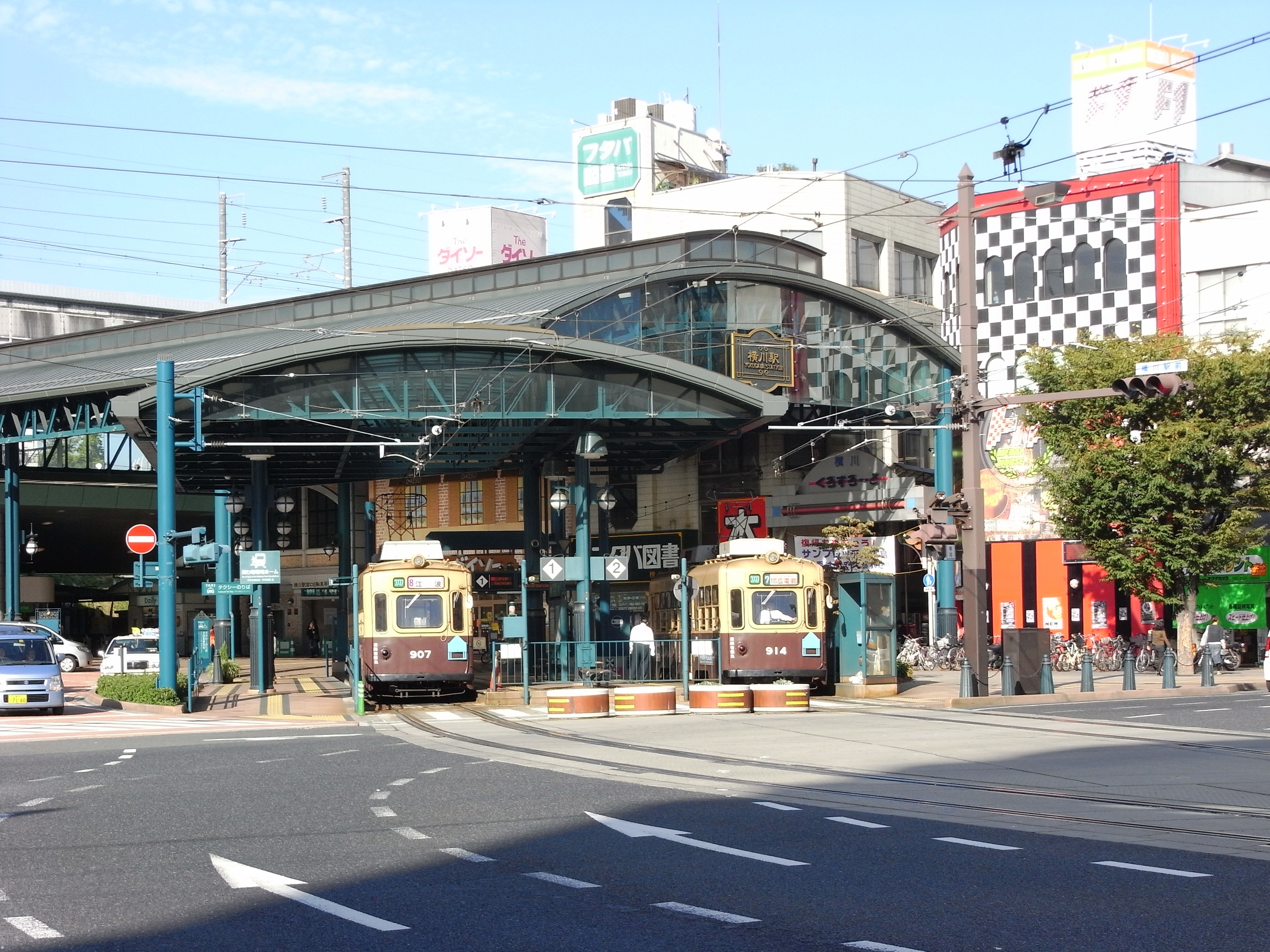
- Tram terminal

General information
- Operator: Hiroden
- Lines: Hiroden Yokogawa Line; Routes 7 and 8
- Platforms: 1 island platform
- Tracks: 2

Other information
- Station code: Y5

History
- Opened: November 1, 1917
Location

Yokogawa Station is the terminus station for the Hiroden Yokogawa Line, and is also the terminus station for Route 7 and Route 8. There is one island platform serving two tracks. It is located directly outside the south entrance of the JR West station. A large roof extending from the main station building covers the station platform and tracks. The station formerly had tram tracks between the JR West platforms, but these have since been removed.

==== Platforms ====
1-2	■ Route 7	for Tokaichi-machi, Hondori, and Hiroden-honsha-mae
1-2	■ Route 8	for Tokaichi-machi, Eba

==== Adjacent stations ====
«	Service	»
Hiroden Yokogawa Line
Yokogawa 1-chome	Route 7	Terminus
Yokogawa 1-chome	Route 8	Terminus

== History ==
=== JR West ===
Yokogawa Station first opened on 25 September 1897 as part of the Sanyō Railway.

On 1 December 1906, Yokogawa Station was nationalized, becoming part of Japanese Government Railways (JGR).

The Kabe Line portion of the station opened on December 19, 1909.

With the privatization of Japanese National Railways (JNR) on 1 April 1987, the station came under the control of JR West.

=== Hiroshima Electric Railway ===
- Opened "Yokogawa" and "Misasa" tram stops on November 1, 1917.
- Renamed from "Misasa" to "Yokogawa" in 1926.
- Removed the former "Yokogawa" tram stop on July 28, 1941.
- Moved on July 19, 1951.
- Renamed from "Yokogawa" to "Yokogawa Station" on November 1, 2001.
- Moved to the present place on March 27, 2003.

=== First bus service in Japan ===
On 5 February 1905, the first bus service in Japan began operating between Yokogawa and Kabe stations.

The first omnibus used in Japan is now housed in a display at the station.

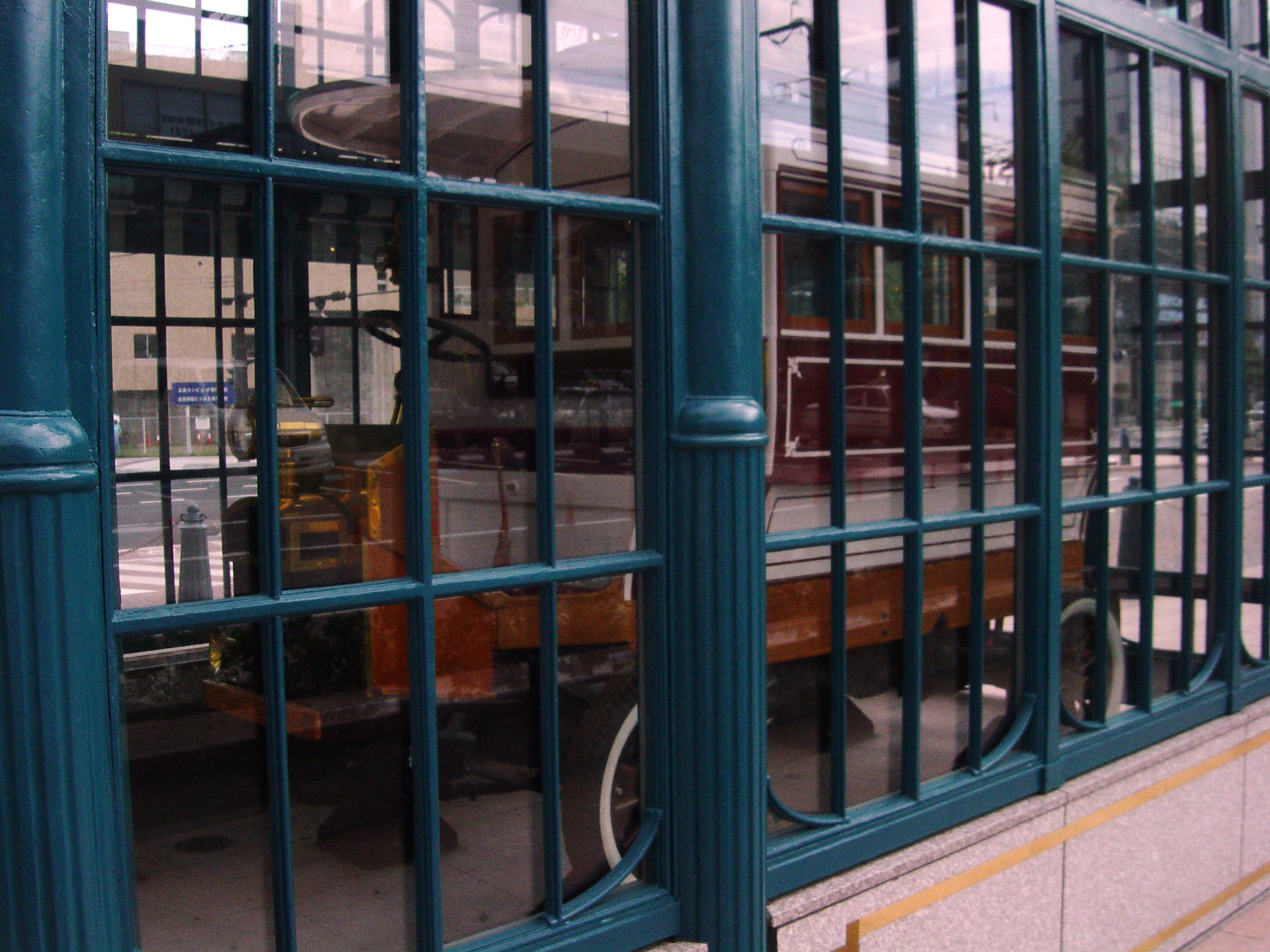
Display of Japan's first bus at Yokogawa Station in April 2004

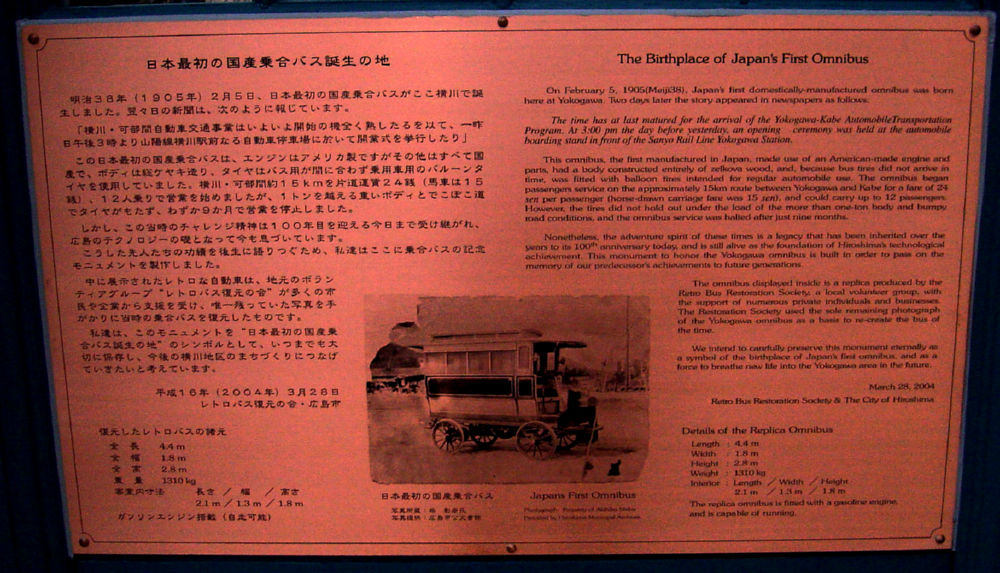
Placard about Japan's first bus at Yokogawa Station in April 2004

== Surrounding area ==
- National Route 54
- Hiroshima Yokogawa Post Office
- Ōta River

== See also ==
- List of railway stations in Japan
