= Funairi-minami Station =

Tram stop in Hiroshima, Japan

Funairi-minami Station 舟入南
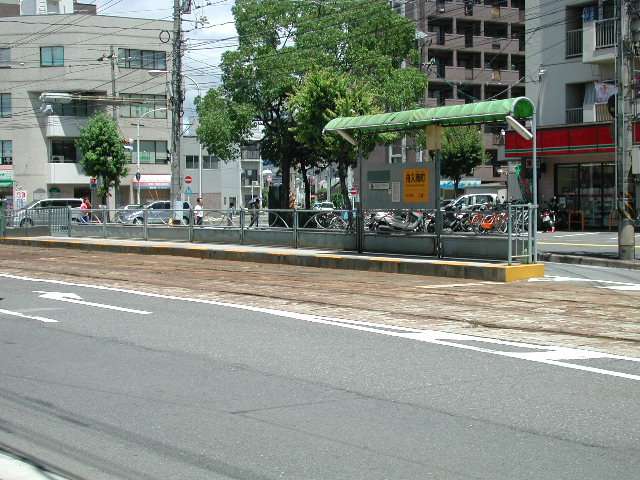

General information
- Location: Funairi-minami 5-chome, Naka-ku, Hiroshima; Japan
- Coordinates: 34.3750°N 132.4373°E
- Operator: Hiroshima Electric Railway
- Lines: Hiroden Eba Line; Route 6 8 9
- Platforms: 2 side platforms

Other information
- Station code: E5

History
- Opened: June 20, 1944
- Former names: Funairi-minami-machi (until 2019)
Location

Funairi-minami is a Hiroden station on the Hiroden Eba Line located in Funairi-minami, Naka-ku, Hiroshima. It is operated by the Hiroshima Electric Railway.

== Routes ==
There are three routes that serve Funairi-minami Station:

- 6 Hiroshima Station - Eba Route
- 8 Yokogawa Station - Eba Route
- 9 Hakushima - Eba Route

== Station layout ==
The station consists of two staggered side platforms serving two tracks. Crosswalks connect the platforms with the sidewalk. There is a small shelter located on each platform.

== Adjacent stations ==
«	Service	»
Hiroden Eba Line
Funairi-kawaguchi-cho	Route 6	Eba
Funairi-kawaguchi-cho	Route 8	Eba
Funairi-kawaguchi-cho	Route 9	Eba

== Bus connections ==
- Hiroden Bus Route #6 at Funairi-minami bus stop

== Surrounding area ==
- Hiroshima City Commercial High School
- Funairi Shrine

== History ==
- Opened on June 20, 1944.
- Renamed to "Eba-guchi" on November 1, 1947.
- Renamed to "Gurando-guchi" on January 8, 1954.
- Renamed to "Funairi-minami-machi" in 1960.
- Moved in 2002.
- Renamed to "Funairi-minami" on April 1, 2019.

== See also ==
- Hiroden lines and routes
