= Betsuin-mae Station =

Tram stop in Hiroshima, Japan

Betsuin-mae 別院前
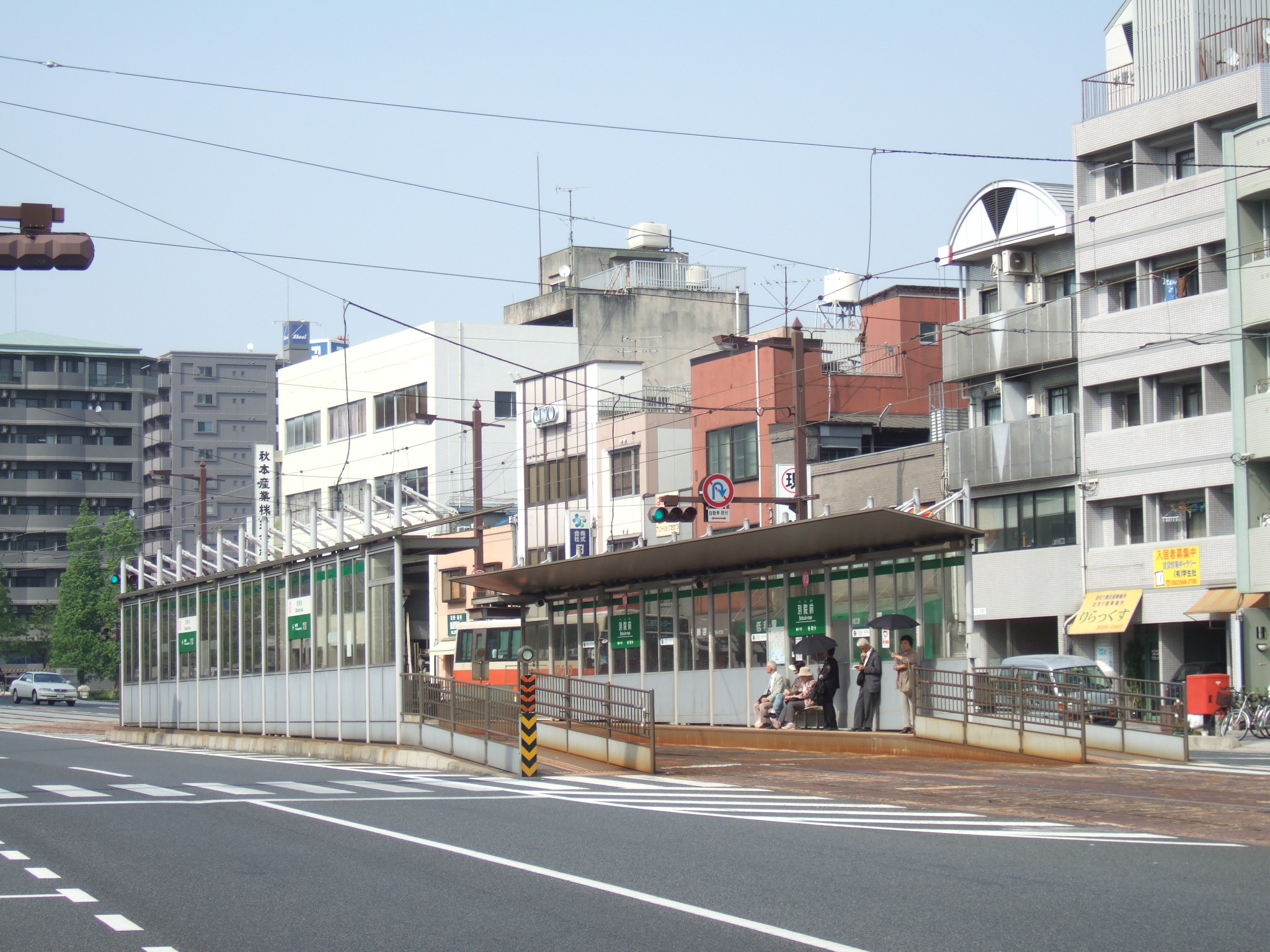
- The station platform

General information
- Location: Hirose-kita-machi, Nishi-ku, Hiroshima; Japan
- Coordinates: 34°24′15″N 132°26′57″E
- Operator: Hiroshima Electric Railway
- Lines: Hiroden Yokogawa Line; Route 7 and 8

Other information
- Station code: Y3

History
- Opened: November 1, 1917; 108 years ago
Location

Betsuin-mae is a Hiroden station on Hiroden Yokogawa Line, located in Hirose-kita-machi, Nishi-ku, Hiroshima. It is operated by the Hiroshima Electric Railway.

== Routes ==
There are two routes that serve Betsuin-mae Station:

- 7 Yokogawa Station - Hiroden-honsha-mae Route
- 8 Yokogawa Station - Eba Route

== Station layout ==
The station consists of two side platforms serving two tracks. There are roofs providing shelter for the whole length of the platforms. Access to the platforms is via a crosswalk.

== Adjacent stations ==
«	Service	»
Hiroden Yokogawa Line
Tera-machi	Route 7	Yokogawa 1-chome
Tera-machi	Route 8	Yokogawa 1-chome

== Surrounding area ==
- Hongan-ji Hiroshima Betsuin

== History ==
- Opened as "Yokogawa-bashi" on November 1, 1917
- Renamed to the present name "Betsuin-mae" in 1926.

== See also ==
- Hiroden lines and routes
