= Miyuki-bashi Station =

Tram stop in Hiroshima, Japan

Coordinates: 34.3752°N 132.4594°E

Miyuki-bashi 御幸橋

General information
- Location: Senda-machi 3-chome, Naka-ku, Hiroshima; Japan
- Operator: Hiroshima Electric Railway
- Lines: █ Hiroden Ujina Line; Route

Other information
- Station code: U8

History
- Opened: November 23, 1912
Location

Miyuki-bashi is a Hiroden station tram stop on Hiroden Ujina Line located in Senda-machi 3-chome, Naka-ku, Hiroshima.

== Routes ==
From Miyuki-bashi Station, there are two of Hiroden Streetcar routes.

- Hiroshima Station - Hiroshima Port Route
- Hiroden-nishi-hiroshima - Hiroshima Port Route

== Connections ==
█ Ujina Line

Hiroden-honsha-mae — Miyuki-bashi — Minami-machi 6-chome

== Other services connections ==
=== Hiroden Bus services routes ===
- Route #12 at "Miyuki-bashi" bus stop

=== Hiroshima Bus services routes ===
- Route #21-1 and #50 at "Miyuki-bashi" bus stop
- Route #50 at "Shudo-gakuen-mae" bus stop

== Around station ==
- Miyuki-bashi (Miyuki bridge)
- Shudo Junior High School, Shudo High School
- Hiroshima Beauty College
- Hiroshima Naka-ku sports center

== History ==
- Opened on November 23, 1912.
- Closed from June 10, 1944 to August 16, 1945.
- Reopened on August 17, 1945.

== See also ==
- Hiroden lines and routes
