= Tera-machi Station =

Tram stop in Hiroshima, Japan

Tera-machi 寺町
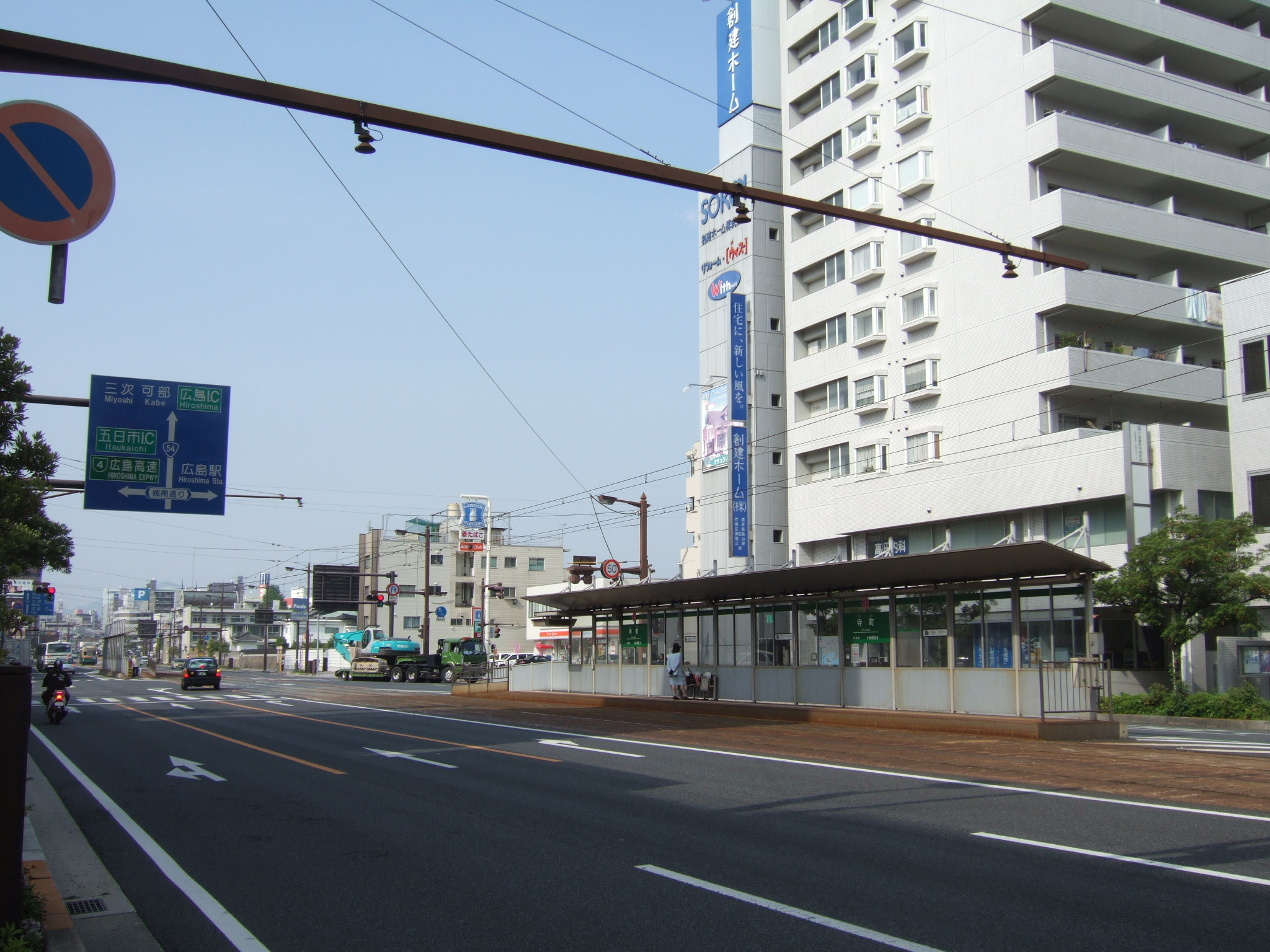
- The station platforms

General information
- Location: Hirose-machi, Nishi-ku, Hiroshima; Japan
- Coordinates: 34°24′03″N 132°26′53″E
- Operator: Hiroshima Electric Railway
- Lines: Hiroden Yokogawa Line; Route 7 and 8

Other information
- Station code: Y2

History
- Opened: November 1, 1917; 108 years ago
Location

Tera-machi is a Hiroden station on the Hiroden Yokogawa Line, located in Hirose-machi, Nishi-ku, Hiroshima. It is operated by the Hiroshima Electric Railway.

== Routes ==
There are two routes that serve Tera-machi Station:

- 7 Yokogawa Station - Hiroden-honsha-mae Route
- 8 Yokogawa Station - Eba Route

== Station layout ==
The station consists of two staggered side platforms serving two tracks. There are roofs providing shelter for the whole length of the platforms. Access to the platforms are via crosswalks.

== Adjacent stations ==
| « | Service | » |
Hiroden Yokogawa Line
| Tokaichi-machi | Route 7 | Betsuin-mae |
| Tokaichi-machi | Route 8 | Betsuin-mae |

== Surrounding area ==
- Hirose Elementary School

== History ==
- Opened as "Nishino-kouji" on November 1, 1917.
- Renamed to "Tera-machi-ura" in 1927.
- Renamed to the present name "Tera-machi" station on April 1, 1965.

== See also ==
- Hiroden lines and routes
