= Green Mover Max =

Japanese low-floor light-rail vehicle

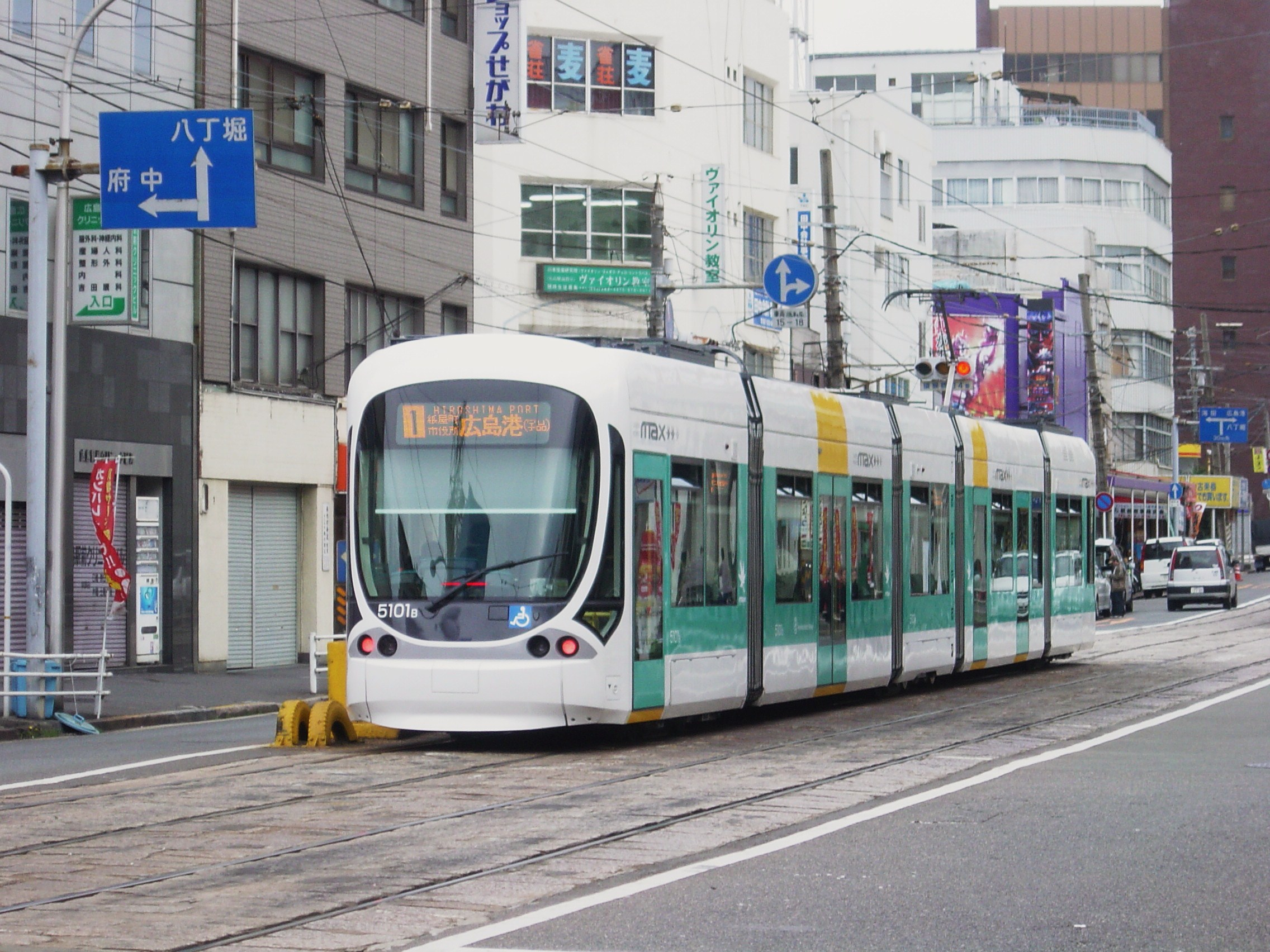
A Green Mover Max tram in Hiroshima

The Green Mover Max was the first 100% low-floor articulated Light Rail Vehicle (LRV) to be built entirely in Japan. It was developed jointly by Kinki Sharyo, Mitsubishi Heavy Industries, and Toyo Denki, and introduced first in Hiroshima by the Hiroshima Electric Railway Company (Hiroden). It replaced Hiroden's ailing fleet of Siemens Combinos in 2005.

== History: Project U3 ==
In 1998, Siemens won a contract from Hiroden for supplying what was at the time, its latest line of LF-LRT (low floor - light rail transit) streetcars called the Combinos. Hiroden was also the first operator outside Germany to purchase Combinos, starting with 12 units.

According to Hattori, the development of LF-LRVs in Japan was delayed by several factors: overseas manufacturers held patents on many of the basic technologies; low domestic demand increased development risks and established fare-collection protocols. This poor development environment changed in November 2000 when the Barrier-Free Transportation Law was passed. This law required that operators respect accessibility standards when introducing new rolling stock and provided subsidies as tax-relief and tax-exemptions to compensate for the price differences between conventional cars and the more expensive barrier-free designs.

A year later, in 2001, Ministry of Land, Infrastructure, Transport and Tourism (Japan) brought together a group of eight manufacturers who worked on the latest LF-LRT designs to develop a fully Japanese product. This product was to improve upon many Combino features such as low-floor (now down to 360 mm (14.2 in); 330 mm (13.0 in) at doorways); VVVF (variable voltage variable frequency) motor capable of regenerative braking, maximum service speeds of 80 km/h (50 mph), and LRVs for both 1,435 mm (4 ft 8 1/2 in) standard gauge and 1,067 mm (3 ft 6 in) narrow gauge.

Soon, three Japanese companies formed a consortium for creating an improved LRT that was better adapted for local running conditions - Kinki Sharyo, Mitsubishi Heavy Industries (MHI), and Toyo Electric Co. Christened as the "U3 Project", the aim of this collaborative effort was to create a "100% ultra-low-floor articulated light rail vehicle (LRV)" that would be the "Ultimate", "Urban", "User-friendly" Light Rail Vehicle.

Project U3 aimed to create a vehicle that was more spacious in terms of passenger capacity, more reliable, and, for which, most of the components could be manufacturer in Japan itself. Specific tasks were allotted to each of the four collaborators - MHI took over bogies, brakes, and inner/outer rigging; Kinki Sharyo focused on design, car body, articulations, and drivers cabin; while Toyo Denki Seizo took responsibility for electric parts and control and drive units.

Hiroden was closely involved in this project as its “operation-service” adviser. The result was the "Green Mover Max", a vehicle that had more passenger seats, wider aisles (830 mm (32.7 in) – to enable movement of wheelchairs) and lower dependence on foreign patented technology & component makers.

The key to the development of an indigenous 100% low-floor LRV was the bogie with an independent wheel system, similar to the shaft-less wheel connection to the Combinos. Also similar was the placement of motor and drive unit installed to the outer side of the wheel, which helped in achieving a low-floor vehicle.

Providentially for the Japanese manufacturers, the Combinos started giving problems within a couple of years. On Combino cars that had run more than 150,000 km (93,206 mi), cracks were reported on the connections between the sidewalls and the roof girders such that the safety of passengers in the wheel-less modules could not be assured in the event of a severe collision. This was not a problem specific to Hiroshima - similar problems were reported in other cities that had adopted the Siemens-Combinos, such as Düsseldorf, Freiburg, Augsburg, Erfurt, Nordhausen, Basel, Potsdam, Bern, Amsterdam and Melbourne. In March 2004 Siemens Transport Systems confirmed that body-shell problems were emerging at high mileages and it advised all operators to take out about 400 Combinos that had run more than 120,000 km (74,565 mi).

This flaw in the Siemens Combino led to the speedy introduction of the GreenMover into the Japanese market, in 2005.

== New models ==
The Green Mover Max consisted of five articulated sections on three cars, two of which were powered. The motors and gears were mounted outside the wheels, allowing them to rotate independently – as in the case of the Combinos.

The Green Mover T-5000 soon evolved into T5100 which had even better specifications – the seats were made more comfortable with spacious sofa seats being used in the front cars and the number of seats was increased from 52 to 62. The next version, Green Mover T5100, had wider aisles: 830 mm (32.7 in) in the 5000 series to 880 mm (34.6 in) in the front cars and 1,120 mm (44.1 in) in Car E, the middle car, of the 5100 series, making for a smoother flow of passengers through the cars. It was more comfortable for both seated and standing passengers. Also most components are made locally, thereby providing reliability and enhanced maintenance.

== See also ==
- Trams in Asia
- Low-floor tram
