= Hiroden Yokogawa Line =

Tram line in Hiroshima, Japan

The Yokogawa Line (横川線, Yokogawa-sen) is a street-car line of Hiroshima Electric Railway (Hiroden) in Hiroshima, Japan. The line has been operated since 1917 (109 years ago).

The total distance of the line is 1.4 kilometers (0.87 mi). Routes 7 and 8 operate on the line. The line has five stations, numbered Y1 through Y5.

== Stations ==
No.	Station	Routes	Connections
M11	Tokaichi-machi		█ Hiroden Main Line
Y01	Tera-machi		
Y02	Betsuin-mae		
Y03	Yokogawa 1-chome		
Y04	Yokogawa Station		JR lines at JR Yokogawa Station █ JR Sanyo Main Line █ JR Kabe Line
