= Hiroden-honsha-mae Station =

Tram stop in Hiroshima, Japan

Coordinates: 34.3776°N 132.4572°E

Hiroden-honsha-mae 広電本社前
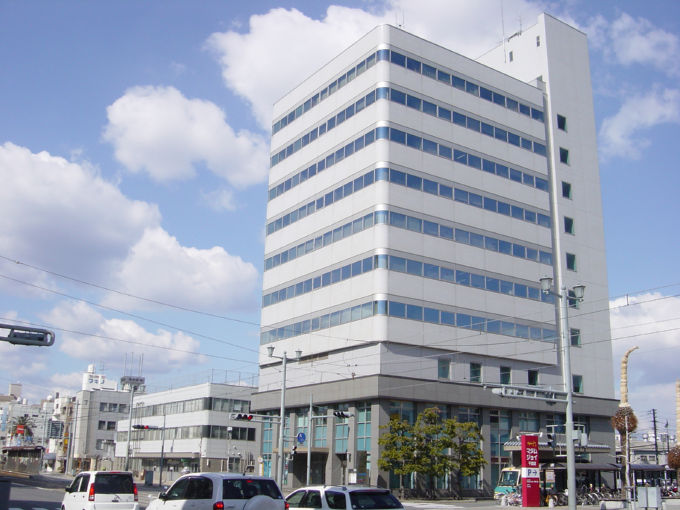

General information
- Location: Senda-machi 3-chome, Naka-ku, Hiroshima; Japan
- Operator: Hiroshima Electric Railway
- Lines: █ Hiroden Ujina Line; Route

Other information
- Station code: U7

History
- Opened: November 23, 1912
Location

Hiroden-honsha-mae is a Hiroden station (tram stop) on Hiroden Ujina Line located in front of Hiroden Head Office, in Senda-machi 3-chome, Naka-ku, Hiroshima. It's the terminal stop of route #7.

== Routes ==
From Hiroden-honsha-mae Station, there are three of Hiroden Streetcar routes.

- Hiroshima Station - Hiroshima Port Route
- Hiroden-nishi-hiroshima - Hiroshima Port Route
- Yokogawa Station - Hiroden-honsha-mae Route

== Connections ==
█ Ujina Line

Nisseki-byoin-mae — Hiroden-honsha-mae — Miyuki-bashi

Nisseki-byoin-mae — Hiroden-honsha-mae (terminal stop)

== Other services connections ==
=== Hiroden Bus services routes ===
- Route #12 at "Hiroden-ball-mae" bus stop

=== Hiroshima Bus services routes ===
- Route #21-1 and #50 at "Hiroden-mae" bus stop

== Around station ==
- Hiroden Head Office
- Hiroden Senda-shako
- Hiroshima Naka-ku sports center
- Hiroshima Prefectural Library

== History ==
- Opened as "Hatsudensho-mae" on November 23, 1912.
- Renamed to "Dantetsu-mae" in 1927.
- Renamed to the present name "Hiroden-honsha-mae", on March 16, 1958.

== See also ==
- Hiroden lines and routes
