= Eba Station =

Tram stop in Hiroshima, Japan

Eba Station 江波
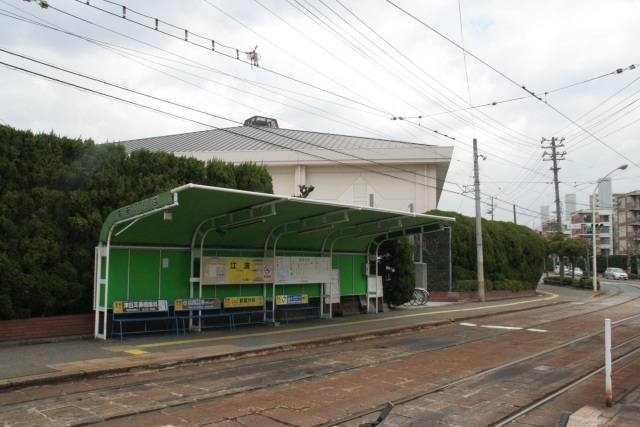

General information
- Location: Eba-nishi 1-chome, Naka-ku, Hiroshima; Japan
- Coordinates: 34.3724°N 132.4360°E
- Operator: Hiroshima Electric Railway
- Lines: Hiroden Eba Line; Route 6 8 9
- Platforms: 2 side platforms

Other information
- Station code: E6

History
- Opened: June 20, 1944
Location

Eba Station is a Hiroden terminal station on the Hiroden Eba Line located in Eba-nishi, Naka-ku, Hiroshima, Japan. A streetcar and bus depot is located behind the station. The station is operated by the Hiroshima Electric Railway.

== Routes ==
There are three routes that serve Eba Station:

- 6 Hiroshima Station - Eba Route
- 8 Yokogawa Station - Eba Route
- 9 Hakushima - Eba Route

== Station layout ==
The station consists of two side platforms serving two tracks. There is a large shelter located on the outbound platform.

== Adjacent stations ==
«	Service	»
Hiroden Eba Line
Funairi-minami-machi	Route 6	Terminus
Funairi-minami-machi	Route 8	Terminus
Funairi-minami-machi	Route 9	Terminus

== Bus connections ==
- Hiroden Bus Route #6 at Hiroden Eba Office bus stop

== Surrounding area ==
- Hiroshima City Ebayama Museum of Meteorology
- Mitsubishi Heavy Industries Hiroshima Machinery Works
- Hiroden Eba-shako - (streetcar and bus shed)
- Hiroden Eba Office
- Hiroshima City Eba Junior High School
- Hiroshima Municipal Eba Elementary School
- Eba Shrine

== History ==
- Opened on June 20, 1944.
- Renamed to "Eba-guchi" on November 1, 1947.
- Moved on January 7, 1954 when the train and bus shed was built.
- Renamed to "Eba" in 1963.

== See also ==
- Hiroden lines and routes
