= Trams in Asia =

Trams in Asia were well established at the start of the 20th century, but started to decline in use in the 1930s. By the 1960s, the majority of systems had been closed down. Extensive legacy tramways still exist in Japan. Recently, more modern systems have been built in China.

== Cambodia ==
In Cambodia, tram networks once ran in Siem Reap and Battambang. Trams in Cambodia were known as "bamboo train" and using Werkspoor and Beijnes tram fleets.

== Mainland China ==
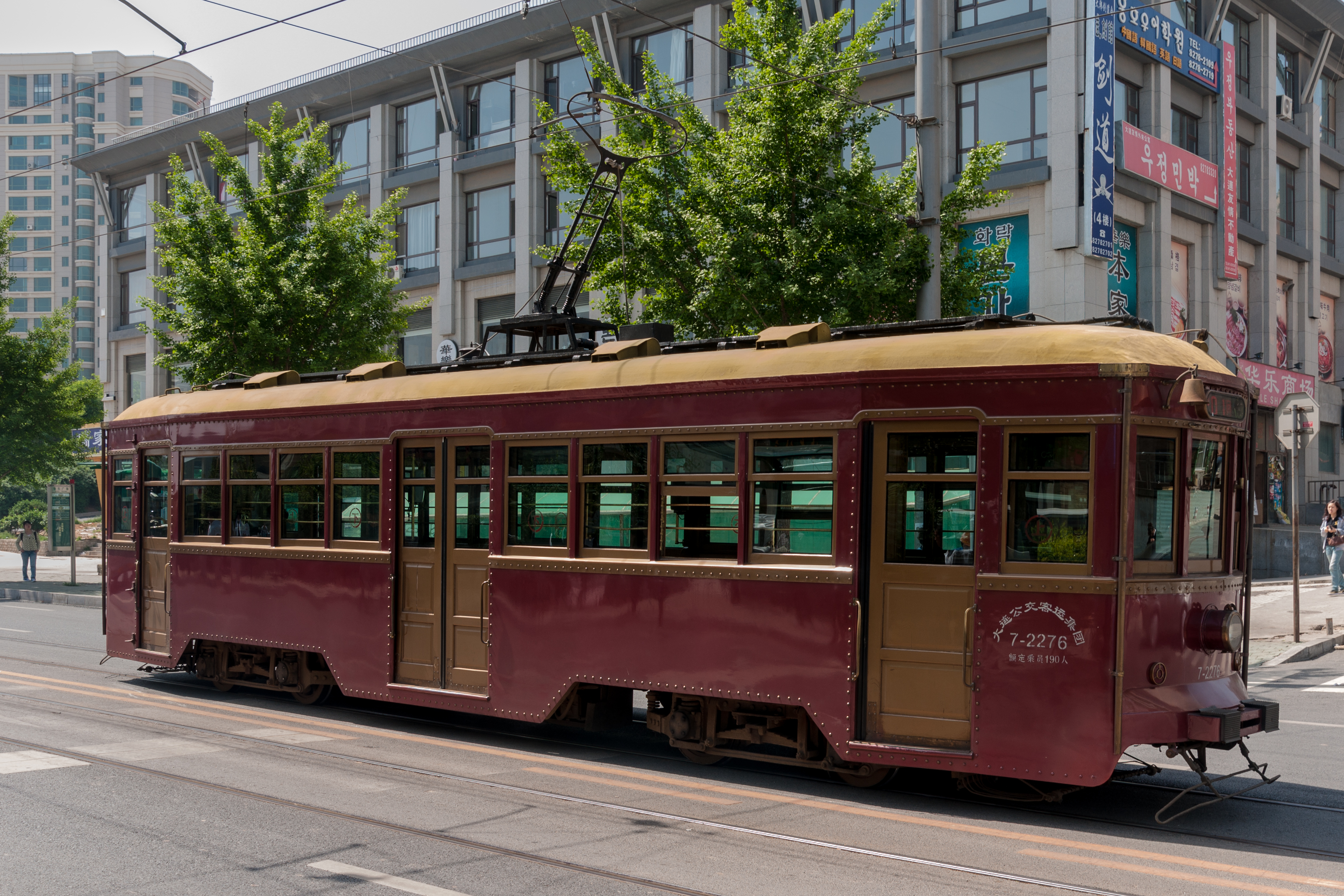
Dalian historical tram

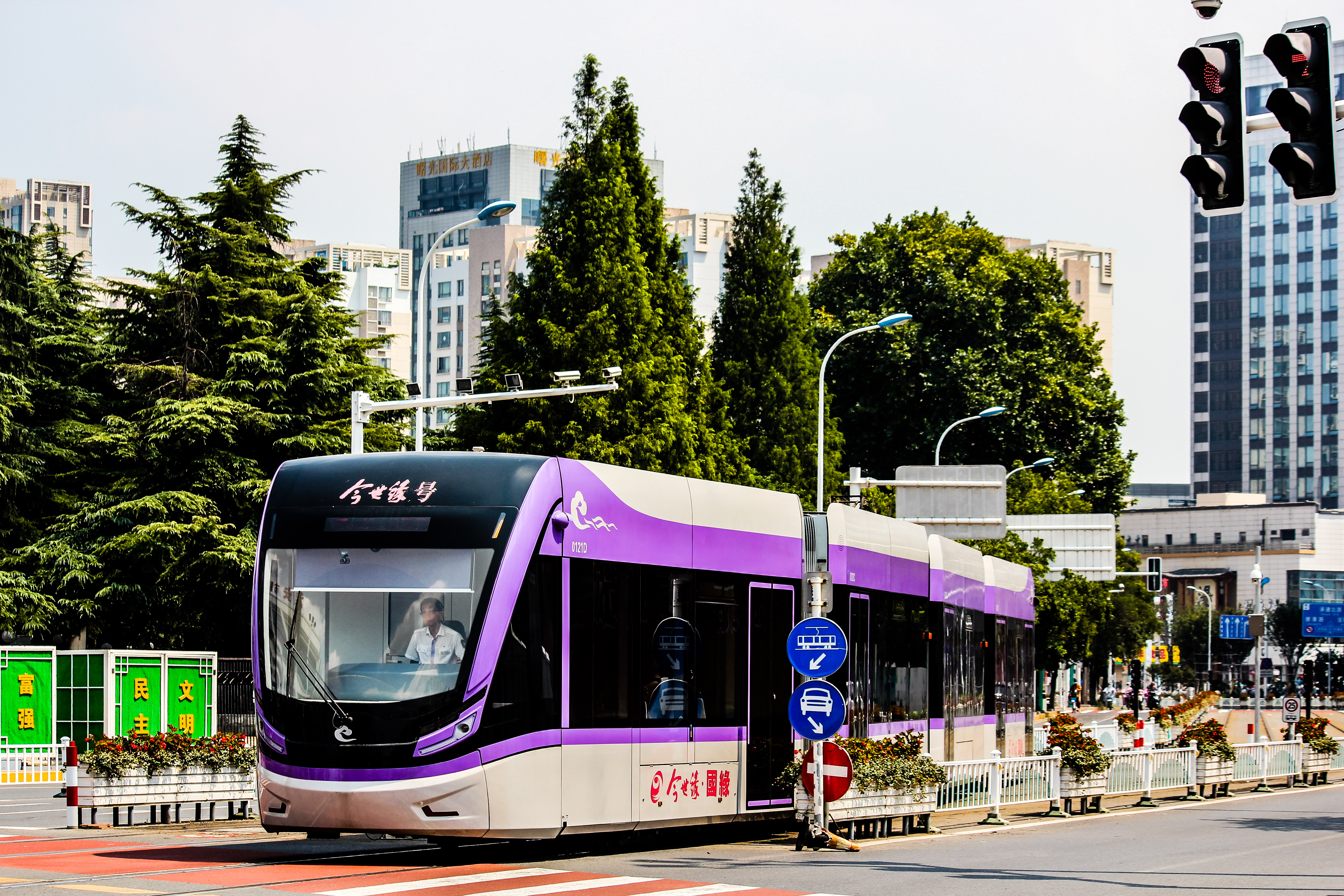
Huai'an Trams

Several cities in China had tram systems during the 20th century. However, by the end of the century, only Dalian and Changchun continued to operate.

- Beijing had the first tram system in China. It opened in 1899 and connected Ma-chai-pu Railway Station to the south gate of the city.

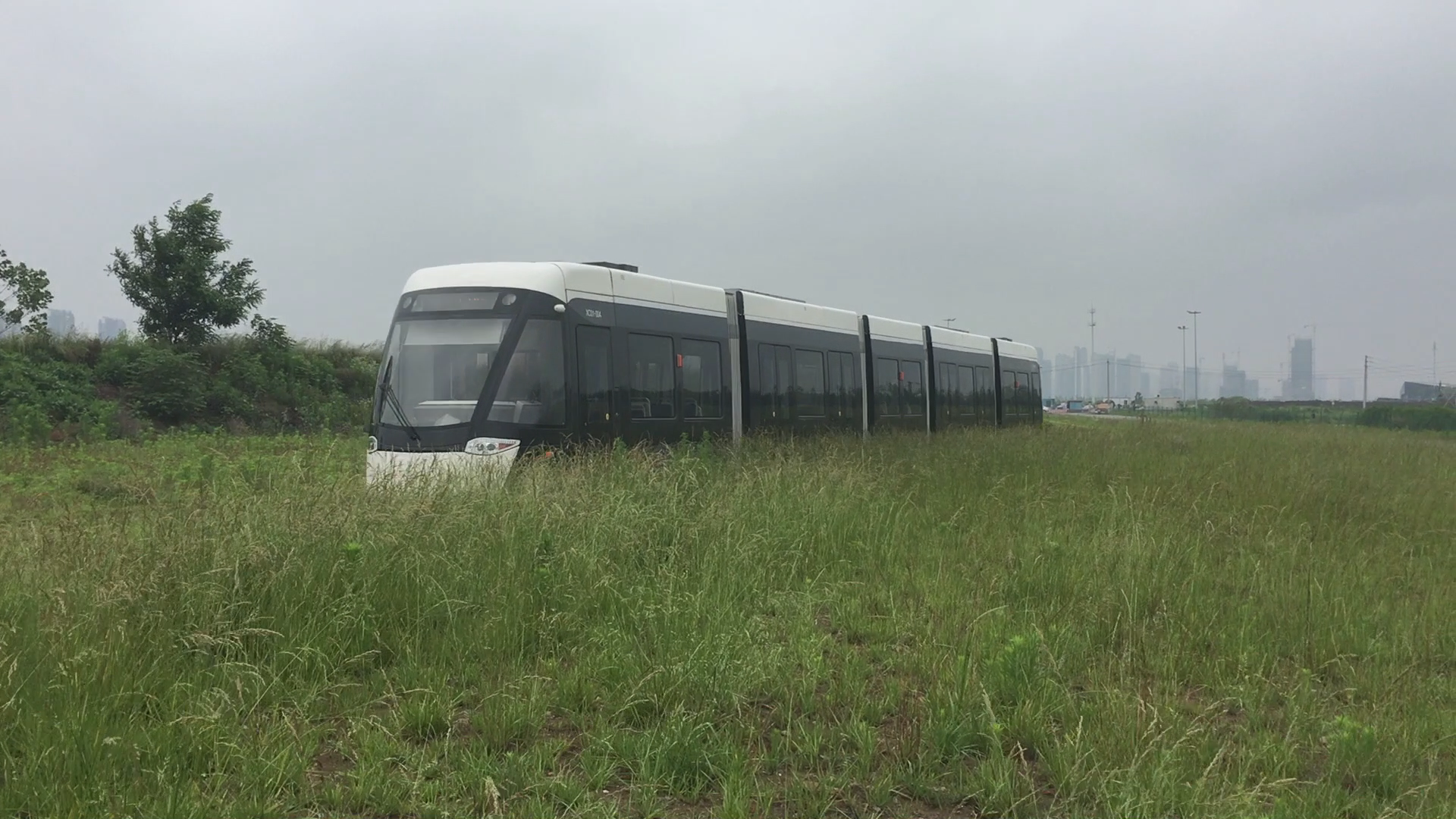
Bombardier Primove Tram traveling through Nanjing grassy field

- Fushun city in Liaoning province had a tram system circa 1902, operated by the Manchuria Railway Company with 26 trams.
- Tianjin city had a tram system that opened in 1906. By 1933 it had 9 miles of track and operated 116 tramcars. It was closed by 1972.
- In Shanghai there were three tram systems – two operated by the colonial powers of Britain and France and one by a Chinese company. The British system opened in 1908 and was the largest of the three. It had 7 lines and ran 216 tramcars. The French system opened the same year and its 3 lines ran 60 tramcars. The Chinese system opened in 1913 and operated 52 tramcars over 4 lines of some 23.5 km in length.
- In Shenyang city, the largest city of Liaoning province, a Japanese owned electric tramway opened in 1925 and replaced an earlier horse-drawn tram system that dated from around 1907.

By 1937 it had expanded to cover 12 km of track and ran 21 tramcars. It was finally closed in 1973.

- Harbin city in Heilongjiang province had a system from 1927 with 8 lines and about 40 trams. The system closed in 1987.
- The city of Anshan, in Liaoning, had a single tram line from 1956 till the late 1990s and the track was dug up in 2006.
- The Changchun tramway system started operations in 1942. By the 1950s the system covered 28 km with 98 cars. The system continues to operate today with two lines.
- Dalian city in Liaoning opened its first tram line on 25 September 1909. It was operated by South Manchuria Railway. By 1945, the system had 11 lines. Today 2 lines remain in operation covering 23.4 km. The system is in the process up being updated with a mixture of old tram cars and new modern low floor cars in operation.

However, in the 21st century, a number of tram systems started operating. Initially, Tianjin and Shanghai have introduced rubber tired trams for the TEDA Modern Guided Rail Tram and Zhangjiang Tram respectively. In 2011, Shenyang city decided to reintroduce the trams to complement its new metro network, then under construction. The first three lines of the new system were opened in the southern part of the city on 15 August 2013: Line 1 from New World International Convention & Exhibition Centre to Taoxian street, line 2 from Taoxian Airport to the Olympic Center and line 5 from the Olympic Center to Shenfu New Town. A fourth line is under construction. A year later, Nanjing opened the new Hexi trams just before the 2014 Youth Olympics. After that new tram systems opened in Qingdao, Guangzhou, Shenzhen, Suzhou, Zhuhai, Wuhan, and Huai'an. As of 2017, Beijing, Chengdu, Sanya, Wuyishan, Honghe and Haikou have new tram systems under construction. While Ningbo, Quanzhou, Zhengzhou, Baotou and Kunshan are planning tram networks for the future.

== Hong Kong ==
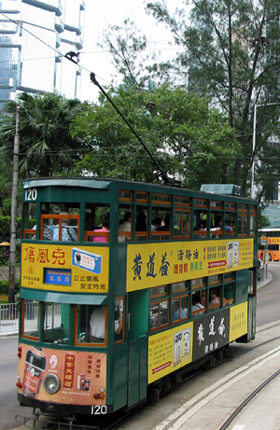
A Hong Kong Double-decker Tram. The tramway system was first introduced to the then Crown colony of Hong Kong in 1904 and is still in operation now.

The tramway system was introduced in the then British colony in 1904. The Hong Kong Tramway is a traditional British Isles-style double-decker tramway with street running, along the north shore of Hong Kong Island. Since the 1980s, the MTR Light Rail system has opened in the north west New Territories. Despite its name, the famous Peak Tram is actually a funicular railway.

== India ==
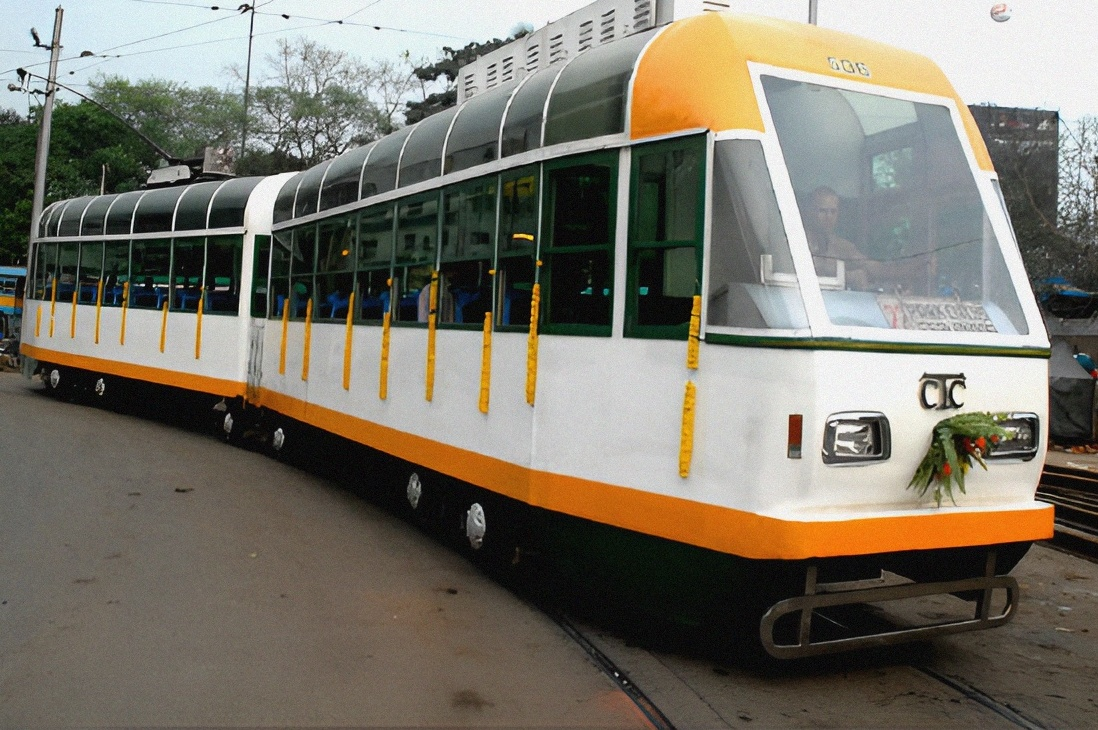
A new tram in Kolkata

In India, the city of Kolkata has the only operational tram network. The tram network in Kolkata is the oldest operating electric tram network in Asia, with the current network operating since 1900. Mumbai, Chennai, Nashik, Kanpur, Kochi, Delhi, Patna and Bhavnagar formerly had tram networks, but all of these were dismantled between the 1930s and 1960s.

== Indonesia ==
In Batavia (now Jakarta), the capital of the former Dutch colony of the Netherlands East Indies, a horse tram service started in 1869. A steam tram ran from 1881, and electrification followed in 1897. All Jakarta trams were discontinued in the 1960s by an independent Indonesia due to pressure from Sukarno, who saw the tram network as "antiquated" and a "relic of colonial era".

Other cities in Indonesia that used to have an urban tram network were Surabaya, East Java, and Semarang, Central Java.

The Semarang tram network was constructed between 1882 and 1883, and it was essentially the inner suburb extension of the Samarang–Joana Stoomtram Maatschappij (SJS) network, where they already had extensive rural tram network to the east of Semarang. Unfortunately, because of financial difficulties that hampered the SJS railway company, the Semarang tram network was closed down in 1940 (despite public protest in Semarang), and their rolling stocks were transferred to the Surabaya tram network.

The Surabaya tram network was first built in 1886. Initially consisting of steam trams, another network of electric trams was added in 1923. They served Surabaya commuters well into the independence era. The electric tram bowed out from service in 1968, while its steam counterpart outlived the electrics before bowing out from service in 1978, making it the very last urban steam tram service in the world to see service.

In 2012 there was talk of reviving Surabaya's tram network as a part of Surabaya Mass Rapid Transit project, which will see parts of the old electric tram right of way reactivated, and it will be combined with the future monorail network. The project is aimed to alleviate Surabaya's traffic congestion and provide cheap public transportation for Surabaya commuters. As in 2014 the project have entered tender phase.

In 2018, Gamplong Natural Studio was inaugurated in Sleman Regency, Special Region of Yogyakarta, and was built for movie purposes. There is a tram line inside the studio that is made complete with replicas and can be operated.

== Israel ==
The Jerusalem Light Rail system began operation in August 2011 with one 13-kilometre-long line, and is undergoing extension and expansion. The first line of the Tel Aviv Light Rail opened in August 2023, and two additional lines are under construction. A light rail system for Beersheba is also currently planned, as well as a tram-train that will connect between Haifa and Nazareth.

== Japan ==
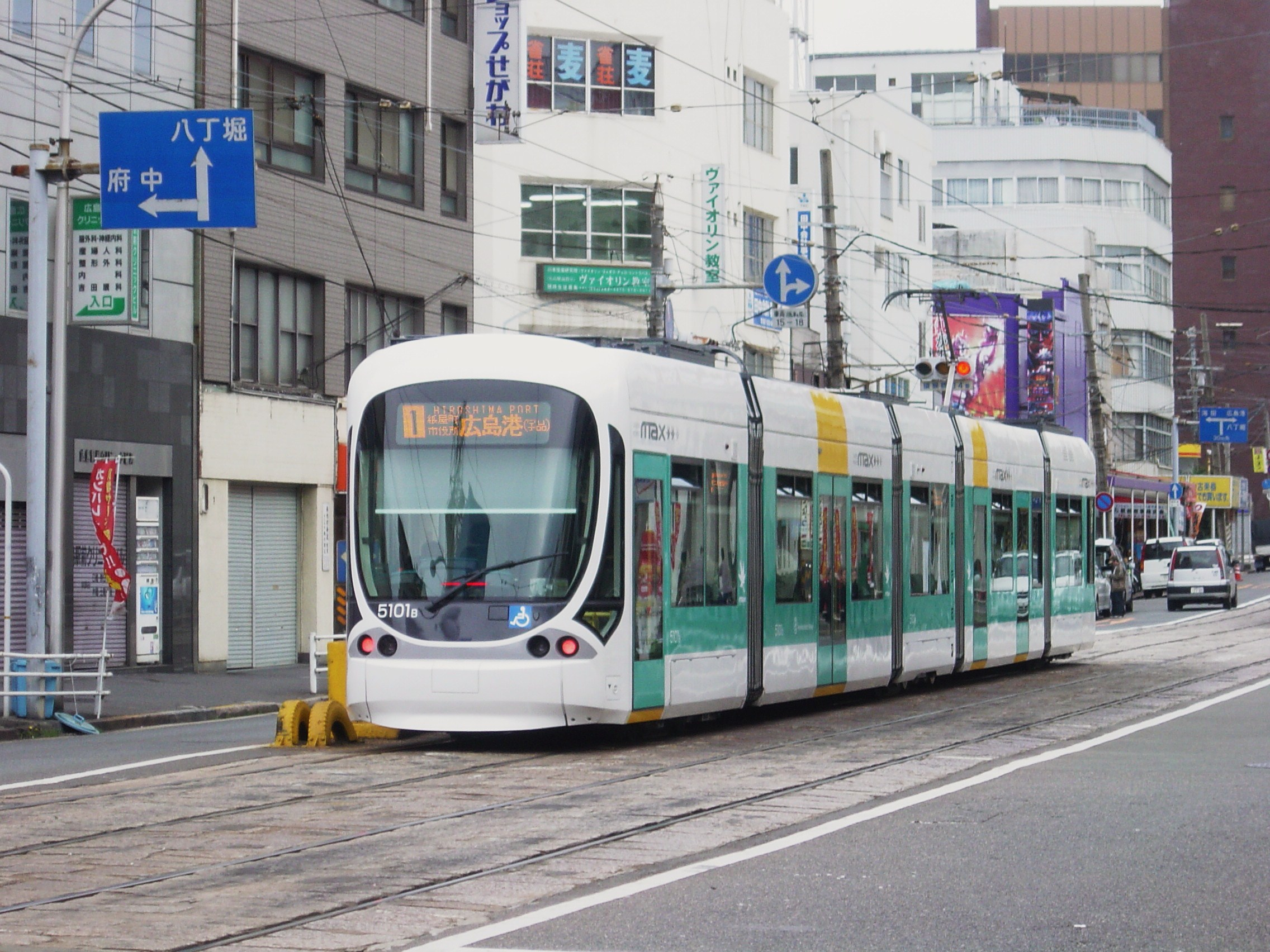
Green Mover Max, a Hiroden tram car in Hiroshima.

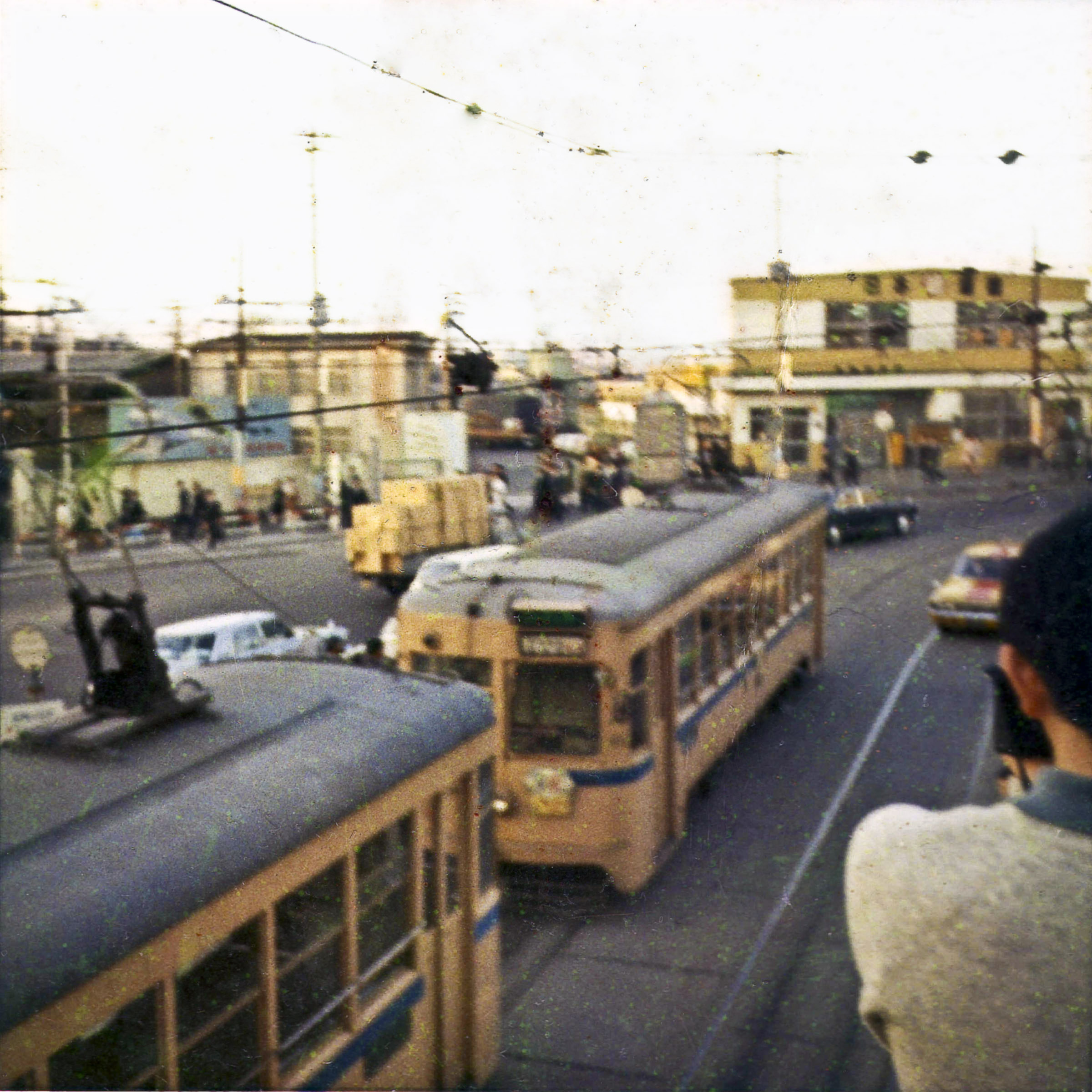
31 March 1972 was the last day of tram service in Yokohama.

The first tramway in Japan was the Kyoto electric railroad built in 1895. By 1932, there were 82 street railway companies in 65 cities, with 1,479 km of track. Similar to North America at the time many of these local tram networks had through service with interurban lines. Many Japanese cities had extensive tram systems until the 1960s, when increased motorization started to make some lines disappear. While others, particularly in the larger cities, were outright replaced by subway lines or converted the interurban routes to suburban railway lines. Tokyo, for instance, had 41 routes in 1962, while only two routes (Toden Arakawa Line and Tokyu Setagaya Line) still survive today. Kitakyushu was the most recent closure, being closed in 2000.

There are still many smaller cities that still have relatively well-kept networks. However, not many of them enjoy high ridership. Current tram systems include the Sapporo Street Car (Sapporo) and Hakodate City Tram (Hakodate) in Hokkaidō; Tokyo Toden and Tokyu Setagaya Line in (Tokyo), Enoden (Kamakura), Toyohashi Railroad (Toyohashi), Toyama Chihō Railway (Toyama), Man'yōsen (Takaoka), Randen (Kyoto), Hankai Tramway (Osaka), Okaden (Okayama), and Hiroden (Hiroshima) on Honshū; Iyotetsu (Matsuyama) and Tosaden (Kōchi) on Shikoku; and Nagasaki Electric Tramway (Nagasaki), Kumamoto City Tram (Kumamoto), and Kagoshima City Tram (Kagoshima) on Kyūshū. There are a few private railroad interurbans that have not been upgraded into full heavy railway standards.

Trams were formerly used in Sendai, Yokohama, Kobe, Fukuoka, and Nagoya, among others.

== North Korea ==
Pyongyang, the capital city of North Korea, has an extensive tram system that first opened in 1991. It is now 50 km in length, running mainly ČKD/Tatra vehicles with some other trams originally from Zürich. Another tram system is present in the city of Chongjin.

== South Korea ==
The South Korean capital Seoul had trams up until 1968. Some of their cars were acquired second-hand from the Los Angeles system. The trams were very useful in the Korean War, where half of the trams broke down. Trams were also formerly used in Busan until 1968. The Wirye Line in Seoul is a future tram line scheduled to open in 26 December 2026.

== Lebanon ==
Tram networks existed in Beirut under French rule. These networks were no longer functional after the Lebanese Civil War from 1975 to 1990.

== Malaysia ==
The sole tram service in present-day Malaysia operated in George Town, Penang, in British Malaya, between 1906 and 1936; its service was discontinued in favor of trolleybuses (which would in turn be replaced by conventional diesel buses). Owing to the relatively early retirement of streetcars in the city, few traces of streetcar infrastructure remain in George Town, with the exception of a stretch of paved-over streetcar railway rediscovered during roadworks in the late 2000s. Although talks on reviving the city's tram system have taken place since, none of these plans have materialized.

== Pakistan ==
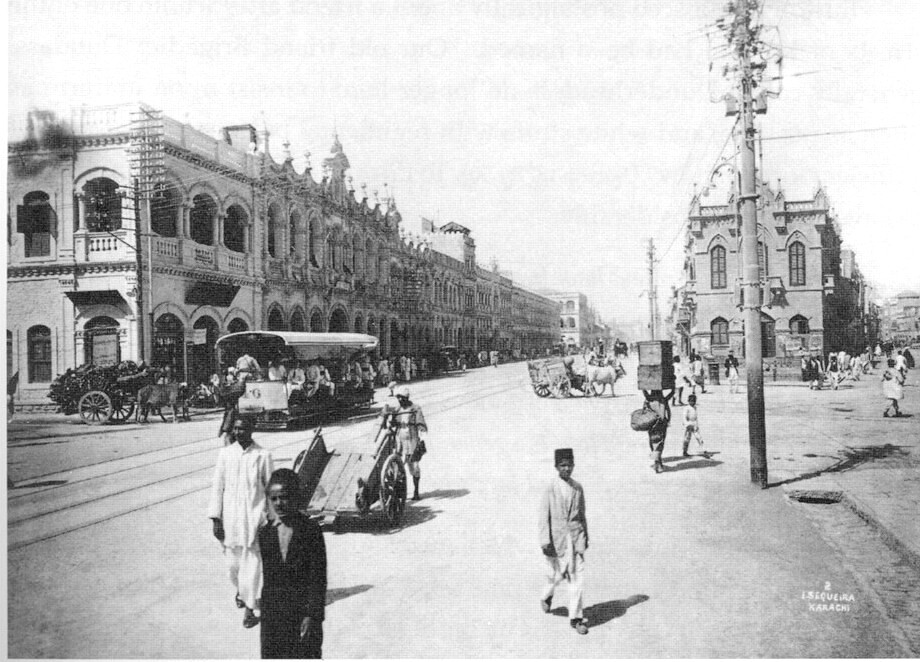
Street scene with tram in Karachi, ca. 1900.

In Pakistan, Karachi was the first and only city where trams were introduced by the British Raj in 1885. After almost 90 years, the network was closed in 1975 as trams were involved in many accidents and there was an attempt to decongest the city's traffic. Trams are under construction at DHA City, Karachi, which is going to be a planned city of 1 million people.

A 35-km tramway has been approved in the city of Lahore and construction was expected to start in February 2020.

== Philippines ==
The Philippines once had a tram network in the capital, Manila, which first started in the 1880s using horse-drawn streetcars owned by Spanish-Filipino businessman Jacobo Zóbel de Zangroniz through the Companía de Tranvias y Ferrocarriles de Manila. These streetcars are known as the tranvía. At the turn of the 20th century, horse-drawn tranvías of the Companía de los Tranvías de Filipinas were replaced by electric-powered streetcars as it changed ownership to the Manila Electric Railroad and Light Company, now known as the Meralco. The tranvía network ran throughout the city of Manila and its outskirts, Pasay, Makati, and Pasig. Much of the system was destroyed during the Battle of Manila in 1945.

The trams were superseded in the late 20th century by an urban rail network, beginning with the LRT Line 1 in the 1980s, followed by MRT Line 3 in the 1990s. Both lines use tram/light rail rolling stock, but these operate as fully grade-separated light rapid transit systems. Trams were also formerly used on the island of Corregidor.

== Singapore ==
Singapore has historically operated two tram services, the first a steam tramway existing between 1886 and 1894, and the second an electric-powered system between 1905 and 1927.

== Sri Lanka ==
The northern and central areas of the city of Colombo had an electric tram system. This system commenced operations around 1900 and was discontinued by 1960. The original operator was the Colombo Electric Tram Car and Lighting Company Ltd. (represented by Boustead Brothers), and after an infamous tram car Strike, the Colombo Municipal Council took over operations. Subsequently, the tram system was phased out.

== Taiwan ==
During the Japanese colonial period in Taiwan from the 1890s to 1945, the Japanese administration in Taiwan planned for extensive tramway networks across various Taiwanese metropolitan areas. However, none of these plans materialised.

The first serious attempt on light rail in contemporary Taiwan was the development of two demonstration light rail vehicles (LRVs) by the Taiwan Rolling Stock Company and the National Chung-Shan Institute of Science & Technology in 2001; the two LRVs were built to the 1067mm Cape gauge to be tested on Taiwan Railway Administration tracks. In 2004, Siemens built a demonstration track in Kaohsiung to evaluate the suitability of light rail in Kaohsiung and operated a Melbourne D-class tram there. However the first revenue-earning light rail line only came about with the start of construction of the Kaohsiung LRT Circular line in June 2013.; the first phase began trial operations in 2016 with a fleet of catenary-free low floor CAF Urbos LRVs. The Danhai LRT began operations in December 2018 with a fleet of locally-built light rail vehicles.

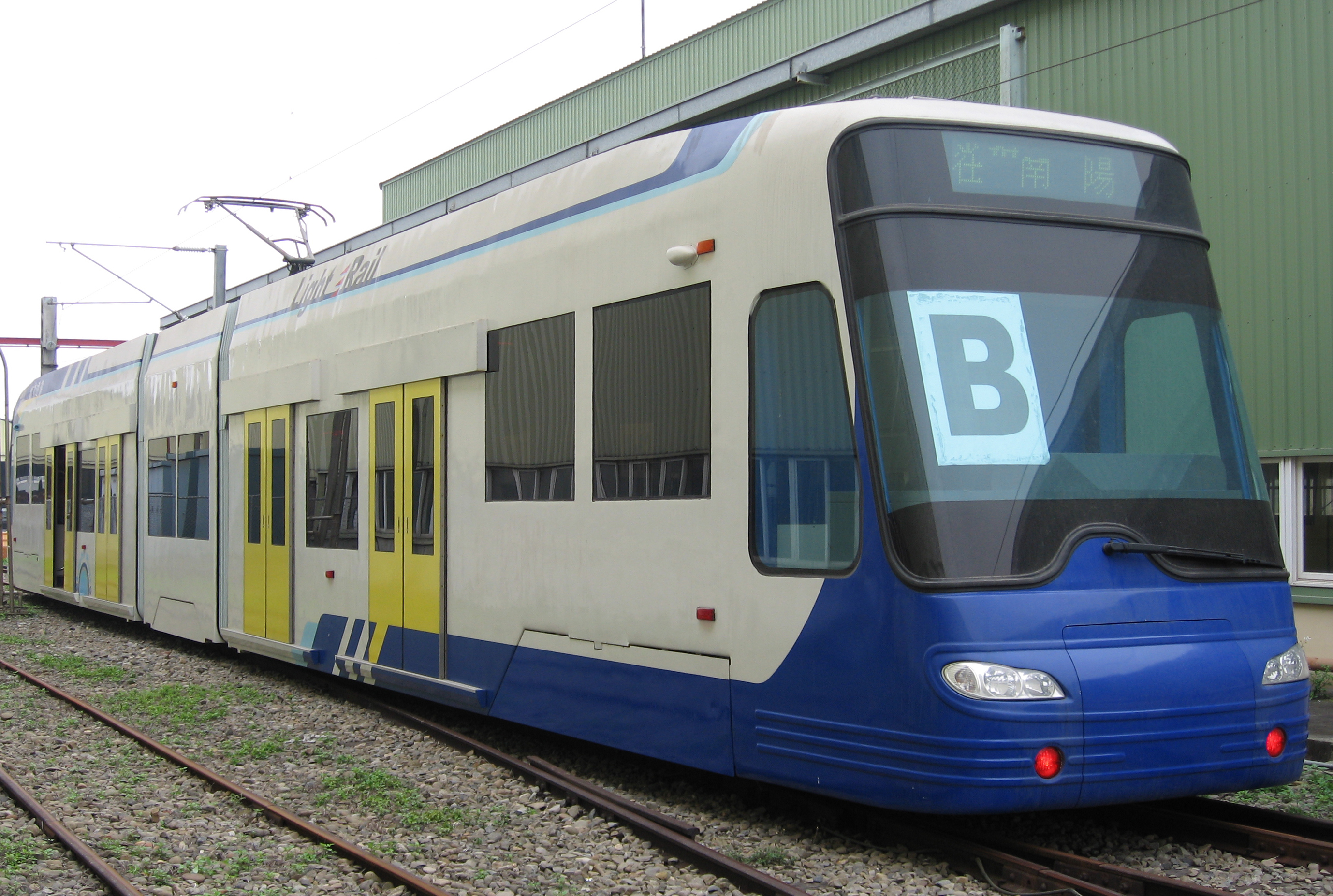
The demonstration LRV as built by the Taiwan Rolling Stock Company and the National Chung-Shan Institute of Science & Technology

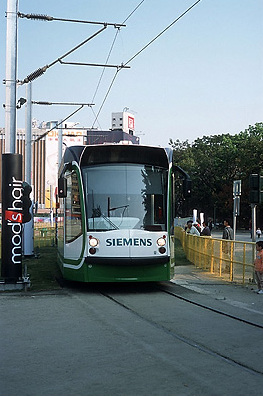
The demonstration Siemens Combino LRV as used in Kaohsiung in 2004

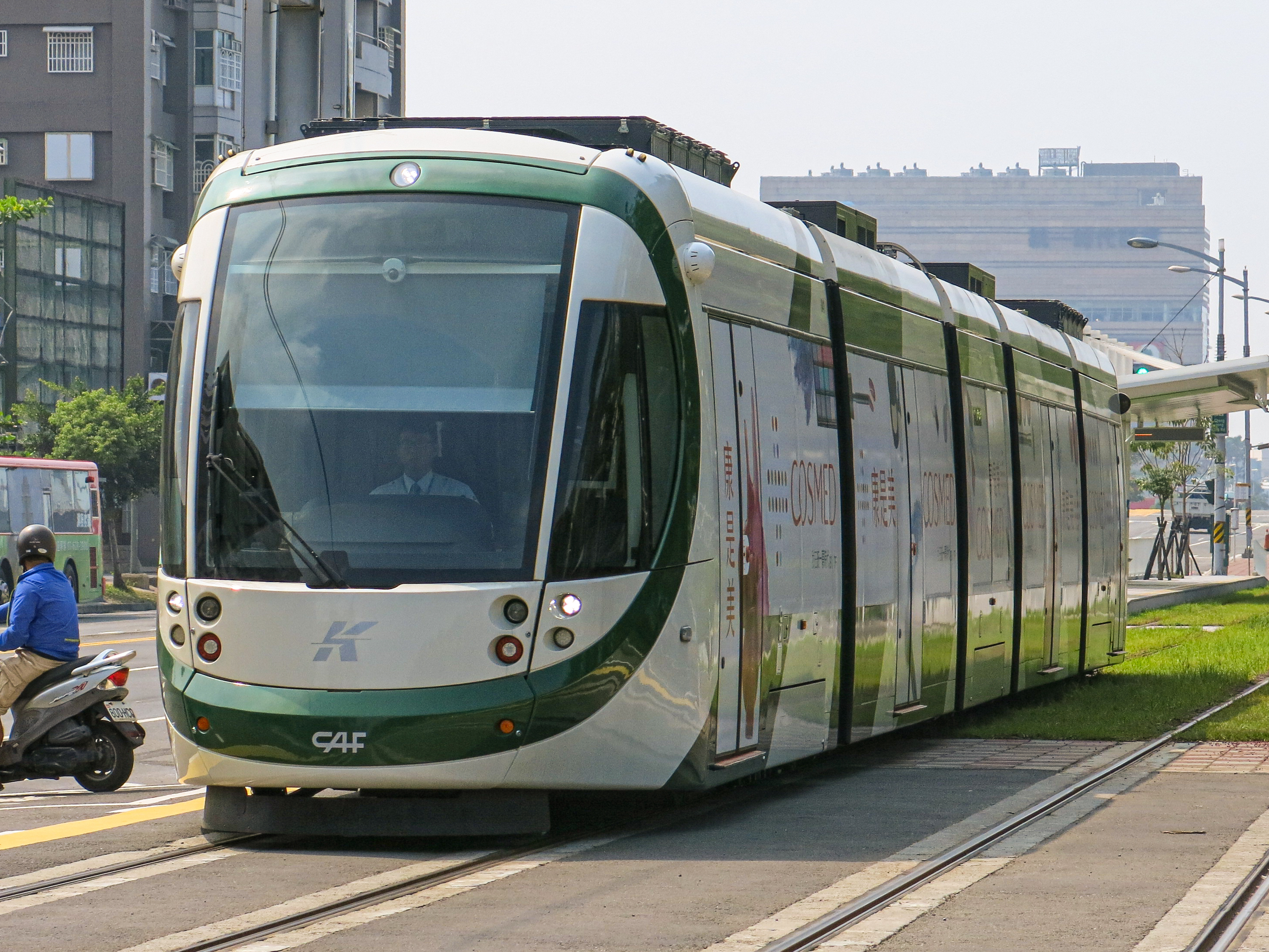
CAF Urbos as operated on Kaohsiung Circular Light Rail

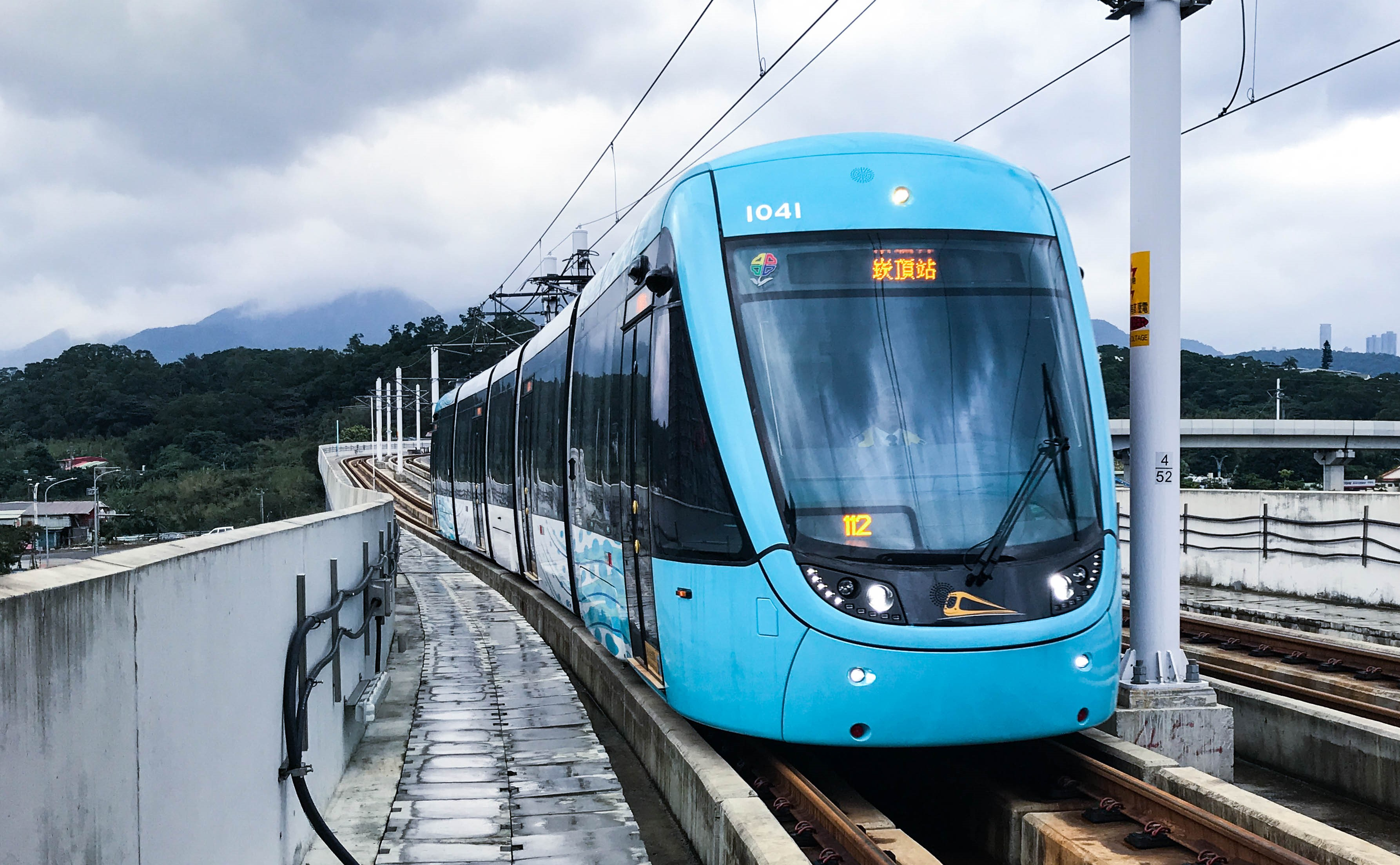
Danhai LRT train as built by the Taiwan Rolling Stock Company

== Thailand ==
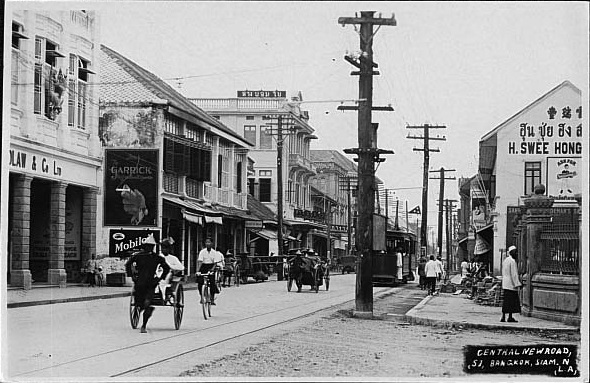
Charoen Krung Road c. 1910s - 1920s. A tram with its tracks is visible.

The Bangkok tramway system was a transport system in Bangkok. Its first-generation tram network first operated as a horse tram system in 1892, and was eventually converted to electric trams in 1893. It serviced Bangkok with 53.5 km of track and operated as 11 tram lines with 206 trams. The tramway service was discontinued in 1968.

The short-lived Lopburi tramway service was introduced in 1955 and closed down only 7 years later in 1962. It serviced Lopburi that was expanding rapidly into a military city at that time with 6.5 km of track. The tramway service was using disused rolling stocks from The Bangkok tramway system to run the service.

== United Arab Emirates ==
The Dubai Tram opened in 2014 and became the first tramway system in the world to use platform screen doors at its stations and the first tram system outside Europe to be powered by ground-based electric supply system.

== Uzbekistan ==
The Tashkent electrical tramway system was introduced in 1912 as a replacement of the horse-driven trams that were running since 1901. The Tashkent tram system is the oldest in Central Asia and was one of the biggest in the former Soviet Union. In the beginning of the 21st century, the system lost many of its routes due to removal of track from the city center. The last route closed in May 2016.

However, in 2017 a new tram system in Samarkand came into operation. All rolling stock (21 streetcars) were transferred from Tashkent.

== Vietnam ==
In Vietnam, tram networks once ran in Hanoi and Ho Chi Minh City (formerly Saigon).

=== Saigon ===
The Compagnie française des tramways de l’Indochine (CFTI) began tram services in Saigon in 1881, using cars towed by a steam locomotive designed by Deauville on a 0.5m gauge line. The system went bankrupt in 1896, but the system managed to survive using 14 new cars (trailers and locomotives) that CFTI ordered from Borsig, Germany, and expanded with two more lines in 1904 and 1913. Electric car service began in 1923 with new electric cars, and the line became 72 kilometres (45 mi) with two lines in service. Tram service ceased in 1953–1954, and the system was dismantled by 1957.

=== Hanoi ===
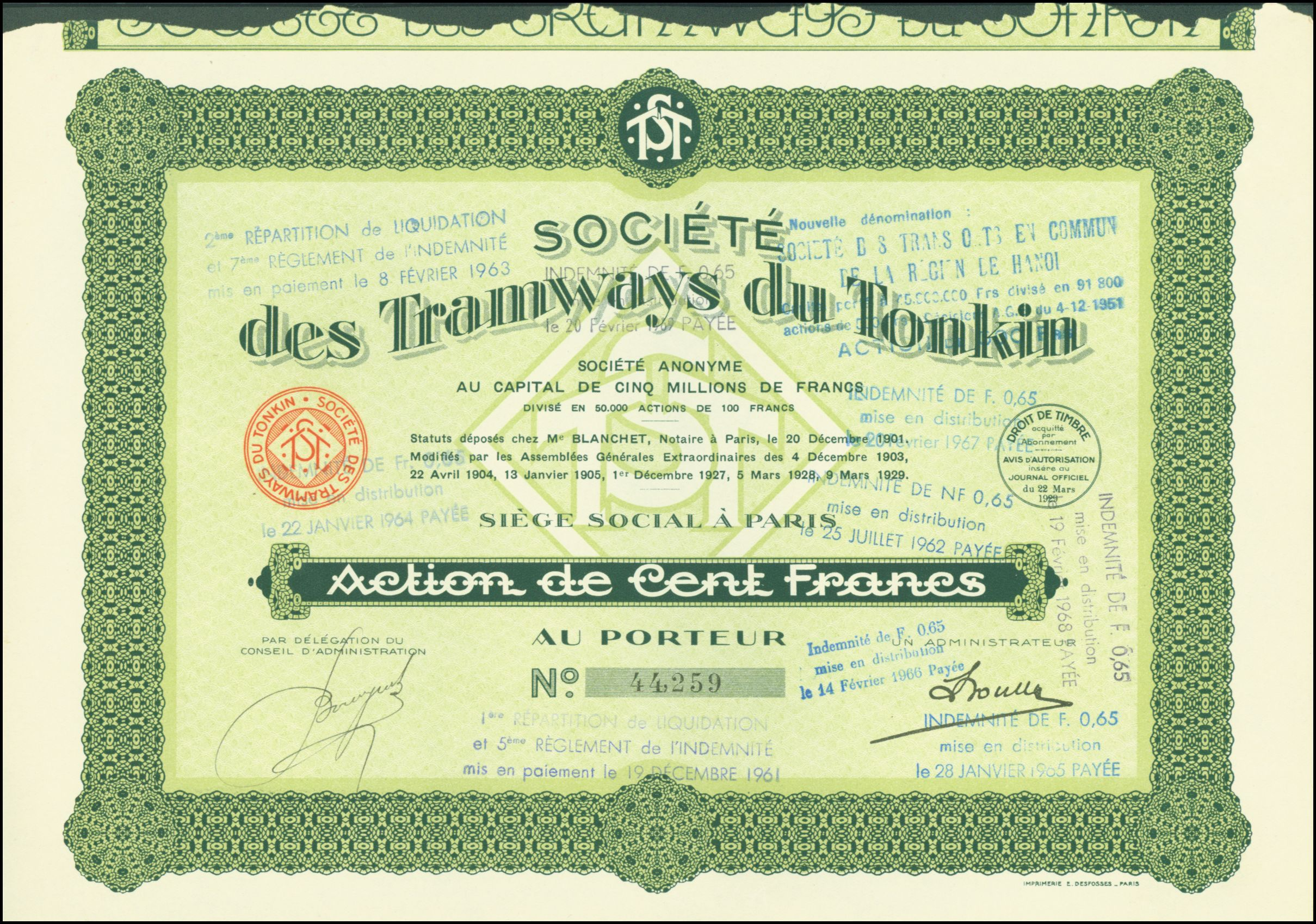
Share of the Société des Tramways du Tonkin, issued 22 March 1929

Hanoi's tram system, the Compagnie des tramways électriques d’Hanoï et extensions, began service in 1900 and was acquired by the Société des Tramways du Tonkin in 1929 (renamed Société des Transports en Commun de la Région de Hanoi in 1952). By 1943, the system had five lines and a spur line in 1968. The system's demise began with line closure in 1982 and survived until the last line closed in 1989, and continued as a trolleybus system until 1993. All tram cars were imported from France.

==== Hanoi tram lines ====
- Line 1 – Petit Lac (Hoàn Kiếm Lake)-Bạch Mai (1901–1982)
- Line 2 – Giấy (Bưởi Market) (1901–1989)
- Line 3 – Petit Lac-Pagode des Corbeaux-Thái Hà Ấp (1904–after 1982)
  - extended to Hà Đông 1914 and Cầu Đơ market 1938
- Line 4 – Place des Cocotiers-Pagode des Corbeaux-Pont du Papier (Cầu Giấy) (1907–1986)
  - became trolleybus line 1986–1993
- Line 5 – Mandarine-Kim Liên-Place Neyret-Yên Phụ (1930-after 1982)
  - extended to René Robin Hospital 1943

== See also ==
- List of town tramway systems in Asia
