= Hiroshima Electric Railway =

Japanese transportation company

Hiroshima Electric Railway Co., Ltd.
- Native name: 広島電鉄株式会社
- Romanized name: Hiroshima Dentetsu kabushiki gaisha
- Type: Public
- Traded as: TYO: 9033
- Industry: Transportation (streetcar, bus), real estate
- Founded: June 18, 1910; 116 years ago Incorporated April 10, 1942; 84 years ago
- Headquarters: 2-9-29 Higashisenda-machi, Naka-ku, Hiroshima 730-8610, Japan
- Owners: Hiroshima Hino Motors dealer (3.85%); Hiroshima Bank (3.44%); MUFG Bank (2.89%); Penta-Ocean (2.49% held in investment trust by Mizuho Trust & Banking); Idemitsu Kosan (1.60%)
- Number of employees: 1,377
- Website: www.hiroden.co.jp

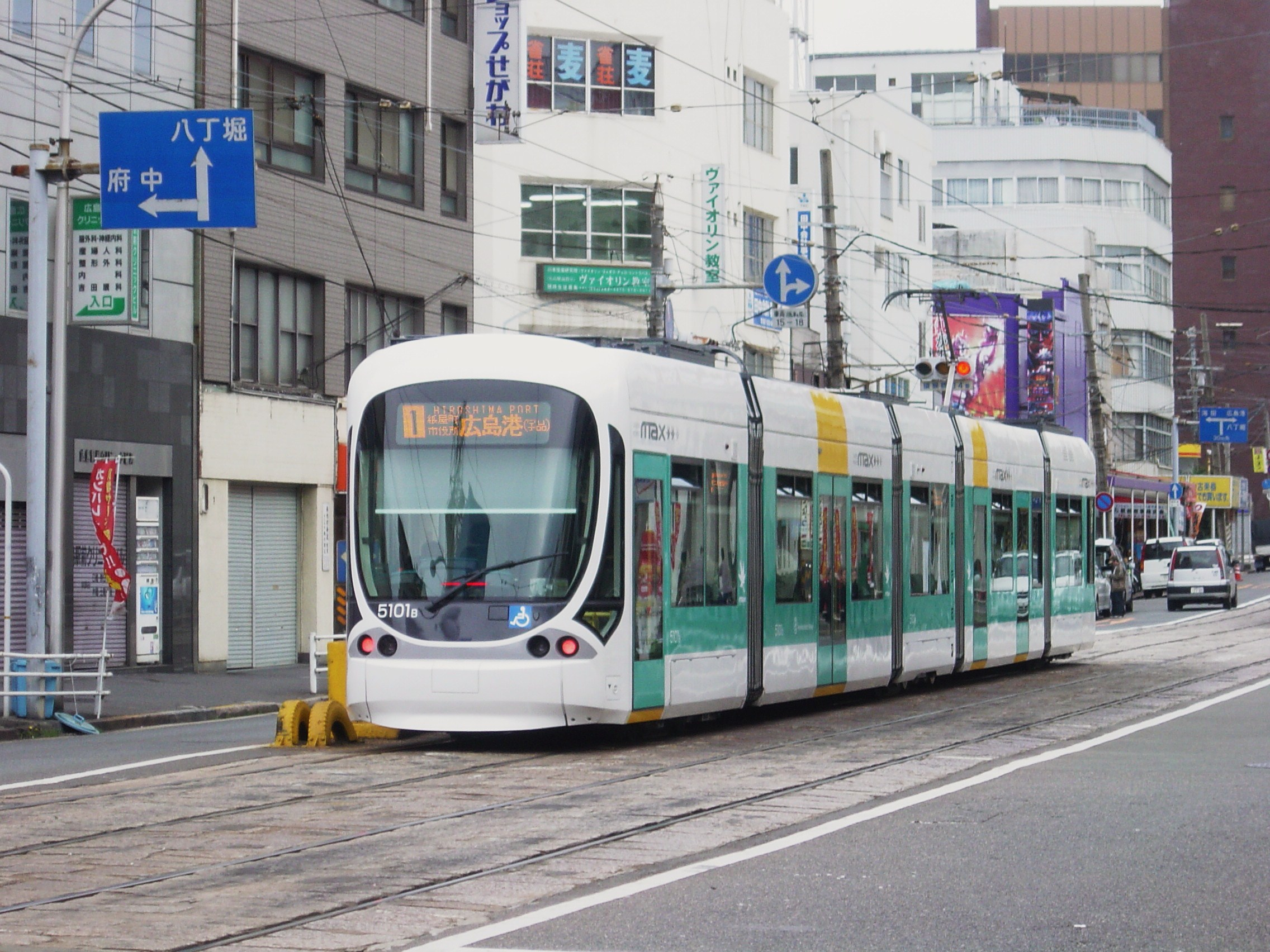
Green Mover Max

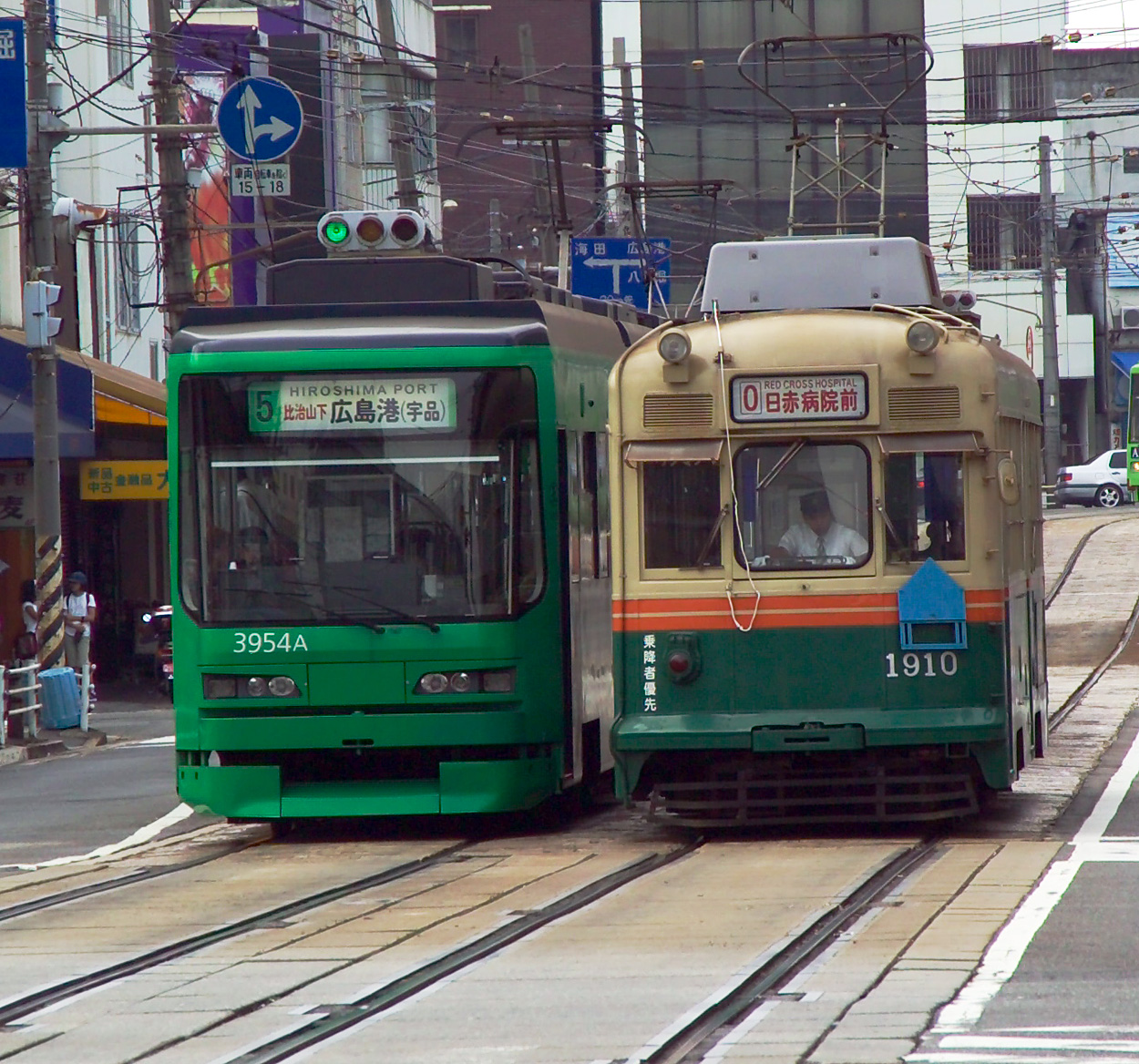
Regular and vintage Hiroden streetcars

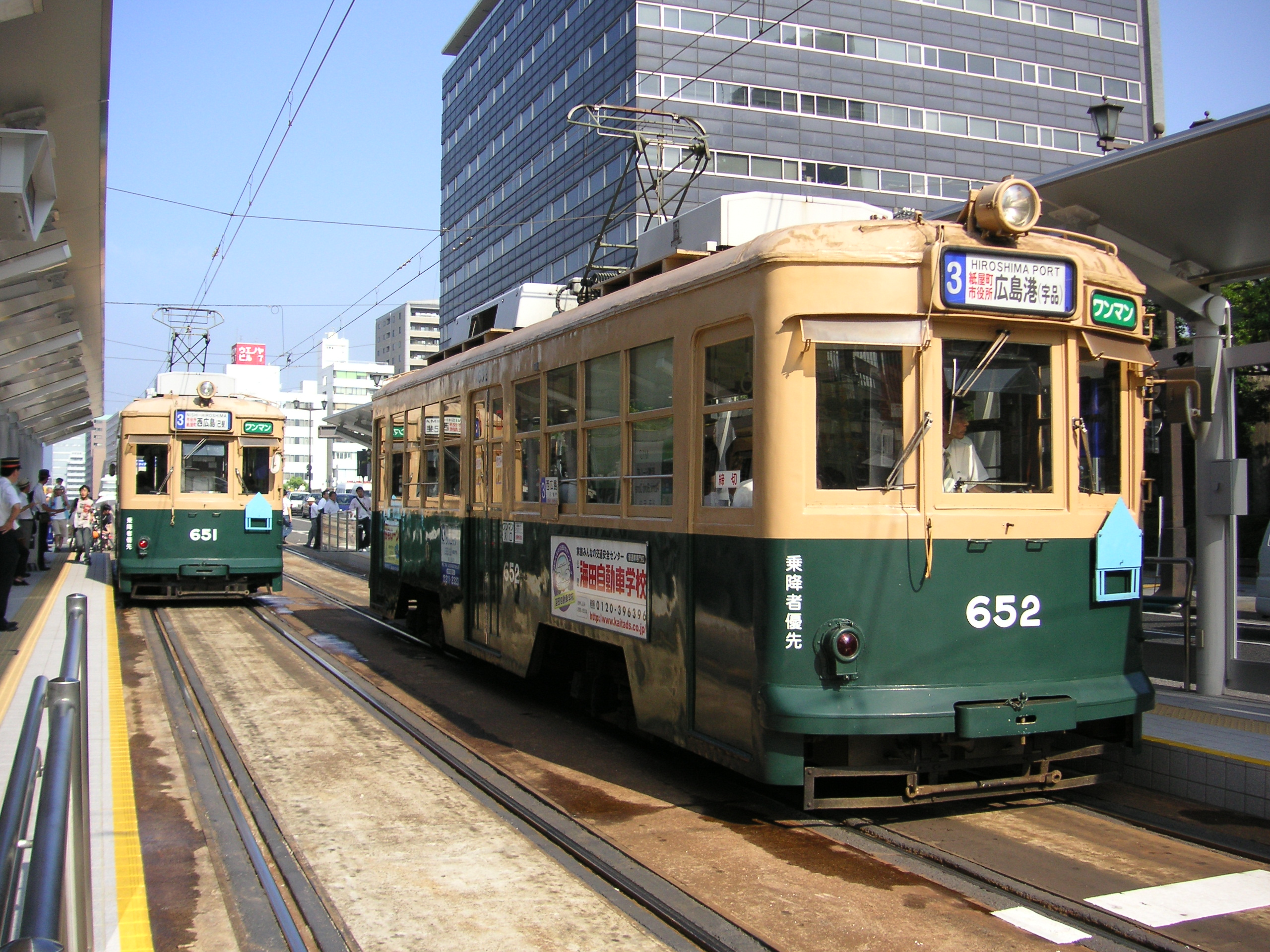
Hiroden cars 651 and 652, which both survived the atomic bomb. As of June 2025 both cars are still in service.

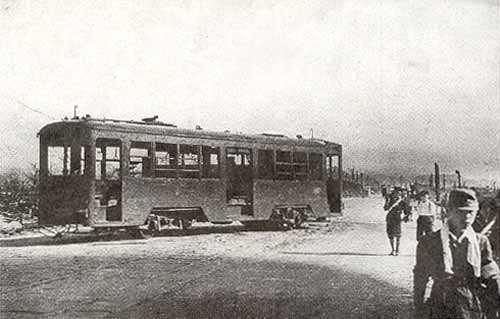
Damaged and derailed Hiroden 651 on August 9, 1945

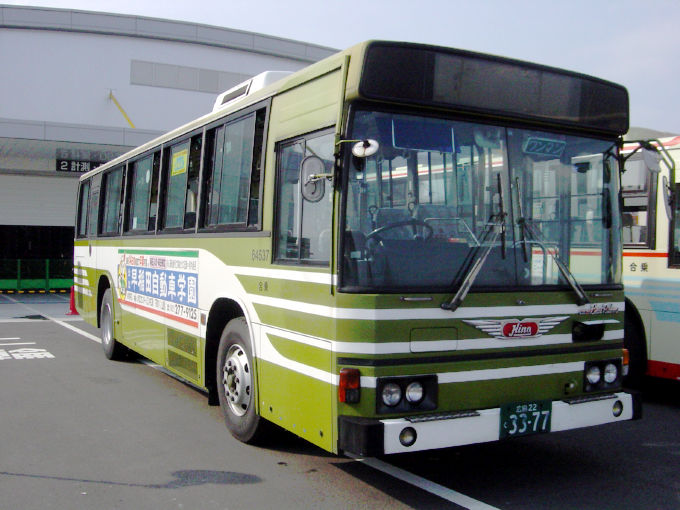
Hiroden bus

Hiroshima Electric Railway Co., Ltd. (Japanese: 広島電鉄株式会社, Hepburn: Hiroshima Dentetsu Kabushiki Gaisha) is a Japanese transportation company established on June 18, 1910, that operates streetcars and buses in and around Hiroshima Prefecture. The company is commonly known as Hiroden (広電). (Note: A contraction of the company's Japanese name, Hiroshima Dentetsu.)

The company's rolling stock includes an eclectic range of trams manufactured from across Japan and Europe, earning it the nickname "The Moving Streetcar Museum".

From January 2008 the company has accepted PASPY, a smart card ticket system. In the spring of 2025, PASPY was replaced by the new QR code based MOBIRY DAYS ticketing system.

This is the longest tram network in Japan, with 35.1 kilometres (21.8 mi).

The atomic bombing of Hiroshima by the United States took place on 6 August 1945. 185 employees of the company were killed as a result of the bomb and 108 of its 123 cars were damaged or destroyed. Within three days, the system started running again. Three trams that survived or were rebuilt after the bombing continue to run 75 years afterwards.

== Railway and streetcar ==
- One Railway line with one route for 16.1 km. (Miyajima Line)
  - between Hiroden-nishi-hiroshima Station and Hiroden-miyajima-guchi Station.
  - trains(trams) link up with other lines from Nishi-Hiroshima.
- Six Streetcar inner-city lines with eight routes for 19.0 km.
- Operates 271 streetcars.
- The company has the longest and busiest streetcar service in Japan.

=== Key terminal stations ===
- Hiroshima Station (connect to JR Hiroshima Station)
- Yokogawa Station (connect to JR Yokogawa Station)
- Hiroshima Port Station (connect with ferries and hydrofoils for Matsuyama, Imabari, Kure, Miyajima, Etajima and some other islands in Seto Inland Sea)
- Hondori Station (connect to Astram Line Hondori Station)
- Hakushima Station
- Eba Station
- Hiroden-nishi-hiroshima Station (connect to JR Nishi-Hiroshima Station)
- Hiroden-miyajima-guchi Station (connect to JR Miyajimaguchi Station and JR Miyajima Ferry and Miyajima Matsudai Kisen ferries for Miyajima)

=== List of lines and routes ===
- Hiroden lines and routes

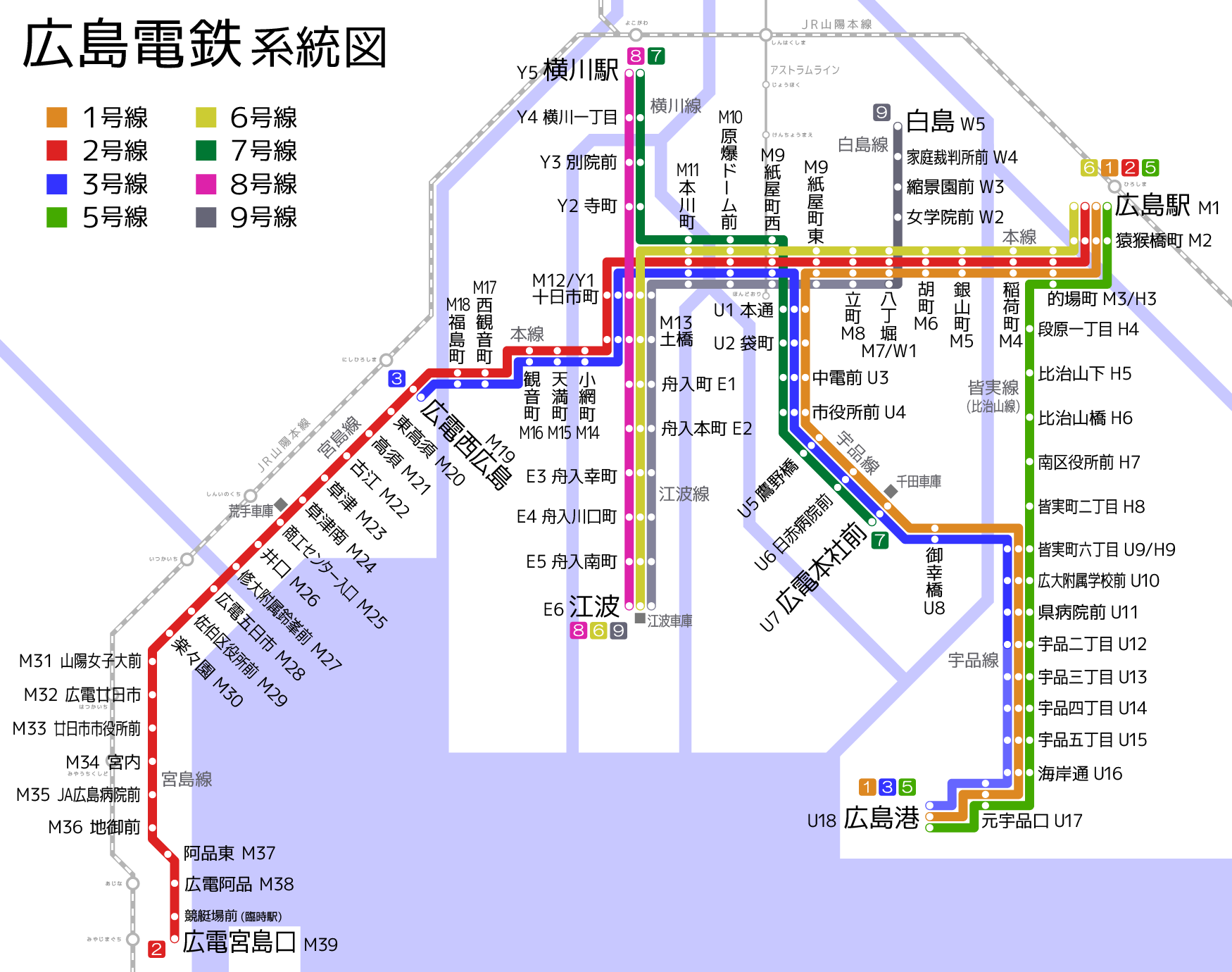
Hiroden route map

== Bus services ==
City area

- No.2: The prefecture office of Hiroshima - Hiroshima Station - Fuchū
- No.3: Hiroshima Station - Hacchōbori - Kamiyachō - Hiroshima City Hall - Kan'on
- No.4: Prefecture office - Hiroshima Station - Niho/Mukainada
- No.5: Ushita - Hiroshima Station - Hiroshima University Hospital
- No.6: Ushita - Hatchōbori - Kamiyachō - City Hall - Funairi - Eba
- No.7: (Yokogawa Station - Tokaichi-machi - ) Kamiyachō - City Hall - University Hospital - Niho/Mukainada
  - The bus runs only in morning between Yokogawa - Kamiyacho
- No.8: Yokogawa - Kan'on
- No.10: Nishi-Hiroshima Station - City Hall - University Hospital
- No.12: Hesaka - Hacchōbori - Miyuki-Bashi - Niho/ - Asahimachi/ - Hondōri - Miyuki-Bashi - Niho (Express)
  - The route for Asahimachi and Express bus only runs in rush time.
- No.13: Hiroshima Station - Inari-machi - Chuden-mae - City Hall

Suburb area

28 Bus routes for the suburbs. Most suburban lines departs from Hiroshima Bus Center

- North: For Asaminami and Asakita ward, and Yoshida, Toyohira, Sandan-kyō(via Chūgoku Expressway or Route 191) and Miyoshi(via Chūgoku Expressway)
  - For Asa zoo and Asahigaoka, the bus departs from Hiroshima Station and not via Bus Center.
- West: For Koi, West ward, Saeki ward, Hatsukaichi
  - Some buses start from Hiroshima Station or Hacchōbori.
- 1 through Bus route to Kure(Clare Line)
- 6 Superhighway bus routes around Chūgoku region and Tokyo.
  - routes between Masuda, Hamada, Matsue, Yonago, Tottori and Tokyo.
- Hiroshima Airport Limousine bus.
- Operate 489 Buses.

=== Main bus stations ===
- Hiroshima Bus Center, the main terminal bus station in central Hiroshima

== See also ==
- Green Mover Max
- List of tram and light rail transit systems
