= Naka-ku, Hiroshima =

Ward of Hiroshima, Japan

Naka-ku 中区
- Ward
- Naka Ward Office

- Flag Seal

- Location of Naka-ku in Hiroshima City

- Location within Japan
- Coordinates: 34°23′10″N 132°27′19″E
- Country: Japan
- Region: Chūgoku (Sanyo)
- Prefecture: Hiroshima
- City: Hiroshima
- Established: April 1, 1980

Area
  - Total: 15.32 km^{2} (5.92 sq mi)

Population (August 1, 2026)
  - Total: 143,560
  - Density: 9,371/km^{2} (24,270/sq mi)
- Time zone: UTC+9 (Japan Standard Time)
- Postal: 730-8587
- Higashi Ward Office's Address: 1-4-21 Kokutaiji-machi, Naka-ku, Hiroshima City, Hiroshima Prefecture (広島県広島市中区国泰寺町一丁目4番21号)
- Website: Official site

Naka-ku (中区; lit. "middle district") is the heart of Hiroshima, Hiroshima Prefecture, Japan. Naka-ku is home to Hiroshima's central business district and Peace Memorial Park. Major attractions include the Hondori shopping arcade, a covered mall-like street of shops extending east from the Hiroshima Peace Memorial Park to Hatchobori. Also in Naka-ku is Okonomi-mura - a building housing a number of restaurants that serve Hiroshima's famous food, okonomiyaki.

== Geography ==
This place is in the middle of River delta of Ōta River. It's almost flat except around Mt. Eba or Mt.Eba-sarayama.

=== Nature ===
- Ōta River

=== Neighbors ===
- North:East Ward
- South:Hiroshima Bay
- East:South Ward
- West:West Ward

== Economy ==
Air China has an office on the 11th floor of the NBF Hiroshima Tatemachi Building in Naka-ku. Asiana Airlines operates a sales office on the ninth floor of the Hiroshima Crystal Plaza Building in Naka-ku.
