= Hiroden lines and routes =

This is a list of lines and routes on the Hiroshima Electric Railway's railway and streetcar (tram) systems in and around Hiroshima, Japan.

== Lines ==
Hiroden system map

Currently there are eight streetcar lines used by nine different routes:

| Line | Length | Used by routes | | | | | | | | | Stops |
|---|---|---|---|---|---|---|---|---|---|---|---|
| Main Line | 5.2 km (3.2 mi) | 1 | 2 | 3 | 5 | 6 | 7 | 8 | 9 | L | 17 |
| Ujina Line | 5.9 km (3.7 mi) | 1 | | 3 | 5 | | 7 | | | L | 19 |
| Eba Line | 2.6 km (1.6 mi) | | | | | 6 | | 8 | 9 | | 7 |
| Yokogawa Line | 1.4 km (0.87 mi) | | | | | | 7 | 8 | | | 5 |
| Minami Line | 2.2 km (1.4 mi) | | | | 5 | | | | | L | 7 |
| Hakushima Line | 1.2 km (0.75 mi) | | | | | | | | 9 | | 5 |
| Circular Line | 1.2 km (0.75 mi) | | | | | | | | | L | 4 |
| Miyajima Line | 16.1 km (10.0 mi) | | 2 | | | | | | | | 22 |

== Routes ==
There are eight regularly scheduled streetcar routes running on the lines shown above. These routes are usually identified by numbers.

Route 0 services runs during the rush hour along the Ujina Line with short turns at Hiroden Honsha-Mae, or Niseseki-Byoin-Mae. Other service on route 0 includes private charters, special events, and all streetcars that are out of service and returning to Hiroden Honsha-Mae.

Starting August 3, 2025, with the opening of the new Ekimae Ohashi Line, two outbound trips on Route 1 on weekday mornings at 07:32 and 07:51 operate as Rapid services, omitting 3 stops and reducing travel times between Hiroshima Port of Hiroshima Station by approximately one minute.

During mid-day, route 7 service turns back at Hiroden Honsha-Mae instead of running all the way to Hiroshima Port. Route 3 currently operates during the morning and afternoon rush hours only.

| Route | Operating sections | Stations | Frequency | Journey time |
|---|---|---|---|---|
| 1 | Hiroshima Station - Hiroshima Port | 27 | 12 mins | 44 mins |
| 2 | Hiroshima Station - Hiroden-miyajima-guchi | 40 | 10 mins | 66 mins |
| 3 | Hiroden-nishi-hiroshima - Hiroshima Port | 29 | 15 mins | 34 mins |
| 5 | Hiroshima Station - Hijiyama-shita - Hiroshima Port | 18 | 12 mins | 29 mins |
| 6 | Hiroshima Station - Eba | 20 | 15 mins | 34 mins |
| 7 | Yokogawa Station - Hiroshima Port | 15 | 12 mins | 48 mins |
| 8 | Yokogawa Station - Eba | 12 | 20 mins | 24 mins |
| 9 | Hatchobori - Hakushima | 5 | 18 mins | 8 mins |
| L | Hiroden-honsha-mae - Matobacho - Hiroden-honsha-mae | 21 | 25 mins | 44 mins |

== Ticketing system ==
=== Special tickets ===
Both two-day and one-day tickets are available.

- 2-day ticket for Hiroden streetcars, Miyajima Matsudai Kisen ferries to Miyajima, and ropeways for Mt. Misen
- 1-day ticket for Hiroden streetcars and ferries
- 1-day ticket for Hiroden streetcars
- 1-day passport for "no car day" on the 22nd of every month
- Paseo card - Prepaid card for Hiroden Streetcar, Astram Line and bus services around Hiroshima
- Transfer card: Used when transferring from one line or route to another

== See also ==
- List of railway lines in Japan
- List of light-rail transit systems
