= 稲荷町駅 =

稲荷町駅 may refer to:

- Inarichō Station
- Inarimachi Station (disambiguation)
  - Inari-machi Station (Hiroshima)
  - Inarimachi Station (Toyama)
