= Danbara 1-chome Station =

Railway station in Hiroshima, Japan

Coordinates: 34°23′25″N 132°28′27″E

Danbara 1-chome 段原一丁目
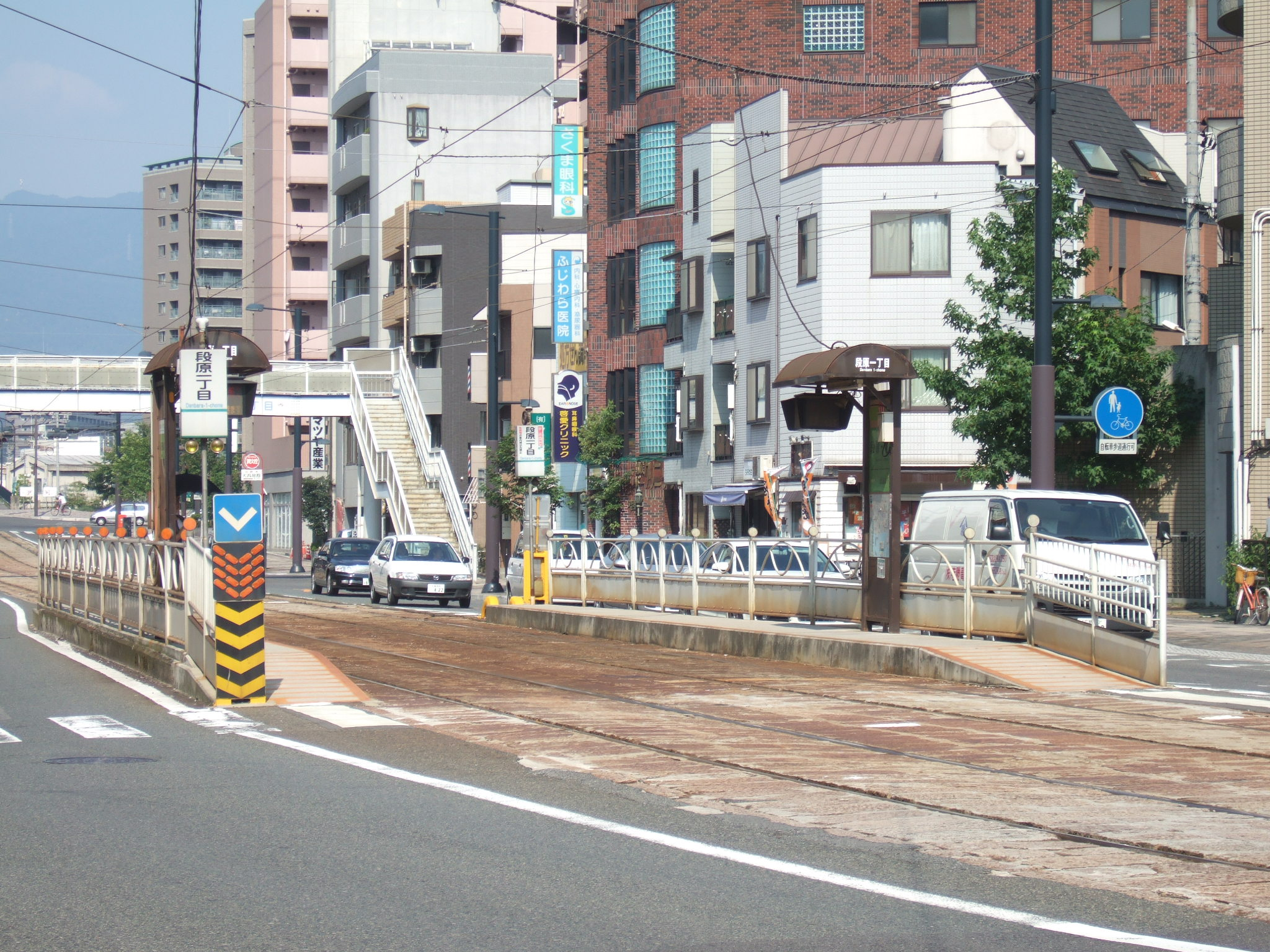

General information
- Location: Danbara 1-chome, Minami-ku, Hiroshima; Japan
- Operator: Hiroshima Electric Railway
- Line: Circular Route

Other information
- Station code: L02

History
- Opened: December 27, 1944
Location

Danbara 1-chome is a Hiroden station (tram stop) on Hiroden Hijiyama Line, located in Danbara 1-chome, Minami-ku, Hiroshima.

== Routes ==
- Loop Line

== Connections ==
█ Circular Route

Matoba-cho — Danbara 1-chome — Hijiyama-shita

== Around station ==
- Danbara Elementary School
- Matsukawa Park
- Hijiyama Shrine
- Hijiyama River
- Kyoubashi River
- Enko River

== History ==
- Opened as "Danbara-oohata-machi" on December 27, 1944.
- Renamed to "Danbara-ohata-machi" in 1995.
- Renamed to "Danbara 1-chome" on November 1, 2001.
- Operations suspended with the opening of the Ekimae Odori route of the Hiroden Main Line on 3 August 2025.

== See also ==
- Hiroden lines and routes
