= Kenbyoin-mae Station =

Railway station in Hiroshima, Japan

Coordinates: 34°22′07″N 132°27′53″E

Kenbyōin-mae 県病院前
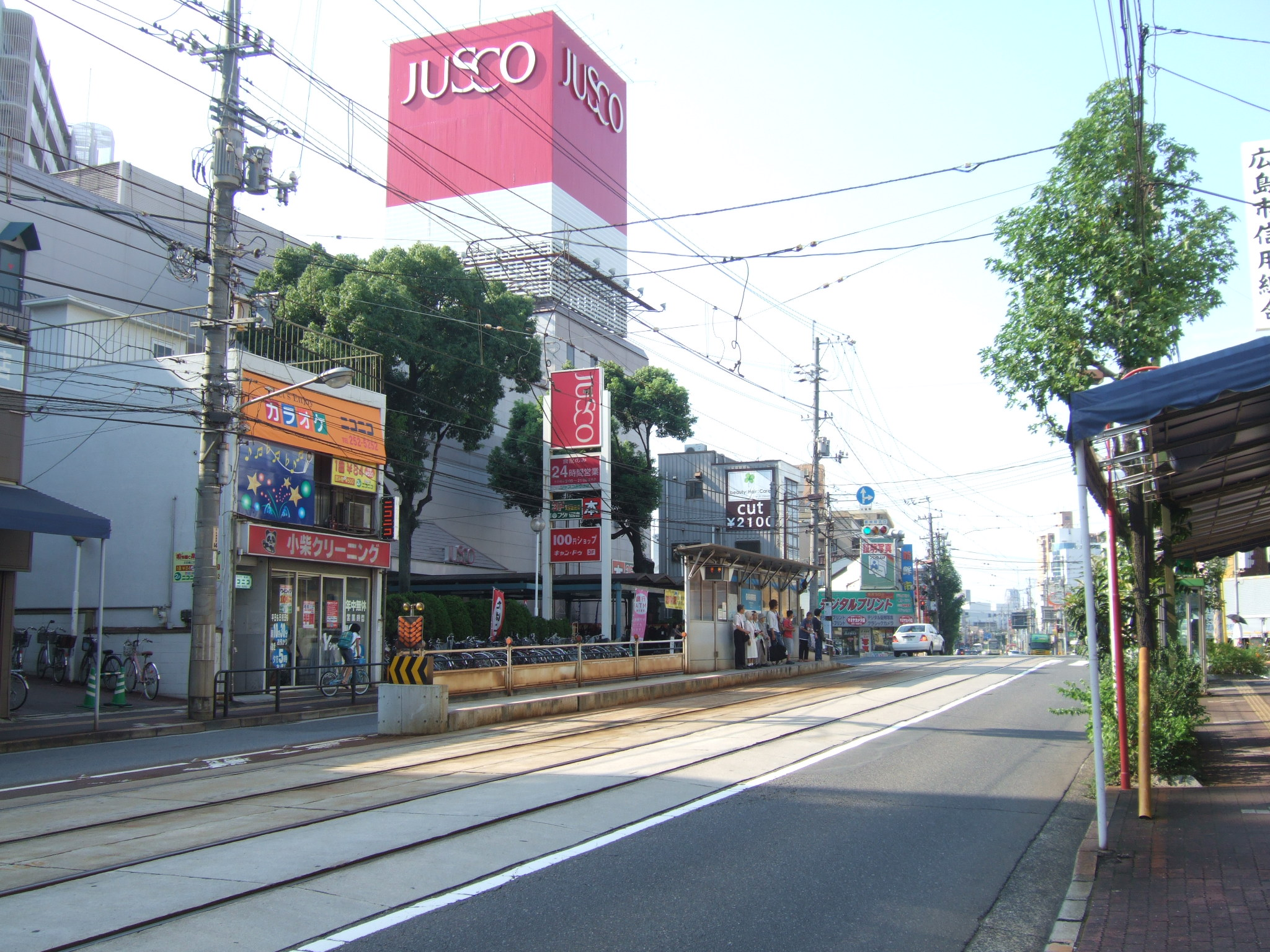

General information
- Location: Ujina-kanda 1-chōme & Ujina-miyuki 1-chōme, Minami-ku, Hiroshima; Japan
- Operator: Hiroshima Electric Railway
- Lines: █ Hiroden Ujina Line; Route

Other information
- Station code: U11

History
- Opened: December 27, 1935
Location

Kenbyōin-mae is a Hiroden station (tram stop) on Hiroden Ujina Line, located in Minami-ku, Hiroshima.

== Routes ==
From Kenbyōin-mae Station, there are three of Hiroden Streetcar routes.

- Hiroshima Station - Hiroshima Port Route
- Hiroden-nishi-hiroshima - Hiroshima Port Route
- Hiroshima Station - (via Hijiyama-shita) - Hiroshima Port Route

== Connections ==
█ Ujina Line

Hirodaifuzokugakkō-mae — Kenbyōin-mae — Ujina 2-chōme

== Around station ==
- Hiroshima Prefectural Hospital
- Prefectural University of Hiroshima
- Ujina Post Office
- JUSCO Miyuki

== History ==
- Opened as "Koryo-chugaku-mae" on November 27, 1935.
- Renamed to the present name "Kenbyoin-mae" in 1948.

== See also ==
- Hiroden lines and routes
- List of railway stations in Japan
