= Ebisuchō Station =

Ebisuchō Station is the name of two train stations in Japan:

- Ebisuchō Station (Osaka) (恵美須町駅)
- Ebisu-cho Station (Hiroshima) (胡町駅)
