= Minami-kuyakusho-mae Station =

Hiroden station in Japan

Coordinates: 34.3801°N 132.4669°E

Minami-kuyakusho-mae 南区役所前
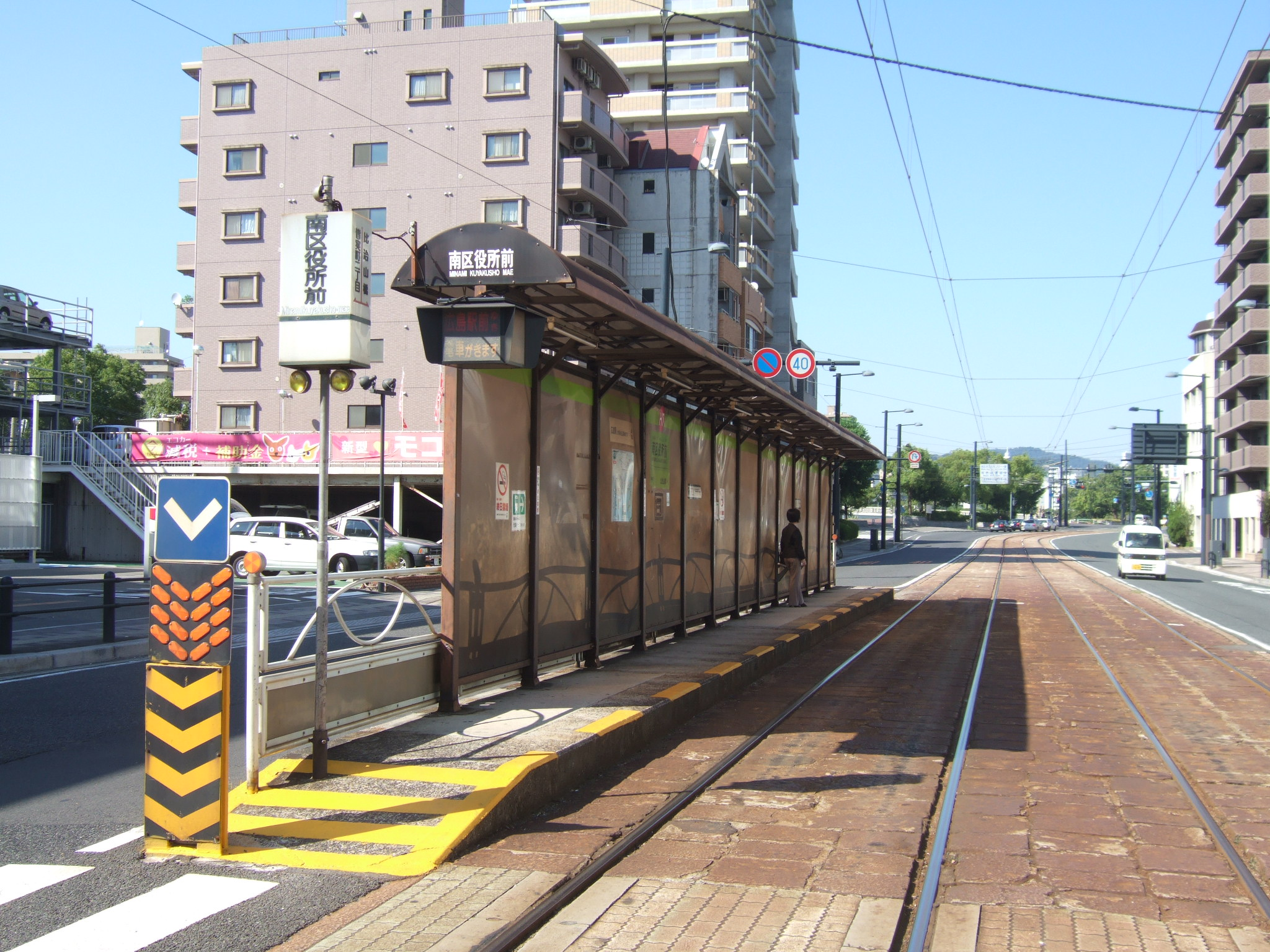

General information
- Location: Hijiyama-honmachi, Minami-ku, Hiroshima; Japan
- Operator: Hiroshima Electric Railway
- Lines: █ Hiroden Hijiyama Line; Route

Other information
- Station code: H7

History
- Opened: March 1, 1982
Location

Minami-kuyakusho-mae is a Hiroden station (tram stop) on Hiroden Hijiyama Line, located in front of Hiroshima Minami Ward Office, in Hijiyama-honmachi, Minami-ku, Hiroshima.

== Routes ==
From Minami-kuyakusho-mae Station, there are one of Hiroden Streetcar routes.

- Hiroshima Station - (via Hijiyama-shita) - Hiroshima Port Route

== Connections ==
█ Hijiyama Line

Hijiyama-bashi — Minami-kuyakusho-mae — Minami-machi 2-chome

== Around station ==
- Hiroshima Minami Ward Office
- Hiroshima FM

== History ==
- Opened on March 1, 1982

== See also ==
- Hiroden lines and routes
