= Minami-machi 2-chome Station =

Tram stop in Hiroshima, Japan

Minami-machi 2-chome 皆実町二丁目

General information
- Location: Minami-ku, Hiroshima; Japan
- Coordinates: 34°22′40″N 132°27′58″E
- Operator: Hiroshima Electric Railway
- Lines: █ Hijiyama Line; Route

Other information
- Station code: H8

History
- Opened: December 27, 1944
Location

Minami-machi 2-chome is a Hiroden station (tram stop) on Hiroden Hijiyama Line, located in Minami-ku, Hiroshima.

== Routes ==
From Minami-machi 2-chome Station, there are one of Hiroden Streetcar routes.

- Hiroshima Station - (via Hijiyama-shita) - Hiroshima Port Route

== Connections ==
█ Hijiyama Line

Minami-kuyakusho-mae — Minami-machi 2-chome — Minami-machi 6-chome

== History ==
- Opened on December 27, 1944
- Service was stopped on February 1, 1945
- Reopened on July 1, 1948

== See also ==
- Hiroden lines and routes
