= Hiroshima City Museum of Contemporary Art =

Museum in Japan

Coordinates: 34.38638°N 132.473365°E

- Established: 1989
- Location: 1-1 Hijitama-kōen, Minami-ku, Hiroshima
- Director: Junji Teraguchi
- Curator: Naoko Sumi
- Website: www.hiroshima-moca.jp/en/

The Hiroshima City Museum of Contemporary Art (広島市現代美術館, Hiroshima-shi Gendai Bijutsukan) is an art museum founded in 1989. It is in Hijiyama Park in Hiroshima, Japan. The building was designed by architect Kisho Kurokawa. It was the first public contemporary art museum to open in Japan, and its exhibitions focus on post-1945, contemporary emerging artists and artworks that link contemporary art with Hiroshima.

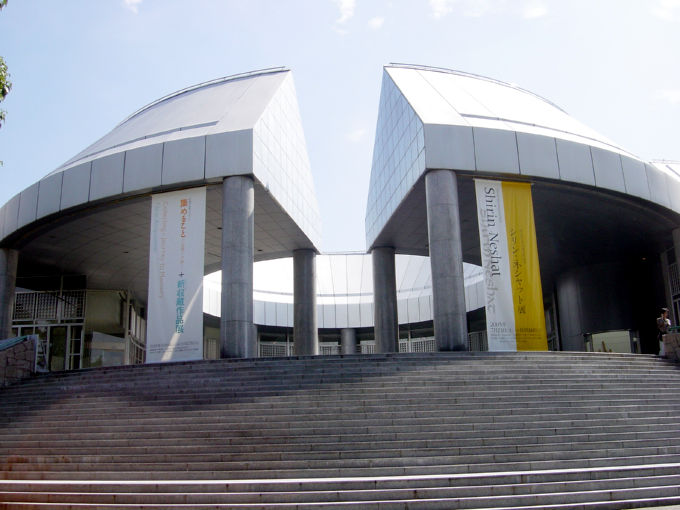
Entrance

== Representative collections ==
Works	Artist
The Arch, Atom Piece	Henry Moore
Flower Garden	Oscar Oiwa
Akino Tsubasa	Kiichi Sumikawa
Tea time in the midnight	Akinori Sako
Marilyn	Andy Warhol
Raqqa I, Talladega Three II	Frank Stella
untitled	Donald Judd
Wine	Morris Louis
Sakanano Atama (The head of a Fish)	Aimitsu
Fukugo gattai 401 Hiroshima	Yoshishige Saito
Dome	Isamu Wakabayashi
Čovek sa mrtvim detom (Man with a dead child)	Jovan Soldatović

== Access ==
- Hiroden Hijiyama-shita Station

== See also ==
- Hiroshima Museum of Art
- Hiroshima Prefectural Art Museum
