= Matoba-cho Station =

Railway station in Hiroshima, Japan

Coordinates: 34.3933°N 132.4749°E

Matoba-cho 的場町
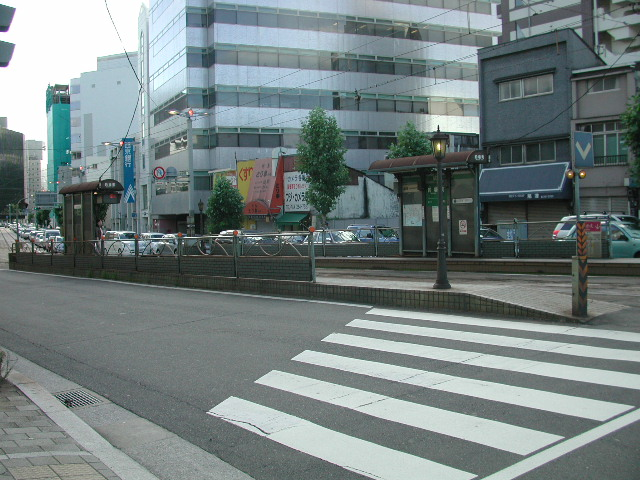

General information
- Location: Matoba-cho, Minami-ku, Hiroshima; Japan
- Operator: Hiroshima Electric Railway
- Line: Circular Route

Other information
- Station code: L01

History
- Opened: November 23, 1912 (1st), March 2026 (2nd)
- Closed: August 3, 2025 (1st)
Location

Matoba-cho is a Hiroden station (tram stop) on Hiroden Main Line and Hiroden Hijiyama Line, located in Matoba-cho, Minami-ku, Hiroshima.

== Routes ==
Loop Line

== Connections ==
█ Circular Line

Inari-machi — Matoba-cho — Danbara 1-chome

== History ==
- Opened Main Line on November 23, 1912.
- Opened Hijiyama Line on December 27, 1944.
- Temporarily closed on 3 August 2025.

== See also ==
- Hiroden lines and routes
