= Ujina 2-chōme Station =

Railway station in Hiroshima, Japan

Coordinates: 34°21′58″N 132°27′52″E

Ujina 2-chōme 宇品二丁目
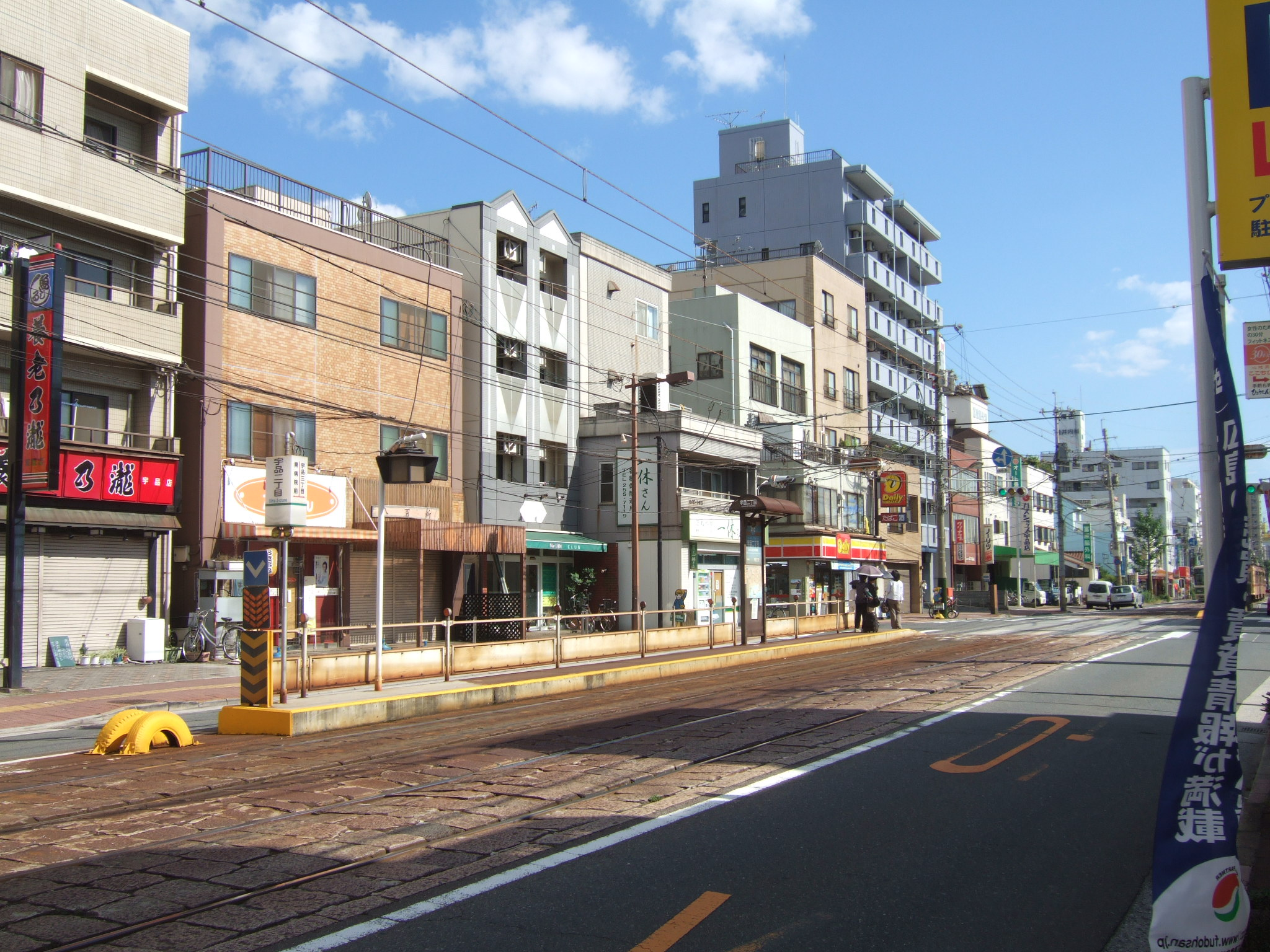

General information
- Location: Ujina-miyuki 2-chōme & Ujina-kanda 1-chōme, Minami-ku, Hiroshima; Japan
- Operator: Hiroshima Electric Railway
- Lines: █ Hiroden Ujina Line; Route

Other information
- Station code: U12

History
- Opened: December 27, 1935
Location

Ujina 2-chōme is a Hiroden station (tram stop) on Hiroden Ujina Line in Minami-ku, Hiroshima.

== Routes ==
From Ujina 2-chōme Station, there are three of Hiroden Streetcar routes.

- Hiroshima Station - Hiroshima Port Route
- Hiroden-nishi-hiroshima - Hiroshima Port Route
- Hiroshima Station - (via Hijiyama-shita) - Hiroshima Port Route

== Connections ==
█ Ujina Line

Kenbyoin-mae — Ujina 2-chōme — Ujina 3-chōme

== Around station ==
- Hiroshima City Museum of History and Traditional Crafts

== History ==
- Opened as "Jyosen-mae" on December 27, 1935.
- Closed from May 1942 to August 1945.
- Reopened in August 1945.
- Renamed to "Jyoshidai-mae" in 1950.
- Renamed to "Ujina 13-chome" in 1953.
- Renamed to the present name "Ujina 2-chome" on September 1, 1968.

== See also ==
- Hiroden lines and routes
- List of railway stations in Japan
