= Minami-machi 6-chome Station =

Railway station in Hiroshima, Japan

Minami-machi 6-chōme 皆実町六丁目
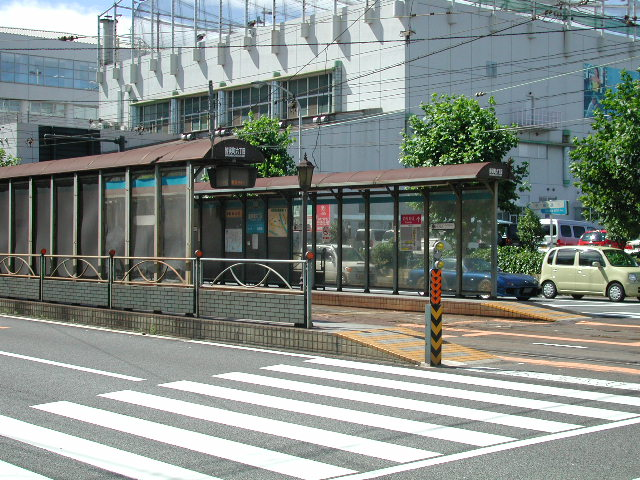

General information
- Location: Minami-machi, Minami-ku, Hiroshima; Japan
- Coordinates: 34°22′27.12″N 132°27′50.61″E
- Operator: Hiroshima Electric Railway
- Lines: █ Hiroden Ujina Line █ Hijiyama Line; Route

Other information
- Station code: U9/H9

History
- Opened: December 27, 1935
Location

Minami-machi 6-chōme is a Hiroden station (tram stop) on Hiroden Ujina Line and Hiroden Hijiyama Line, located in Minami-machi, Minami-ku, Hiroshima.

== Routes ==
From Minami-machi 6-chōme Station, there are three of Hiroden Streetcar routes.

- Hiroshima Station - Hiroshima Port Route
- Hiroden-nishi-hiroshima - Hiroshima Port Route
- Hiroshima Station - (via Hijiyama-shita) - Hiroshima Port Route

== Connections ==
█ Ujina Line

Miyuki-bashi — Minami-machi 6-chōme — Hirodaifuzokugakkō-mae

█ Hijiyama Line

Minami-machi 2-chōme — Minami-machi 6-chōme — Hirodaifuzokugakkō-mae

== Around station ==
- Nekoda Memorial Gymnasium

== History ==
- Opened as "Minami-machi" tram stop, on December 27, 1935.
- Renamed to "Minami-machi 3-chome" tram stop, after 1945.
- Renamed to the present name "Minami-machi 6-chome", on May 1, 1971.

== See also ==
- Hiroden lines and routes
- List of railway stations in Japan
