= Hijiyama-bashi Station =

Hiroden station in Japan

Coordinates: 34.3831°N 132.4688°E

Hijiyama-bashi Station 比治山橋
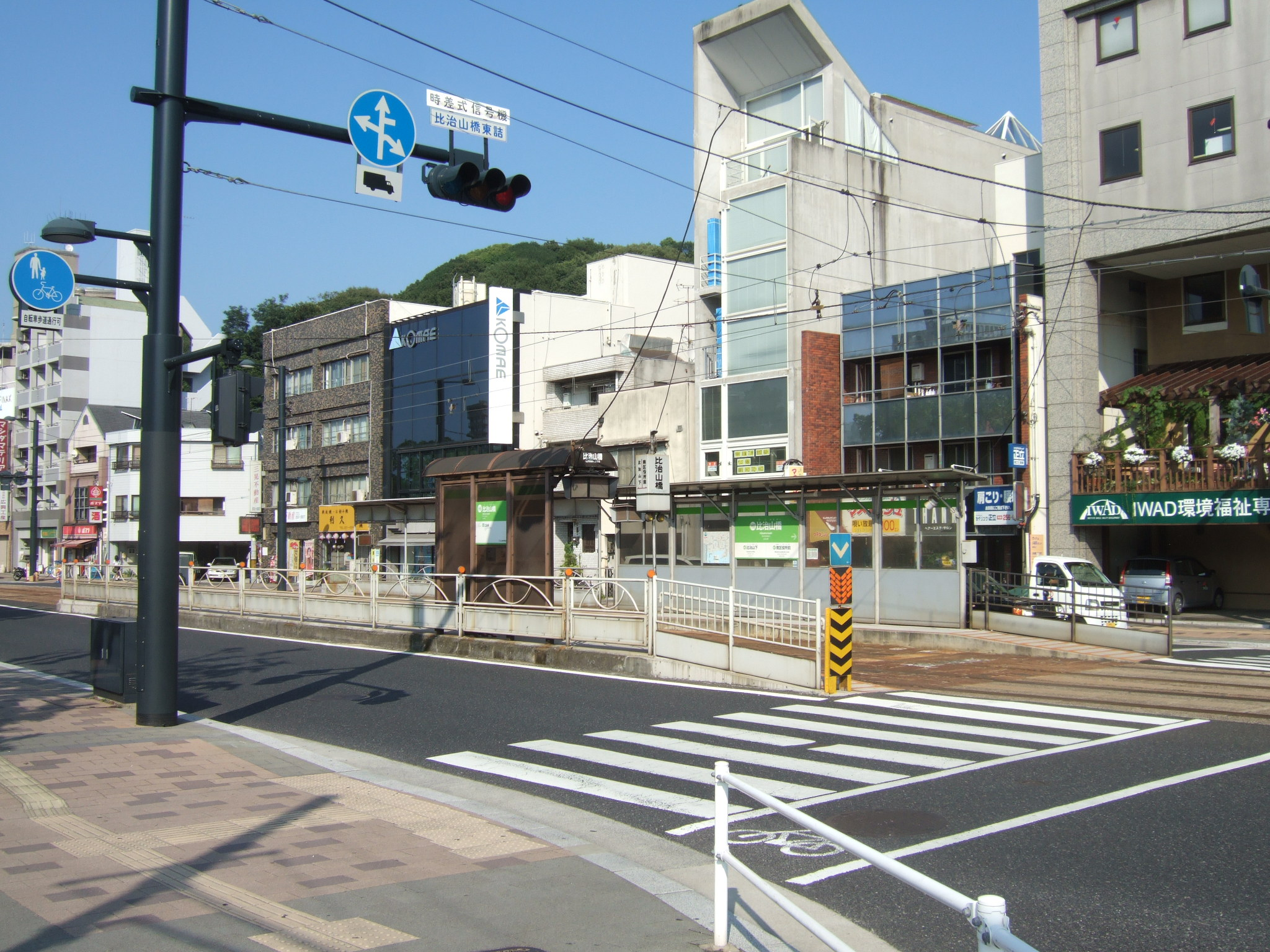

General information
- Location: Hijiyama-hon-machi, Minami-ku, Hiroshima; Japan
- Operator: Hiroshima Electric Railway
- Lines: █ Hiroden Hijiyama Line; Route

Other information
- Station code: H6

History
- Opened: December 27, 1944
Location

Hijiyama-bashi is a Hiroden station (tram stop) on Hiroden Hijiyama Line, located in Hijiyama-hon-machi, Minami-ku, Hiroshima.

== Routes ==
From Hijiyama-bashi Station, there are one of Hiroden Streetcar routes.

- Hiroshima Station - (via Hijiyama-shita) - Hiroshima Port Route

== Connections ==
█ Hijiyama Line

Hijiyama-shita — Hijiyama-bashi — Minami-kuyakusho-mae

== Around station ==
- Hijiyama Park
- Hijiyama River
- Hijiyama Bridge

== History ==
- Opened on December 27, 1944

== See also ==
- Hiroden lines and routes
