= Hirodai Fuzokugakko Mae Station =

Railway station in Hiroshima, Japan

Coordinates: 34°22′18″N 132°27′52″E

Hirodai Fuzokugakkō Mae Station 広大附属学校前
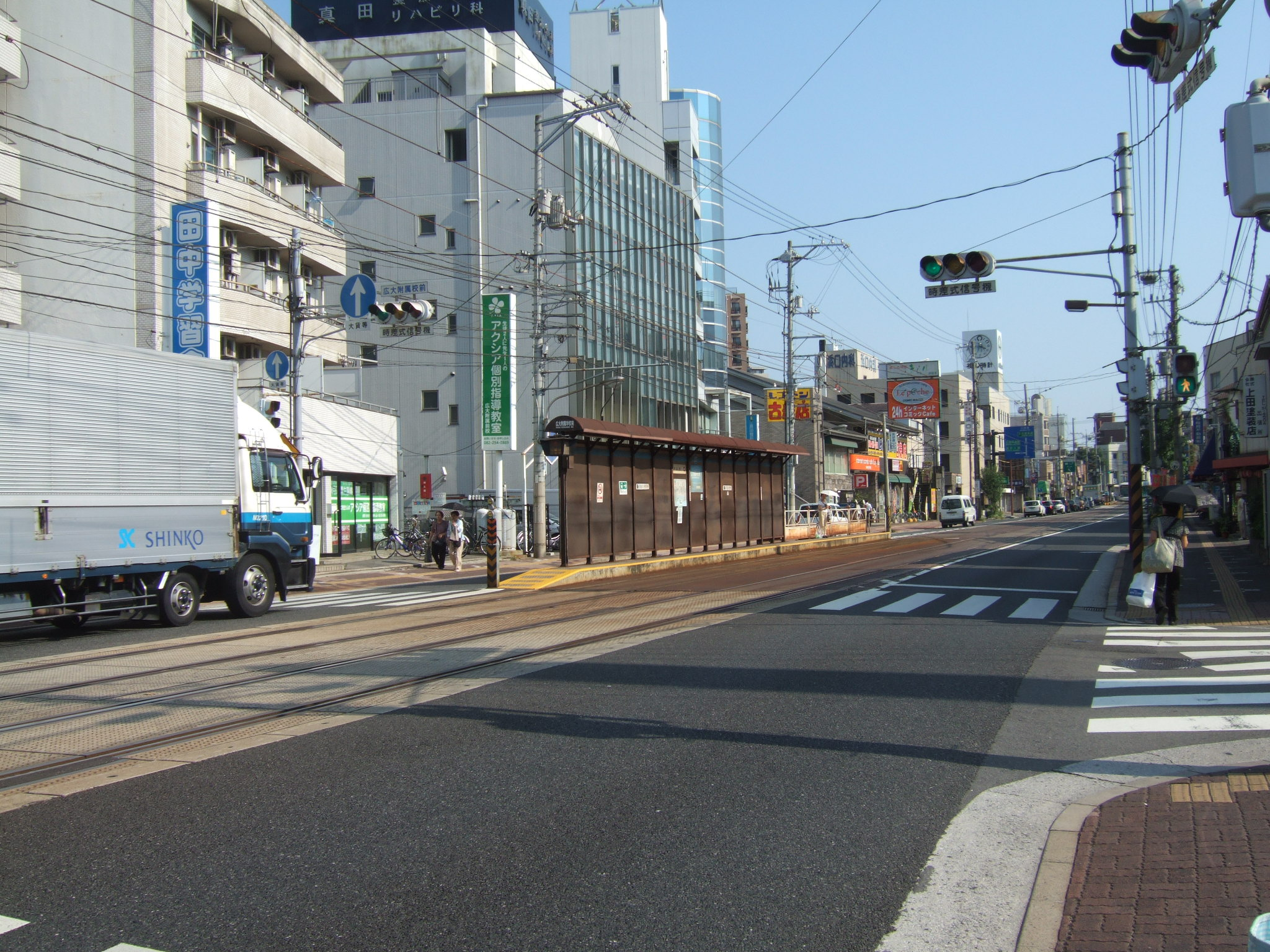

General information
- Location: Midori-1-chome & Minamimachi-6-chome, Minami-ku, Hiroshima; Japan
- Operator: Hiroshima Electric Railway
- Lines: █ Hiroden Ujina Line; Route

Other information
- Station code: U10

History
- Opened: December 27, 1935
Location

Hirodai Fuzokugakkō Mae is a Hiroden station (tram stop) on Hiroden Ujina Line, located in Minami-ku, Hiroshima.

== Routes ==
From Hirodai Fuzokugakkō Mae Station, there are four of Hiroden Streetcar routes.

- Hiroshima Station - Hiroshima Port Route
- Hiroden-nishi-hiroshima - Hiroshima Port Route
- Hiroshima Station - (via Hijiyama-shita) - Hiroshima Port Route

== Connections ==
█ Ujina Line

Minami-machi 6-chome — Hirodai Fuzokugakkō Mae — Kenbyoin-mae

== Around station ==
- Elementary School attached to Hiroshima University
- High School attached to Hiroshima University

== History ==
- Opened on as "Miyuki-bashi" tram stop, named from the bridge "Miyuki", on December 27, 1935.
- Closed from May 1942 to August 1945.
- Reopened in August 1945, and renamed to "Minami-bunko-mae".
- Renamed to "Hirodai-Kyoyoubu-mae" in 1955.
- Renamed to "Hirodai-Fuzoku-Kouko-mae" on February 28, 1961.
- Renamed to the present name "" on June 10, 1964

== See also ==
- Hiroden lines and routes
- List of railway stations in Japan
