= Hiroshima City Museum of History and Traditional Crafts =

Coordinates: 34°21′57.5″N 132°27′42.6″E

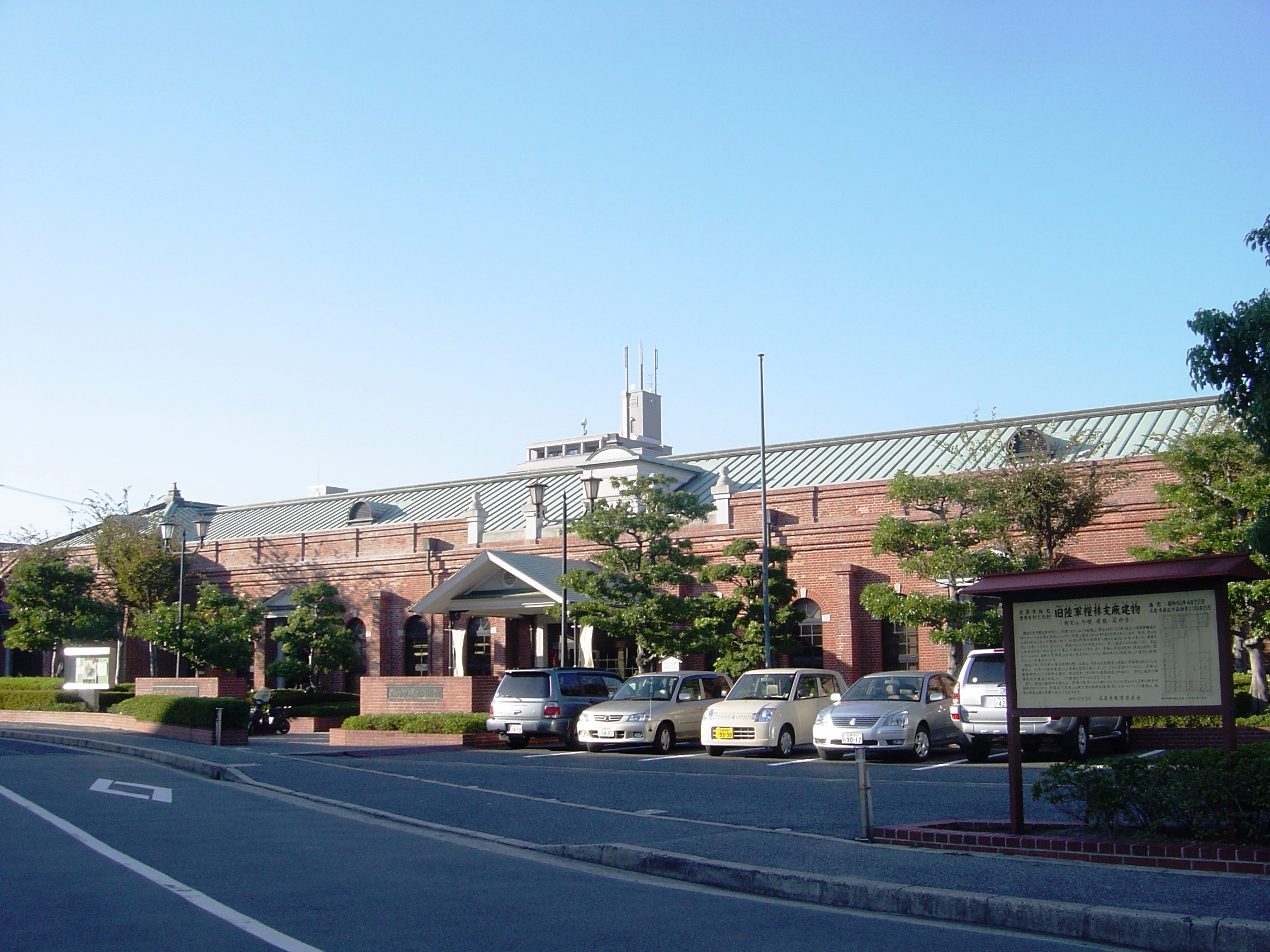
- Established: 1911, (1985)
- Location: 6–20 Ujina-miyuki 2-chome, Minami-ku, Hiroshima
- Website: Explore Hiroshima: Hiroshima City Museum of History and Traditional Crafts

The Hiroshima City Museum of History and Traditional Crafts is a history museum in Ujina-nishi Park in Hiroshima, Japan.

== History ==
- Opened as a packing plant of Ujina provisions and fodder plant for Imperial Army in March 1911.
- Handed over from a private company to Hiroshima City in 1977.
- Repaired the building in 1984.
- Opened as the museum in 1985.

== Museum ==
=== Permanent exhibits ===
- Sadaaki Senda and Ujina Port – started in 1884, completed in 1889
- History of the plant building – from 1894 to 1985
- Oyster farming – since 1532–1555
- Laver farming – since Edo period
- Yagi irrigation channel – opened in 1768 by Hiroshima Han
- Rice farming
- Hemp production – started in the 10th century, peaked in 1919, finished in the 1950s.
- Kamoji production – old comb for women – since 1624
- Japanese Umbrella production – since 1615, peaked in 1920
- Geta (footwear) production – since 1622
- Textile production of Antheraea yamamai cocoon
- Wooden boat building
- Life with the fire

=== Educational programs ===
- Saturday school
- Summer school for junior and senior high school students
- Special events

== Access ==
- Hiroden Ujina 2-chome Station
- Hiroshima Bus Miyuki 2-chome or Bay City Ujina bus stop
