= Tawaramachi Station =

Tawaramachi Station (田原町駅) is the name of two train stations in Japan:

- Tawaramachi Station (Fukui)
- Tawaramachi Station (Tokyo)
