= Ujina 3-chōme Station =

Tram stop in Hiroshima, Japan

Coordinates: 34°21′51″N 132°27′52″E

Ujina 3-chōme 宇品三丁目
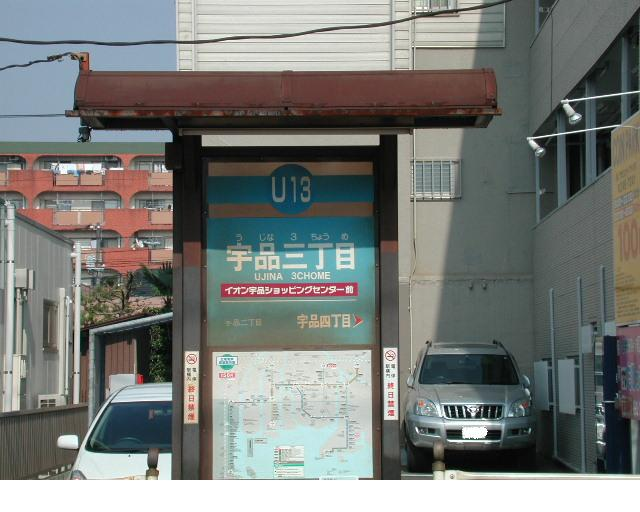

General information
- Location: Ujina-miyuki 3-chōme & Ujina-kanda 2-chōme, Minami-ku, Hiroshima; Japan
- Operator: Hiroshima Electric Railway
- Lines: █ Hiroden Ujina Line; Route

Other information
- Station code: U13

History
- Opened: December 27, 1935
Location

Ujina 3-chōme is a Hiroden station (tram stop) on Hiroden Ujina Line, located in Minami-ku, Hiroshima.

== Routes ==
From Ujina 3-chōme Station, there are three of Hiroden Streetcar routes.

- Hiroshima Station - Hiroshima Port Route
- Hiroden-nishi-hiroshima - Hiroshima Port Route
- Hiroshima Station - (via Hijiyama-shita) - Hiroshima Port Route

== Connections ==
█ Ujina Line

Ujina 2-chōme — Ujina 3-chōme — Ujina 4-chōme

== Around station ==
- ÆON Ujina Shopping Center
  - JUSCO Ujina
- FamilyMart

== History ==
- Opened as "10-chome" on December 27, 1935.
- Renamed to "Ujina 10-chome" on March 30, 1960.
- Renamed to the present name "Ujina 3-chome" on September 1, 1968.

== See also ==
- Hiroden lines and routes
- List of railway stations in Japan
