= Hiroden Hijiyama Line =

Tram line in Hiroshima, Japan

The Hijiyama Line (比治山線, Hijiyama-sen), also called the Minami Line (皆実線, Minami-sen), is a streetcar line of Hiroshima Electric Railway (Hiroden) in Hiroshima, Japan. The line has been operated since 1944.

Although the line is registered at the Ministry of Land, Infrastructure, Transport and Tourism under the rarely used name "Minani Line", Hiroden officially calls it "Hijiyama Line".

The total distance of the line is 2.5 kilometers. Route 5 operates on the line. The line has seven stations.

== Stations ==
No.	Station	Routes	Connections
M02	Inari-machi	L	█ Hiroden Main Line
H01	Matsukawa-cho		
H02	Hijiyama-shita	L	Hiroden Circular Line
H03	Hijiyama-bashi	L	
H04	Minami-kuyakusho-mae	L	
H05	Minami-machi 2-chome	L	
U09	Minami-machi 6-chome	L	█ Hiroden Ujina Line

=== Inactive stations (To be split into their own line page past end-March) ===
- Matoba-cho Station
- Danbara 1-chome Station
