= Prefectural University of Hiroshima =

University in Hiroshima Prefecture, Japan

Coordinates: 34.36625°N 132.46825°E

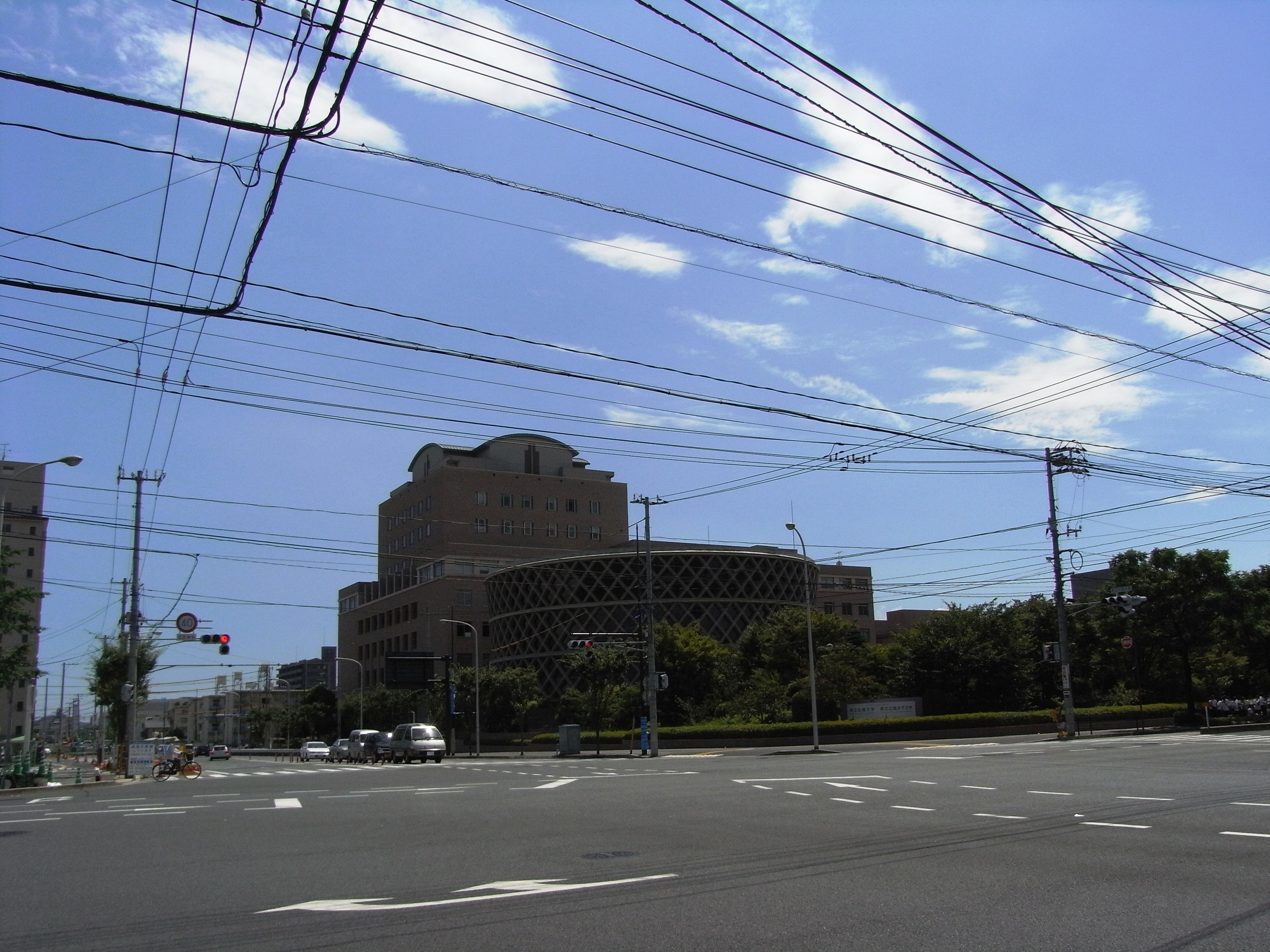
- Hiroshima Campus
- Type: public university
- Established: 2005
- Location: Hiroshima, Hiroshima Prefecture, Japan
- Website: Official website

Prefectural University of Hiroshima (県立広島大学, Kenritsu Hiroshima Daigaku) is a public university in Hiroshima Prefecture, Japan, established in 2005.

It has three campuses, located in these cities:

- Hiroshima (in the Ward of Minami)
- Shōbara
- Mihara
