= Inarimachi Station =

Inarimachi or Inari-machi is the name of the following stations:

- Inarimachi Station (Toyama), a train station in Toyama Prefecture operated by the Toyama Chihō Railway.
- Inari-machi Station (Hiroshima), a tram station in Hiroshima Prefecture operated by Hiroden.
