= Hijiyama-shita Station =

Hiroden station in Japan

Coordinates: 34.3879°N 132.4716°E

Hijiyama-shita Station 比治山下
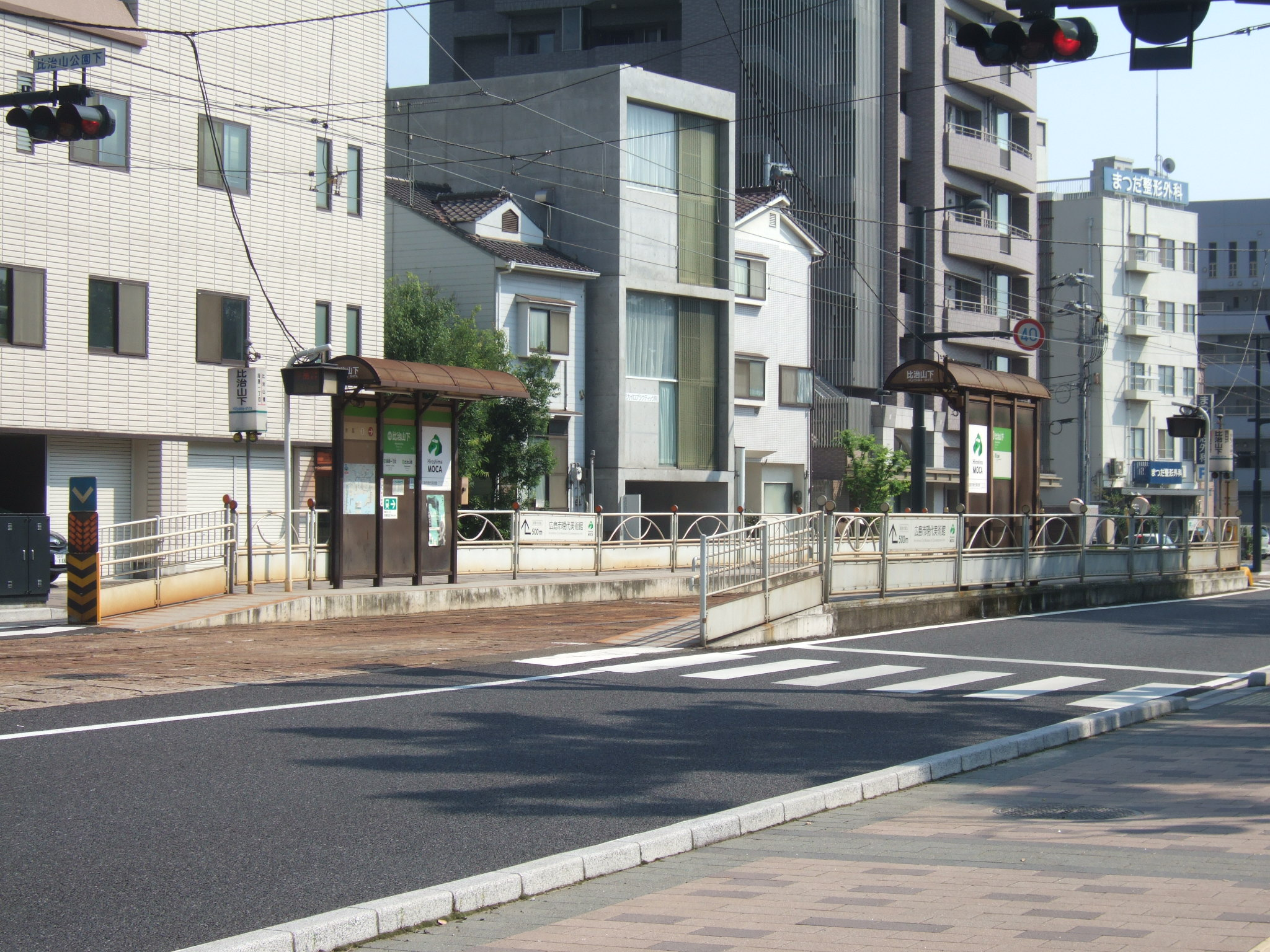

General information
- Location: Hijiyama-cho, Minami-ku, Hiroshima; Japan
- Operator: Hiroshima Electric Railway
- Lines: █ Hiroden Hijiyama Line; Route

Other information
- Station code: H02

History
- Opened: December 27, 1944
Location

Hijiyama-shita is a Hiroden station (tram stop) on Hiroden Hijiyama Line, located at the foot of Mt. Hijiyama, in Hijiyama-cho, Minami-ku, Hiroshima.

== Routes ==
From Hijiyama-shita Station, there are one of Hiroden Streetcar routes.

- Hiroshima Station - (via Hijiyama-shita) - Hiroshima Port Route

== Connections ==
█ Hijiyama Line

Matsukawa-cho — Hijiyama-shita — Hijiyama-bashi

== Around station ==
- Hijiyama Park
- Hiroshima City Museum of Contemporary Art
- Hiroshima City Manga Library
- Hijiyama River

== History ==
- Opened on December 27, 1944.

== See also ==
- Hiroden lines and routes
