= Kanayama-cho Station =

Tram stop in Hiroshima, Japan

Coordinates: 34.3930°N 132.4680°E

Kanayama-cho 銀山町
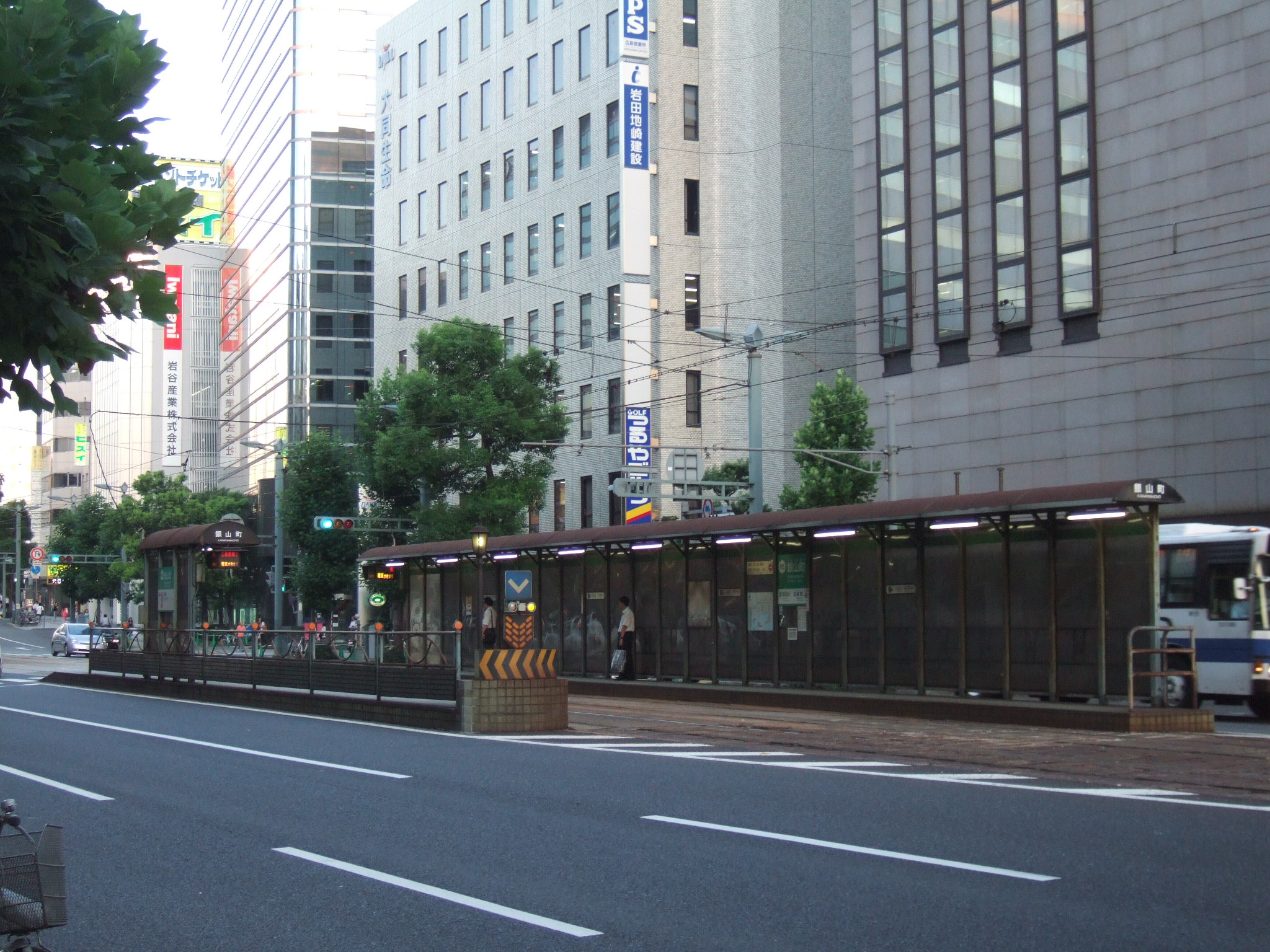

General information
- Location: Kanayama-cho, Naka-ku, Hiroshima; Japan
- Operator: Hiroshima Electric Railway
- Lines: █ Hiroden Main Line; Route

Other information
- Station code: M03

History
- Opened: November 23, 1912
Location

Kanayama-cho is a Hiroden station (tram stop) on Hiroden Main Line, located in Kanayama-cho, Naka-ku, Hiroshima.

== Routes ==
From Kanayama-cho Station, there are three of Hiroden Streetcar routes.

- Hiroshima Station - Hiroshima Port Route
- Hiroshima Station - Hiroden-miyajima-guchi Route
- Hiroshima Station - Eba Route

== Connections ==
█ Main Line

Inari-machi — Kanayama-cho — Ebisu-cho

== Around station ==
- Momiji Bank - head office
- Hiroshima Mazda building
- Hiroshima Municipal Noboricho Elementary School
- Elisabeth University of Music
- Hiroshima World peace Memorial Cathedral
- SOLARE HOTELS&RESORTS CHISUN HOTEL HIROSHIMA

== History ==
- Opened as "Yamagichi-cho" on November 23, 1912.
- Renamed to the present name "Kanayama-cho" on April 1, 1965.

== See also ==
- Hiroden lines and routes
