= Inarichō Station =

Metro station in Tokyo, Japan

Coordinates: 35.711356°N 139.782668°E

Inarichō Station 稲荷町駅

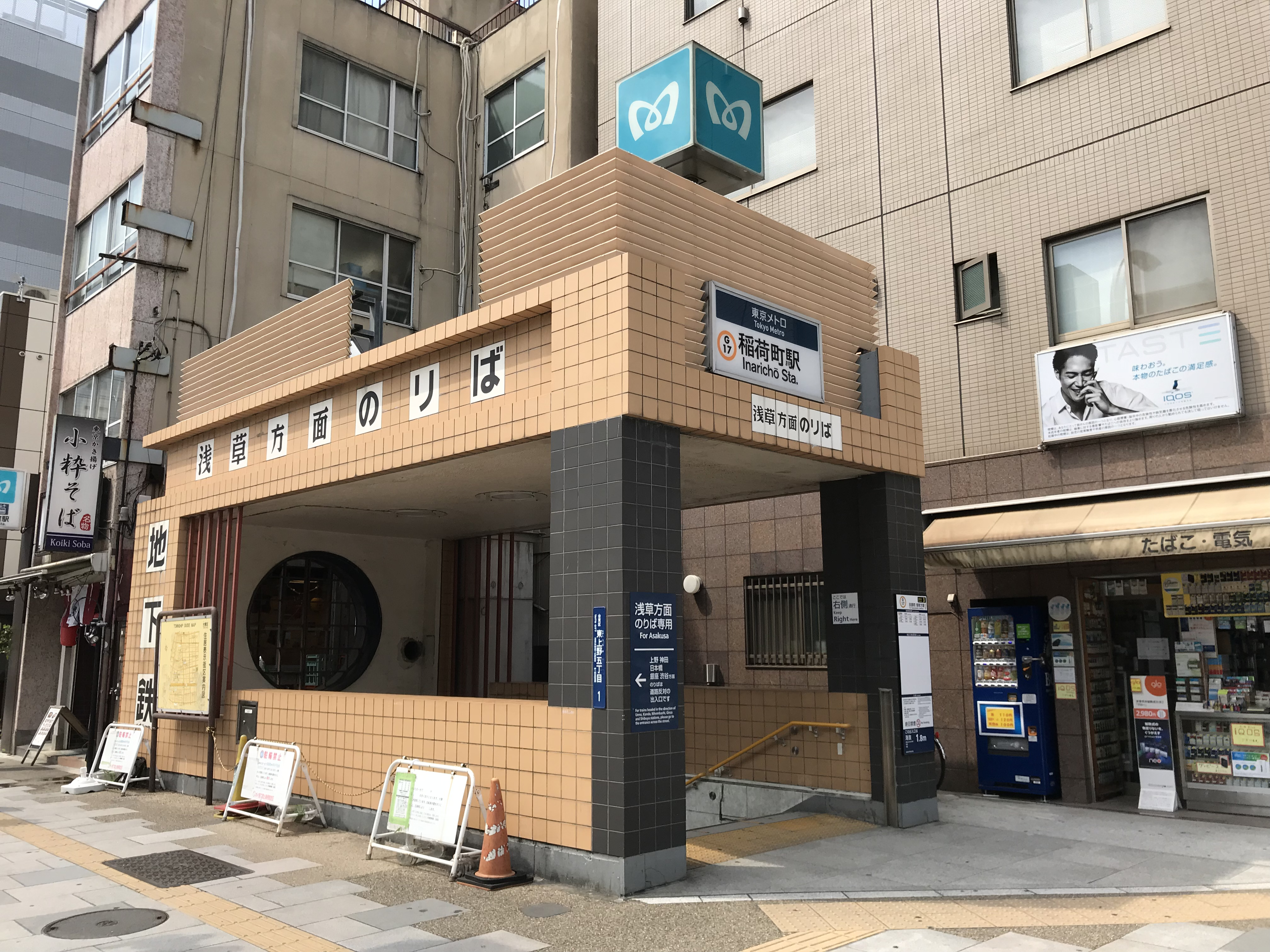
- Tokyo Metro Inarichō Station station Exit3 （August 11th, 2018）

Japanese name
- Shinjitai: 稲荷町駅
- Kyūjitai: 稻荷甼驛
- Hiragana: いなりちょうえき

General information
- Location: 3-33-11 Higashi-Ueno, Taitō-ku, Tokyo 110-0015; Japan
- Operator: Tokyo Metro
- Line: Ginza Line
- Platforms: 2 side platforms
- Tracks: 2

Construction
- Structure type: Underground

Other information
- Station code: G-17

History
- Opened: 30 December 1927; 98 years ago

Passengers
- FY2013: 14,831 daily

Services
Preceding station	Tokyo Metro	Following station
Ueno towards Shibuya	Ginza Line	Tawaramachi towards Asakusa
Location
- Location within Tokyo Yamanote Loop Location within Tokyo wards area Location within Japan

Inarichō Station (稲荷町駅, Inarichō-eki) is a subway station on the Tokyo Metro Ginza Line in Taitō, Tokyo, Japan, operated by the Tokyo subway operator Tokyo Metro. It is numbered "G-17".

== Lines ==
Inarichō Station is served by the Tokyo Metro Ginza Line from Shibuya to Asakusa.

== Station layout ==
The station has two side platforms located on the first basement (B1F) level, serving two tracks.

=== Platforms ===
1	Ginza Line	for Ueno, Ginza, and Shibuya
2	Ginza Line	for Asakusa

There is no connection between the two platforms, and platform 1 (for Shibuya-bound trains) is accessed from the streel-level entrances 1 and 2 on the south side of Asakusa Dori, while platform 2 (for Asakusa-bound trains) is accessed from entrance 3 on the north side.

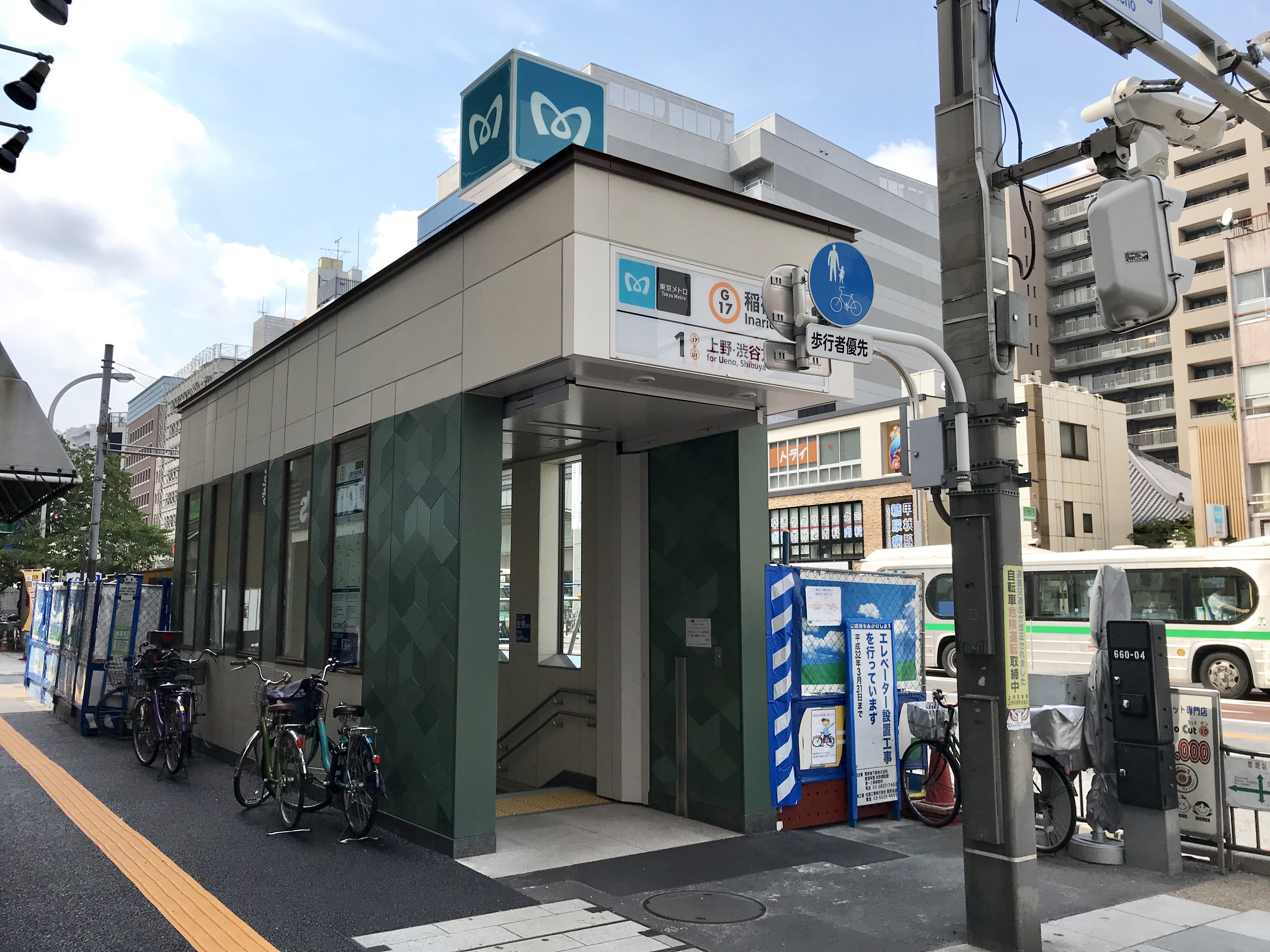
Tokyo Metro Inarichō Station station Exit2 (August 11, 2018)

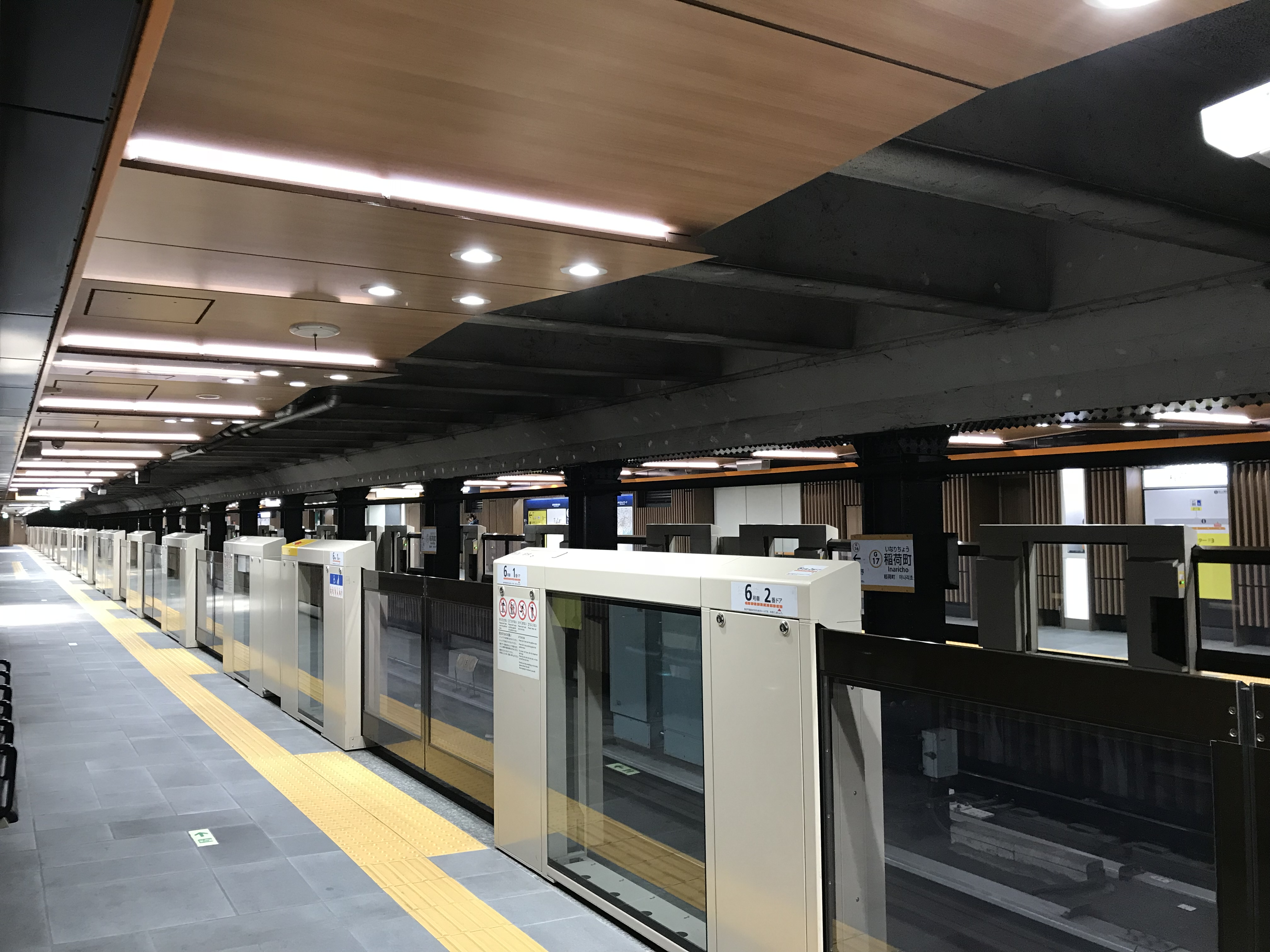
platform (January 4, 2018)

== History ==
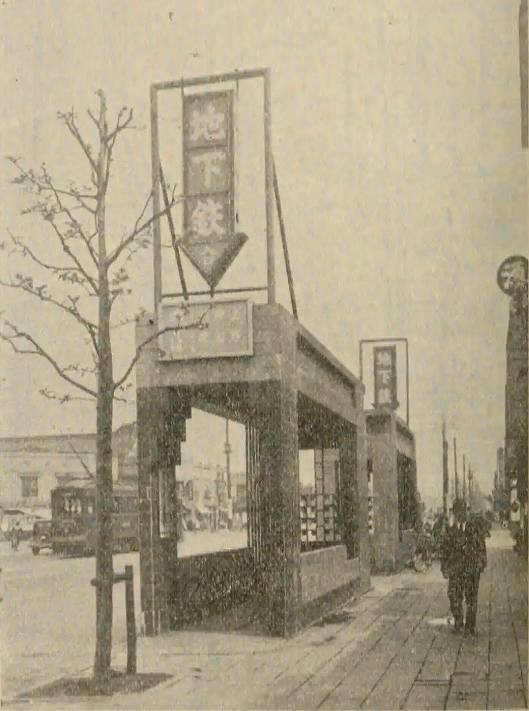
Inaricho station in the 1930s

The Tokyo Underground Railway Inarichō Station is part of the first section of underground railway line in Asia, opened on 30 December 1927. Therefore, next to Ueno Station, Tawaramachi Station, and Asakusa Station it is one of the four oldest underground railway stations in Asia.

The station facilities were inherited by Tokyo Metro after the privatization of the Teito Rapid Transit Authority (TRTA) in 2004.

== Passenger statistics ==
In fiscal 2013, the station was the least used on the Ginza Line and the 127th busiest on the Tokyo Metro network with an average of 14,831 passengers daily.

The passenger statistics for previous years are as shown below.

Fiscal year	Daily average
2011	13,904
2012	14,328
2013	14,831

== See also ==
- List of railway stations in Japan
