= Ebisu-cho Station (Hiroshima) =

Tram stop in Hiroshima, Japan

Coordinates: 34.3934°N 132.4649°E

Ebisu-chō Station 胡町
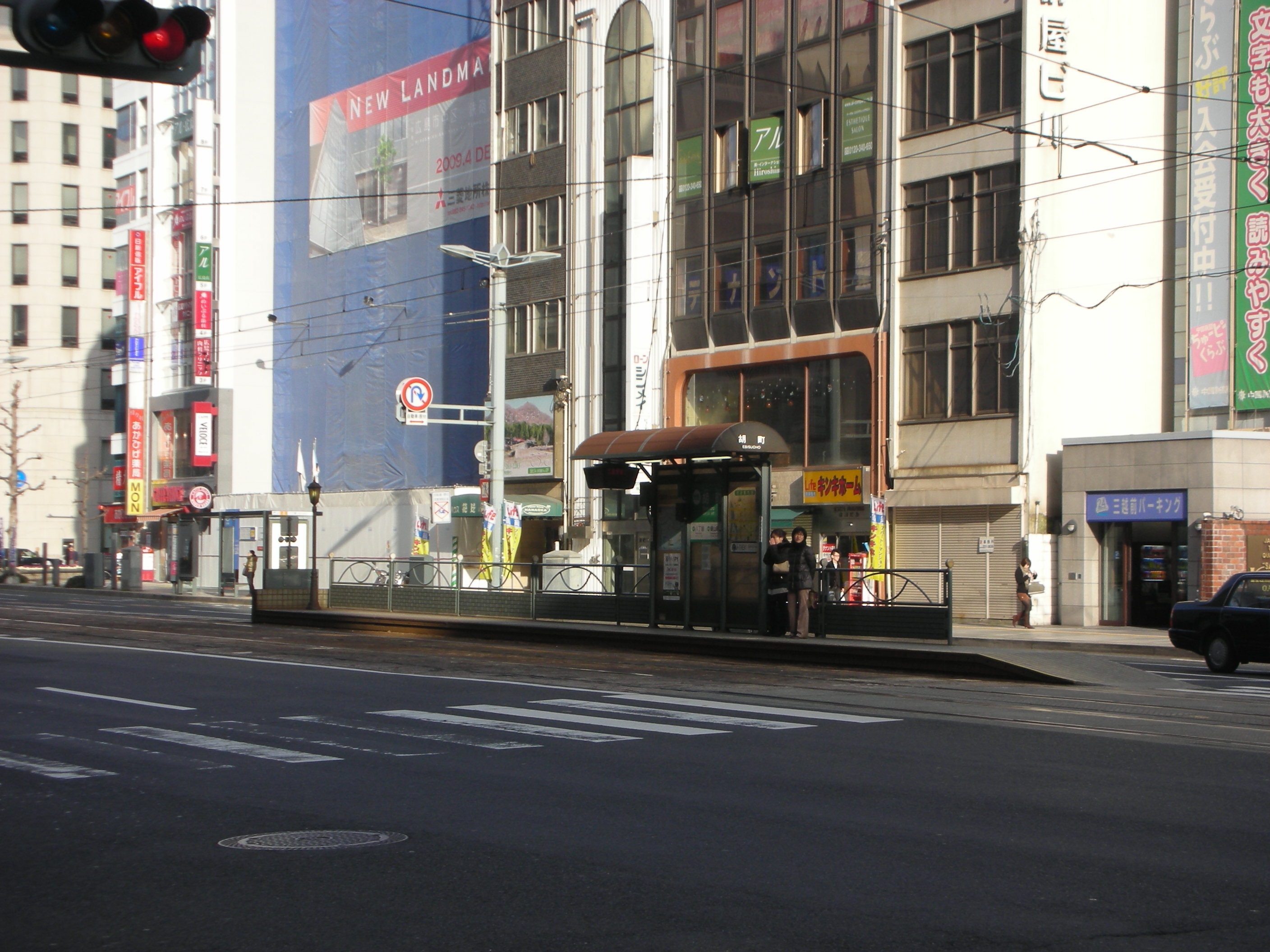

General information
- Location: Ebisu-cho, Naka-ku, Hiroshima; Japan
- Operator: Hiroshima Electric Railway
- Lines: █ Hiroden Main Line; Route

Other information
- Station code: M04

History
- Opened: November 23, 1912
Location

Ebisu-chō (胡町) is a Hiroden station (tram stop) on Hiroden Main Line, located in Ebisu-cho, Naka-ku, Hiroshima.

== Routes ==
From Ebisu-cho Station, there are three of Hiroden Streetcar routes.

- Hiroshima Station - Hiroshima Port Route
- Hiroshima Station - Hiroden-miyajima-guchi Route
- Hiroshima Station - Eba Route

== Connections ==
█ Main Line

Kanayama-cho — Ebisu-cho — Hatchobori

== Around station ==
- Mitsukoshi Hiroshima
- Tenmaya Hiroshima

== History ==
- Opened as "Kami-nagarekawa-cho" on November 23, 1912.
- Renamed to "Nagarekawa-cho" in 1927.
- Renamed to the present name "Ebisu-cho" on April 1, 1965.

== See also ==
- Hiroden lines and routes
