= Tawaramachi Station (Tokyo) =

Metro station in Tokyo, Japan

Tawaramachi Station 田原町駅

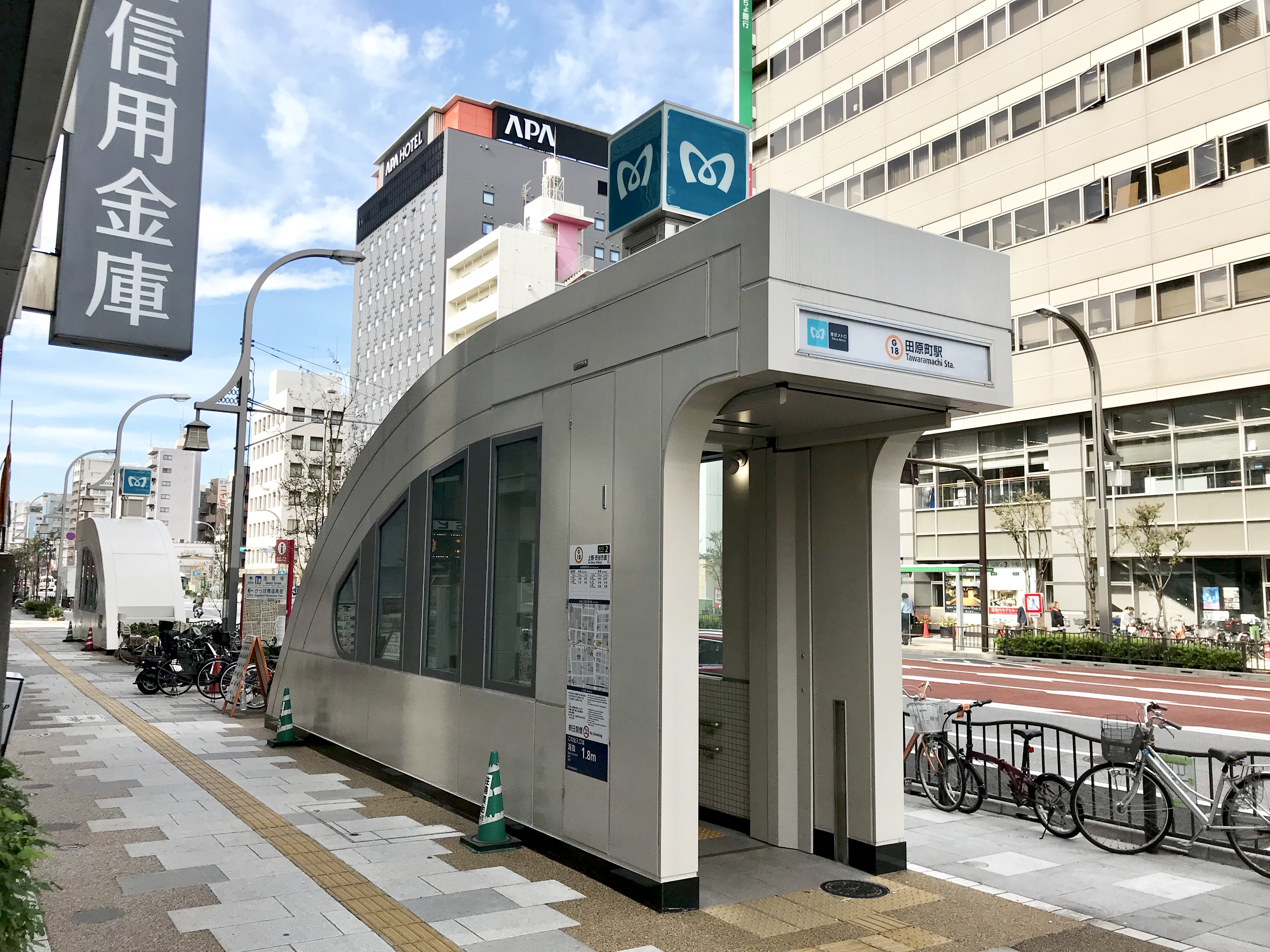
- Entrance 2 (October 24th, 2018)

General information
- Location: 1-1-18 Nishi-asakusa, Taitō-ku, Tokyo; Japan
- Coordinates: 35.70988°N 139.79079°E
- Operator: Tokyo Metro
- Line: Ginza Line
- Platforms: 2 side platforms
- Tracks: 2

Construction
- Structure type: Underground

Other information
- Station code: G-18
- Website: Official website

History
- Opened: 30 December 1927; 98 years ago

Passengers
- FY2011: 26,216 daily

Services
Preceding station	Tokyo Metro	Following station
Inarichō towards Shibuya	Ginza Line	Asakusa Terminus
Location
- Location within Special wards of Tokyo Location within Tokyo Bay and Bōsō Peninsula Location within Tokyo Location within Japan

Tawaramachi Station (田原町駅, Tawaramachi-eki) is a subway station on the Tokyo Metro Ginza Line in Taitō, Tokyo, Japan, operated by the Tokyo subway operator Tokyo Metro. It is numbered "G-18".

While situated relatively close to Asakusa on the Tsukuba Express, there are no transfer passageways between the two stations.

== Lines ==
Tawaramachi Station is served by the Tokyo Metro Ginza Line from Shibuya to Asakusa.

== Station layout ==
The station has two side platforms located on the first basement (B1F) level, serving two tracks.

=== Platforms ===
1	Ginza Line	for Ueno, Ginza, and Shibuya
2	Ginza Line	for Asakusa

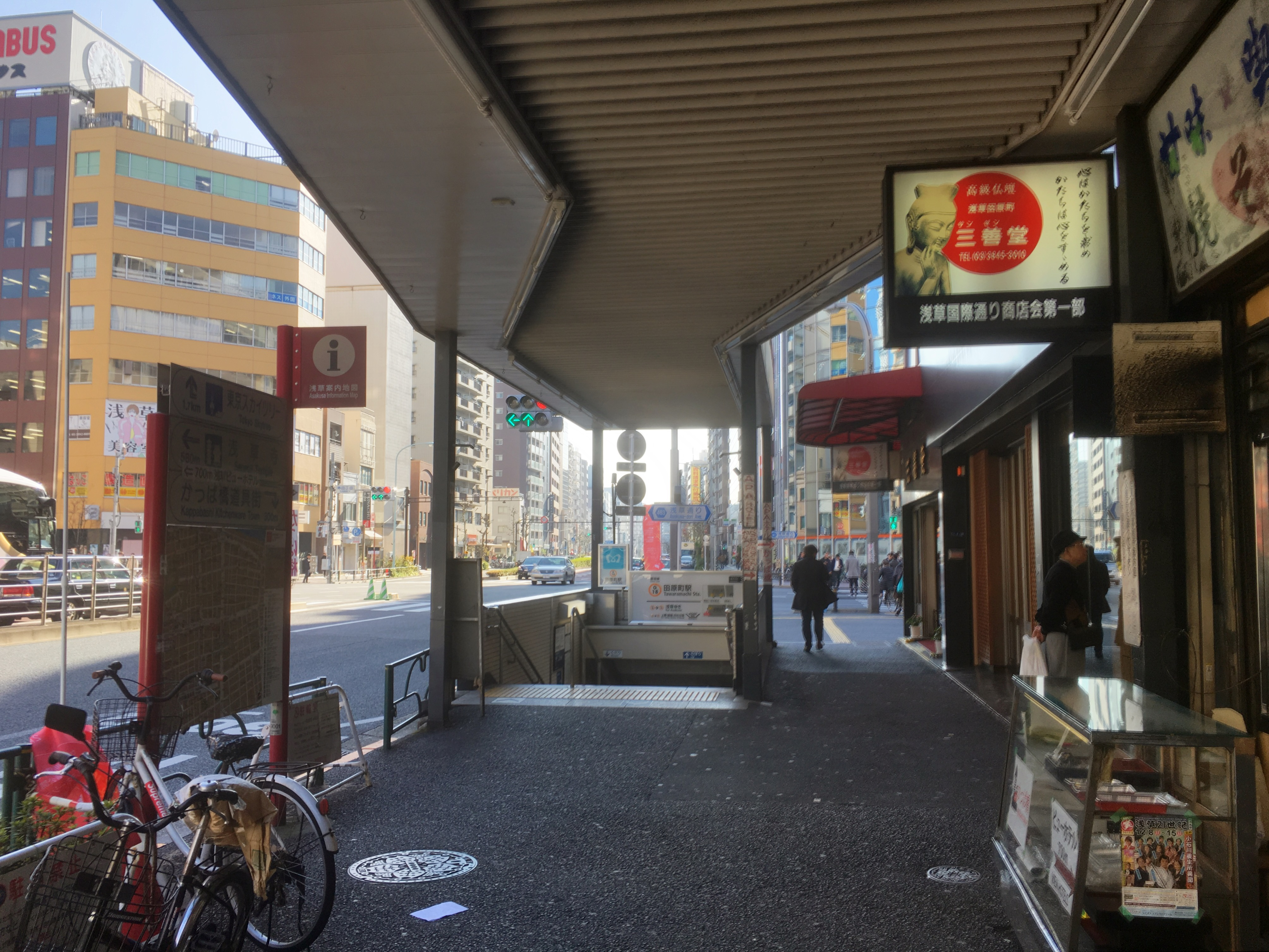
Entrance No. 3 in December 2019

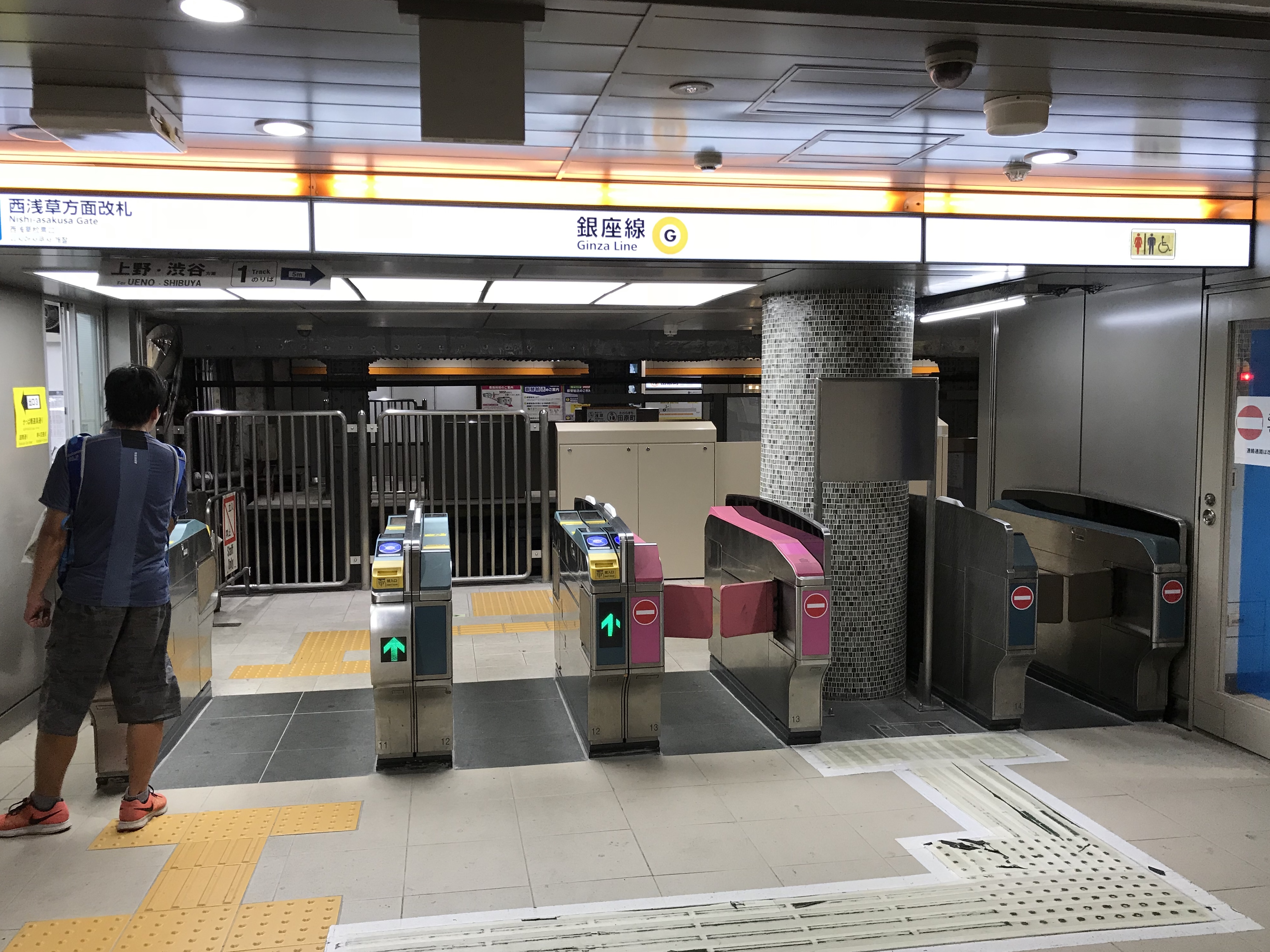
Nishiasakusa District Gate in August 2018

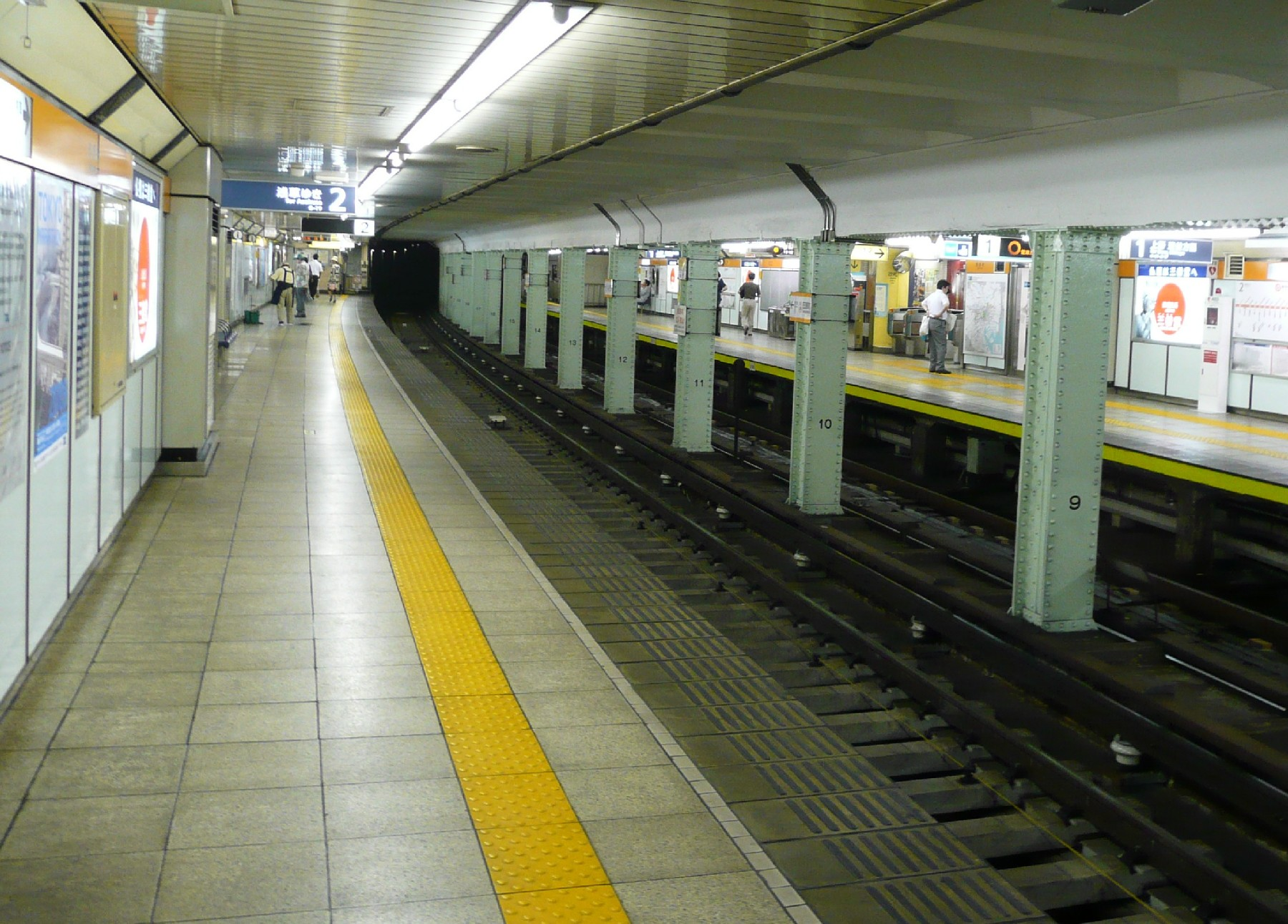
The platforms in July 2008, with platform 2 on the left and platform 1 on the right

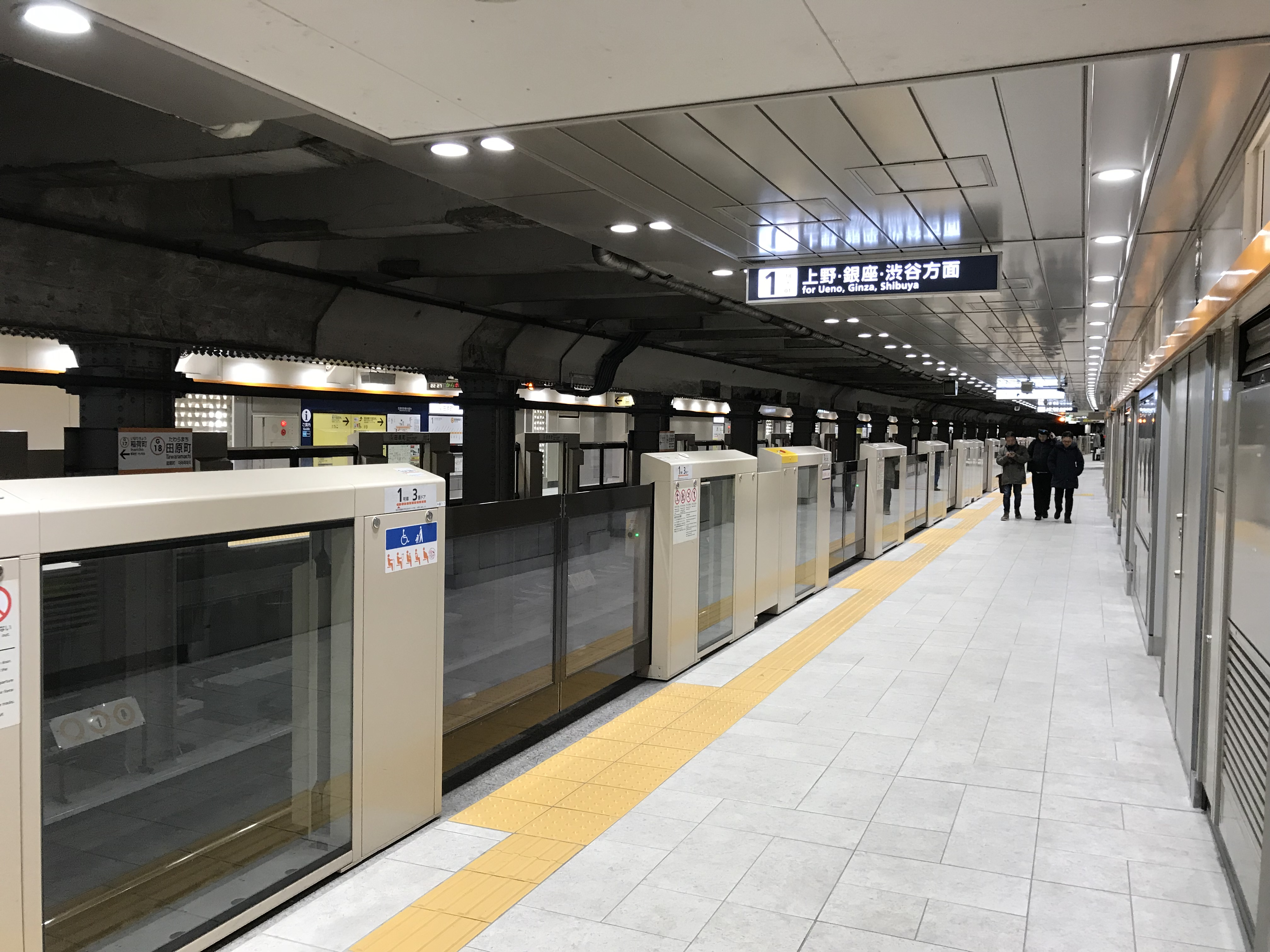
The Platforms after renewal in January 2018

== History ==
The Tokyo Underground Railway Tawaramachi Station is part of the first section of underground railway line in Asia, opened on 30 December 1927.

The station facilities were inherited by Tokyo Metro after the privatization of the Teito Rapid Transit Authority (TRTA) in 2004.

== Passenger statistics ==
In fiscal 2011, the station was used by an average of 26,216 passengers daily.

== See also ==
- List of railway stations in Japan
