= Inari-machi Station (Hiroshima) =

Railway station in Hiroshima, Japan

Coordinates: 34°23′34″N 132°28′16″E

Inari-machi 稲荷町
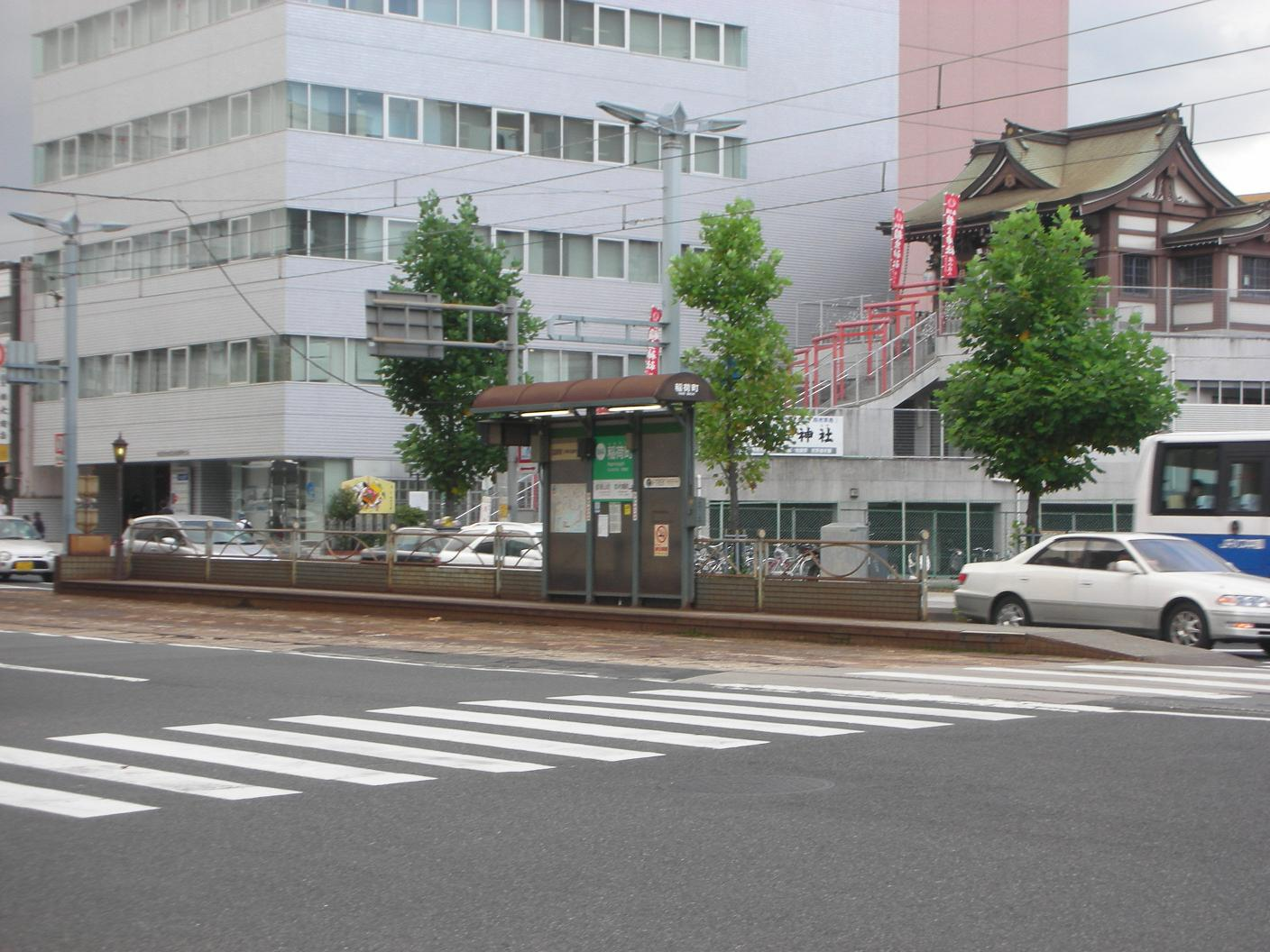

General information
- Location: Inari-machi, Minami-ku, Hiroshima; Japan
- Operator: Hiroshima Electric Railway
- Lines: █ Hiroden Main Line █ Hijiyama Line; Route

Other information
- Station code: M02

History
- Opened: November 23, 1912
Location

Inari-machi is a Hiroden station (tram stop) on Hiroden Main Line, located in Inari-machi, Minami-ku, Hiroshima.

== Routes ==
From Inari-machi Station, there are three of Hiroden Streetcar routes.

- Hiroshima Station - Hiroshima Port Route
- Hiroshima Station - Hiroden-miyajima-guchi Route
- Hiroshima Station - (via Hijiyama-shita) - Hiroshima Port Route
- Hiroshima Station - Eba Route

== Connections ==
█ Main Line

Hiroshima — Inari-machi — Kanayama-cho

█ Hijiyama Line

Hiroshima — Inari-machi — Matsukawa-cho

█ Circular Route (Tentative)

Matoba-cho — Inari-machi — Kanayama-cho

== Around station ==
- Inari Shrine
- Hiroshima Fashion Business Speciality College

== History ==
- Opened on November 23, 1912.
- Moved to the current place in 1950.

== See also ==
- Hiroden lines and routes
