= Minami-ku, Hiroshima =

Minami-ku 南区
- Ward of Hiroshima
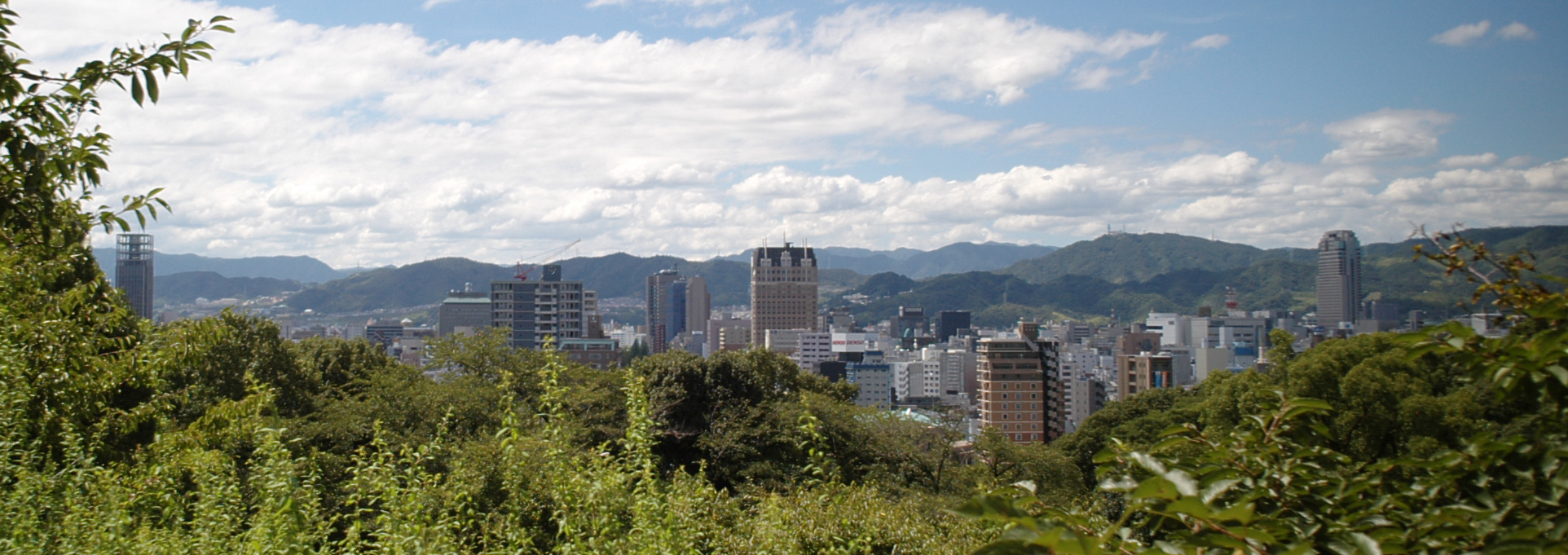
- View of Hiroshima City from Mount Hiji

- Flag Seal

- Location of Minami-ku in Hiroshima City

- Location within Japan
- Coordinates: 34°22′46″N 132°28′15″E
- Country: Japan
- Region: Chūgoku (Sanyo)
- Prefecture: Hiroshima
- City: Hiroshima

Area
  - Total: 26.09 km^{2} (10.07 sq mi)

Population (March 1, 2012)
  - Total: 138,471
  - Density: 5,307.44/km^{2} (13,746.2/sq mi)
- Time zone: UTC+9 (Japan Standard Time)
- Postal Number: 734-8522
- Address: Minami-cho 1-5-44, Naka-ku, Hiroshima City, Hiroshima Prefecture (広島県広島市皆実町1丁目5番44号)
- Telephone Number: 81-(0)82-245-2111
- Website: Official site

Minami-ku (南区) is one of the eight wards of the city of Hiroshima, Japan. As of March 1, 2012, the ward had an estimated population of 138,471, with 66,706 households and a population density of 5,307.44 persons per km^{2}. The total area was 26.09 km^{2}.

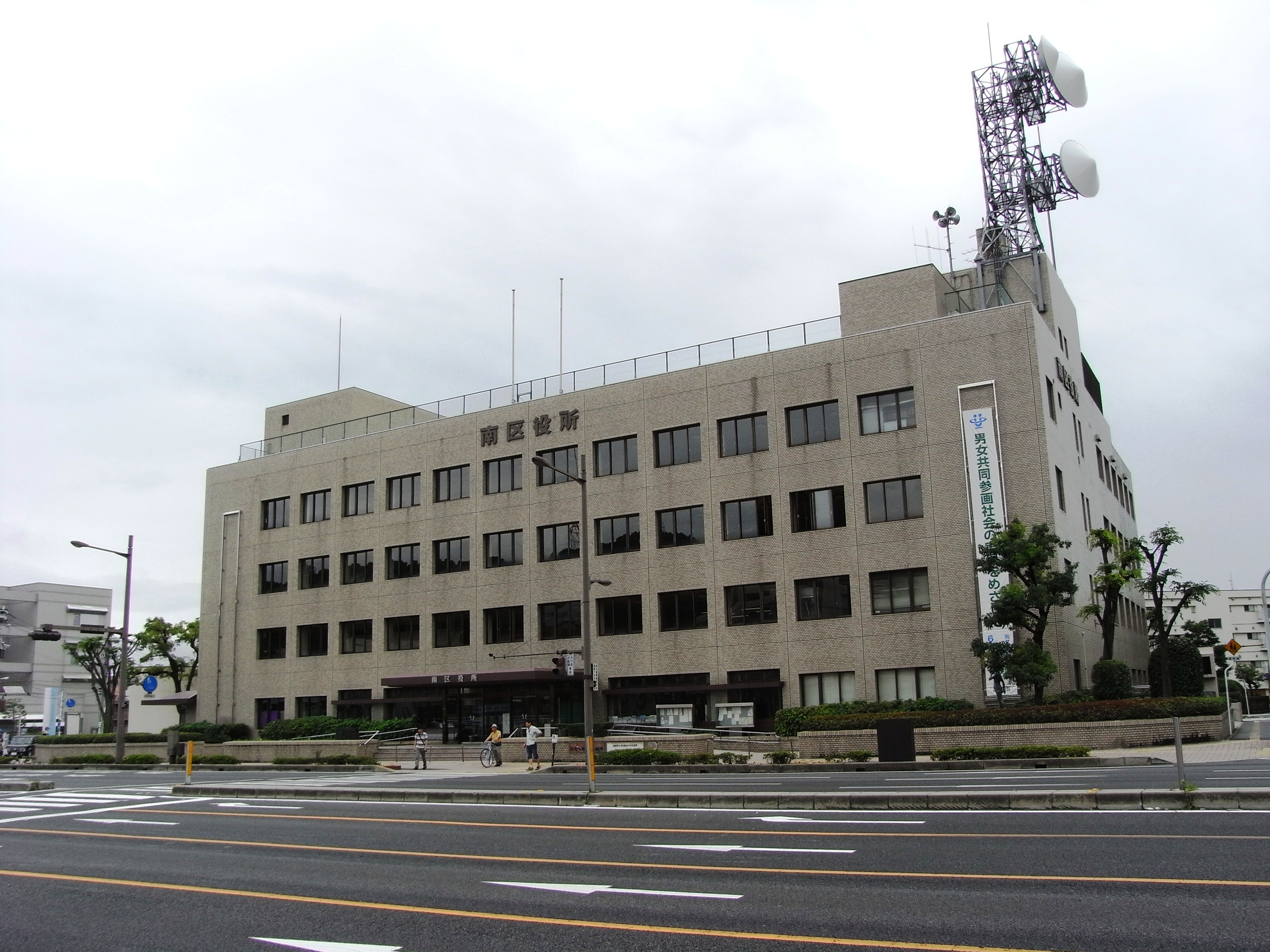
Minami Ward Office

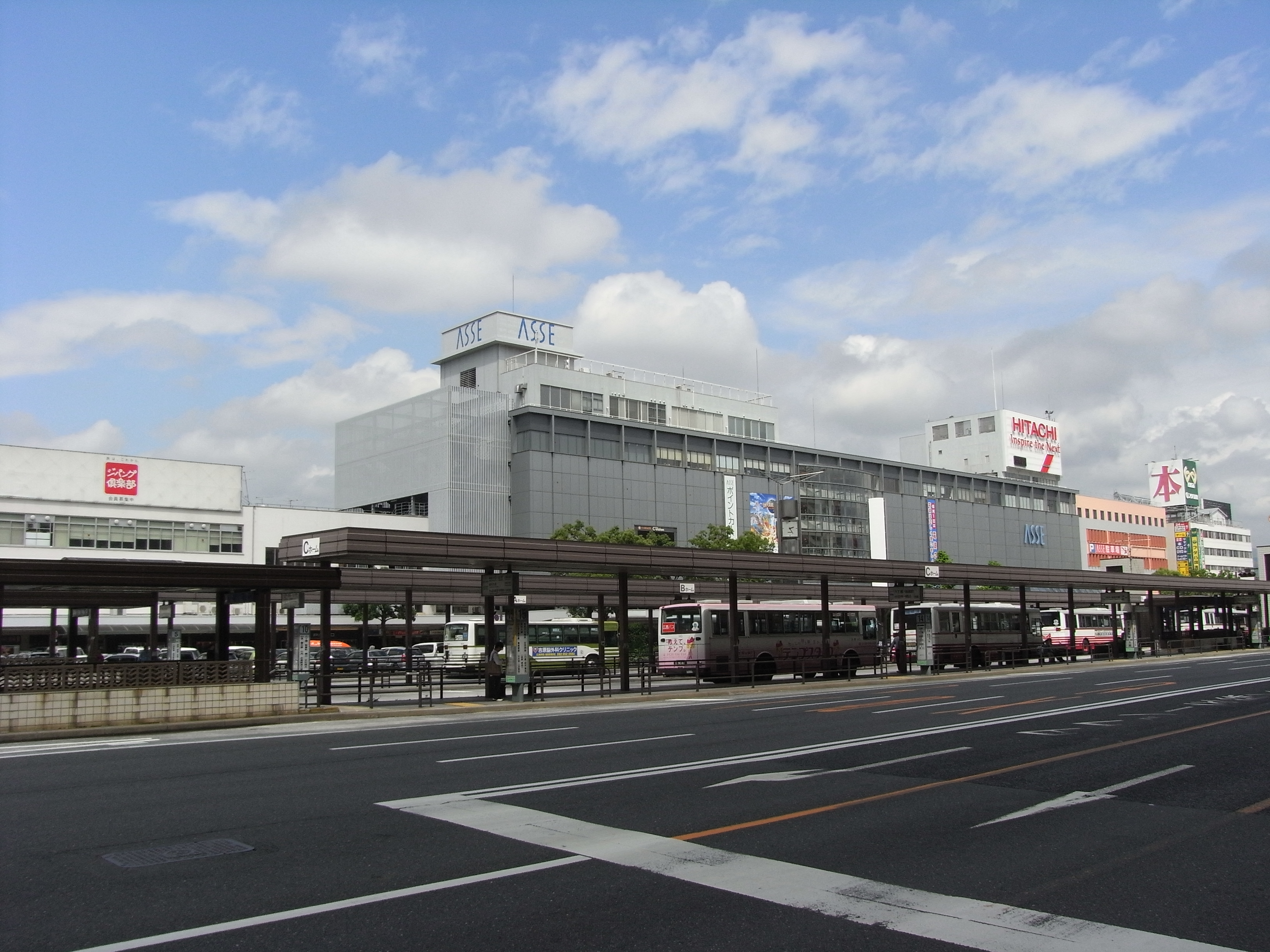
Hiroshima Station

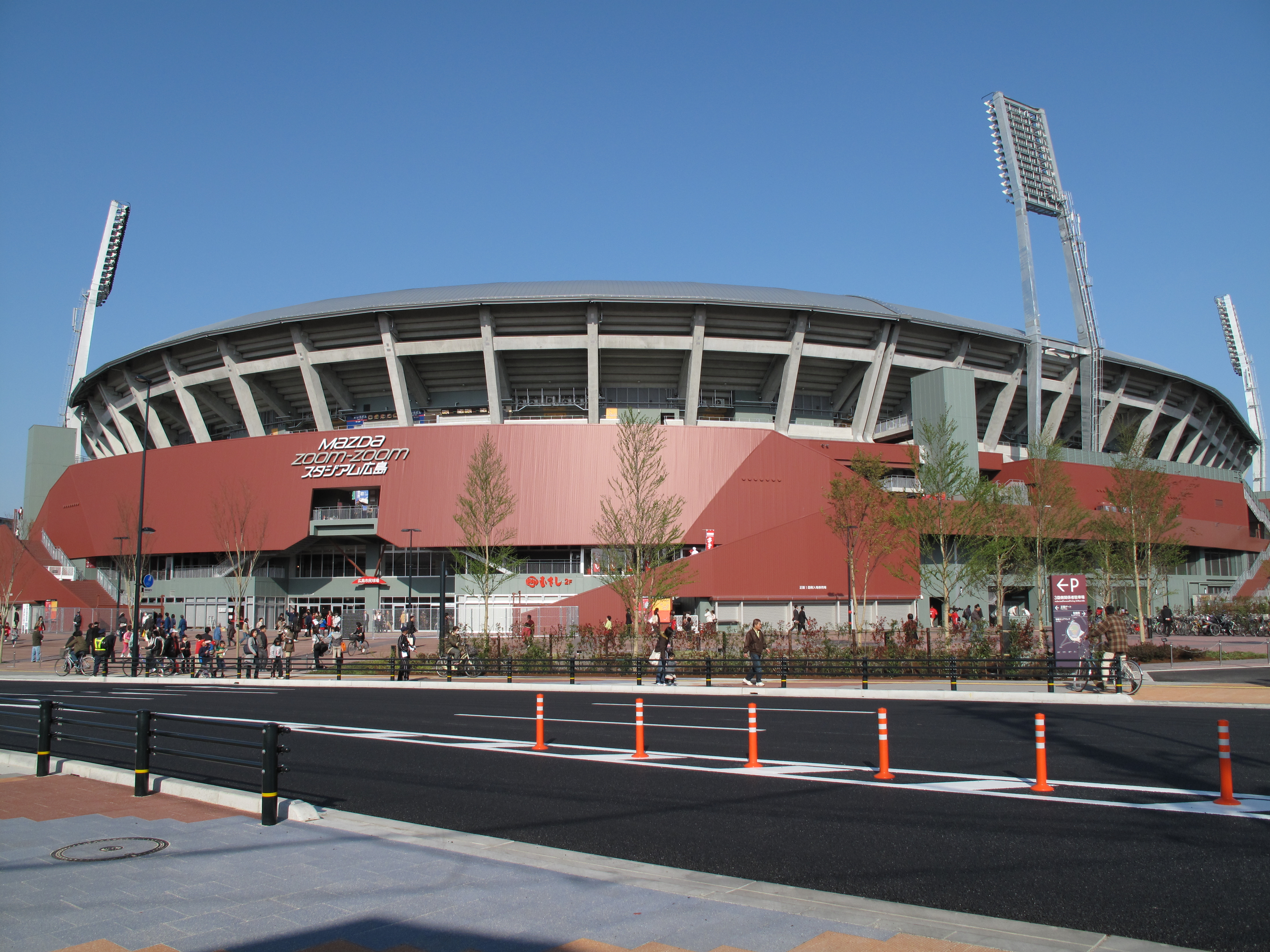
Mazda Zoom-Zoom Stadium Hiroshima
