= Tenmacho Station =

Tenmacho Station can refer to:

- Temma-chō Station: an underground metro station in Nagoya, Japan
- Tenma-cho Station: a tram stop in Hiroshima, Japan
