= Funairi-kawaguchi-cho Station =

Tram stop in Hiroshima, Japan

Funairi-kawaguchi-cho Station 舟入川口町
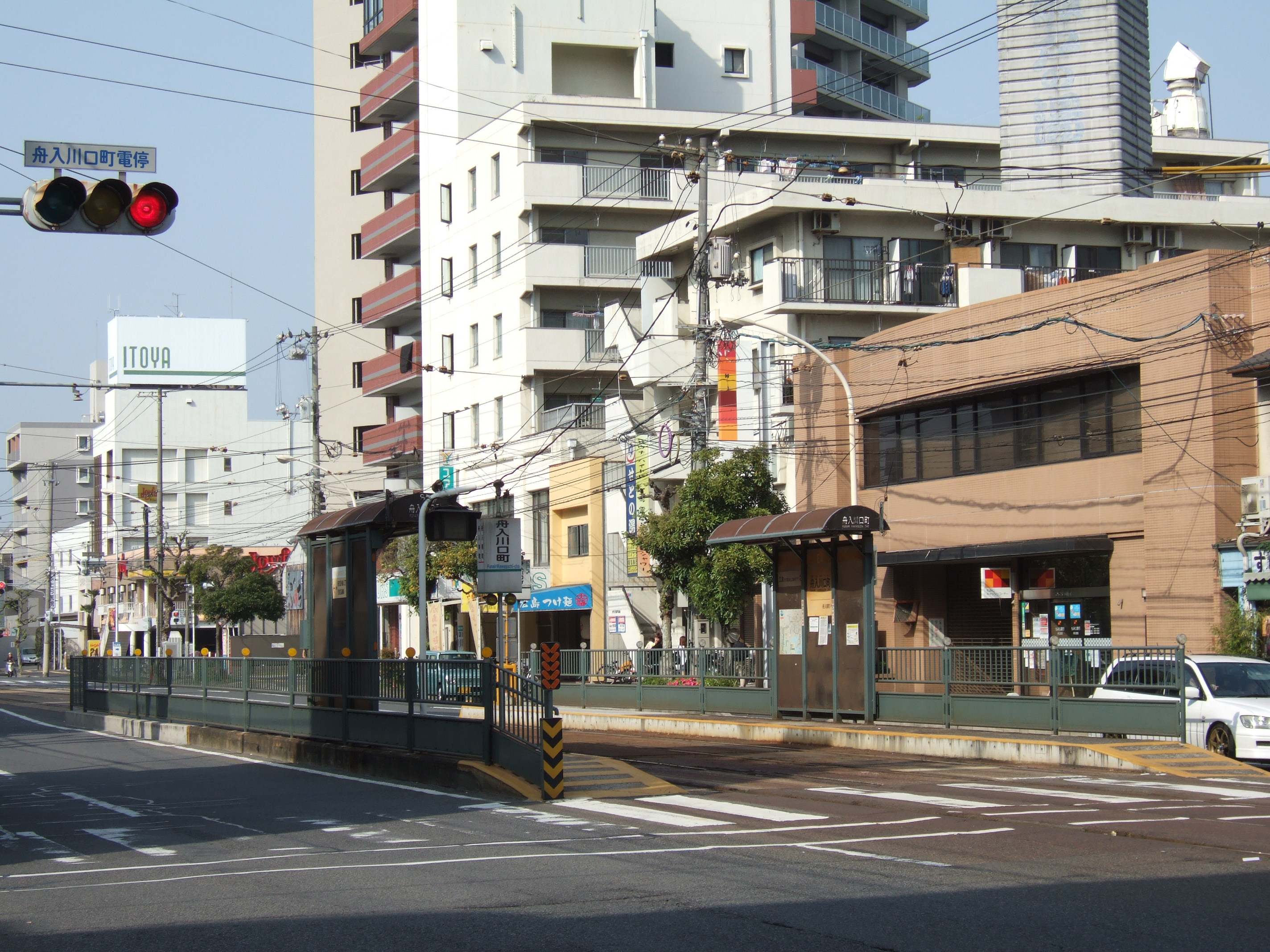

General information
- Location: Nishi-kawaguchi-cho, Naka-ku, Hiroshima; Japan
- Coordinates: 34.3804°N 132.4395°E
- Operator: Hiroshima Electric Railway
- Lines: Hiroden Eba Line; Route 6 8 9
- Platforms: 2 side platforms

Other information
- Station code: E4

History
- Opened: June 20, 1944
Location

Funairi-kawaguchi-cho is a Hiroden station on the Hiroden Eba Line located in Nishi-kawaguchi-cho, Naka-ku, Hiroshima. It is operated by the Hiroshima Electric Railway.

== Routes ==
There are three routes that serve Funairi-kawaguchi-cho Station:

- 6 Hiroshima Station - Eba Route
- 8 Yokogawa Station - Eba Route
- 9 Hakushima - Eba Route

== Station layout ==
The station consists of two side platforms serving two tracks. Crosswalks connect the platforms with the sidewalk. There is a shelter located in the middle of each platform.

== Adjacent stations ==
«	Service	»
Hiroden Eba Line
Funairi-saiwai-cho	Route 6	Funairi-minami-machi
Funairi-saiwai-cho	Route 8	Funairi-minami-machi
Funairi-saiwai-cho	Route 9	Funairi-minami-machi

== Bus connections ==
- Hiroden Bus Route #6 at Funairi-kawaguchi-cho bus stop

== Surrounding area ==
- Hiroshima Municipal Funairi High School
- Hiroshima City Funairi Elementary School

== History ==
- Opened on June 20, 1944.
- Service was stopped on February 1, 1945.
- Reopened on December 1, 1947.

== See also ==
- Hiroden lines and routes
