= Funairi-machi Station =

Tram stop in Hiroshima, Japan

Funairi-machi Station 舟入町駅
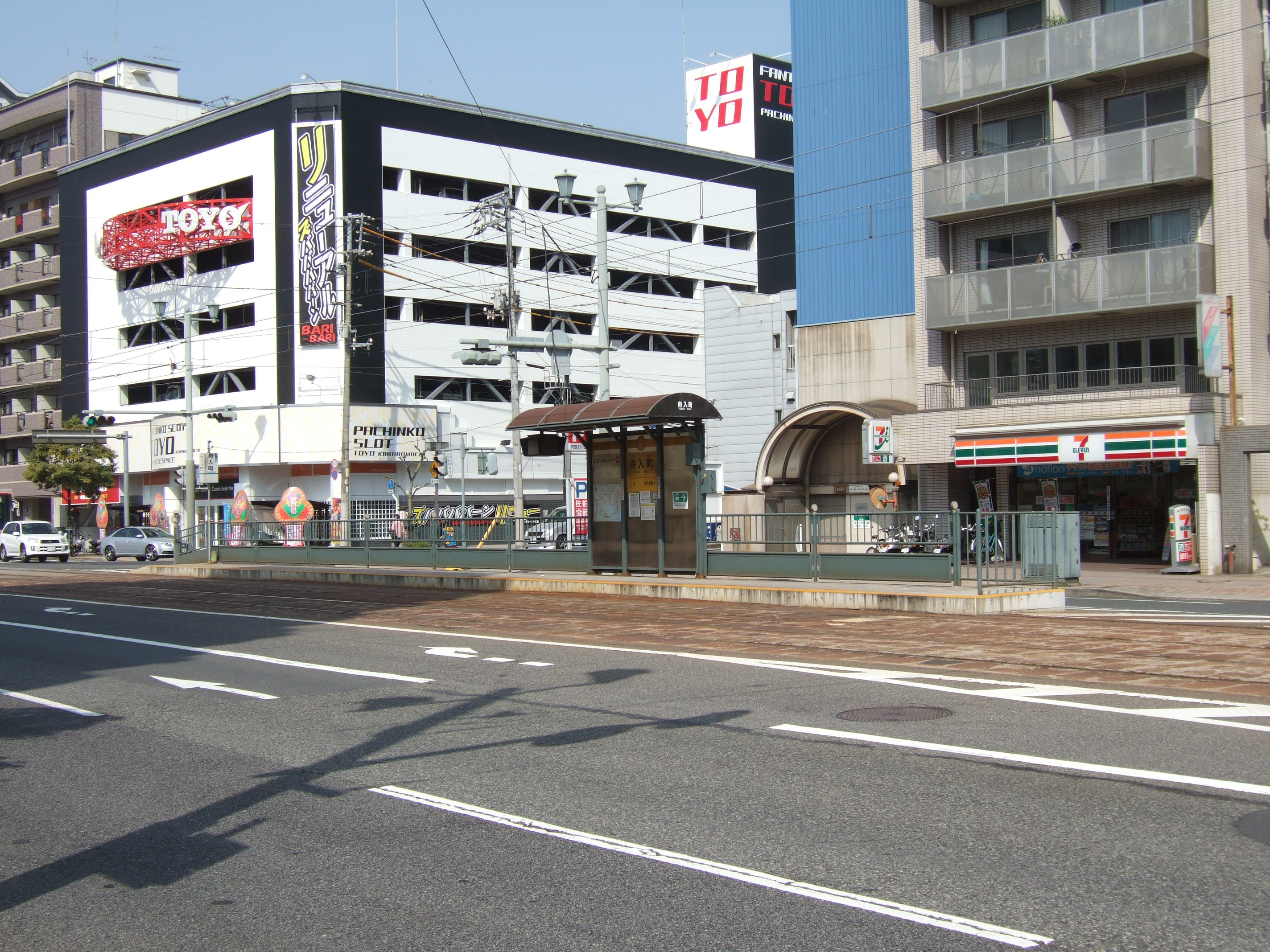

General information
- Location: Funairi-machi, Naka-ku, Hiroshima; Japan
- Coordinates: 34.3890°N 132.4449°E
- Operator: Hiroshima Electric Railway
- Lines: Hiroden Eba Line; Route 6 8 9
- Platforms: 2 side platforms

Other information
- Station code: E1

History
- Opened: December 28, 1943
Location

Funairi-machi is a Hiroden station on the Hiroden Eba Line located in Funairi-machi, Naka-ku, Hiroshima. It is operated by the Hiroshima Electric Railway.

== Routes ==
There are three routes that serve Funairi-machi Station:

- 6 Hiroshima Station - Eba Route
- 8 Yokogawa Station - Eba Route
- 9 Hakushima - Eba Route

== Station layout ==
The station consists of two staggered side platforms serving two tracks. Crosswalks connect the platforms with the sidewalk. There is a shelter located in the middle of each platform.

== Adjacent stations ==
«	Service	»
Hiroden Eba Line
Dobashi	Route 6	Funairi-hon-machi
Dobashi	Route 8	Funairi-hon-machi
Dobashi	Route 9	Funairi-hon-machi

== Surrounding area ==
- Wel City, Hiroshima - Hiroshima Kosei Nenkin Kaikan
- Aster Plaza
- Municipal Kanzaki Elementary School in Hiroshima

== History ==
- Opened on December 28, 1943.
