= Dobashi Station (Hiroshima) =

Tram stop in Hiroshima, Japan

Dobashi 土橋
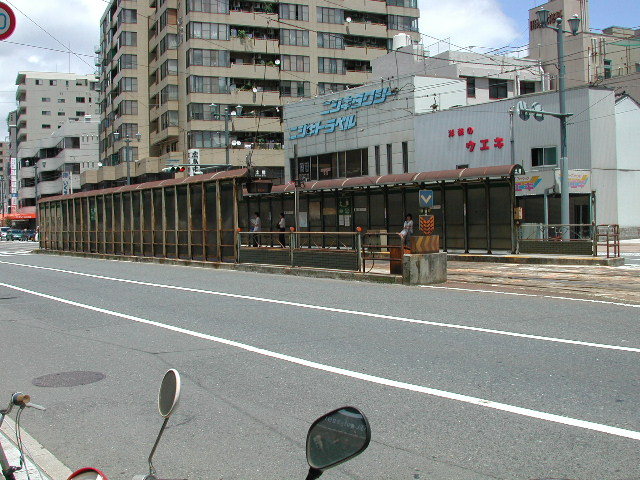

General information
- Location: Sakai-machi 2-chome, Naka-ku, Hiroshima; Japan
- Coordinates: 34°23′40″N 132°26′47″E
- Operator: Hiroshima Electric Railway
- Lines: Hiroden Main Line; Hiroden Eba Line; Route 2 3 6 8 9
- Platforms: 2 side platforms

Other information
- Station code: M13

History
- Opened: December 8, 1912
Location

Dobashi is a Hiroden station on the Hiroden Main Line and Hiroden Eba Line, located in Sakai-machi, Naka-ku, Hiroshima. It is operated by the Hiroshima Electric Railway.

== Routes ==
There are five routes that serve Dobashi Station:

- 2 Hiroshima Station - Hiroden-miyajima-guchi Route
- 3 Hiroden-nishi-hiroshima - Hiroshima Port Route
- 6 Hiroshima Station - Eba Route
- 8 Yokogawa Station - Eba Route
- 9 Hakushima - Eba Route

== Station layout ==
The station consists of two side platforms serving two tracks. Access to the platforms is via a crosswalk. South of the station, the Main Line turns right, while the Eba Line separates from the Main Line and continues straight.

== Adjacent stations ==
«	Service	»
Hiroden Main Line
Tokaichi-machi	Route 2	Koami-cho
Tokaichi-machi	Route 3	Koami-cho
Hiroden Eba Line
Tokaichi-machi (Main Line)	Route 6	Funairi-machi
Tokaichi-machi (Main Line)	Route 8	Funairi-machi
Tokaichi-machi (Main Line)	Route 9	Funairi-machi

== Surrounding area ==
- Chugoku Shimbun head office
- Hiroshima Peace Memorial Park
- Musubi-Musashi Dobashi

== History ==
- Opened on December 8, 1912.

== See also ==
- Hiroden lines and routes
