= Kanon-machi Station =

Tram stop in Hiroshima, Japan

Coordinates: 34°23′44″N 132°26′19″E

Kanon-machi 観音町
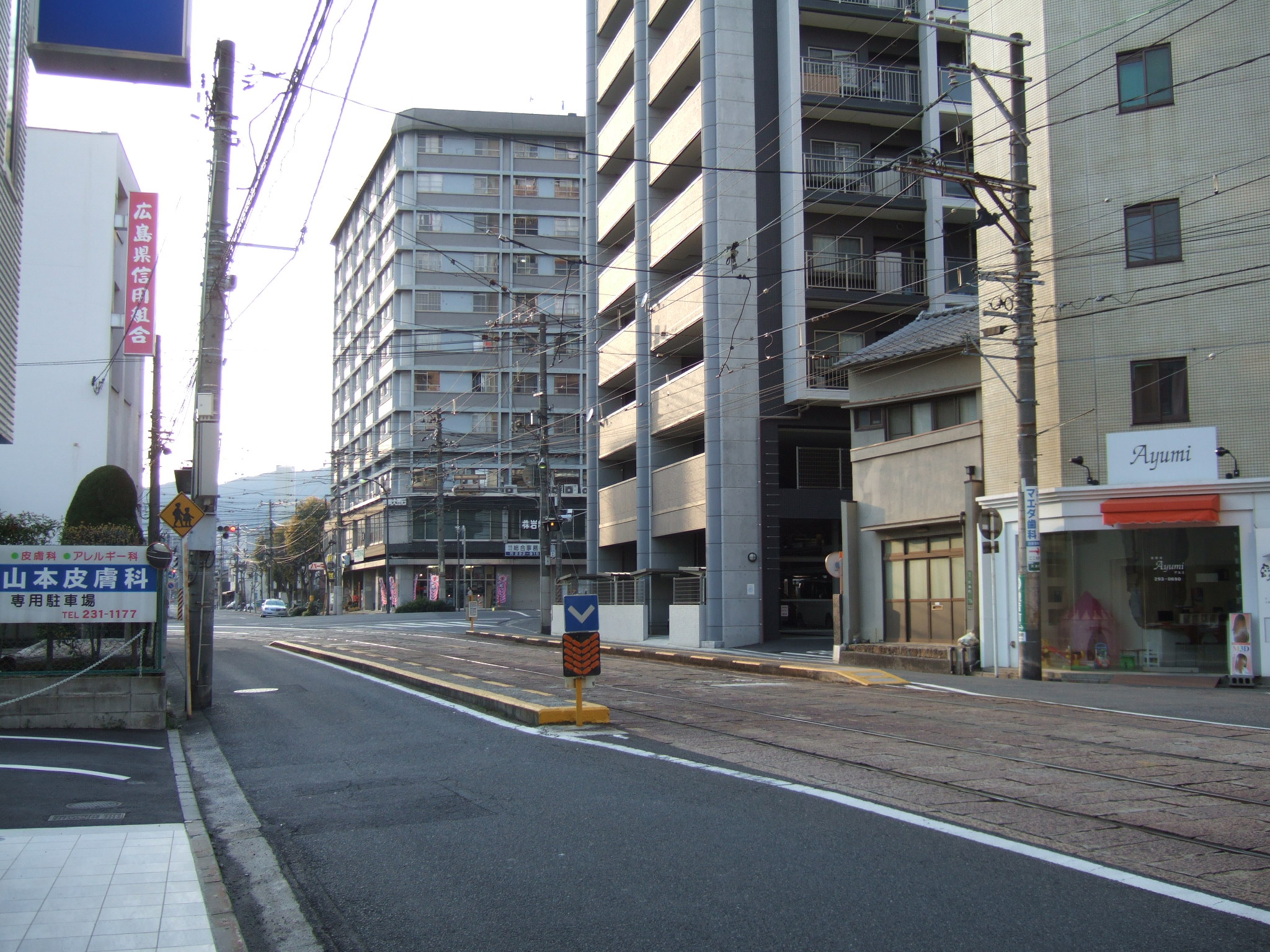

General information
- Location: Kanon-machi, Nishi-ku, Hiroshima; Japan
- Operator: Hiroshima Electric Railway
- Lines: █ Hiroden Main Line; Route

Other information
- Station code: M16

History
- Opened: 1926
Location

Kanon-machi Station (観音町駅, Kan'onmachi-eki) is a tram stop on the Hiroden Main Line, located in kan'on-machi, Nishi-ku, Hiroshima, Japan.

== Routes ==
From Kanon-machi Station, there are two of Hiroden Streetcar routes.

- Hiroshima Station - Hiroden-miyajima-guchi Route
- Hiroden-nishi-hiroshima - Hiroshima Port Route

== Connections ==
█ Main Line

Tenma-cho — Kanon-machi — Nishi-kanon-machi

== Around station ==
- Peace Boulevard
- Hiroshima-Nishi Post office

== History ==
- Opened as "Kanon-machi" in 1926.
- Closed in May 1942.
- Reopened as "Nishi-Tenma-cho" on September 1, 1964.
- Renamed as "Kanon-machi" on April 1, 1965.

== See also ==
- Hiroden lines and routes
