= Funairi-saiwai-cho Station =

Tram stop in Hiroshima, Japan

Funairi-saiwai-cho Station 舟入幸町
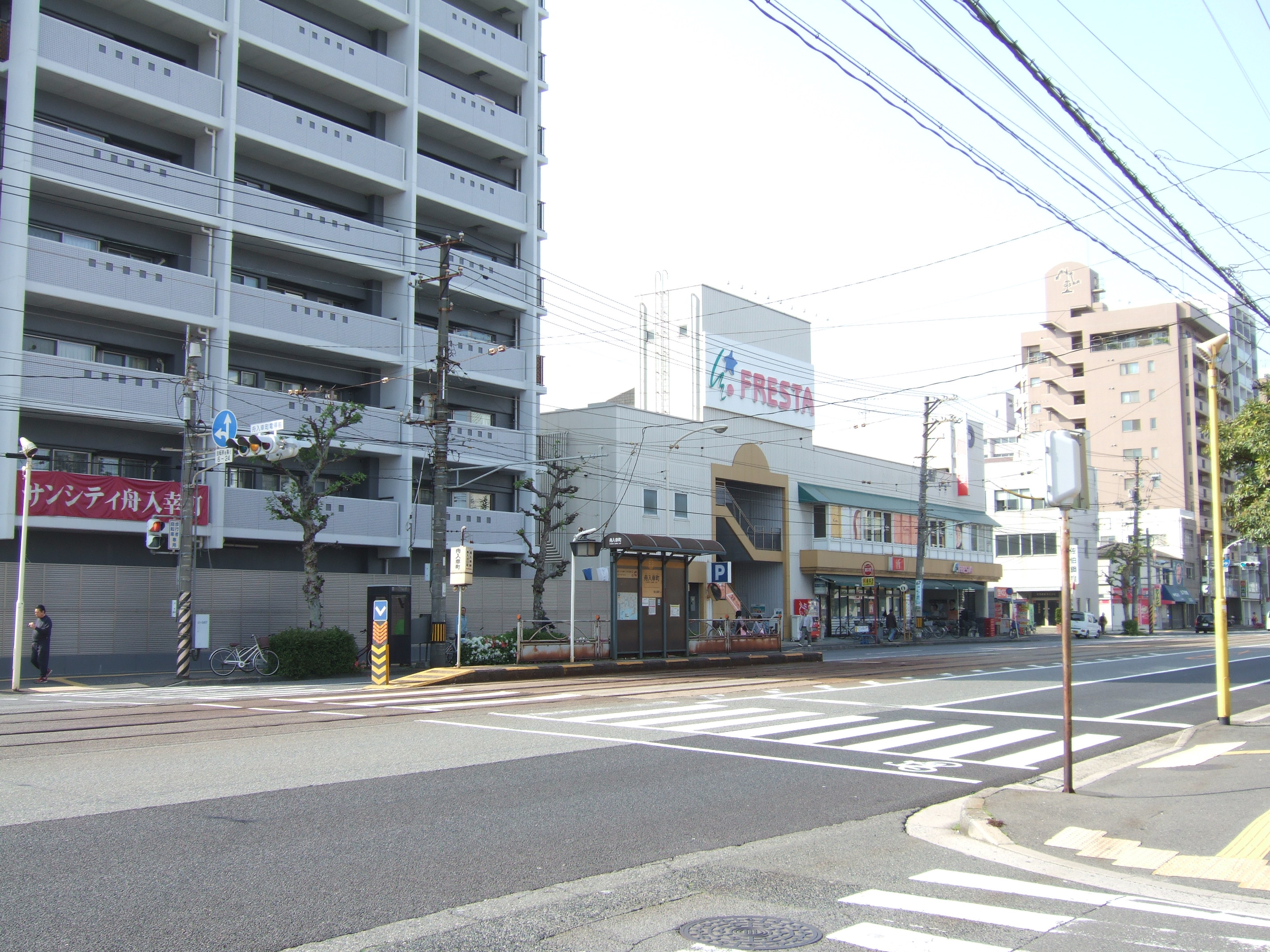

General information
- Location: Funairi-saiwai-cho, Naka-ku, Hiroshima; Japan
- Coordinates: 34.3834°N 132.4409°E
- Operator: Hiroshima Electric Railway
- Lines: Hiroden Eba Line; Route 6 8 9

Other information
- Station code: E3

History
- Opened: November 1, 1959
Location

Funairi-saiwai-cho is a Hiroden station on the Hiroden Eba Line located in Funairi-saiwai-cho, Naka-ku, Hiroshima. It is operated by the Hiroshima Electric Railway.

== Routes ==
There are three routes that serve Funairi-saiwai-cho Station:

- 6 Hiroshima Station - Eba Route
- 8 Yokogawa Station - Eba Route
- 9 Hakushima - Eba Route

== Station layout ==
The station consists of two staggered side platforms serving two tracks. Crosswalks connect the platforms with the sidewalk. There is a shelter located in the middle of each platform.

== Adjacent stations ==
«	Service	»
Hiroden Eba Line
Funairi-hon-machi	Route 6	Funairi-kawaguchi-cho
Funairi-hon-machi	Route 8	Funairi-kawaguchi-cho
Funairi-hon-machi	Route 9	Funairi-kawaguchi-cho

== Bus connections ==
- Hiroden Bus Route #6 at Funairi-saiwai-cho bus stop

== History ==
- Opened on November 1, 1959.

== See also ==
- Hiroden lines and routes
