= Nishi-kanon-machi Station =

Tram stop in Hiroshima, Japan

Coordinates: 34.3940°N 132.4371°E

Nishi-kanon-machi 西観音町
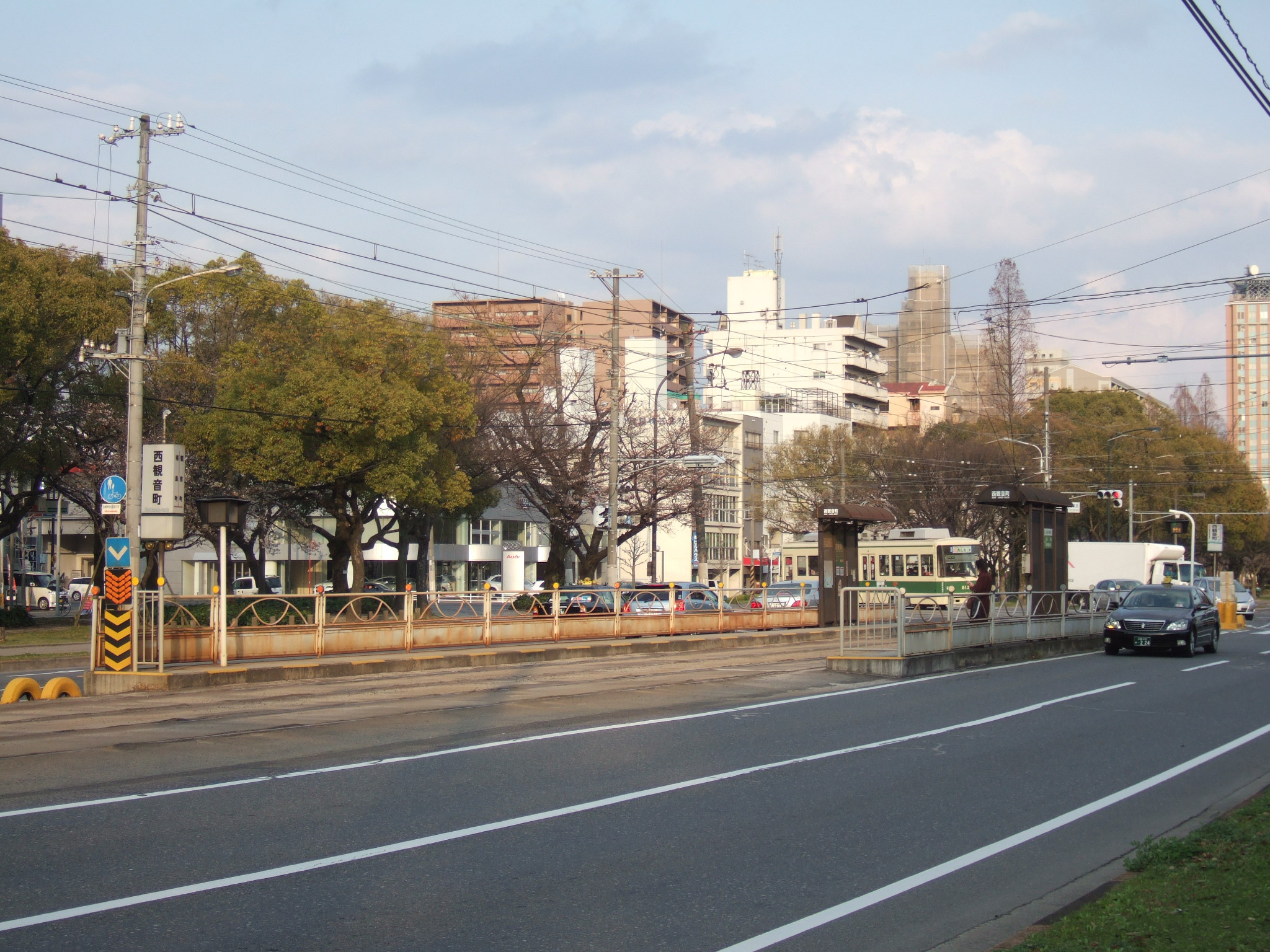

General information
- Location: Nishi-kanon-machi, Nishi-ku, Hiroshima; Japan
- Operator: Hiroshima Electric Railway
- Lines: █ Hiroden Main Line; Route

Other information
- Station code: M17

History
- Opened: February 10, 1960
Location

Nishi-kanon-machi Station (西観音町駅, Nishi Kan'onmachi-eki) is a tram stop on the Hiroden Main Line located in Nishi-kan'on-machi, Nishi-ku, Hiroshima, Japan.

== Routes ==
From Nishi-kanon-machi Station, there are two of Hiroden Streetcar routes.

- Hiroshima Station - Hiroden-miyajima-guchi Route
- Hiroden-nishi-hiroshima - Hiroshima Port Route

== Connections ==
█ Main Line

Kanon-machi — Nishi-kanon-machi — Fukushima-cho

== Around station ==
- Peace Boulevard

== History ==
- Opened as "Fukushima-Byōin-mae" on February 10, 1960.
- Renamed as "Miyako-chō" on February 12, 1962.
- Renamed as "Nishi-kanon-machi" on September 1, 1964.

== See also ==
- Hiroden lines and routes
