= Tenma-cho Station =

Tram stop in Hiroshima, Japan

Coordinates: 34.3952°N 132.4408°E

Tenma-cho 天満町
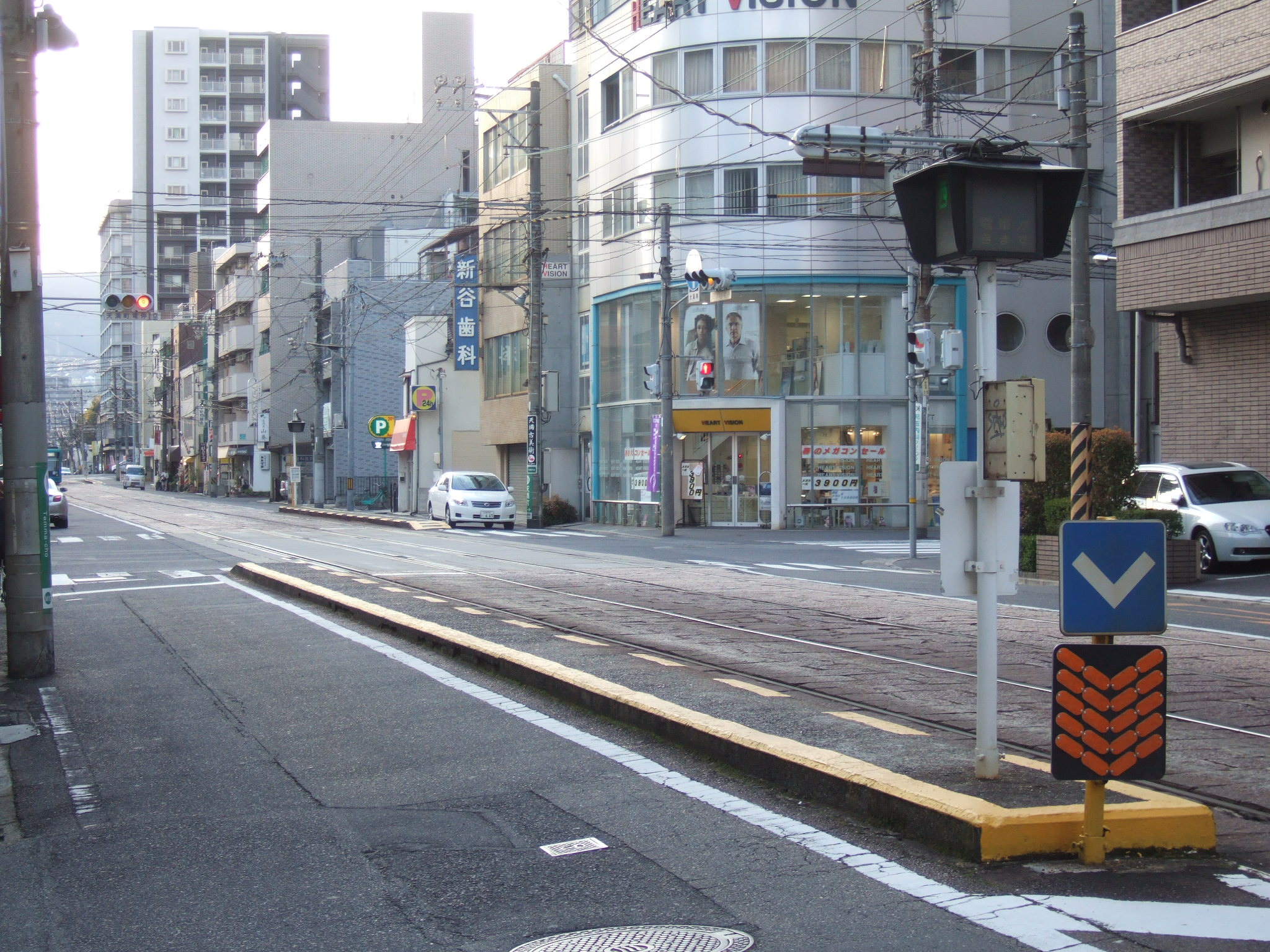

General information
- Location: Kanon-machi, Nishi-ku, Hiroshima; Japan
- Operator: Hiroshima Electric Railway
- Lines: █ Hiroden Main Line; Route

Other information
- Station code: M15
Location

Tenma-cho is a Hiroden station (tram stop) on Hiroden Main Line, located in Kanon-machi, Nishi-ku, Hiroshima.

== Routes ==
From Tenma-cho Station, there are two of Hiroden Streetcar routes.

- Hiroshima Station - Hiroden-miyajima-guchi Route
- Hiroden-nishi-hiroshima - Hiroshima Port Route

== Connections ==
█ Main Line

Koami-cho — Tenma-cho — Kanon-machi

== Around station ==
- Peace Boulevard

== History ==
The station opened on December 8, 1912

== See also ==
- Hiroden lines and routes
