= Koami-cho Station =

Railway station in Hiroshima, Japan

Coordinates: 34.3944°N 132.4444°E

Koami-cho 小網町
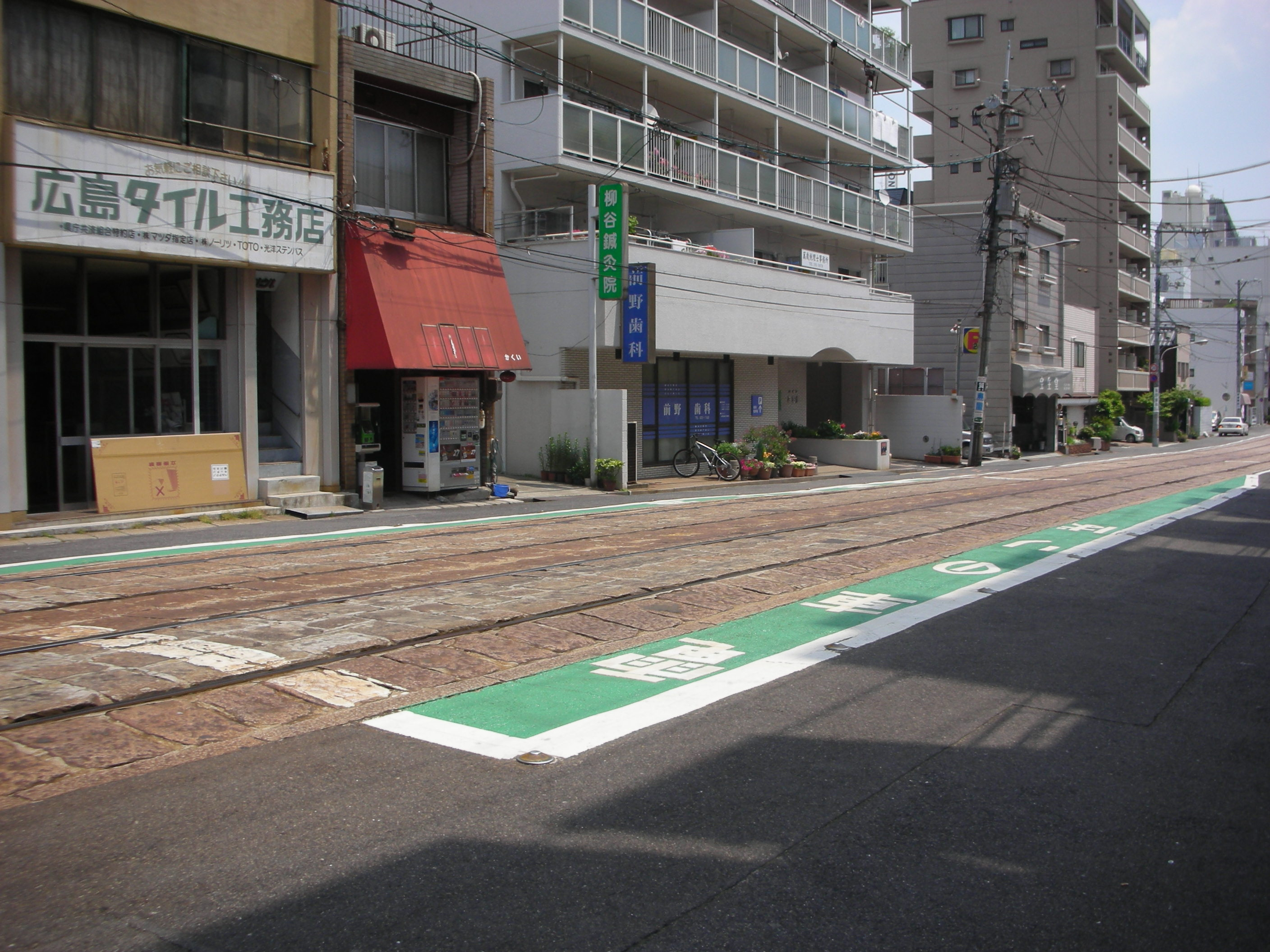

General information
- Location: Koami-cho, Naka-ku, Hiroshima; Japan
- Operator: Hiroshima Electric Railway
- Lines: █ Hiroden Main Line; Route

Other information
- Station code: M14

History
- Opened: December 8, 1911
Location

Koami-cho is a Hiroden station (tram stop) on Hiroden Main Line, located in Koami-cho, Naka-ku, Hiroshima. There are no platforms because of the narrow street.

== Routes ==
From Koami-cho Station, there are two of Hiroden Streetcar routes.

- Hiroshima Station - Hiroden-miyajima-guchi Route
- Hiroden-nishi-hiroshima - Hiroshima Port Route

== Connections ==
█ Main Line

Dobashi — Koami-cho — Tenma-cho

== Around station ==
- Peace Boulevard

== History ==
- Opened on December 8, 1911.
- Service was stopped on June 10, 1944.
- Service restarted on August 15, 1945.

== See also ==
- Hiroden lines and routes
