= Hiroden Eba Line =

Tram line in Hiroshima, Japan

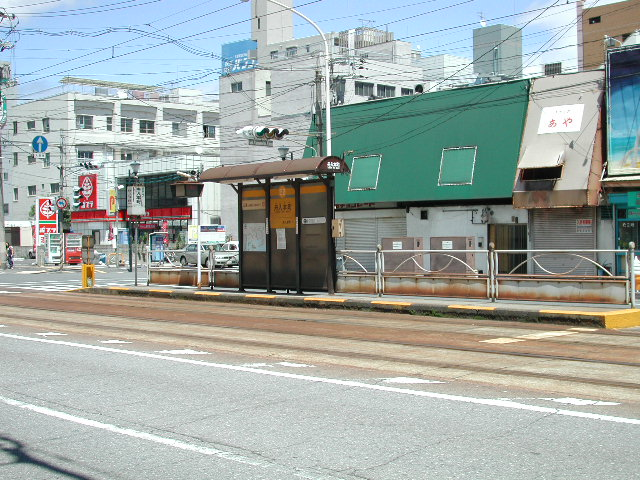
- Hiroshima Electric Railway Funairi-Honmachi Station

Overview
- Status: Operating
- Locale: Hiroshima, Japan
- Termini: Dobashi Station; Eba Station
- Stations: 7

Service
- Type: Tram
- System: Hiroden Streetcar
- Operator(s): Hiroshima Electric Railway

History
- Opened: 1943

Technical
- Line length: 2.7 km (1.7 mi)

The Eba Line (江波線, Eba-sen) is a streetcar line of Hiroshima Electric Railway (Hiroden) in Hiroshima, Japan. The line has been operating since 1943.

The total distance of the line is 2.6 kilometres (1.6 mi). Routes 6, 8, and 9 operate on the line. The line has seven stations, with six of them numbered E1 through E6. The seventh station, Dobashi, is numbered M13, and is the station where the Eba Line merges with the Hiroden Main Line.

== Stations ==
No.	Station	Routes	Connections
↑ Line merges onto Hiroden Main Line in the direction of Tokaichi-machi Station ↑
M12	Dobashi	2 3 6 8 9	Hiroden Main Line
E01	Funairi-machi	6 8 9	
E02	Funairi-hon-machi	6 8 9	
E03	Funairi-saiwai-cho	6 8 9	
E04	Funairi-kawaguchi-cho	6 8 9	
E05	Funairi-minami-machi	6 8 9	
E06	Eba	6 8 9	
