= Tram stop =

Place designated for a tram to stop so passengers can board or leave

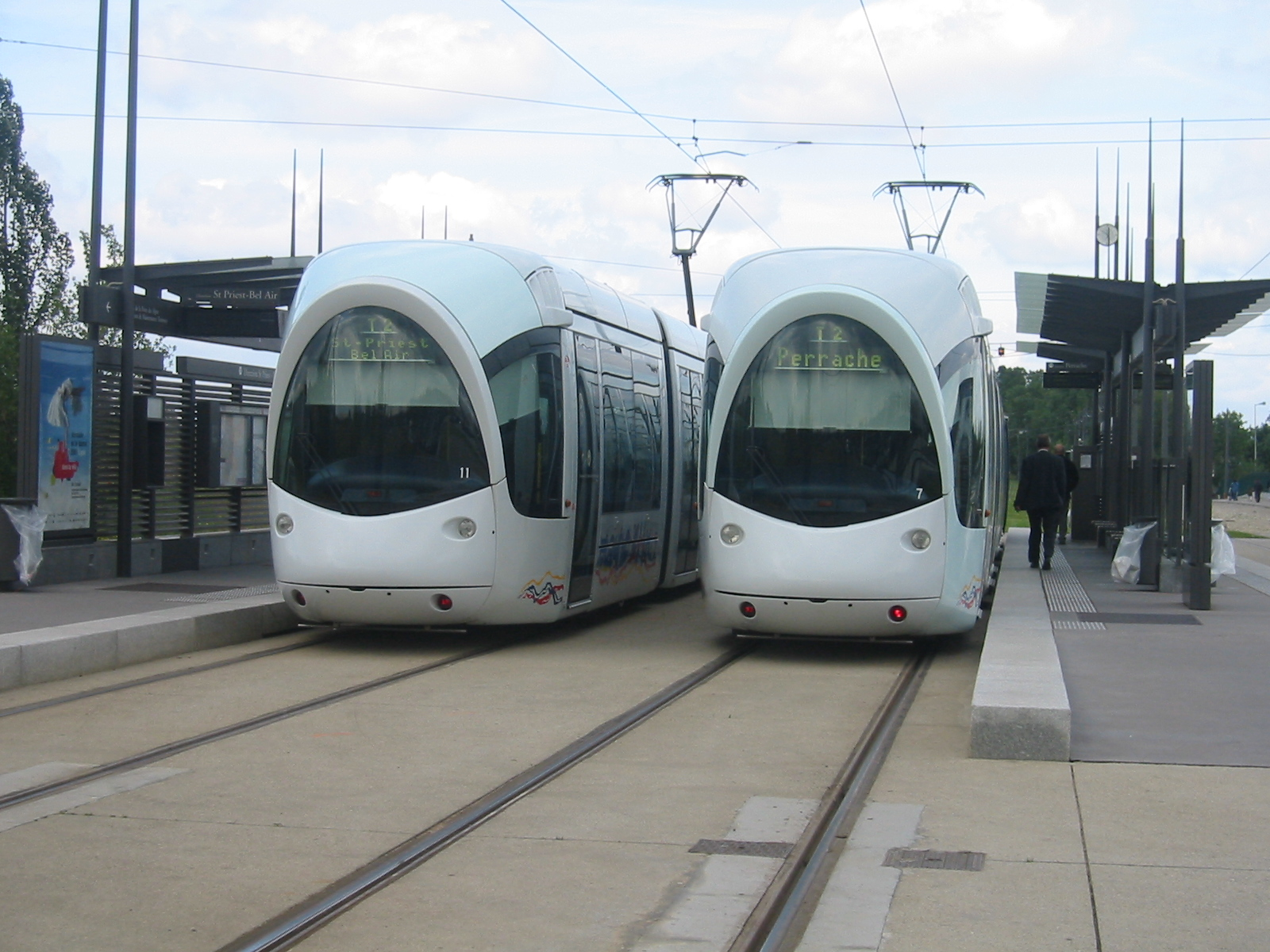
Tram stops can range from purpose-built, tram-exclusive infrastructure similar to conventional train stations (example in Lyon), ...

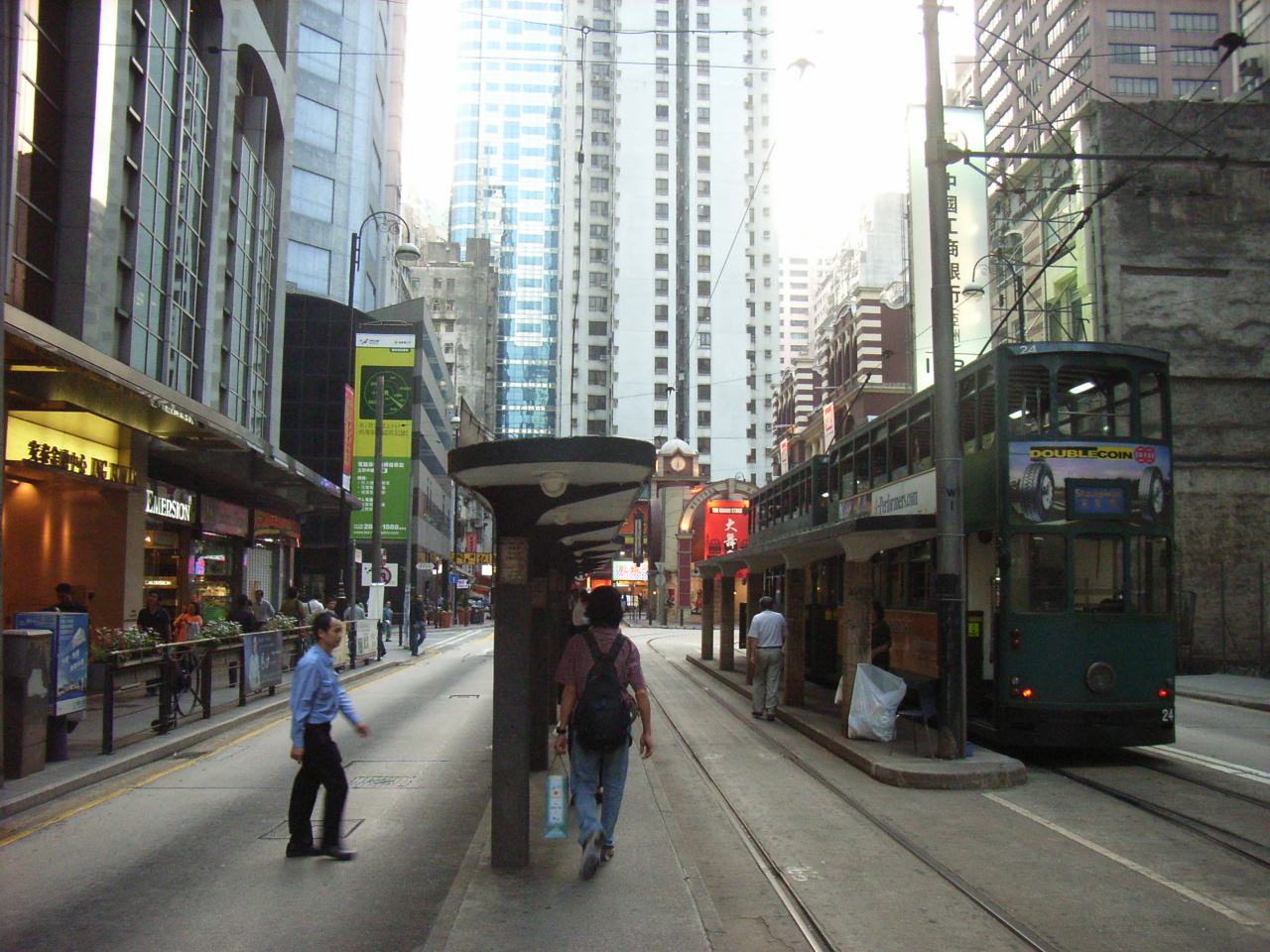
... to stops threaded into narrow urban environments (here in Hong Kong)...

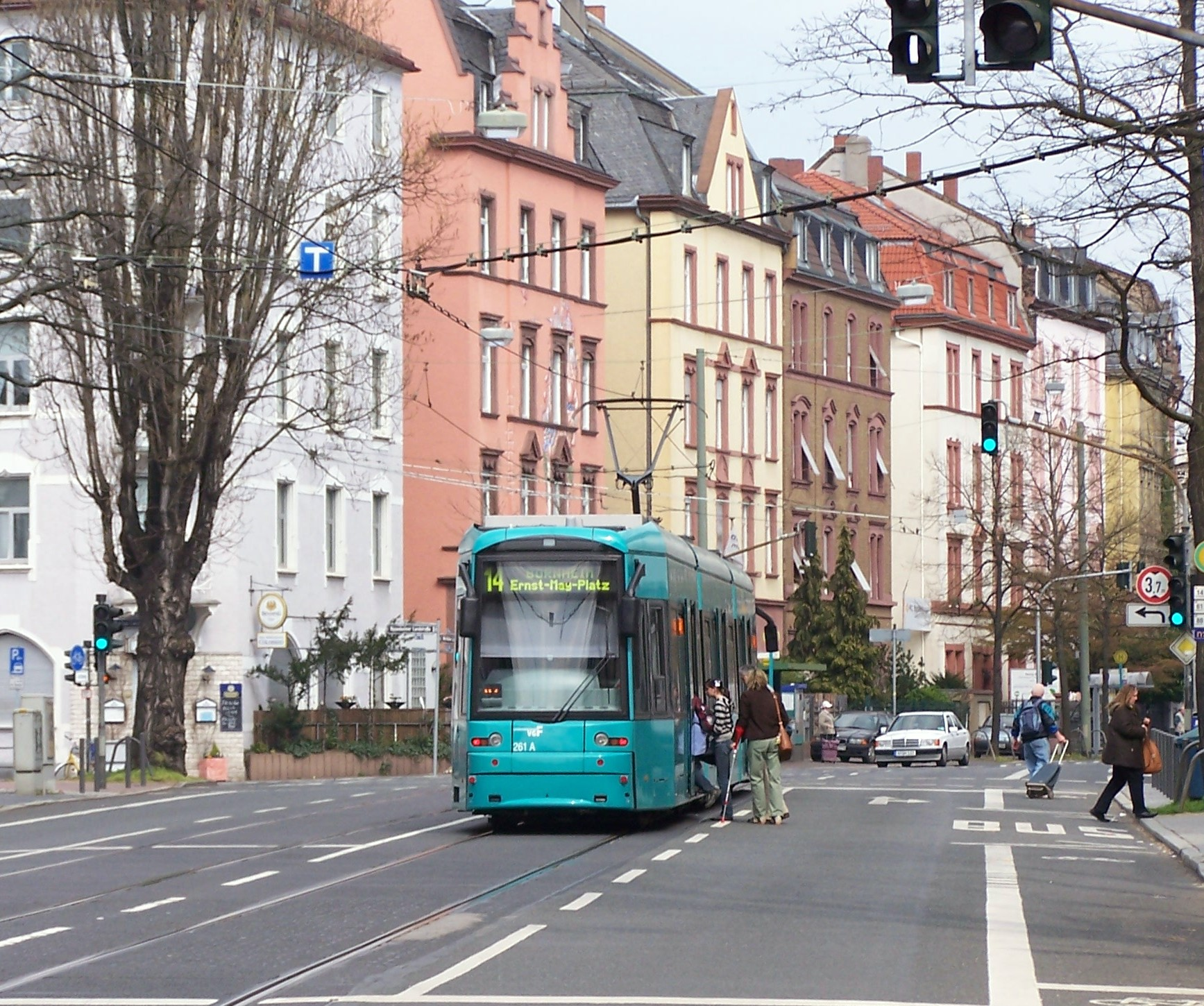
... to simple stops within a public road (here in Frankfurt am Main).

A tram stop, tram station, streetcar stop, or light rail station is a place designated for a tram, streetcar, or light rail vehicle to stop so passengers can board or alight it. Generally, tram stops share most characteristics of bus stops, but because trams operate on rails, they often include railway platforms, especially if stepless entries are provided for accessibility. However, trams may also be used with bus stop type flags and with mid-street pavements as platforms, in street running mode.

== Types of tram stops ==
=== Tram stops without platforms ===
Many tram or streetcar stops, especially on older tram lines street-running on narrower streets, have no dedicated platforms. Instead, stops are located in the middle of the roadway. Passengers need to cross lanes for motor vehicles to board or alight from trams.

Examples of systems with this type of stops include:

North America

- Toronto, ON, Canada: Most stops on all TTC streetcar routes except 509, 510, and 512
- San Francisco, CA, United States: Muni Metro Lines J, K, L, M, and N and cable cars
- Philadelphia, PA, United States: SEPTA Routes 11, 13, 14, 15, 34, 36, 101, and 102.
- Dallas, TX, United States: M-Line Trolley
- New Orleans, LA, United States: St. Charles Streetcar (in Central Business District)
- Boston, MA, United States: MBTA Green Line E Branch (3 stops)

Europe

- Berlin, Germany: Berlin Trams
- Frankfurt am Main, Germany: Frankfurt Trams
- Vienna, Austria: Vienna Trams
- Lisbon, Portugal: Lisbon Trams

Oceania

- Melbourne, VIC, Australia: Melbourne Trams (many stops outside CBD)

Asia

- Hiroshima, Japan: Hiroshima Electric Railway (Koami-cho station)
- Okayama, Japan: Okayama Electric Tramway (Chunagon and Kobashi stations)
- Takaoka, Japan: Manyosen Takaoka Kido Line (Kataharamachi, Yochihisa, Shin-Yoshihisa stations)
- Hong Kong SAR: Hong Kong Tramways (6 stops)
- Dalian, China: Dalian Tram Route 201
- Kolkata, India: Kolkata Tram

In most jurisdictions, to protect passengers' safety, at stops without a safety zone or designated platform, traffic cannot legally pass a tram or streetcar whose doors are open.

=== Tram stops with high-level platforms ===
Several light rail systems have high-platform stops or stations with dedicated platforms at railway platform height. Reasons for this include systems being created from former heavy rail routes (as in the case of the Metrolink system in Greater Manchester, England), or to provide a more rapid transit-like commuting experience (such as the Metro Rail system in Los Angeles, California). Such trams also stop at dedicated platform stops on Stadtbahn systems in Germany, especially in underground stations in city centres.

=== Tram stops with mixed-level platforms ===
Several tram stops have mixed platform heights for various reasons.

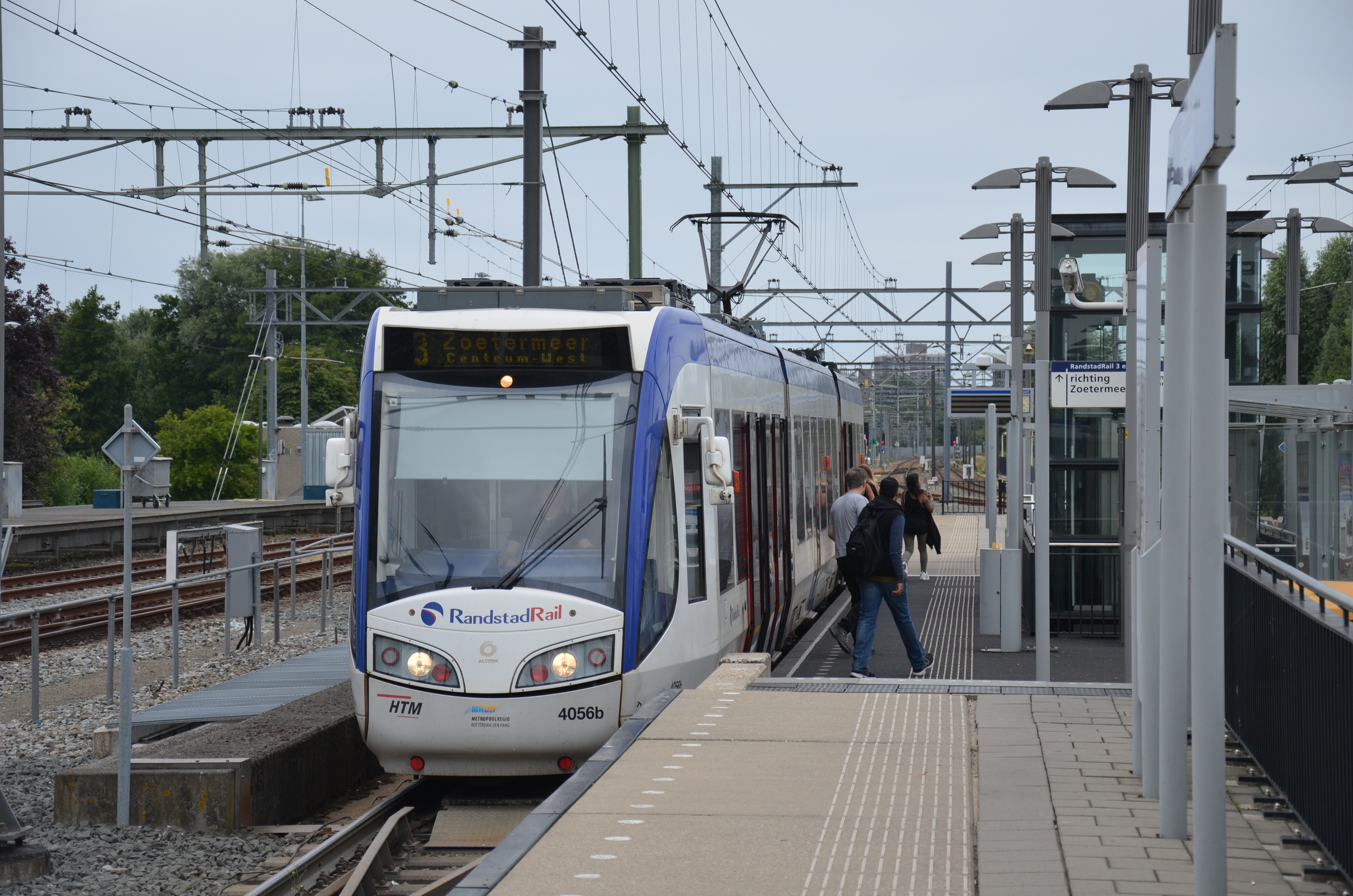
Photo taken from the high-level platform of Forepark Station, showing passengers boarding a tram from the low-level platform

In The Hague, Netherlands, on tram lines 3, 4, and 34, between Laan van NOI and Leidschenveen stops, platforms feature mixed heights to accommodate both the high-floor Rotterdam Metro line E and the low-floor standard tram vehicles.

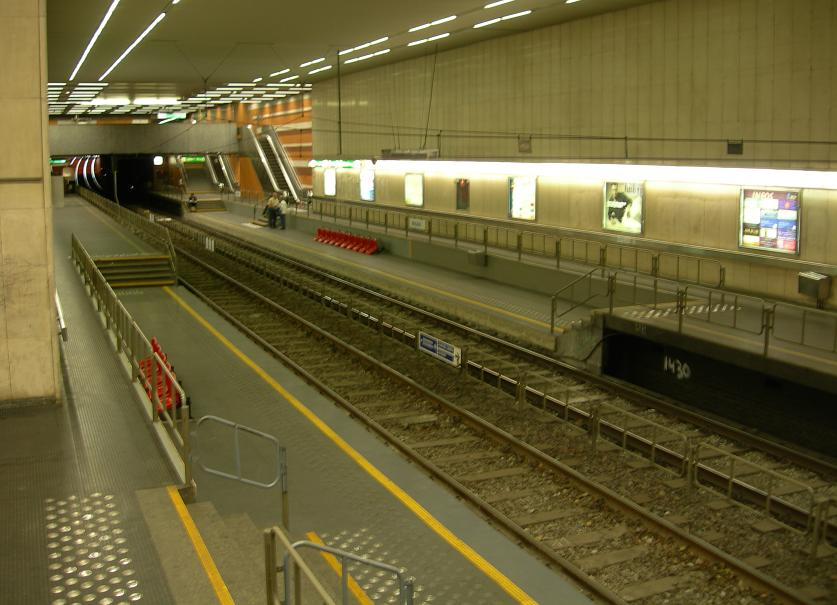
Platforms of Boileau premetro station, showing the dual platform heights

Some stops in the pre-metro network in Brussels feature high platforms with cutouts along the edge. This allows passengers to board low-floor trams while maintaining the potential for future upgrade to full-scale metro operations. The cutouts act as access points for low-floor vehicles, ensuring the station can easily transition to a fully high-platform configuration when necessary.

The Muni Metro system in San Francisco utilizes high-floor light rail vehicles (LRVs). To ensure accessibility for wheelchair users, many street-level stations feature ramps for level boarding. Non-wheelchair users, however, access the LRV by climbing the interior steps from the street-level platform.

=== Tram stops with triangular platforms ===
Triangular tram stops, where three tracks form a single triangular platform in the middle, are possible due to the shorter length of trams compared to heavy rail trains which does not require an excessively large area. Notable examples of triangular tram stops include platforms 1, 4, and 5 at Siu Hong stop on the Hong Kong Light Rail, and tracks A1, B1, and C1 at Königsplatz on the Augsburg Tram system.

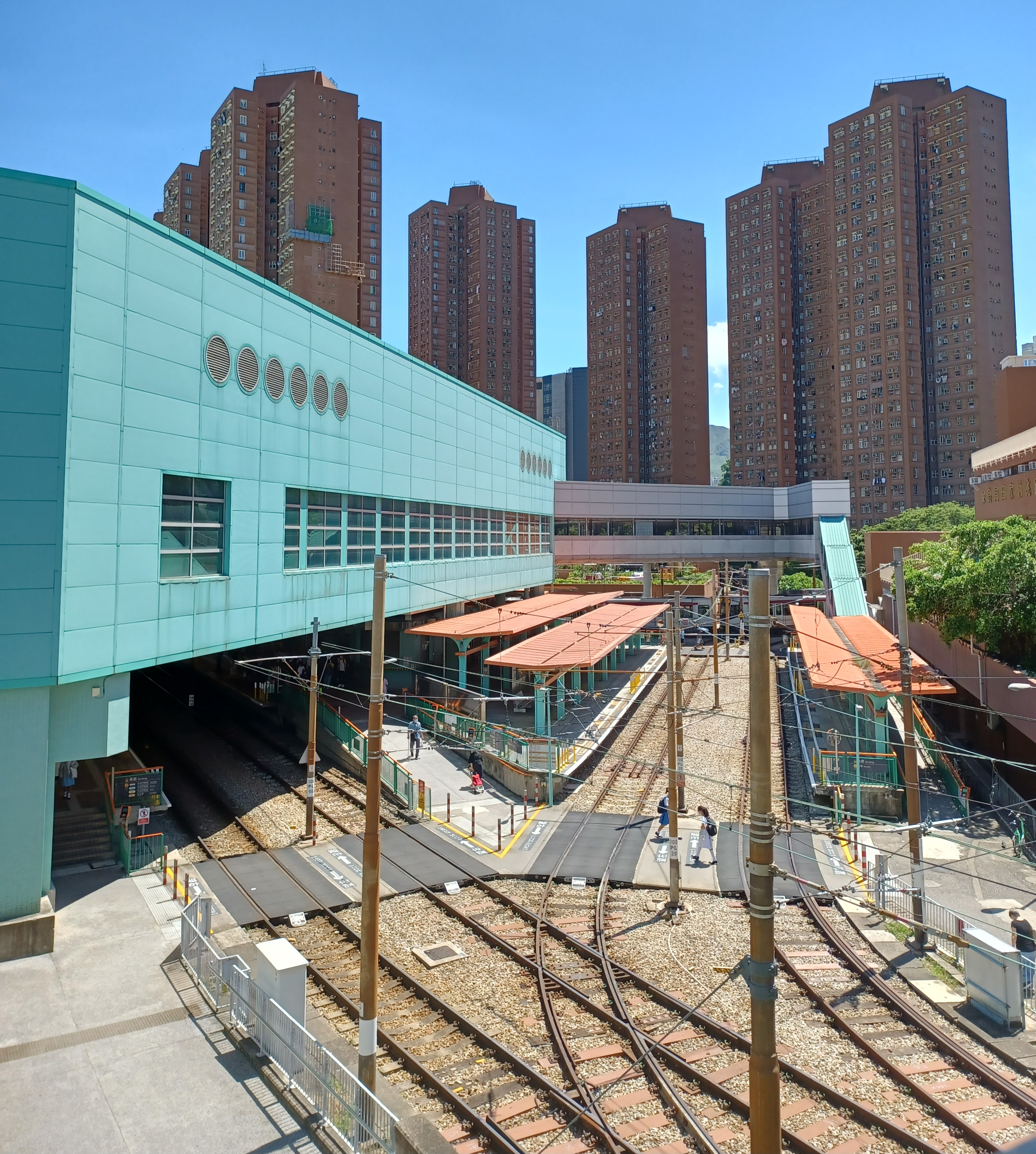
Siu Hong Stop of Hong Kong Light Rail, showing the triangular platform in the middle

Such configuration allows cross-platform interchange across three lines as opposed to two on traditional island platforms, increasing the likelihood of convenient cross-platform transfers.

However, triangular tram stop layout necessitates three flat junctions immediately at each end of the platform, introducing additional operational complexities and the potential for delays, particularly during periods of heavy tram traffic, as a tram heading in one direction may have to wait for trains heading in another direction to clear the junction before it can cross. In addition, to reach the platforms, trams must make sharp turns, typically by about 30 degrees, which poses issues such as slow speeds and noise.

=== Sunday tram stops ===
Not all tram stops are served full-time. In the 1920s, Toronto created Sunday stops in addition to regular stops along its streetcar routes. Sunday stops were only used on a Sunday and, with few exceptions, were always near a Christian church. There were also a few Sunday stops near subway stations that were usable only before 9 am, the Sunday opening time of the subway system. However, the Toronto Transit Commission decided to close all Sunday stops on June 7, 2015. The TTC found that Sunday stops slow down streetcars making it more difficult to maintain schedules. Also, Sunday stops were also unfair to non-Christian places of worship which never had the equivalent of a Sunday stop. By 2015, most Sunday stops were along current and former streetcar routes.

=== Tram stops with platform screen doors ===
The Dubai Tram, which opened on 12 November 2014, became the world's first tram system to feature platform screen doors at its tram stops. Lussail LRT and Tel Aviv Light Rail both have platform screen doors at underground stops.

== See also ==
- Bus stop
- Street running
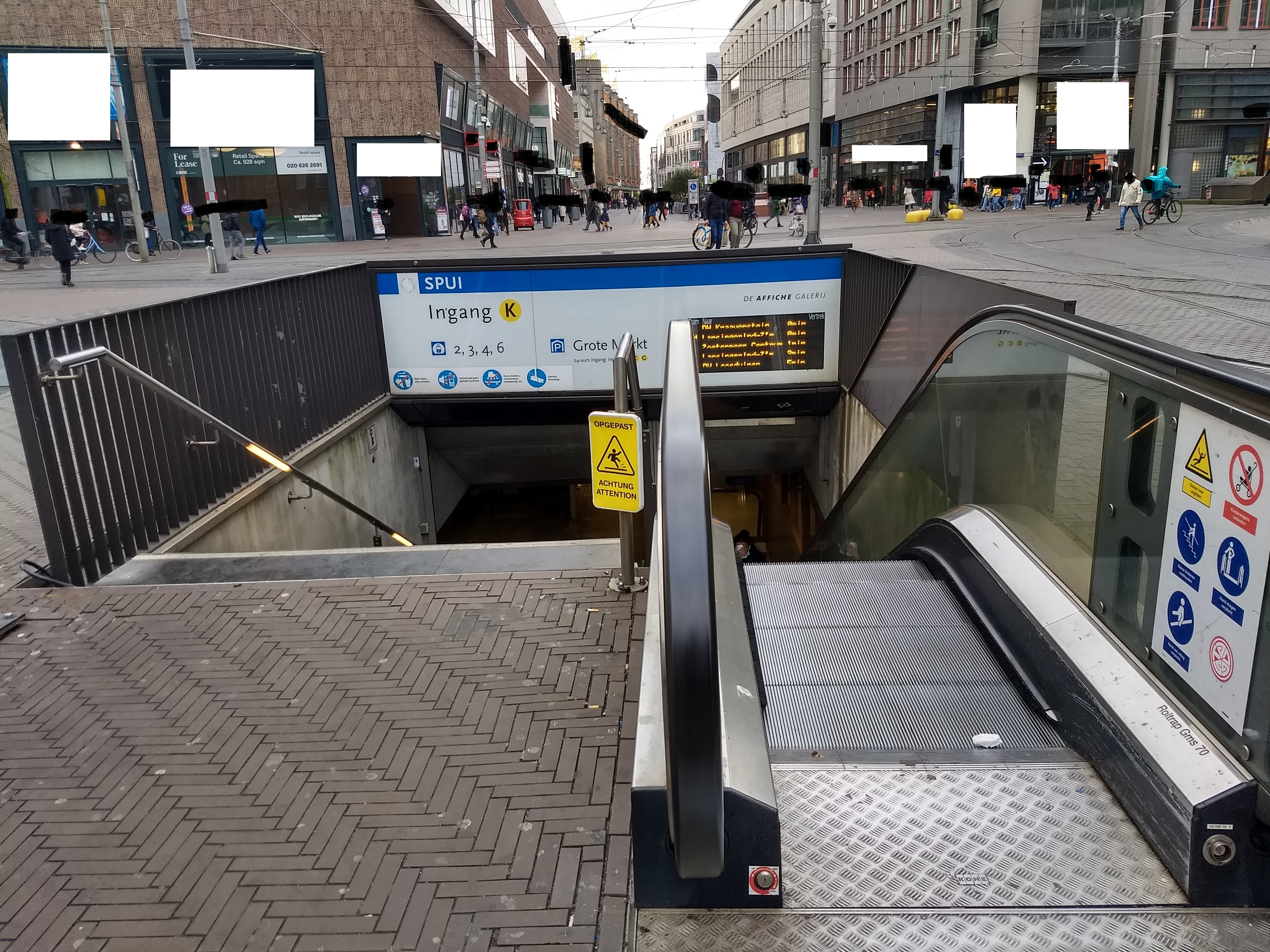
- Just like bus and conventional train stations, street car stations can be located underground, such as in this shopping district in The Hague.
  Train/railway station
